= Justine (given name) =

- Pronunciation: /dʒʌˈstiːn, ˈdʒʌstiːn/ just-EEN, JUST-een

Origin
- Language: Latin
- Meaning: fair, just

Other names
- See also: Justin, Justina

Justine is a given name. It is the feminine form of Justin, derived from Justus, a Latin name meaning just or fair.

It may refer to:

- Justine of Padua (died 304), Christian martyr and saint
- Justine Augier (born 1978), French writer
- Justine Ayebazibwe (born 1972), Ugandan politician
- Justine Baltazar (born 1997), Filipino basketball player
- Justine Bateman (born 1966), American actress, director and writer
- Justine Bayigga (born 1979), Ugandan sprinter
- Justine Benin (born 1975), French employment counselor and politician
- Justine Bitagoye, Burundian journalist
- Justine Blainey-Broker (born 1973), Canadian ice hockey player
- Justine Bouchard (born 1986), Canadian freestyle wrestler
- Justine Braisaz-Bouchet (born 1996), French biathlete
- Justine Brasseur (born 2001), Canadian figure skater
- Justine Caines (1973–2022), Australian advocate and lobbyist
- Justine Caldwell, American politician
- Justine Carroll, Australian rower
- Justine Cassell (born 1960), American professor
- Justine A. Chambers, Canadian choreographer and dancer
- Justine Clarke (born 1971), Australian actress, singer and television presenter
- Justine Comeau (born 1998), Canadian curler
- Justine Cuadra (born 1998), Ecuadorian soccer player
- Justine Davis, Australian politician
- Justine Dorog (born 1998), Filipino volleyball player
- Justine Dufour-Lapointe (born 1994), Canadian freestyle skier
- Justine Dupont (born 1991), French surfer
- Justine Elliot (born 1967), Australian police officer and politician
- Justine Ettler (born 1965), Australian author
- Justine Evans (born 1966), English wildlife filmmaker
- Justine Ezarik (born 1984), American YouTube personality
- Justine Favart (1727–1772), French opera singer, actress, dancer and playwright
- Justine Fedronic (born 1991), French middle-distance runner
- Justine Frischmann (born 1969), English artist and musician
- Justine Fryer (born 1972), New Zealand cricketer
- Justine Greening (born 1969), English politician
- Justine Gruet (born 1989), French politician
- Justine Hardy (born 1966), English author and journalist
- Justine Hastings, American academic and economist
- Justine Henin (born 1982), Belgian tennis player
- Justine Hodder (born 1972), Australian tennis player
- Justine Johnston (1921–2006), American actress
- Justine Johnstone (1895–1982), American actress and pathologist
- Justine Joyce (born 1974), Australian rower
- Justine Keay (born 1975), Australian politician
- Justine Kerfoot (1906–2001), American writer
- Justine Khainza (born 1982), Ugandan politician and social worker
- Justine Kielland (born 2002), Norwegian footballer
- Justine Kish (born 1988), Russian–American mixed martial artist
- Justine Kurland (born 1969), American photographer
- Justine Larbalestier (born 1967), Australian writer
- Justine Lavea (born 1984), New Zealand rugby player
- Justine Lavit (born 2006), French rhythmic gymnast
- Justine Lerond (born 2000), French soccer player
- Justine Lévy (born 1974), French author and book editor
- Justine Lindsay (born 1992), American cheerleader and dancer
- Justine Lorton (born 1974), English soccer player
- Justine Lucas (born 1990), English rugby player
- Justine McCarthy, Irish writer
- Justine McEleney (born 1994), English beauty queen
- Justine McIntyre, Canadian politician
- Justine Moore (born c. 1992), English wheelchair fencer
- Justine Mules (born 1994), Australian rules footballer
- Justine Musk (born 1972), Canadian author
- Justine Nahimana (born 1979), Burundian long-distance runner
- Justine O'Brien, Australian zoologist
- Justine Otto (born 1974), German painter
- Justine Ozga (born 1988), German tennis player
- Justine Palframan (born 1993), South African sprinter
- Justine Paris (1705–1774), French courtesan and madam
- Justine Pasek (born 1979), Ukrainian-born Polish–Panamanian beauty queen, model and philanthropist
- Justine Pelletier (born 2001), Canadian rugby player
- Justine Pelmelay (born 1958), Dutch singer
- Justine Pimlott, Canadian documentarian
- Justine Pissott (born 2004), American basketball player
- Justine W. Polier (1903–1987), American judge
- Justine Priestley (born 1968), Canadian actress
- Justine Rasir (born 2001), Belgian field hockey player
- Justine Robbeson (born 1985), South African javelin thrower
- Justine Roberts (born 1967), English businesswoman
- Justine Rodrigues (born 1993), Canadian-born Guyanese soccer player
- Justine Russell (born 1974), New Zealand cricketer
- Justine Cathrine Rosenkrantz (1659–1746), Danish spy
- Justine Saunders (1953–2007), Australian actress
- Justine Schofield (born 1985), Australian chef and television presenter
- Justine Shapiro (born 1963), South African-born American actress, director, producer and writer
- Justine Shaw, Australian Antarctic researcher and conservationist
- Justine Siegal (born 1975), American baseball coach and sports educator
- Justine Siegemund (1636–1705), German midwife
- Justine Skye (born 1995), American model, singer and songwriter
- Justine Smethurst (born 1987), Australian softball player
- Justine Smyth, New Zealand professional director
- Justine Sowry (born 1970), Australian field hockey player
- Justine Stafford, Irish comedian, writer and television presenter
- Justine Suissa (born 1970), English singer and songwriter
- Justine Thornton (born 1970), English barrister and judge
- Justine Triet (born 1974), French director and writer
- Justine Tsiranana (c. 1918–1999), Malagasy public figure who served as the first First Lady of Madagascar
- Justine Tunney (born 1984), American activist and software developer
- Justine Vanhaevermaet (born 1992), Belgian soccer player
- Justine Verdier (born 1985), French pianist
- Justine Waddell (born 1976), South African actress
- Justine Wadsack, American politician
- Justine Ward (1879–1975), American musical educator
- Justine Wong-Orantes (born 1995), American volleyball player
- Justine Wright, New Zealand film editor
- Justine Zulu (born 1989), Zambian soccer player

Fictional characters

- Justine Last, Jennifer Aniston's character in The Good Girl
- Justine Refuerzo, a character from Abot-Kamay na Pangarap

== See also ==
- Justine (disambiguation)
