= Justino =

Justino is a name which is used as both a given name and a surname. And can come from Italian, Portuguese, or Spanish origin. Notable people with the name include:

== Given name ==
- Justino de Azcárate (1903–1989), Spanish lawyer and politician
- Justino Díaz (born 1940), Puerto Rican operatic bass-baritone
- Justino Orona Madrigal, Saint of the Cristero War
- Justino Romea, Filipino composer, writer, director, musical arranger, poet and journalist

== Middle name ==
- Vinicius Justino Calamari (born 1988), Brazilian footballer
- João Justino Amaral dos Santos (born 1954), former football (soccer) player
- Valcemar Justino da Silva (born 1968), Brazilian professional racing cyclist

== Surname ==
- Fabio Augusto Justino (born 1974), former Brazilian football player
- Hélio Justino (born 1972), Brazilian handball player
- Jorge Luiz Alves Justino (born 1982), Brazilian central defender

== See also ==
- Major Justino Mariño Cuesto Air Base (ICAO: SKMA), Colombian military base in Madrid, Cundinamarca, Colombia
- Justin (disambiguation)
- Justina (disambiguation)
- Justine (disambiguation)
- Justinus (disambiguation)
