= Khusrau Firuz =

Khusrau Firuz was a Justanid king who ruled briefly in 919. He was the brother and successor of Ali of Dailam. Before becoming the ruler of the Justanids, Khusrau Firuz aided his brother Ali in murdering their brother Justan III. Ali then crowned himself as the new ruler of the Justanids, but was shortly killed by the Sallarid ruler Muhammad bin Musafir, who was Justan's son-in-law. Khusrau Firuz then succeeded him as the ruler of the Justanids, but was also killed by Muhammad bin Musafir. Khusrau Firuz was then succeeded by his son Siyahchashm.

== Sources ==
- Madelung, W. (1975). "The Minor Dynasties of Northern Iran". In Frye, R. N. (ed.). The Cambridge History of Iran, Volume 4: From the Arab Invasion to the Saljuqs. Cambridge: Cambridge University Press. pp. 198–249. ISBN 978-0-521-20093-6.

Preceded by Ali of Dailam	Justanid king 919	Succeeded by Siyahchashm
