= Justan =

Justan may refer to:

- Justan I ibn Marzuban I, the Sallarid ruler of Azerbaijan
- Justan III, the sixth king of the Justanid dynasty
- Justann Crawford (born 1973), retired indigenous Australian Olympic boxer
- Kurkir ibn Justan, a Daylamite military officer of the Buyids
- Takyeh-ye Justan, a village in Bala Taleqan Rural District

== See also ==
- Justen (disambiguation)
- Justin (disambiguation)
- Juston (disambiguation)
- Justyn (disambiguation)
