= Hasan al-Utrush =

9th-century ruler in present-day Iran

- Zaydi Imam
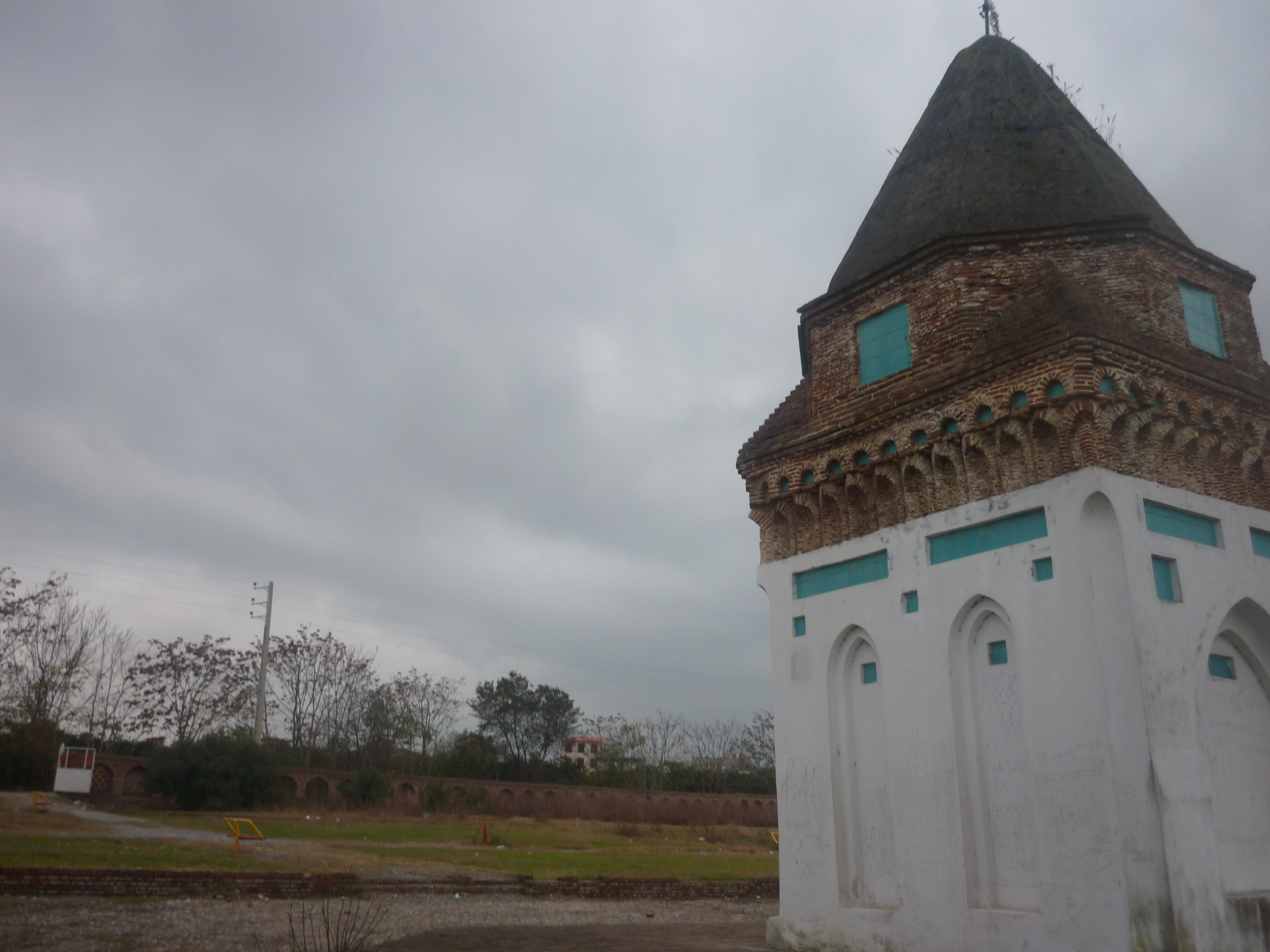
- Tomb of Hasan al-Utrush in Amol

Emir of Tabaristan
- Reign: January 914 – January/February 917
- Predecessor: Samanid occupation
- Successor: Hasan ibn Qasim
- Born: c. 844; Medina
- Died: January/February 917; Amol
- House: Zaydid dynasty
- Religion: Zaydi Shi'a Islam

Abū Muḥammad al-Ḥasan ibn ʿAlī ibn al-Ḥasan ibn ʿAlī ibn ʿUmar al-Ashraf ibn ʿAlī Zayn al-ʿĀbidīn ibn al-Ḥusayn (Medina, c. 844 – Amul, January/February 917), better known as al-Ḥasan al-Uṭrūsh (Arabic: الحسن الأطروش, lit. 'Hasan the Deaf'), was an Alid missionary of the Zaydi Shia sect who re-established Zaydi rule over the province of Tabaristan in northern Iran in 914, after fourteen years of Samanid rule. He ruled Tabaristan until his death under the regnal name of al-Nāṣir liʾl-Ḥaqq ("Defender of the True Faith"), and became known as al-Nāṣir al-Kabīr ("al-Nasir the Elder") to distinguish him from his descendants who bore the same surname. His grandfather Al-Ḥasan is the grandson of ʿAlī Zayn al-ʿĀbidīn'son ʿUmar al-Ashraf. He is still known and recognized as an imam among the Zaydis of Yemen.

== Early life ==
Hasan was born in Medina around 844. Hasan's father was a descendant of Husayn ibn Ali, the grandson of Muhammad and third Shi'a Imam, via his eldest son Ali ibn Husayn Zayn al-Abidin, while his mother was an unnamed Khurasani slave. When Hasan ibn Zayd, a descendant of Husayn's brother Hasan, established his rule over Tabaristan in the 860s, Hasan joined him there. However, he eventually fell out with Hasan ibn Zayd's brother and successor, Muhammad ibn Zayd, who distrusted him. Hasan left Tabaristan and tried to set up a realm of his own in the provinces further east. To this end, he allied himself with the ruler of Khurasan, Muhammad ibn Abdallah al-Khujistani, who was an enemy of Muhammad ibn Zayd. Soon, however, al-Khujistani too came to distrust him and had him imprisoned and scourged, as a result of which he lost his hearing and received the sobriquet al-Utrush ("the Deaf"), by which he is known.

When he was released from imprisonment, Hasan returned to Tabaristan and the service of Muhammad ibn Zayd. Hasan was present and fought alongside the latter in the disastrous battle in 900 at Gurgan against the Samanid army of Muhammad ibn Harun al-Sarakhsi. Muhammad ibn Zayd was defeated and died of his wounds, leaving Tabaristan open to Samanid occupation. Hasan managed to escape the defeat and at first sought refuge in Rayy. There he received the invitation of the Justanid king of Daylam, who had also supported and served the Zaydid brothers. Together, Hasan and the Justanids tried in 902 and 903 to recover control of Tabaristan, but without success. Worried by the fickleness of the Justanids, Hasan resolved to build a power base of his own. He therefore engaged in a mission to the as yet unconverted Gilites and the Daylamites to the north of the Alburz mountains, where he preached in person and founded mosques. His efforts were swiftly crowned by success: the mountain Daylamites and the Gilites east of the Safid Rud river recognized him as their imam with the name of al-Nāṣir liʾl-Ḥaqq ("Defender of the True Faith") and were converted to his own branch of Zaydi Islam, which was named after him as the Nasiriyya and differed in some practices from the "mainstream" Qasimiyya branch adopted in Tabaristan following the teachings of Qasim ibn Ibrahim. This development threatened the position of the Justanid king, Justan ibn Vahsudan, but in the ensuing showdown between the two Hasan was able to affirm his position and compel the Justanid to swear allegiance to himself.

== Recovery of Tabaristan and aftermath ==
Seeing Hasan's rise to power, the Samanid ruler Ahmad ibn Isma'il sent an army under Muhammad ibn Sa'luk to Tabaristan to oppose a new Zaydid takeover of the province. Although the Samanid force was far superior in numbers and equipment, Hasan managed to inflict a crushing defeat upon it in December 913 at Burdidah on the river Burrud west of Chalus. A detachment that managed to find refuge in the fortress of Chalus was induced to surrender and then massacred by his son-in-law, Abu Muhammad al-Hasan ibn al-Qasim. After this success, the provincial capital Amul opened its gates to the Zaydid forces, and Hasan took up residence in the palace. Taking advantage of the murder of Ahmad ibn Ismai'il soon after, and the preoccupation of his successor Nasr II with cementing his own authority, Hasan was soon able to extend his control over all the old Zaydid domains, including both Tabaristan and Gurgan. A Samanid counter-attack temporarily forced him to abandon Amul and withdraw to Chalus, but after 40 days he beat the invasion back and re-established his position. Even old opponents of the first Zaydid emirs, like the Bavandid Sharwin II, made peace with him and accepted his authority.

His achievement was undermined, however, by tensions among his supporters over the issue of his succession, given his advanced age. Hasan's own sons were regarded as dissolute and incapable for leadership, while Hasan fell out with his son-in-law and chief general, Abu Muhammad al-Hasan ibn al-Qasim. On one occasion the latter even took the elderly imam captive, but this produced such an outcry that he was forced to flee to Daylam. In the end, the notables of Tabaristan prevailed upon both to mend their differences, and Abu Muhammad was named as successor over Hasan's own sons. Hasan ruled over Tabaristan until his death in January/February 917, and even a Sunni historian like al-Tabari comments that "the people had not seen anything like the justice of al-Utrush, his good conduct, and his fulfilment of the right". His tomb in Amul became a major site of pilgrimage for the Daylamite and Gilite Shi'ites, and his descendants, who kept the honorific surname al-Nasir, were held in high esteem.

Upon his death, Abu Muhammad returned from Gilan and succeeded him as ruler until his death in 928. Although a popular ruler, his reign was constantly threatened by Hasan's sons Abu'l-Husayn Ahmad and Abu'l-Qaim Ja'far and their supporters, who deposed and forced him to exile briefly in 919 and again in 923–926.

== Sources ==
- Strothmann, R. (1971). "Ḥasan al-Uṭrūs̲h̲". In Lewis, B.; Ménage, V. L.; Pellat, Ch. & Schacht, J. (eds.). The Encyclopaedia of Islam, Second Edition. Volume III: H–Iram. Leiden: E. J. Brill. pp. 254–255. doi:10.1163/1573-3912_islam_SIM_2777. OCLC 495469525.
- Madelung, W. (1975). "The Minor Dynasties of Northern Iran". In Frye, R.N. (ed.). The Cambridge History of Iran, Volume 4: From the Arab Invasion to the Saljuqs. Cambridge: Cambridge University Press. pp. 198–249. ISBN 978-0-521-20093-6.
