= Siyahchashm =

Siyahchashm (Persian: سیاه‌چشم, romanized: siyāhčašm, lit. 'black eye'), also known by his laqab of Mahdi, was ruler of the Justanids from 919 to 928. He was the son and successor of Khusrau Firuz.

Siyahchashm's father Khusrau Firuz was killed in 919 by the Sallarid ruler Muhammad bin Musafir, who made the Justanids his vassal. Siyahchashm then succeeded Khusrau Firuz as the new ruler of the Justanids. Siyahchashm was killed in 928 by a Dailamite military commander named Asfar ibn Shiruya. He was succeeded by Justan IV.

== Sources ==
- Madelung, W. (1975). "The Minor Dynasties of Northern Iran". In Frye, R. N. (ed.). The Cambridge History of Iran, Volume 4: From the Arab Invasion to the Saljuqs. Cambridge: Cambridge University Press. pp. 198–249. ISBN 978-0-521-20093-6.

Preceded by Khusrau Firuz	Justanid king 919–928	Succeeded by Justan IV
