= Muhammad ibn Musafir =

Muhammad bin Musafir (Persian: محمد بن مسافر) (died before 953) was the Sallarid ruler of Tarom in modern northwest Iran (before 916–941) and Iranian Azerbaijan (949). He was the son of Musafir, and his original name seems to have been Sallar or Salar (Persian for 'commander'); 'Sallar' would later become a title used by his successors.

== Biography ==
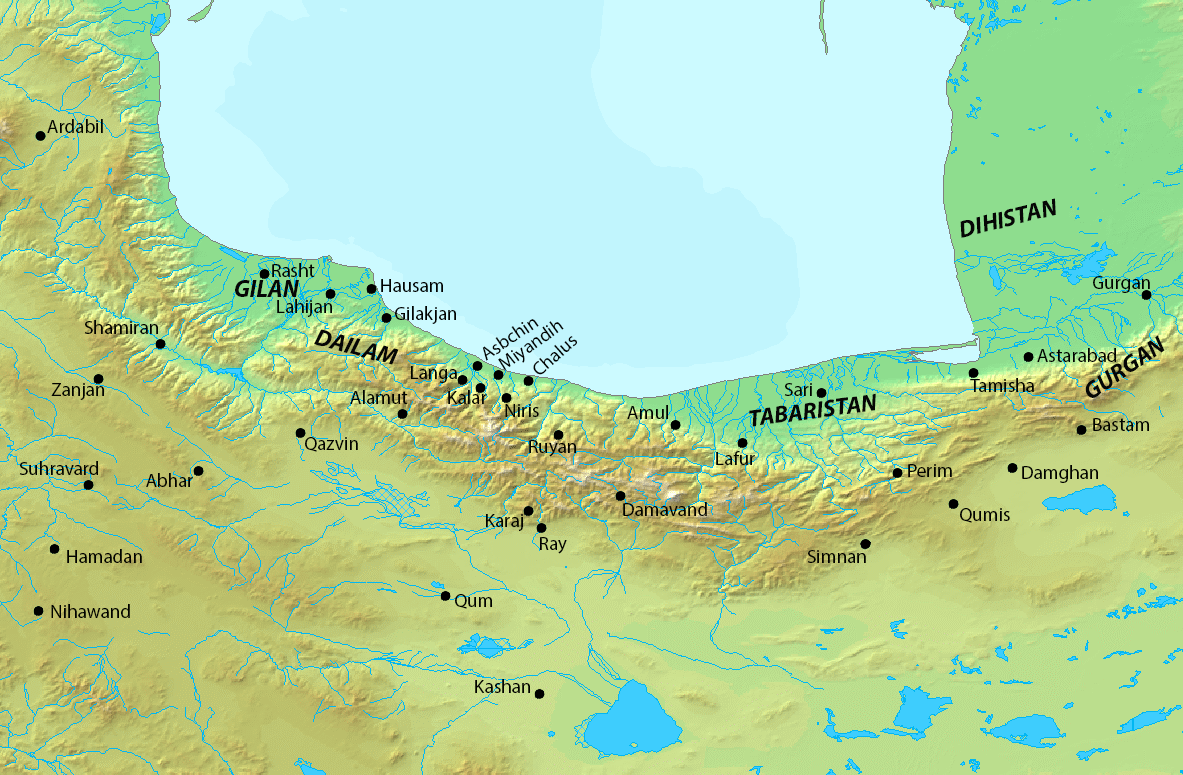
Map of northern Iran

Some time before 916 Muhammad became the ruler of Tarom. Like his predecessors, he forged a marriage alliance with the Justanids of Dailaman by marrying Kharasuya, daughter of the Justanid king Justan III. This marriage allowed him to intervene in the affairs of the Justanids. In 919 he killed Ali of Dailam, who had murdered Justan in order to take the throne for himself. Muhammad also killed Khusrau Firuz in battle, although Khusrau Firuz's son Siyahchashm was able to succeed him in spite of the Sallarid. Despite this, the power of the Sallarids increased at the Justanids' expense.

In 930 the Dailamite Asfar ibn Shiruya ordered Mardavij to seize Tarom from Muhammad. Mardavij invaded Tarom and laid siege to the fortress of Shamiran, but Muhammad was eventually able to persuade him to revolt against Asfar. With Sallarid support Mardavij killed Asfar's brother Shirzad and then Asfar himself, taking the latter's territories and founding the Ziyarid dynasty of northern Iran.

Muhammad's oppressive rule made him unpopular even to his own family. In 941 his sons Marzuban and Wahsudan confined him in a castle. Wahsudan took over the rule in Tarom, while Marzuban went on to conquer Azerbaijan. Muhammad was freed in 949, after Marzuban had been captured by the Buwayhids. Marzuban's Dailamite captains rallied around Muhammad, freeing him and setting him up in Ardebil. He was unable to maintain himself in Azerbaijan for long, however, as he quickly offended the Dailamites and was forced to flee to Tarom. There he was imprisoned for a second time by Wahsudan, and remained in prison until his death, which occurred some time before 953.

Besides his political career, Muhammad was known for building up the fortress of Shamiran. He did so by using expert workmen, promising them high pay but then reducing their status to that of forced laborers.

== Sources ==
- Madelung, W. (1975). "The Minor Dynasties of Northern Iran". In Frye, R.N. (ed.). The Cambridge History of Iran, Volume 4: From the Arab Invasion to the Saljuqs. Cambridge: Cambridge University Press. pp. 198–249. ISBN 978-0-521-20093-6.
- Bosworth, C. E. (1968). "The Political and Dynastic History of the Iranian World (A.D. 1000–1217)". In Frye, R. N. (ed.). The Cambridge History of Iran, Volume 5: The Saljuq and Mongol periods. Cambridge: Cambridge University Press. pp. 1–202. ISBN 0-521-06936-X.
- Bosworth, Clifford Edmund. The New Islamic Dynasties: A Chronological and Genealogical Manual. Great Britain: Columbia University Press, 1996. ISBN 0-231-10714-5

Preceded by	Sallarid ruler of Azerbaijan; 919–941	Succeeded by Marzuban
Preceded by	Sallarid ruler of Dailam; 919–941	Succeeded by Wahsudan
Preceded by	Sallarid ruler of Azerbaijan; 949–953	Succeeded by Marzuban
