= Justin =

Justin may refer to:

== People and fictional characters ==
- Justin (given name), including a list of people and fictional characters with the given name
- Justin (historian), Latin historian who lived under the Roman Empire
- Justin I (c. 450–527), Eastern Roman Emperor who ruled from 518 to 527
- Justin II (c. 520–578), Eastern Roman emperor who ruled from 565 to 578
- Justin (magister militum per Illyricum) (fl. 538–552), Byzantine general
- Justin (Moesia) (died 528), Byzantine general killed in battle
- Justin (consul 540) (c. 525–566), Byzantine general
- Justin Martyr (103–165), Christian martyr
- Justin (gnostic), 2nd-century Gnostic Christian; sometimes confused with Justin Martyr
- Justin the Confessor (died 269)
- Justin of Chieti, venerated as an early bishop of Chieti, Italy
- Justin of Siponto (c. 4th century), venerated as a martyr by the Catholic Church
- Justin de Jacobis (1800–1860), Italian Lazarist missionary who became Vicar Apostolic of Abyssinia and titular Bishop of Nilopolis
- Justin (singer, born 2002), stage name of Chinese singer Huang Minghao, member of NEXT
- Sid Justin (born 1954), American footballer, singer and songwriter

== Music ==
- Justin (Justin Lo album), 2005
- "Justin", a song by Korn from the 1998 album Follow the Leader
- "Justin", a song by Vince Staples from the 2024 album Dark Times

== Other uses ==
- Justin, Texas, a city in the United States
- Justin.tv, a network of diverse channels providing a platform for lifecasting and live video streaming of events online
- Justin (robot), a humanoid robot developed by the German Aerospace Center

== See also ==
- Saint Justin (disambiguation)
- Iustin Moisescu (1910–1986), Patriarch of All Romania
- Justine (disambiguation)
- Justinian
- Justinus (disambiguation)
- Justan (disambiguation)
- Justen (disambiguation)
- Juston (disambiguation)
- Justyn (disambiguation)
