= Justina =

- Gender: Female

Origin
- Origin: Latin
- Derivation: Iustus
- Meaning: fair, just

Other names
- See also: Justin, Justine

Justina is an anglicised version of the Latin name Iustina, feminine of Iustinus, a derivative of Iustus, meaning fair or just. For the masculine version of the name, see Justin.

== Translations ==
- Russian: Устинья, Юстина, Иустина
- Belarusian: Юстына, Юсціна
- Czech: Justina or Justýna
- Croatian: Justina, Justa, Juste
- Slovak: Justína
- Romanian: Iustina
- Hungarian: Jusztina
- Finnish: Justiina
- Greek: Ιουστίνη (Ioustine)
- Indonesian: Justina, Yustina
- Lithuanian: Justina, Justė
- Polish: Justyna
- Ukrainian: Юстина, Устина
- Italian: Giustina
- French: Justine
- Portuguese: Justina
- Spanish: Justina
- Swedish: Justina
- Arabic: يوستينا (Youstina)
- Albanian: Gjystina

== People named Justina ==
=== Ancient and medieval eras ===
- Saint Justina of Cagliari (died 130), Christian martyr - see Justa, Justina and Henedina
- Justina, (born c. 225-227), daughter of Severus Alexander and Talmudic figure
- Saint Justina of Padua (died c. 304), Christian martyr
- Saint Justina of Antioch (died 304), Christian martyr - see Cyprian and Justina
- Justina (empress) (c. 340–c. 388), second wife of Roman Emperor Valentinian I and mother of Emperor Valentinian II
- Justina Szilágyi (1455–1497), Hungarian noblewoman, second wife of Vlad the Impaler, Voivode of Wallachia and inspiration for Dracula

=== Modern era ===
- Justina Agatahi (born 1989), Nigerian judoka
- Justina Akpulo (born 1972), Nigerian handball player
- Justina Anyiam (born 1972), Nigerian handball player
- Justina Banda (born 1992), Zambian footballer
- Justina Blakeney (born 1979), American designer and author
- Justina Bricka (born 1943), American former tennis player
- Justina Casagli (1794–1841), Swedish opera singer
- Justina Charles, Dominican politician
- Justina Chen (born 1968), Taiwanese-American fiction writer and executive communications consultant
- Justina Chepchirchir (born 1968), Kenyan former middle-distance runner
- Justina David (1912-?), Filipina film actress
- Justina Di Stasio (born 1992), Canadian wrestler of Italian and Cree descent
- Justina Eze, Nigerian diplomat and politician
- Justina Ford (1871–1952), American physician
- Justina Gaspar (?-1986), Mozambican politician
- Justina Gringytė (born 1986), Lithuanian operatic singer
- Justina Huff (1893–1977), American silent film actress
- Justina Ireland, American science-fiction and fantasy author
- Justina Jeffreys (1787–1869), Jamaican-born British gentlewoman
- Justina Jonas, Namibia politician
- Justina Lavrenovaitė-Perez (born 1984), Lithuanian football referee and former player
- Justina Machado (born 1972), American actress
- Justina Mikulskytė (born 1996), Lithuanian tennis player
- Justina Morales (1987–1995), American murder victim
- Justina Morcillo (born 2000), Argentine footballer
- Justina Hermina Pacek (1931–2016), a Slovenian nurse, photographer, painter, and illustrator
- Justina Praça (born 1979), Angolan retired handball player
- Justina Robson (born 1968), English science fiction author
- Justina Sharp (born 1997), American fashion and beauty influencer, blogger, journalist, advice columnist, and social justice advocate
- Justina Szilágyi (1455–1497), Hungarian noblewoman
- Justina Vail Evans (born 1963), British actress, life coach, author, and hypnotherapist
- Justina Valentine (born 1987), American television host, rapper, singer, songwriter, and model
- Justina Wilhelm, American academic administrator, community leader, and social worker
