= Ibrahim I ibn Marzuban I =

10th-century ruler of Dvin and Azerbaijan

King of Dvin
- Reign: 957 - 979
- Predecessor: Marzuban ibn Muhammad
- Successor: Abu'l-Hajja

King of Azerbaijan
- Reign: 962 - 979
- Predecessor: Ismail ibn Wahsudan; Nuh ibn Wahsudan
- Successor: Marzuban II ibn Ismail
- Died: 983; Azerbaijan
- House: Sallarid
- Father: Marzuban ibn Muhammad
- Religion: Islam

Ibrahim I ibn Marzuban I (died 983) was the Sallarid ruler of Dvin (957–979) and later Azerbaijan (962–966 and 966–979). He was the son and successor of Marzuban ibn Muhammad.

== Biography ==
Marzuban ibn Muhammad had designated his brother Wahsudan ibn Muhammad as his successor. When he came to Azerbaijan, however, the commanders of the fortresses refused to surrender to him, recognizing instead Marzuban's son Justan I ibn Marzuban I as his successor. Unable to establish his rule in the province, Wahusdan returned to Tarum; Justan was recognized as ruler in Azerbaijan, with his brother Ibrahim made governor of Dvin. Justan seems to have been interested primarily in his harem, a fact which alienated some of his supporters, although he and Ibrahim successfully put down a revolt by a grandson of the caliph al-Muktafi in 960.

Shortly afterwards Justan and another brother, Nasir, came to Tarum, where they were treacherously imprisoned by Wahsudan, who sent his son Ismail ibn Wahsudan to take over Azerbaijan. Ibrahim raised an army in Armenia to oppose Isma'il, prompting Wahsudan to execute Justan, his mother and Nasir. Ibrahim was driven out of Azerbaijan by Isma'il, but retained his rule in Dvin.

Isma'il died in 962, however, allowing Ibrahim to occupy Azerbaijan. He then invaded Tarum and forced Wahsudan to flee to Dailaman. In 966 Ibrahim was defeated by an army of Wahsudan's and his soldiers subsequently deserted him. He fled to his brother-in-law, the Buyid Rukn al-Dawla, while Wahsudan installed his son Nuh ibn Wahsudan in Azerbaijan. Rukn al-Dawla sent an army under his vizier Abu 'l-Fadl ibn al-'Amid to reinstate Ibrahim in Azerbaijan, and Wahsudan was ejected from Tarum for a time. In 967 however he again sent an army, which burnt Ardabil before Ibrahim concluded a peace with his uncle, ceding part of Azerbaijan to him. In 968 he reaffirmed Sallarid authority over Shirvan, forcing the Shirvanshah to pay him tribute.

Ibrahim's authority began to decline in the latter part of his reign. In 971 the Shaddadids took Ganja, and Ibrahim was forced to recognize their rule in that city after a siege failed to dislodge them. In around 979 he was deposed and imprisoned; he died in 983. His deposition marked the end of the Sallarids as a major power in Azerbaijan, as the Rawadids of Tabriz overran much of the province. The successor of Ibrahim, Marzuban II ibn Ismail, managed to retain a small portion of Azerbaijan until 984 when he was captured by the Rawadids.

== Sources ==
- Madelung, W. (1975). "The Minor Dynasties of Northern Iran". In Frye, R.N. (ed.). The Cambridge History of Iran, Volume 4: From the Arab Invasion to the Saljuqs. Cambridge: Cambridge University Press. pp. 198–249. ISBN 978-0-521-20093-6.
- Bosworth, C. E. (1975). "Iran under the Buyids". In Frye, R. N. (ed.). The Cambridge History of Iran, Volume 4: From the Arab Invasion to the Saljuqs. Cambridge: Cambridge University Press. pp. 250–305. ISBN 0-521-20093-8.

Preceded by Marzuban ibn Muhammad	Sallarid ruler of Azerbaijan; 957–979	Succeeded by Nuh ibn Wahsudan
