= Justen =

Justen is both a surname and a given name. Notable people with the name include:

- Christel Justen (1957–2005), German swimmer
- Iago Justen Maidana Martins, Brazilian footballer
- Marçal Justen Filho (born 1955), Brazilian lawyer and jurist
- Justen Blok, Dutch field hockey player
- Justen Glad (born 1997), American soccer player
- Justen Kranthove, Dutch footballer

== See also ==
- Justan (disambiguation)
- Justin (disambiguation)
- Juston (disambiguation)
- Justyn (disambiguation)
