= Justyna =

Justyna is a Polish feminine given name, a variation of Justina or Justine. It may refer to

- 'Justyna', Gusta Dawidson Draenger (1917–1943), Polish Jewish resistance fighter
- Justyna Banasiak (born 1986), Polish group rhythmic gymnast
- Justyna Bojczuk (born 1995), Polish actress
- Justyna Jegiołka (born 1991), Polish tennis player
- Justyna Kaczkowska (born 1997), Polish professional racing cyclist
- Justyna Kasprzycka (born 1987), Polish high jumper
- Justyna Kozdryk (born 1980), Polish powerlifter
- Justyna Kowalczyk (born 1983), Polish cross country skier
- Justyna Majkowska (born 1977), Polish singer
- Justyna Mospinek (born 1983), Polish archer
- Justyna Plutowska (born 1991), Polish ice dancer
- Justyna Steczkowska (born 1972), Polish singer, songwriter, photographer, and actress
- Justyna Święty (born 1992), Polish sprint runner
- Justyna Wasilewska (born 1985), Polish actress
- Justyna Wydrzyńska, Polish abortion-rights activist
