= Juston =

Juston may refer to:

- Juston Burris (born 1993), an American football safety for the Carolina Panthers of the National Football League
- Juston Seyfert, a fictional character appearing in American comic books published by Marvel Comics
- Juston Wood (born 1979), an American football coach and former quarterback

== See also ==
- Justan (disambiguation)
- Justen (disambiguation)
- Justin (disambiguation)
- Justyn (disambiguation)
