= Iranian Intermezzo =

821-1055 Resurgence of Iranian self-rule after the Arab conquests

- Part of the history of Iran
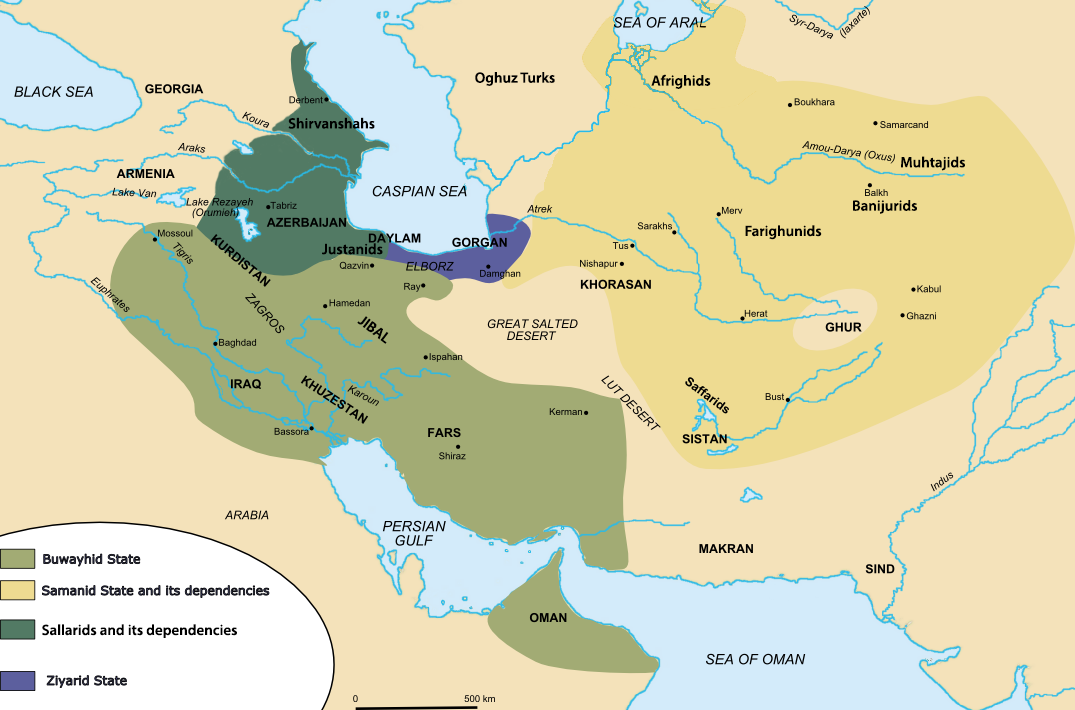
- A map of the Iranian plateau in the 10th century, showing the Buyid state, the Samanid state and its dependencies, the Sallarid state and its dependencies, the Ziyarid state, and others
- Date: 821–1055 (234 years)
- Location: Greater Iran
- Participants: Various Iranian Muslim and Zoroastrian (Note: Ziyarids under Mardavij.) dynasties
- Outcome: End of Arab rule over Iran; Revitalization of the Persian language

The Iranian Intermezzo, also called the Persian Renaissance, was a period in Iranian history marked by the rise to power of the first Iranian Muslim dynasties. Beginning 170 years after the Arab conquest of Iran and lasting until the middle of the 11th century, it is noteworthy since it was an interlude between the decay of Arab power under the Abbasid Caliphate and the rise of Turkic power under the Seljuk Empire, which triggered the Sunni Revival. The Iranian Intermezzo brought an end to Arab hegemony over Iranian lands and revived Iran's national spirit, albeit in conformity with Islam, though there were some non-Muslim movements (e.g., Mardavij) that outright rejected the Islamization of Iran. Although Zoroastrianism continued to decline, the movement did succeed in revitalizing the Persian language, with the most significant Persian literature from this period being the Shahnameh by Ferdowsi. The Iranian dynasties that took part in this effort were the Tahirids, the Saffarids, the Ilyasids, the Ghaznavids, the Sajids, the Samanids, the Ziyarids, the Buyids, the Sallarids, the Rawadids, the Marwanids, the Shaddadids, the Kakuyids, the Annazids, and the Hasanwayhids.

According to the historian Alison Vacca: "The Iranian Intermezzo in fact includes a number of other Iranian, mostly Kurdish, minor dynasties in the former caliphal provinces of Armenia, Albania, and Azerbaijan". Likewise, in the second edition of the Encyclopaedia of Islam, the historian Clifford Edmund Bosworth states that the Russian historian Vladimir Minorsky considers the Rawadids to be flourishing during this period.

== List of Intermezzo dynasties ==
=== Tahirid (821–873) ===
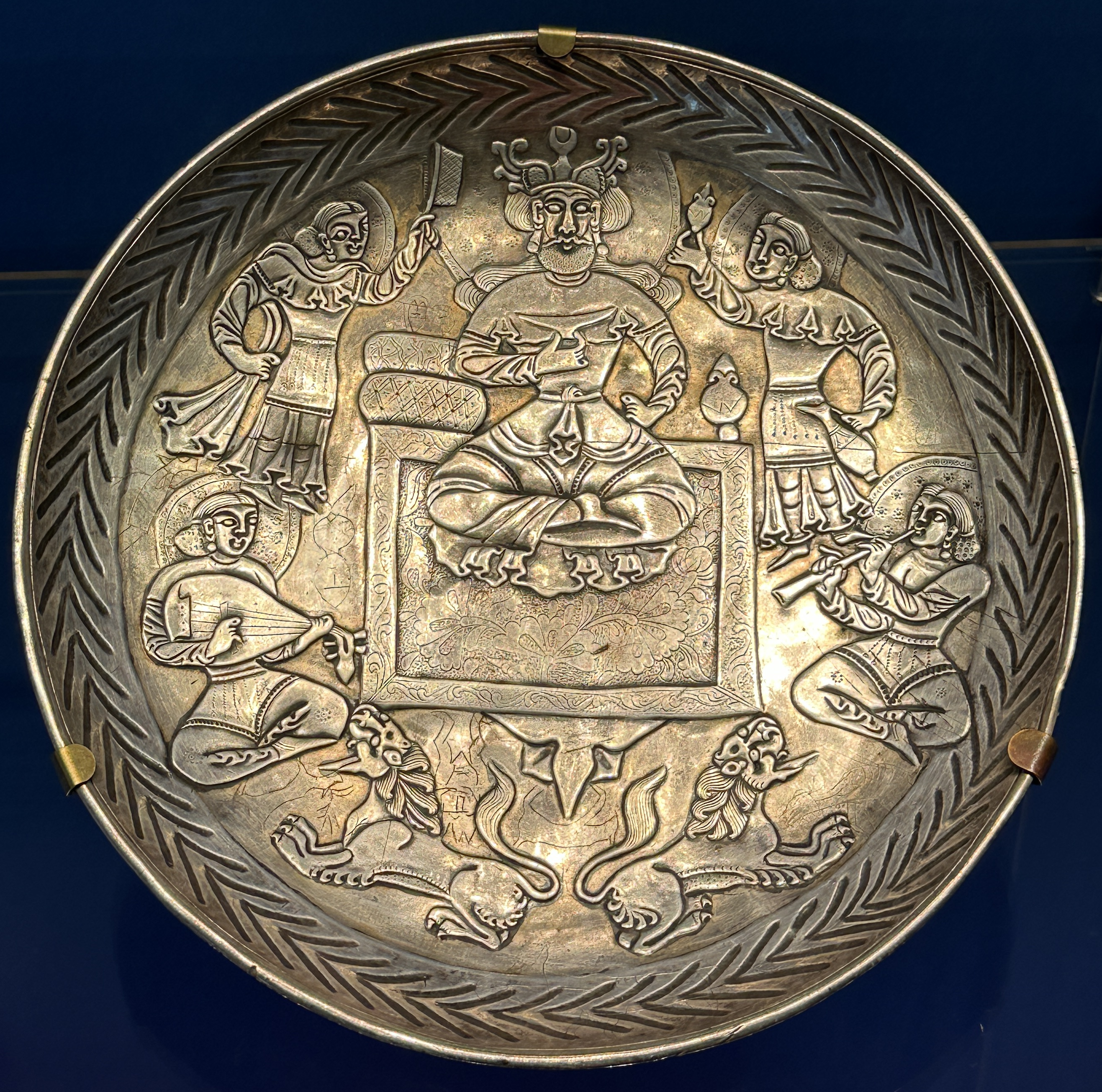
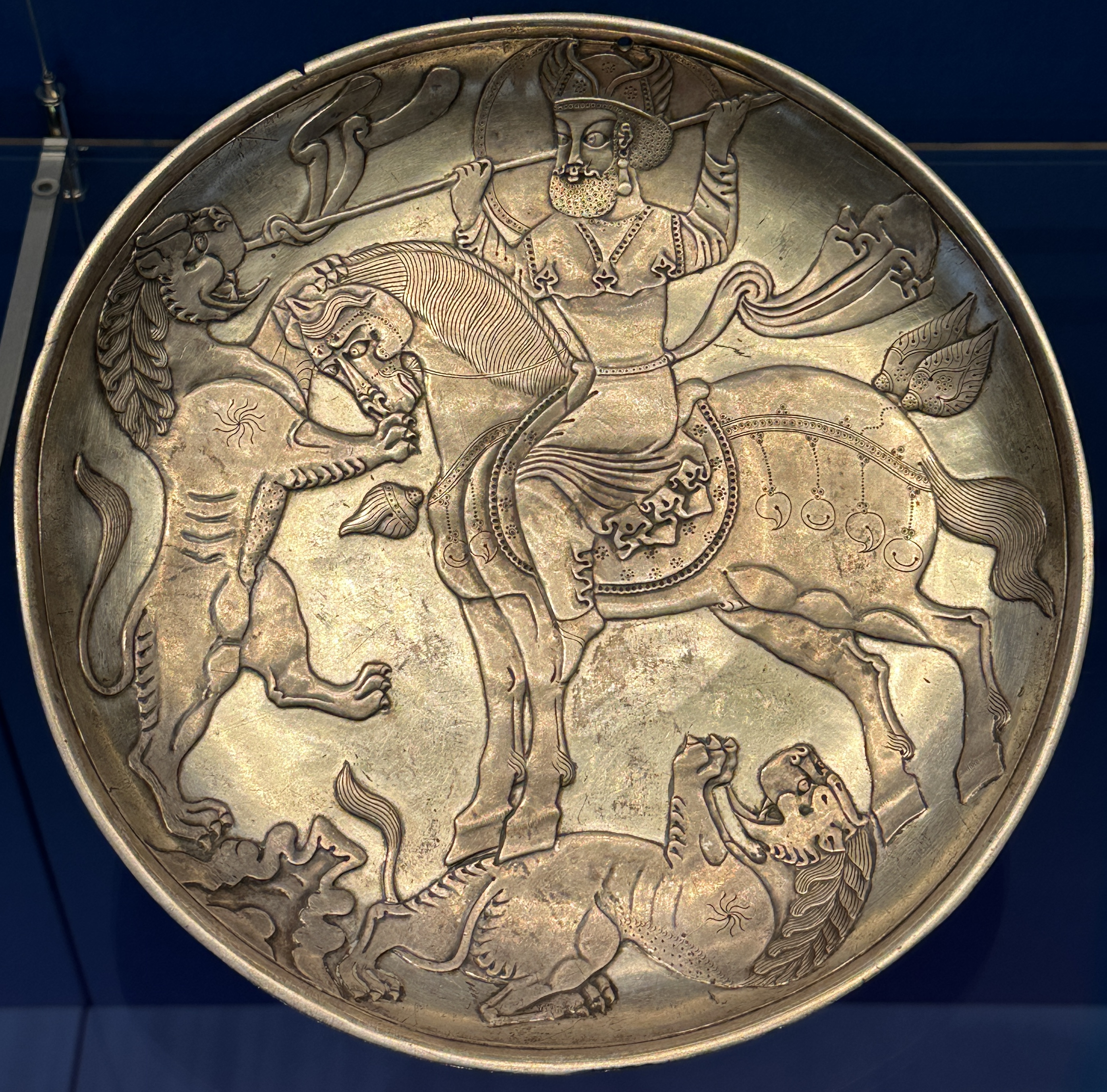
Early 9th-century Sasanian-style silver plates from Merv

The Tahirid dynasty (Persian: سلسله طاهریان) was an Iranian dynasty that ruled over the northeastern part of Greater Iran, in the region of Khorasan (made up of parts of Iran, present-day Afghanistan, Tajikistan, Turkmenistan, and Uzbekistan). The Tahirid capital was located in Nishapur.

=== Saffarid (861–1003) ===
The Saffarid dynasty (Persian: سلسله صفاریان) was an Iranian empire which ruled in Sistan (861–1003), a historical region in southeastern Iran and southwestern Afghanistan. Their capital was Zaranj.

=== Samanid (819/875–999) ===
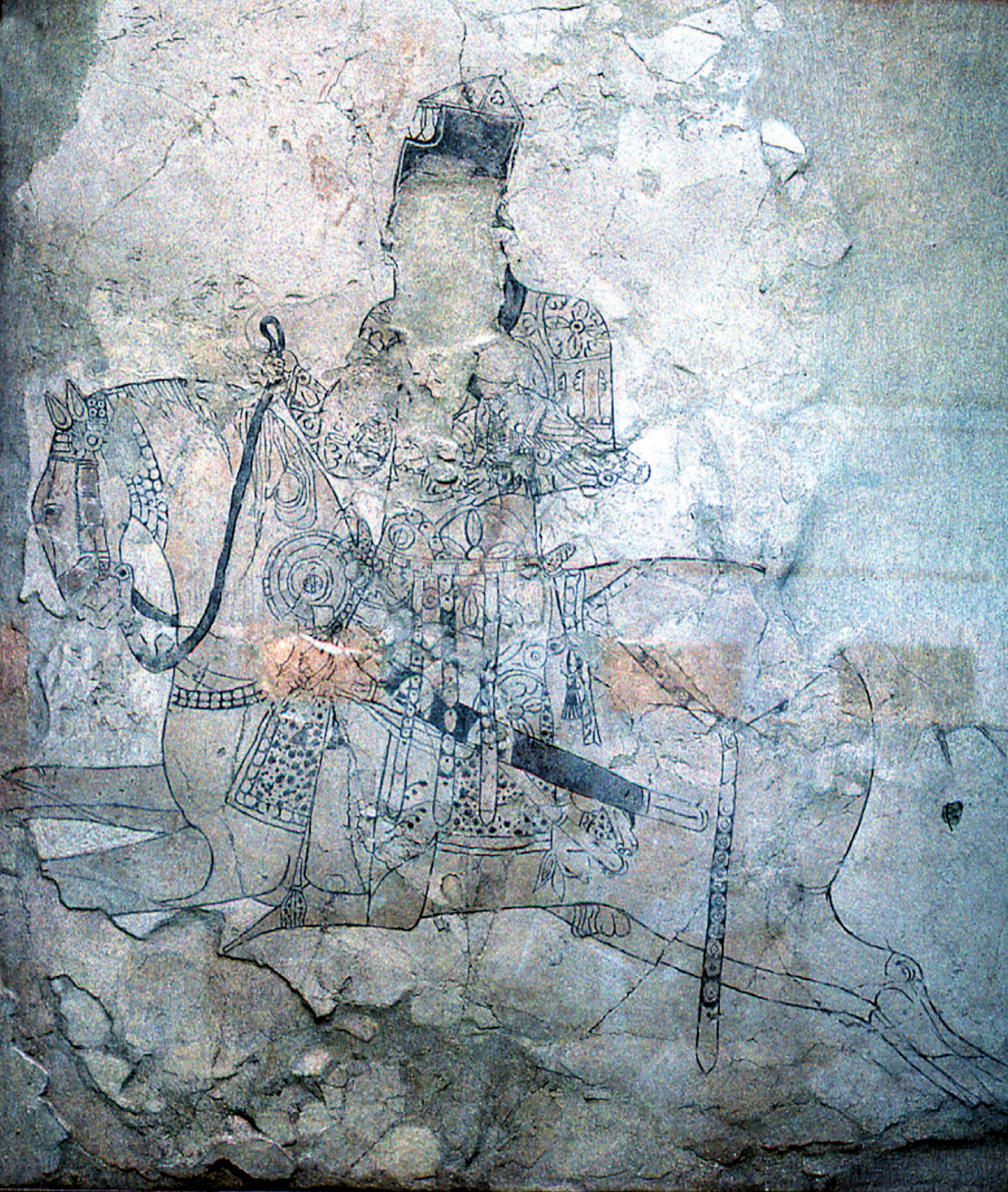
Wall painting of a mounted falconer in decorated caftan from Nīshāpūr area, Sāmānid, 10th-century (Museum of Islamic Archaeology, Tehran, Iran)

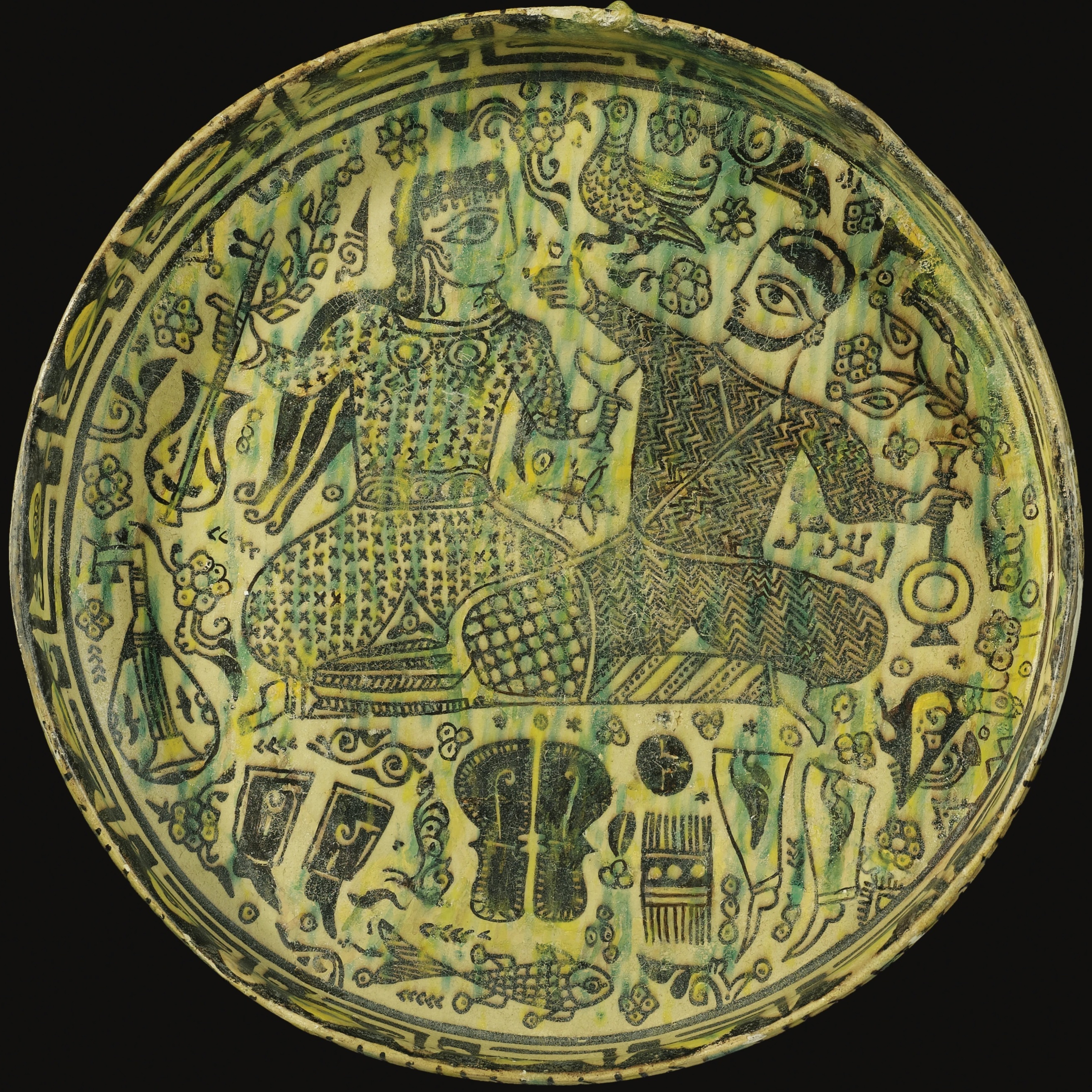
10th-century Samanid earthenware, probably produced in Nishapur, depicting a convivial scene with a couple, accompanied by the Persian inscription nush kon (“Drink!”) and the Arabic inscription laka (“For you”), both in Kufic script.

The Samanid dynasty (Persian: سلسلهٔ سامانیان), also known as the Samanid Empire or simply Samanids (819–999), (Persian: سامانیان Sāmāniyān) were an Iranian empire in Central Asia and Greater Khorasan, named after its founder Saman Khuda who converted to Sunni Islam despite being from Zoroastrian theocratic nobility.

With their roots stemming from the city of Balkh (in present-day Afghanistan), the Samanids promoted the arts, giving rise to the advancement of science and literature, and thus attracted scholars such as Rudaki and Avicenna. While under Samanid control, Bukhara was a rival to Baghdad in its glory. Scholars note that the Samanids revived Persian more than the Buyids and the Saffarids, while continuing to patronize Arabic to a significant degree. Nevertheless, in a famous edict, Samanid authorities declared that "here, in this region, the language is Persian, and the kings of this realm are Persian kings."

=== Sajid (889–929) ===
The Sajid dynasty (Persian: ساجیان) was an Islamic dynasty that ruled from 889–890 until 929. The Sajids ruled Azerbaijan and parts of Armenia first from Maragha and Barda and then from Ardabil. The Sajids originated from the Central Asian province of Ushrusana and were of Iranian (Sogdian) heritage.

=== Ziyarid (930–1090) ===
The Ziyarid dynasty (Persian: زیاریان) was an Iranian dynasty of Gilaki origin that ruled Tabaristan from 930 to 1090. At its greatest extent, it ruled much of western and northern Iran.

=== Banu Ilyas (932–968) ===
The Banu Ilyas were an Iranian dynasty of Sogdian origin which ruled Kerman from 932 until 968. Their capital was Bardasir.

=== Buyid (934–1062) ===
Buyid dynasty, also known as the Buyid Empire or the Buyids (Persian: بوییان Buyiān, Caspian: Bowyiyün), also known as Buwaihids or Buyyids, were a Shia Iranian dynasty that originated from Daylaman. They founded a confederation that controlled most of Iran and Iraq in the 10th and 11th centuries. Indeed, as Dailamite Iranians the Būyids consciously revived symbols and practices of Persia's Sassānid dynasty. In fact, beginning with 'Adud al-Daula they used the ancient Sassānid title Shāhanshāh (Persian: شاهنشاه), literally meaning king of kings.

=== Sallarid (942–979) ===
The Sallarid dynasty (also referred to as the Musafirids or Langarids) was an Islamic Persian dynasty principally known for its rule of Iranian Azerbaijan, Shirvan, and a part of Armenia from 942 until 979.

=== Shaddadid (951–1199) ===
The Shaddadids were a Kurdish Sunni Muslim dynasty. (Note: Qaṭrān claims the Shaddadids were of Sasanian origin.) who ruled in various parts of Armenia and Arran from 951 to 1199 AD. They were established in Dvin. Through their long tenure in Armenia, they often intermarried with the Bagratuni royal family of Armenia. (Note: "However, alongside Iranian traditions, the influence of the Shaddadids' Armenian neighbors and relatives was strong, hence the appearance of typically Armenian names such as Ašoṭ among members of the dynasty. Indeed, Qaṭrān even underlines the dynasty's Armenian ancestry, calling Fażlun "the glory of the Bagratid family" (Kasravi, p. 261).") (Note: "After the capture of Ani the following year, this old Bagratid capital was ruled by a Muslim dynasty, the Shaddädids. Although of Kurdish origin, they intermarried with Armenians. The first emir of Ani, Manüchihr, for example, was the son of an Armenian princess, and himself married an Armenian.")

=== Rawadid (955–1070/1116) ===
Rawwadid dynasty was a Sunni Muslim Kurdish dynasty, centered in the northwestern region of Adharbayjan (Azerbaijan) between the late 8th and early 13th centuries.

=== Hasanwayhid (959–1015) ===
Hasanwayhids was a powerful Shia Kurdish dynasty reigning the western parts of Iran such as Iranian Azerbaijan and Zagros Mountains between Shahrizor and Khuzestan from c. 959 to 1015. The last Hasanwayhid ruler died in 1015 in Sarmadj, south of Bisotun, as the Seljuks began entering the region.

=== Ghaznavid (977–1186) ===
The Ghaznavids were an Persianate Muslim dynasty and empire of Turkic mamluk origin, ruling at its greatest extent, large parts of Iran, Khorasan, and the northwest Indian subcontinent from 977 to 1186.

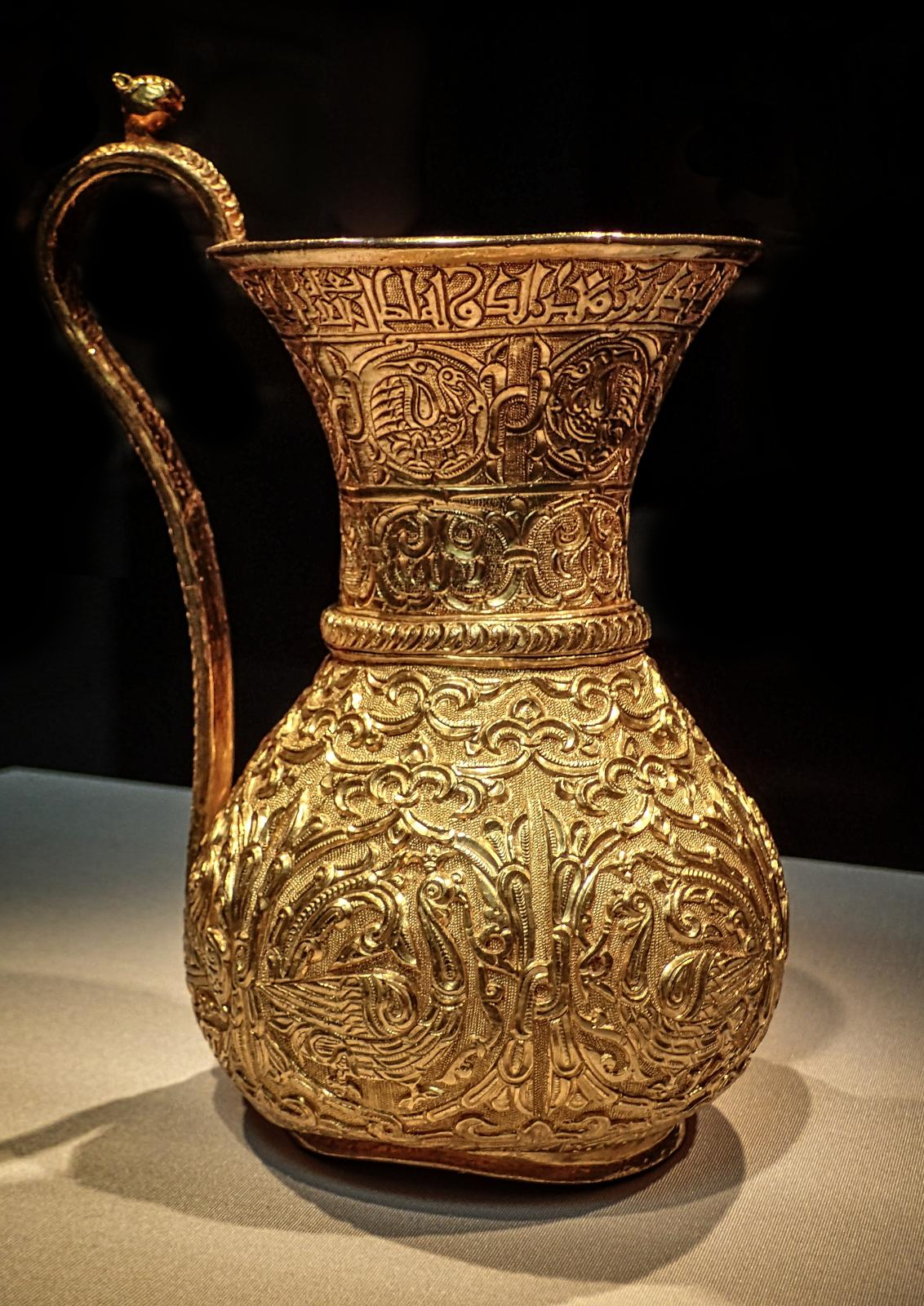
Gold ewer of the Buyid Period, mentioning Buyid ruler Izz al-Dawla Bakhtiyar ibn Mu'izz al-Dawla, 966-977 CE, Iran

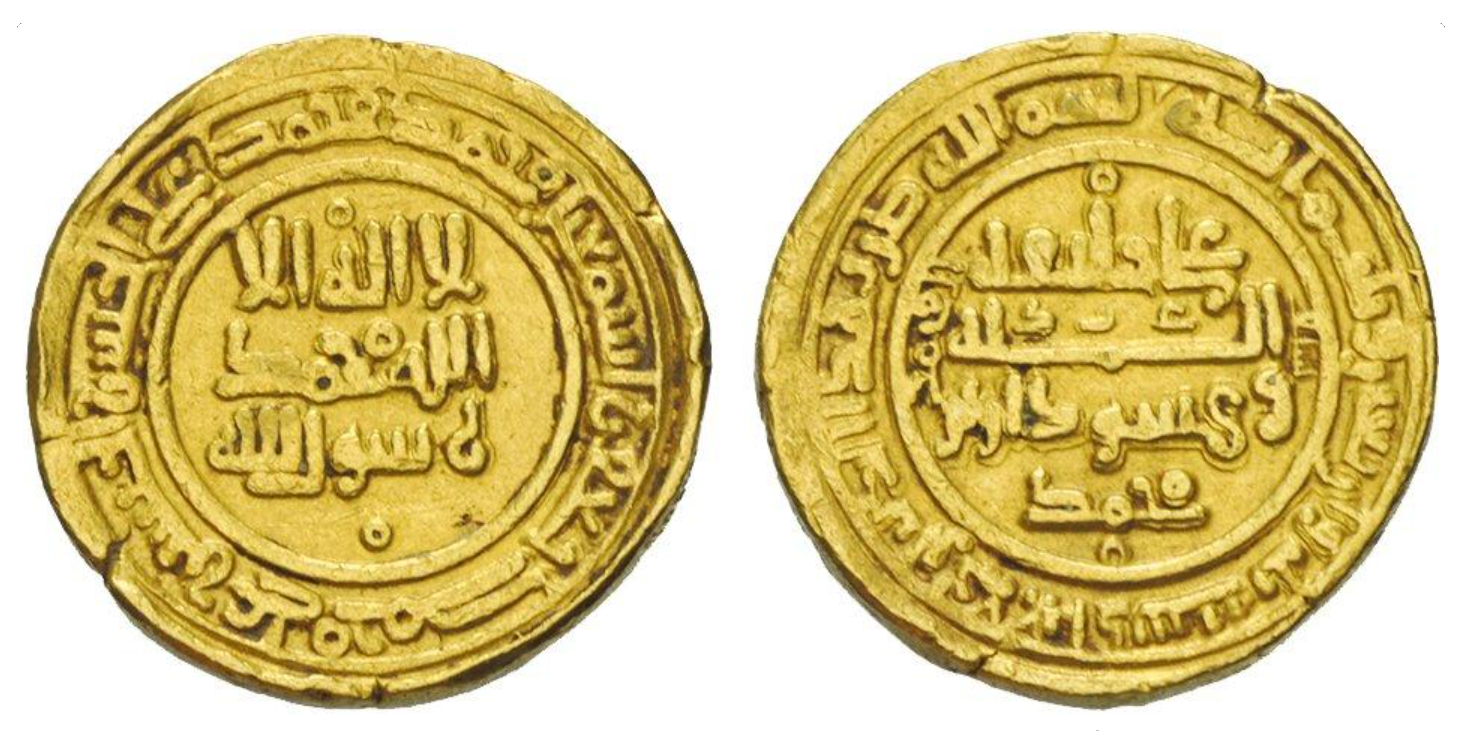
Coinage of Sallarid ruler Wahsudan ibn Muhammad, dated 954-5 CE

=== Marwanid (983/990–1084) ===
The Marwanids were a Kurdish Sunni Muslim dynasty in the Diyar Bakr region of Upper Mesopotamia (present day northern Iraq/southeastern Turkey) and Armenia, centered on the city of Amid (Diyarbakır).

=== Annazid (990/991–1117) ===
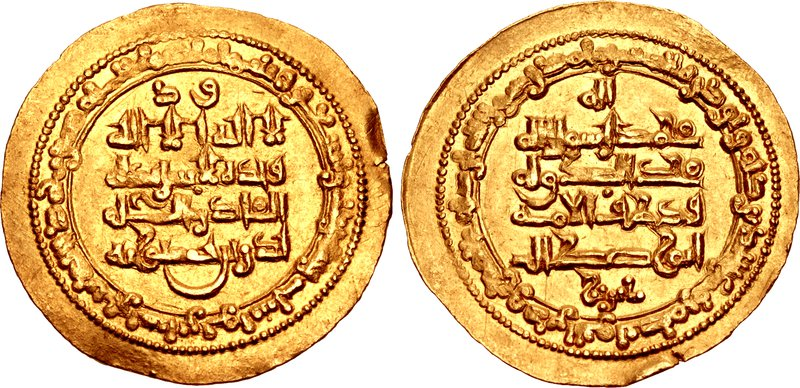
Coins issued by the Hasanwayhid dynasty

The Annazids was a Kurdish Sunni Muslim dynasty which ruled an oscillating territory on the frontier between Iran and present-day Iraq for about 130 years. The Annazids were related by marriage to the Hasanwayhids who they were in fierce rivalry with. The legitimacy of the Annazid rulers stemmed from the Buyid amir Bahāʾ al-Dawla and the dynasty relied on the Shadhanjan Kurds.

=== Kakuyid (1008–1141) ===
The Kakuyids (Persian: آل کاکویه) were a Shia Muslim dynasty of Daylamite origin that held power in western Iran, Jibal and Kurdistan (c. 1008–c. 1051). They later became atabegs (governors) of Yazd, Isfahan and Abarkuh from c. 1051 to 1141. They were related to the Buyids.

== In media ==
The Iranian Intermezzo features prominently in the video game Crusader Kings III, where it is a featured region in the 867 A.D. start date.

== See also ==
- Shi'a Century
- Nizari Ismaili state
  - Nizari–Seljuk conflicts
- Battle of Dayr al-Aqul
- Buyid capture of Baghdad (945)

== Sources ==
- Azakai, Parviz (2017), "آل حسنویه", Center for the Great Islamic Encyclopedia (in Persian)
- Gunter, Michael M. (2010), Historical Dictionary of the Kurds, Scarecrow Press, ISBN 9780810875074
- James, Boris (2019), "Constructing the Realm of the Kurds (al-Mamlaka al-Akradiyya): Kurdish In-betweenness and Mamluk Ethnic Engineering (1130-1340 CE)", Grounded Identities, pp. 17–45, doi:10.1163/9789004385337_003, ISBN 978-90-04-38532-0
- Kennedy, Hugh (2016). The Prophet and the Age of the Caliphates. Routledge. ISBN 978-1-317-37639-2.
- Peacock, Andrew (2011). "Shaddadids". Encyclopædia Iranica.
- Peacock, Andrew (2017). "Rawwadids". Encyclopædia Iranica, online edition. New York.
- Thomson, Robert W. (1996). Rewriting Caucasian History :The Medieval Armenian Adaptation of the Georgian Chronicles: The Original Georgian Texts and the Armenian Adaptation. Clarendon Press.
