= Daysam ibn Ibrahim al-Kurdi =

Occasional Kurdish ruler of Adharbayjan between 938–955

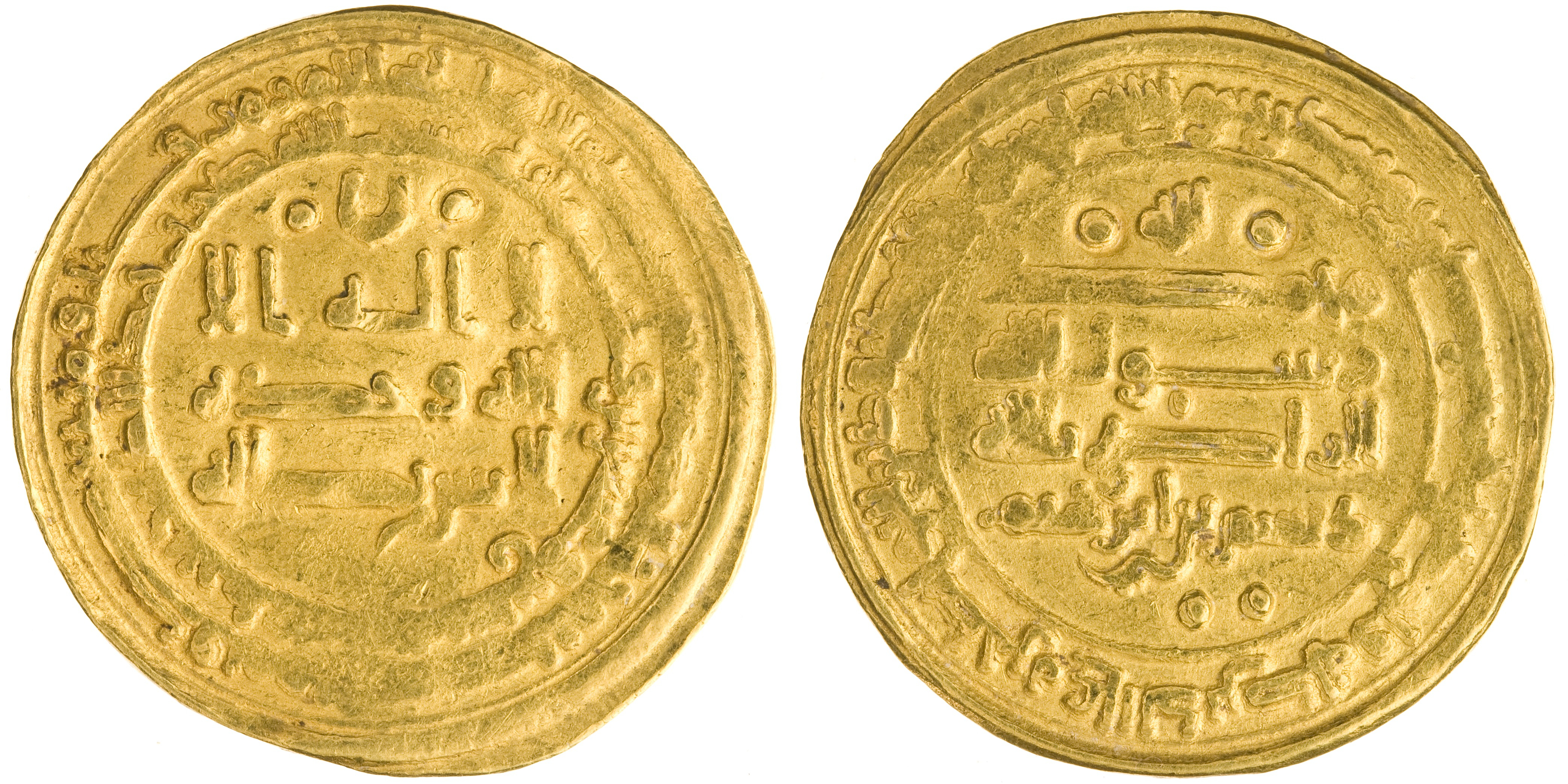
Gold dinar minted under the name of Daysam at Bardha‘a

Daysam ibn Ibrahim (or Daysam) or sometimes called Daysam ibn Ibrahim al-Kurdi (d. c. 957) was a Kurdish commander who occasionally ruled Adharbayjan between 938 and 955 during the power struggle that ensured after the fall of the Sajid dynasty.

== Life ==
Map of Adharbayjan

Daysam was a Kharijite, born to a Kurdish mother and an Arab or Kurdish father, who rose to prominence while serving the Sajid ruler Yusuf ibn Abi'l-Saj. With Kurdish support he managed to take over Adharbayjan by 938. His position in Adharbayjan was soon threatened by Lashkari ibn Mardi, a Gilite formerly in the service of the Ziyarids. Lashkari's Gilite and Daylamite army expelled Daysam from Adharbayjan, but he was able to recover the province with the help of the Ziyarid Vushmgir.

In 941 or 942 Daysam's vizier, Abu'l-Qasim Ja'far ibn 'Ali, fled due to an intrigue against him to the Sallarids of Tarum. There he convinced Marzuban ibn Muhammad (r. 941/2–957) to take Adharbayjan from Daysam. Daysam met Marzuban's army on the field by his Daylamite mercenaries (whom he had hired to counterbalance the power of his unruly Kurdish troops) defected to the Sallarid and he was forced to flee to the court of the Ardzrunid king of Vaspurakan. Ja'far ibn 'Ali became Marzuban's vizier after he conquered Adharbayjan, but soon feared for his position. He went to Tabriz and invited Daysam to return to the province. When he arrived at the city he gained the support of the Kurds. His army was defeated by Marzuban's, however, and the Sallarid besieged him in Tabriz. At this point Ja'far abandoned Daysam again, but Daysam managed to escape from Tabriz and enter Ardabil. Marzuban was not far behind and he laid siege to Ardabil. Eventually Daysam's new vizier, who had been bribed by the Sallarids, convinced Daysam to surrender. Daysam was treated with leniency by Marzuban, who gave him his castle in Tarum after he requested it.

In 949 Marzuban was captured by the Buyids, who sent an army under Abu Mansur Muhammad to conquer Adharbayjan. Marzuban's brother Wahsudan ibn Muhammad sent Daysam to Adharbayjan to protect Sallarid interests there. Abu Mansur Muhammad's approach forced Daysam to retreat to Arran, but after Abu Mansur Muhammad suffered a setback he retreated, allowing Daysam to take control of the province. Marzuban escaped from the Buyids in 953 and sought to regain his territory. Daysam was defeated by a Sallarid army near Ardabil, and the Daylamite leaders deserted from his side. He fled to Armenia, where he was given aid by the Christians. A year later, however, he was expelled from Armenia; he made his way to Baghdad, where the Buyid Mu'izz al-Dawla received him with honor.

After the Buyids made peace with the Sallarids, Daysam realized that he could not count on them for help in regaining Adharbayjan. He therefore left them for the Hamdanids; with the aid of Sayf al-Dawla of Aleppo he occupied Salmas in 955/956 as a Hamdanid vassal. Marzuban expelled from there, and Daysam again found refuge with the Ardzrunids of Vaspurakan. The Ardzunid king, however, facing threats from Marzuban, seized Daysam and handed him over to the Sallarid. Daysam was blinded and imprisoned. He was killed by some of Marzuban's supporters after the latter's death in 957.

== Sources ==
- Bosworth, C. Edmund (1994). "Daysam". In Yarshater, Ehsan (ed.). Encyclopædia Iranica. Vol. VII/2: Dastūr al-Afāżel–Dehqān I. London and New York: Routledge & Kegan Paul. pp. 172–173. ISBN 978-1-56859-020-2.
- Madelung, Wilferd (1975). "Minor dynasties of northern Iran". In Frye, Richard N. (ed.). The Cambridge History of Iran: From the Arab Invasion to the Saljuqs. Vol. 4. Cambridge: Cambridge University Press. pp. 198–250. ISBN 0-521-20093-8.
- Minorsky, Vladimir (1958). A History of Sharvān and Darband in the 10th-11th Centuries. Cambridge: W. Heffer & Sons, Ltd.

Preceded by Muflih al-Saji	Ruler of Adharbayjan; 938–942	Succeeded by Marzuban ibn Muhammad
