= Muflih al-Saji =

10th-century Army commander and governor

Muflih al-Saji (Arabic: مفلح الساجي) was a Muslim commander and governor of Adharbayjan (Iranian Azerbaijan) from c. 929 to c. 935.

== Biography ==
As his nisba indicates, he was a military slave of the Sajid ruler of Adharbayjan, Yusuf ibn Abi'l-Saj. After Yusuf died in 928, he was succeeded briefly as ruler by his nephew, and then by Wasif al-Shirvani in 929 as governor of Adharbayjan for the Abbasid Caliphate. He in turn was followed, likely in the same year, by Muflih. Muflih is first mentioned by Ibn al-Athir in office in 931, and held the post at least until 935, when the last coins struck in his name appear. After him the province was taken over by the Khariji Daysam ibn Ibrahim, likewise a former officer of Yusuf ibn Abi'l-Saj, in 937/8.

In 929, Muflih defeated the Byzantine Domestic of the Schools, John Kourkouas, in battle. The victorious Muflih then pursued the Byzantines into their own territory.

In 931, the Byzantines were engaged in southern Armenia, aiding the ruler of Vaspurakan, Gagik I, who had rallied the local Armenian princes and allied himself with the Byzantines against the local Muslim emirates; the Christian forces raided the Kaysite emirate and razed Khliat and Berkri to the ground, before marching into Upper Mesopotamia and capturing Samosata. Learning of this, Muflih assembled a "large army" and himself invaded Armenia, defeating Gagik and his Byzantine allies in a battle that according to Ibn al-Athir cost 100,000 Armenians their lives.

When Daysam took power in Adharbayjan, Muflih fled to Shirvan and sought refuge with the local autonomous ruler, Abu Tahir Yazid, but the latter handed him over to Daysam to avoid trouble.

== Sources ==
- Lilie, Ralph-Johannes; Ludwig, Claudia; Pratsch, Thomas; Zielke, Beate (2013). Prosopographie der mittelbyzantinischen Zeit Online. Berlin-Brandenburgische Akademie der Wissenschaften. Nach Vorarbeiten F. Winkelmanns erstellt (in German). Berlin and Boston: De Gruyter.
- Madelung, W. (1975). "The Minor Dynasties of Northern Iran". In Frye, Richard N. (ed.). The Cambridge History of Iran: From the Arab Invasion to the Saljuqs. Vol. 4. Cambridge: Cambridge University Press. pp. 198–249. ISBN 0-521-20093-8.
- Minorsky, Vladimir (1958). A History of Sharvān and Darband in the 10th-11th Centuries. Cambridge: W. Heffer & Sons, Ltd.
- Runciman, Steven (1988) [1929]. The Emperor Romanus Lecapenus and His Reign: A Study of Tenth-Century Byzantium. Cambridge: Cambridge University Press. ISBN 0-521-35722-5.
- Ter-Ghewondyan, Aram (1976) [1965]. The Arab Emirates in Bagratid Armenia. Translated by Garsoïan, Nina. Lisbon: Livraria Bertrand.

Preceded by Wasif al-Shirvani	Governor of Adharbayjan c. 929–935	Succeeded by Daysam ibn Ibrahim al-Kurdi
