= Justyn =

Justyn may refer to:

- Justyn Cassell (born 1967), former English rugby union player
- Justyn Knight (born 1996), Canadian long-distance track runner
- Justyn Martin, American football player
- Justyn Pogue, American artist and musician
- Justyn Ross (born 1999), American football wide receiver
- Justyn Vicky (1990–2023), American-Indonesian bodybuilder
- Justyn Warner (born 1987), Canadian track athlete
- Justyn Węglorz (born 1958), Polish former basketball player

== See also ==
- Justan (disambiguation)
- Justen (disambiguation)
- Justin (disambiguation)
- Juston (disambiguation)
