= Khurshid of Daylam =

Khurshid was a Justanid king who ruled briefly over Daylam in 865. He was the son and successor of Vahsudan of Daylam. Right after his accession, because of his opposition to his Alid overlord, he was deposed by the Alid Hasan ibn Zayd, who then made Khurshid's brother Justan III the new ruler of the Justanid dynasty.

== Sources ==
- Madelung, W. (1975). "The Minor Dynasties of Northern Iran". In Frye, R. N. (ed.). The Cambridge History of Iran, Volume 4: From the Arab Invasion to the Saljuqs. Cambridge: Cambridge University Press. pp. 198–249. ISBN 978-0-521-20093-6.

Preceded by Vahsudan	Justanid king 865	Succeeded by Justan III
