= Musafir ibn Ibrahim II =

Musafir ibn Ibrahim II (died 1062) was the last Sallarid ruler of Dailam (1050–1062). He was the son of Ibrahim II ibn Marzuban II, and brother of his predecessor Justan II ibn Ibrahim II. Not much is known about him. In 1062, the Seljuq ruler Tughril marched towards Musafir's capital Tarom, where he made Musafir acknowledge his authority and pay him 100,000 dinars in tribute. Shortly afterwards, the Ismailis seized Tarom and killed Musafir, putting an end to the Sallarid dynasty.

== Sources ==
- Madelung, W. (1975). "The Minor Dynasties of Northern Iran". In Frye, R.N. (ed.). The Cambridge History of Iran, Volume 4: From the Arab Invasion to the Saljuqs. Cambridge: Cambridge University Press. pp. 198–249. ISBN 978-0-521-20093-6.

Preceded by Justan II ibn Ibrahim II	Sallarid ruler of Daylam; 1050–1062	Succeeded by Ismaili conquest
