= Marzuban ibn Muhammad =

Sallarid ruler of Azerbaijan from 941/2 to 957

- Sallarid ruler of Azerbaijan
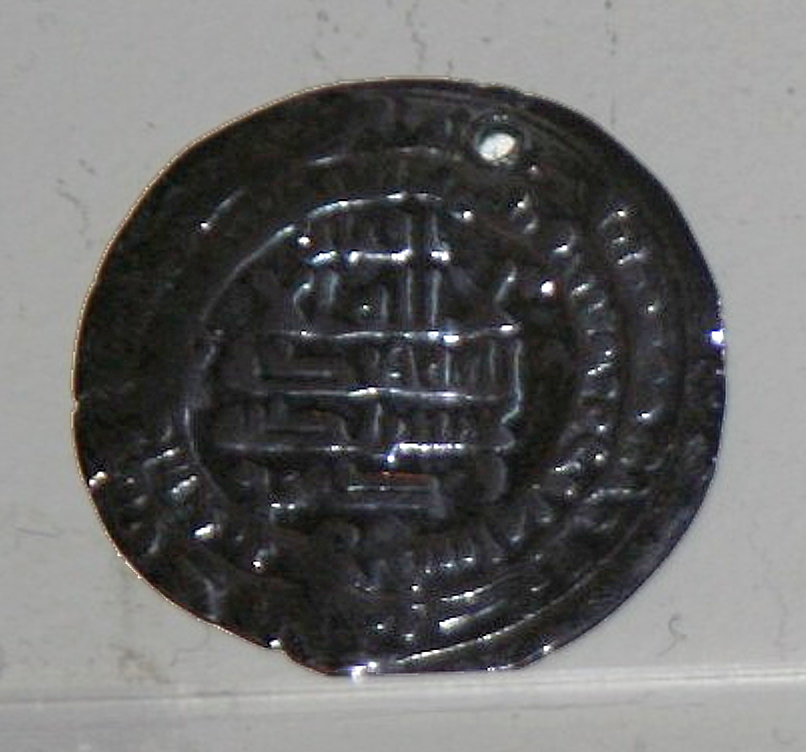
- Silver dirham of Marzban bin Muhammad. Museum of History of Azerbaijan, Baku

Emir of Azerbaijan
- Reign: 941/2 – 957
- Predecessor: Muhammad bin Musafir
- Successor: Justan I ibn Marzuban I Ibrahim I ibn Marzuban I
- Born: Unknown
- Died: 957
- House: Sallarid
- Father: Muhammad bin Musafir
- Religion: Islam

Marzuban ibn Muhammad (died 957) was the Sallarid ruler of Azerbaijan (941/42–957). He was the son of Muhammad bin Musafir, the ruler of Tarum.

== Takeover of Azerbaijan ==
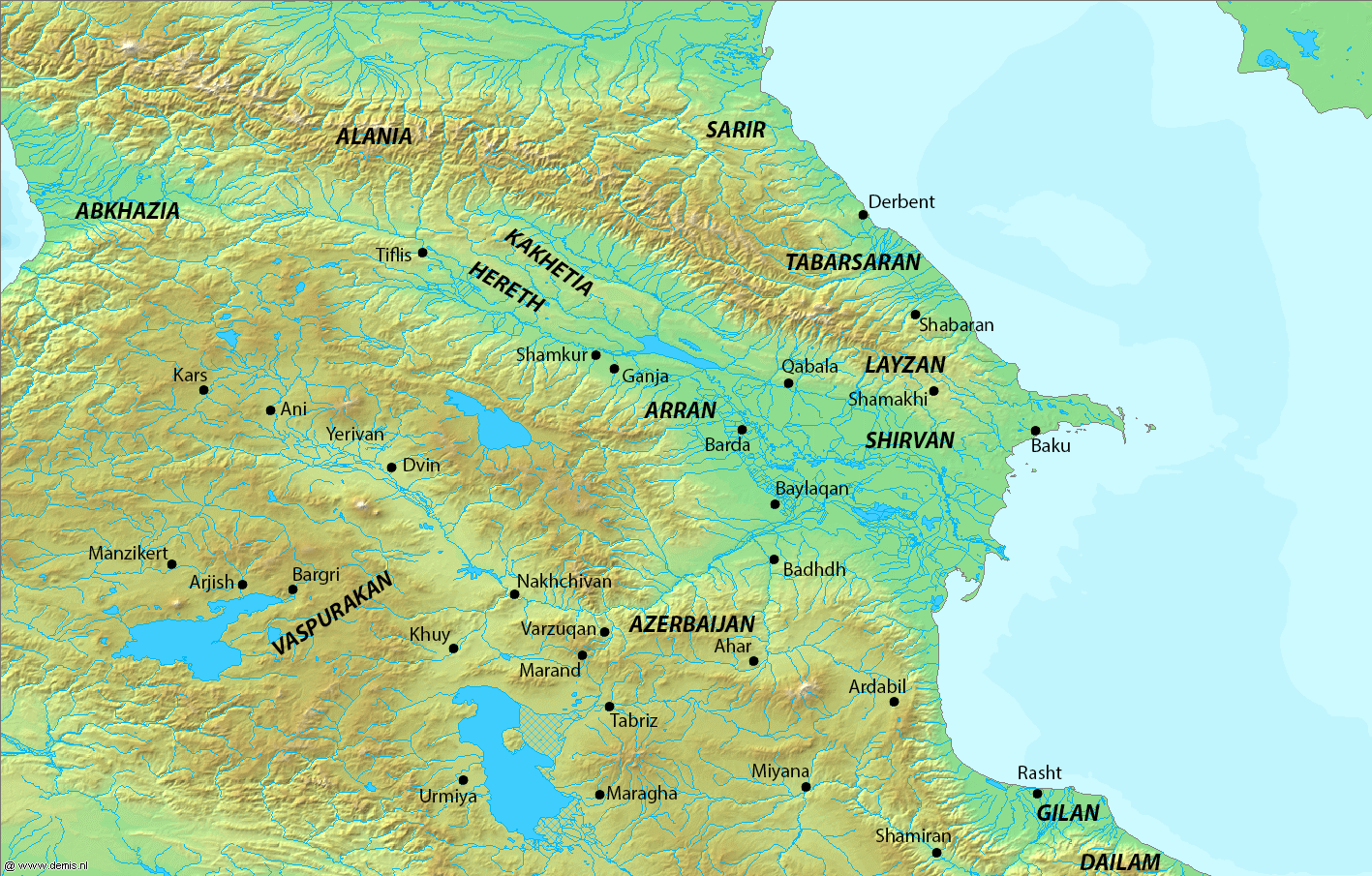
Map of Azerbaijan and Caucasus.

In 941 Marzuban and his brother Wahsudan ibn Muhammad, with the tacit approval of their mother, deposed and imprisoned their father Muhammad, whose harsh governance had alienated many of his subjects. Wahsudan replaced Muhammad as the ruler of Tarum. Muhammad, however, was approached by Abu'l-Qasim Ja'far b. 'Ali, the vizier of the ruler of Azerbaijan, Daisam. Ja'far, who had fled Azerbaijan, offered Marzuban the chance to overthrow his master and take over the administration of the province. Ja'far, Marzuban and Wahsudan were all Isma'ilis, perhaps explaining Ja'far's decision to turn to them. In any case, Marzuban agreed and invaded Azerbaijan. Daisam's Dailamite troops defected to the Sallarid and Marzuban was able to occupy Ardebil and Tabriz, while Daisam fled to the Ardzrunids of Vaspurakan.

Although Marzuban made Ja'far his vizier, the latter began to fear for his position. He went to Tabriz and invited Daisam to come there, then killed the Dailamite leaders of the city. Daisam returned and gained the allegiance of the Kurds, who were unhappy with Marzuban's administration. Marzuban and his Dailamites, however, defeated them and laid siege to Tabriz. He convinced Ja'far to leave Daisam's side; Ja'far was stripped of his position as vizier, although he was later reinstated.

Daisam and his followers, however, managed to escape from Tabriz before it fell and made their way to Ardebil. Marzuban, with aid from his brother Wahsudan, besieged the town. He bribed Daisam's vizier to convince him to surrender, which he did in 942 or 943. Daisam was allowed to take charge of Marzuban's castle in Tarum. The people of Arbedil, however, were punished for their treason; a heavy tribute was forced upon them and they had to dismantle the town wall.

After establishing his rule in Azerbaijan proper, Marzuban sought to expand his authority to the north and west. The Shirvanshah, for example, had to face an invasion of his territories by Marzuban's Dailamites; he defeated them but eventually agreed to become Marzuban's vassal and pay tribute. By 945 he had also taken over Dvin. This policy of expansion was effective, for by the end of his reign Marzuban had gained the allegiance of most of the minor princes of the Caucasus and Armenia.

== Invasion by the Rus and Hamdanids ==
In the spring of 945 the Rus invaded Azerbaijan. Coming up the Kura River, they occupied Barda (for details of this occupation, see Caspian expeditions of the Rus). Marzuban's army, which included many volunteers eager to fight the infidel Rus, was numerically superior to the raiders. Despite this, the Sallarid army was defeated several times. It was only after the Rus had been weakened by disease that he managed to ambush and kill 700 of them.

Marzuban then laid siege to Barda, but received news that the Hamdanid amir of Mosul, Nasir al-Daula, had sent his nephew al-Husain b. Sa'id to take over Azerbaijan. In 942, during the war between Marzuban and Daisam, al-Husain had been invested with the government of the province by the caliph, and now he intended to make good on his claim. The Hamdanid had reached Salmas and had gained the support of the Kurds. Marzuban left a small force to keep the Rus in check, and in a winter campaign (945-946) defeated al-Husain. A short time later al-Husain was recalled by Nasir al-Daula, who was preparing for a war against the Buwayhid amir of Baghdad. The Rus meanwhile decided to leave, taking as much loot and prisoners as they could.

== Capture by the Buwayhids ==
In around 948 Marzuban, angered by an insult his envoy had received from the Buwayhid amir of Jibal, Rukn al-Daula, decided to take the city of Ray as punishment. Rukn al-Daula managed to delay Marzuban's campaign through diplomatic means, giving him time to gather reinforcements from his brothers. At Qazvin Marzuban's army was defeated and he was captured.

The Dailamite officers who had managed to escape from the battle at Qazvin decided to rally around Marzuban's father Muhammad, who was still in prison. They released him and occupied Ardebil, but Muhammad soon alienated them and was forced to flee to Tarum. Wahsudan imprisoned him and sent Daisam to Azerbaijan, in the hopes that he could aid the sons of Marzuban against an army sent by Rukn al-Daula and led by Muhammad b. 'Abd al-Razziq. The latter soon decided to withdraw, allowing Daisam to take over Azerbaijan. This momentary weakness in the central administration allowed the Rawadids and Shaddadids to take control of the areas to the northeast of Tabriz and Dvin, respectively.

== Return and Death ==
In 953 Marzuban escaped from prison and sent an army to remove Daisam from power. The Sallarid army defeated him near Ardebil and forced him to flee to Armenia. In 954/5 Marzuban made peace with Rukn al-Daula, who married his daughter. He also reestablished his rule in other parts of Azerbaijan. He expelled the Shaddadids from Dvin; the Rawadids kept their territory but were forced to pay tribute.

In 955 or 956 Daisam occupied Salmas with the support of the Hamdanid amir of Aleppo, Saif al-Daula. Marzuban, who had been putting down a revolt in Derbent, returned and defeated him. Daisam fled to Vaspurakan, but its king, responding to threats by Marzuban, handed him over to the Sallarid. He was blinded and imprisoned, ending his threat to the Sallarids.

Marzuban died in 957. His will originally called for his three sons Justan, Ibrahim and Nasir to succeed him in turn. He later changed his mind and named his brother Wahsudan of Tarum as his successor, but he forgot to cancel his original will, resulting in an eruption of warfare after his death; for details of this, see Sallarids.

== Notes ==
| Preceded by Daisam | Sallarid ruler of Azerbaijan; 941/2–957 | Succeeded by Justan I ibn Marzuban I |
