= Justinus =

Justinus may refer to:

- Justinus van der Brugghen (1804–1863), Dutch politician
- Justinus Darmojuwono (1914–1994), Indonesian cardinal
- Justinus Kerner (1786–1862), German poet
- Justinus van Nassau (1559–1631), Dutch army commander, only illegitimate son of William of Orange
- Oskar Justinus (1839–1893), German dramatist

== See also ==
- Justin (historian) (Marcus Junianius Junianus Justinus), 2nd century Latin historian who lived under the Roman Empire
- Justin Martyr (also "Iustinus", 100–165), Christian martyr
- Justin (disambiguation)
