= Justan I ibn Marzuban I =

- Sallarid ruler of Azerbaijan
- Reign: 957–960
- Predecessor: Marzuban ibn Muhammad
- Successor: Ismail ibn Wahsudan
- Born: Unknown
- Died: 960
- House: Sallarid
- Father: Marzuban ibn Muhammad
- Religion: Islam

Justan I ibn Marzuban (died 960) was the Sallarid ruler of Azerbaijan (957–960). He was the son and successor of Marzuban ibn Muhammad.

== Life and career ==
Marzuban ibn Muhammad had designated his brother Wahsudan ibn Muhammad as his successor. When he came to Azerbaijan, however, the commanders of the fortresses refused to surrender to him, recognizing instead Marzuban's son Justan I ibn Marzuban I as his successor. Unable to establish his rule in the province, Wahusdan returned to Tarum; Justan was recognized as ruler in Azerbaijan, with his brother Ibrahim I ibn Marzuban I made governor of Dvin. Justan seems to have been interested primarily in his harem, a fact which alienated some of his supporters, although he and Ibrahim successfully put down a revolt by a grandson of the caliph al-Muktafi in 960.

Shortly afterwards Justan and another brother, Nasir, came to Tarum, where they were treacherously imprisoned by Wahsudan, who sent his son Ismail ibn Wahsudan to take over Azerbaijan. Ibrahim raised an army in Armenia to oppose Ismail, prompting Wahsudan to execute Justan, his mother and Nasir. Ibrahim was driven out of Azerbaijan by Ismail, but retained his rule in Dvin.

== Sources ==
- Madelung, W. (1975). "The Minor Dynasties of Northern Iran". In Frye, R.N. (ed.). The Cambridge History of Iran, Volume 4: From the Arab Invasion to the Saljuqs. Cambridge: Cambridge University Press. pp. 198–249. ISBN 978-0-521-20093-6.
- Bosworth, C. E. (1975). "Iran under the Buyids". In Frye, R. N. (ed.). The Cambridge History of Iran, Volume 4: From the Arab Invasion to the Saljuqs. Cambridge: Cambridge University Press. pp. 250–305. ISBN 0-521-20093-8.

Preceded by Marzuban ibn Muhammad	Sallarid ruler of Azerbaijan; 957–960	Succeeded by Ismail ibn Wahsudan
