= Justine Hastings =

American economist, academic, and policy advisor

Justine Hastings is an American economist, academic, and policy advisor. She was previously a vice president and chief of people-centered science at Amazon and an affiliate professor of economics at the University of Washington. Previously, she served as professor of economics and international and public affairs at Brown University, and as an associate professor of economics at Yale University. Her research focuses on combining economics and big data to solve social problems, spanning topics across education policy, retirement policy, household finance, marketing, competition, antitrust, and environmental regulation.

Hastings served on the Academic Research Council for the United States Consumer Financial Protection Bureau (CFPB), and on the Council of Economic Advisors to the Governor of Rhode Island. She has served as a managing editor for the International Journal of Industrial Organization, and as co-editor of the Journal of Public Economics. She has also advised state and federal agencies in matters related to antitrust, energy and environmental regulation.

Research led by Hastings on the importance of providing parents with information about the benefits of school choice alternatives was cited in Nudge, the 2008 New York Times bestseller by Richard H. Thaler and Cass R. Sunstein. Her research on mental accounting and consumer purchasing behavior was cited in the Scientific Background for Thaler's 2017 Nobel Prize. Hastings' subsequent research measured how mental accounting impacts grocery spending for Supplemental Nutrition Assistance Program (SNAP) participants.

Hastings helped found Research Improving People's Lives (RIPL), which was established as a non-profit science and technology organization in 2018, with the goal of helping state and local governments use data, science, and technology to improve outcomes for communities.

In 2018, Hastings and RIPL partnered with Governor Gina Raimondo, the Rhode Island Department of Education, and the Chan Zuckerberg Initiative to launch Rhode2College, a statewide incentive program designed to encourage low- and moderate-income high school students to apply to and attend college. Over 4 years, the program has served more than 1,400 low-income juniors and seniors.

In March 2020, when the economic shutdown caused by the COVID-19 emergency resulted in an unprecedented surge in unemployment claims that threatened to overwhelm the state's legacy systems used to collect, process, and pay claims, Hastings and RIPL led an effort with the Rhode Island Department of Labor and Training to create a scalable cloud solution to collect pandemic unemployment assistance claims.

She started in Dec 2020 at Amazon as a VP and leads the PXTCS (People Experience and Technology Central Science) team. It's reported in Dec 2022 that she has been investigated by the company for creating a toxic work environment. An Amazon spokesperson said the allegations against Hastings were “inaccurate, contradictory" and do not "reflect the reality of the situation."

== Education ==
Hastings holds a PhD in economics from the University of California, Berkeley.

== Bibliography ==
- "Justine S. Hastings". EconPapers.
- Justine Hastings publications indexed by Google Scholar
- Justine S. Hastings; Jeffrey Weinstein (2007). Information, School Choice, and Academic Achievement: Evidence from Two Experiments. National Bureau of Economic Research. OCLC 185060044.
