= Justine Verdier =

French pianist

Justine Verdier (sometimes Soraya Verdier) (born in Paris) is a French pianist.

== Life ==
French pianist Justine/Soraya Verdier was born in 1985, in Paris. She began playing piano at the age of four and a half at the Musical Institute of Paris with Michel Denis. Verdier studied with Prof. Karl-Heinz Kämmerling and Pavel Gililov at the Mozarteum University in Salzburg where she gained a master's degree with honors. She was the "Bärenreiter" Prizewinner at the 10th International Mozart Competition in Salzburg. Currently, she lives in Paris.
