= Justine Tunney =

American software developer and activist (b. 1984)

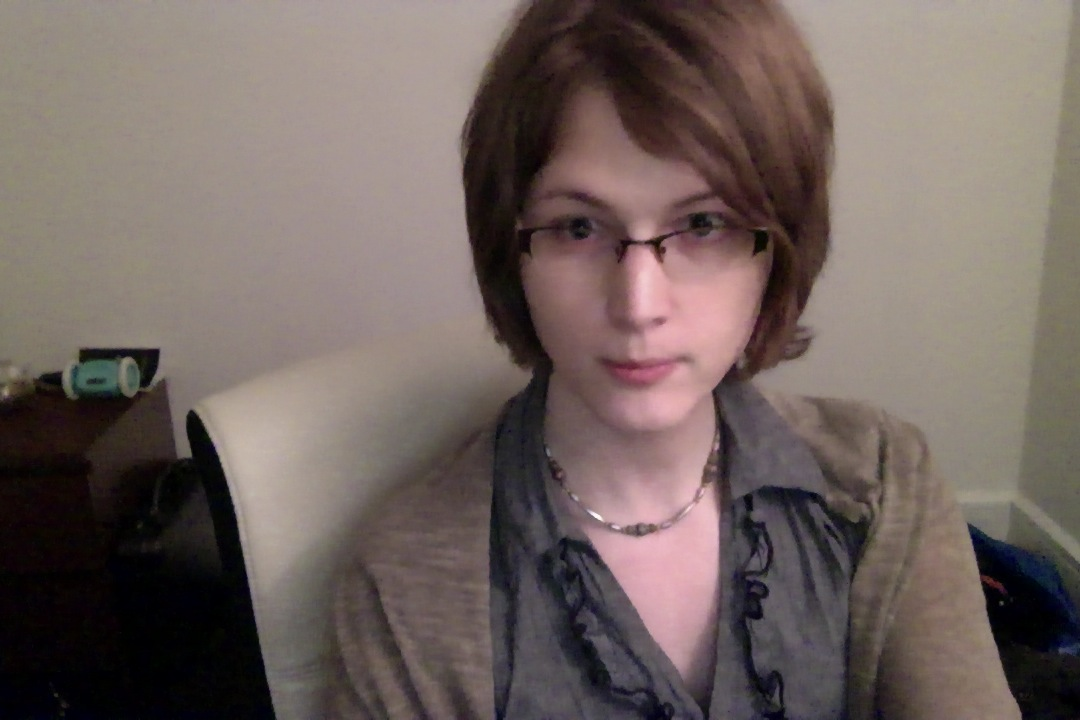
- Born: 1984 (age 41–42)
- Occupation: Software developer

Justine Alexandra Roberts Tunney (born 1984) is an American software developer and a former activist for Occupy Wall Street.

== Biography ==
Tunney started publishing software in 1998. She built software for other hackers and fiddled with AOL.

In 1999, at the age of 14, Tunney used the nickname "Oogle". Around that time, Christopher Neuman registered the domain name oogle.com. In 2012, Google tried to obtain the domain in a UDRP case but did not meet all ICANN requirements for it. Neuman stated that he registered it because he intended to collaborate with Tunney. (Note: PC World did not note the view of Tunney on this matter)

In July 2011, Tunney registered the @occupywallst Twitter handle and occupywallst.org domain, which became the main online hub for the Occupy movement.

In 2012, Tunney started working for Google as a software engineer. In March 2014, Tunney petitioned the US government on We the People to hold a referendum asking for support to retire all government employees with full pensions, transfer administrative authority to the technology industry, and appoint the executive chairman of Google Eric Schmidt as CEO of America. Tunney has been inspired by the political views of Curtis Yarvin.

In 2016, Tunney discovered that open-source software projects on GitHub depended on an Apache Commons library with a security vulnerability. She started opening pull requests with fixes and recruited 50 fellow Google employees to help during their 20% time. They used BigQuery to enumerate vulnerable projects, of which 2,600 were found. She noted that the San Francisco Municipal Transportation Agency became a ransomware victim due to the vulnerability.

Tunney wrote a C library and web server named Redbean 2 that runs on multiple platforms as a single binary. The Register called the project "a bunch of almost unbelievably clever tech tricks".

On October 31, 2023, Tunney released the third edition of Cosmopolitan, the libc implementation used to make Redbean, which compiles a single binary that runs on multiple operating systems.

== Llamafile ==
In November 2023, Tunney, working with Mozilla's innovation group, released the first version of llamafile, an open-source tool built on Cosmopolitan that packages large language model weights into a single executable file capable of running on multiple operating systems without installation. As lead developer, Tunney continued to release performance improvements to the project, at one point making it between 1.3 and 5 times faster than the underlying llama.cpp framework for CPU-based inference.

In July 2024, Tunney presented llamafile alongside Mozilla Builders project lead Stephen Hood at the AI Engineer World's Fair in San Francisco, where the two also introduced the Mozilla Builders accelerator program.
