= Justina Sharp =

American blogger (born 1997)

- Born: October 2, 1997 (age 27); Sacramento, California, U.S.
- Education: California State University, Fullerton

Justina Sharp (born October 2, 1997) is an American fashion and beauty influencer, blogger, journalist, advice columnist, and social justice advocate. She is a fashion influencer who has collaborated with fashion and beauty brands such as Smashbox, American Eagle, and IKEA through her blog A Bent Piece Of Wire.

== Early life and education ==
Sharp was born October 2, 1997, in Sacramento, California to John and Heike Sharp. Sharp is mixed-race, and has identified herself as German-American. She was homeschooled until she graduated high school at age 16. Sharp previously studied at American River College in Sacramento, and is currently a junior at California State University, Fullerton.

== Career ==
At 13 years old, Sharp founded and has served as editor of her fashion, entertainment and lifestyle site A Bent Piece of Wire since 2011. Her site is best known for its fashion and beauty content, interviews with up-and-coming and established figures in the fashion and entertainment industries, including Laura Brown, Rebecca Black, and R5. as well as extensive skincare reviews and travel coverage. Justina is active on social media, especially Instagram and Twitter, with an estimated 60,000 followers across platforms. She has been featured in Teen Vogue, Vogue Italia, NPR, Buzzfeed, the Huffington Post, and more. Her weekly advice column is published to her Instagram and focuses on relationships and self-help. Sharp has also written on relationships for other platforms, including Oakland-based YR Media.

Sharp is also the adult director of a residential summer camp in Northern California

== Controversy ==
Sharp first gained national attention after her article "I'm A Barbie Girl, In The Real World" was published by the Huffington Post in February 2014. She also defended Sports Illustrated's decision to run a feature on Barbie, saying "Barbie is the doll that shaped the childhood of millions, including mine". Sharp guest-wrote a follow-up op-ed piece for The New York Times and appeared on the Today Show.

Sharp has been the target of online harassment relating to her views on abortion, race discrimination, and gender inequality.
