= Saint Justin =

Saint Justin may refer to:

== People ==
- Justin Martyr (103–165)
- Justin the Confessor (died 269)
- Justin of Chieti, venerated as an early bishop of Chieti, Italy
- Justin of Siponto (c. 4th century), venerated as Christian martyrs by the Catholic Church
- Justin de Jacobis (1800–1860), Italian Lazarist missionary who became Vicar Apostolic of Abyssinia and titular Bishop of Nilopolis
- Justin of Ćelije (1894–1979), also known as Justin Popović, Serbian Orthodox monk and theologian

== Places ==
- Saint Justin School, a Catholic elementary school in Santa Clara, California
- St Justin Catholic School, a Catholic elementary school in Edmonton, Alberta

== See also ==
- San Giustino, commune
