= Wahsudan ibn Muhammad =

Sallarid ruler of Daylam in Iran from 941/2 to 967

- Sallarid ruler of Daylam
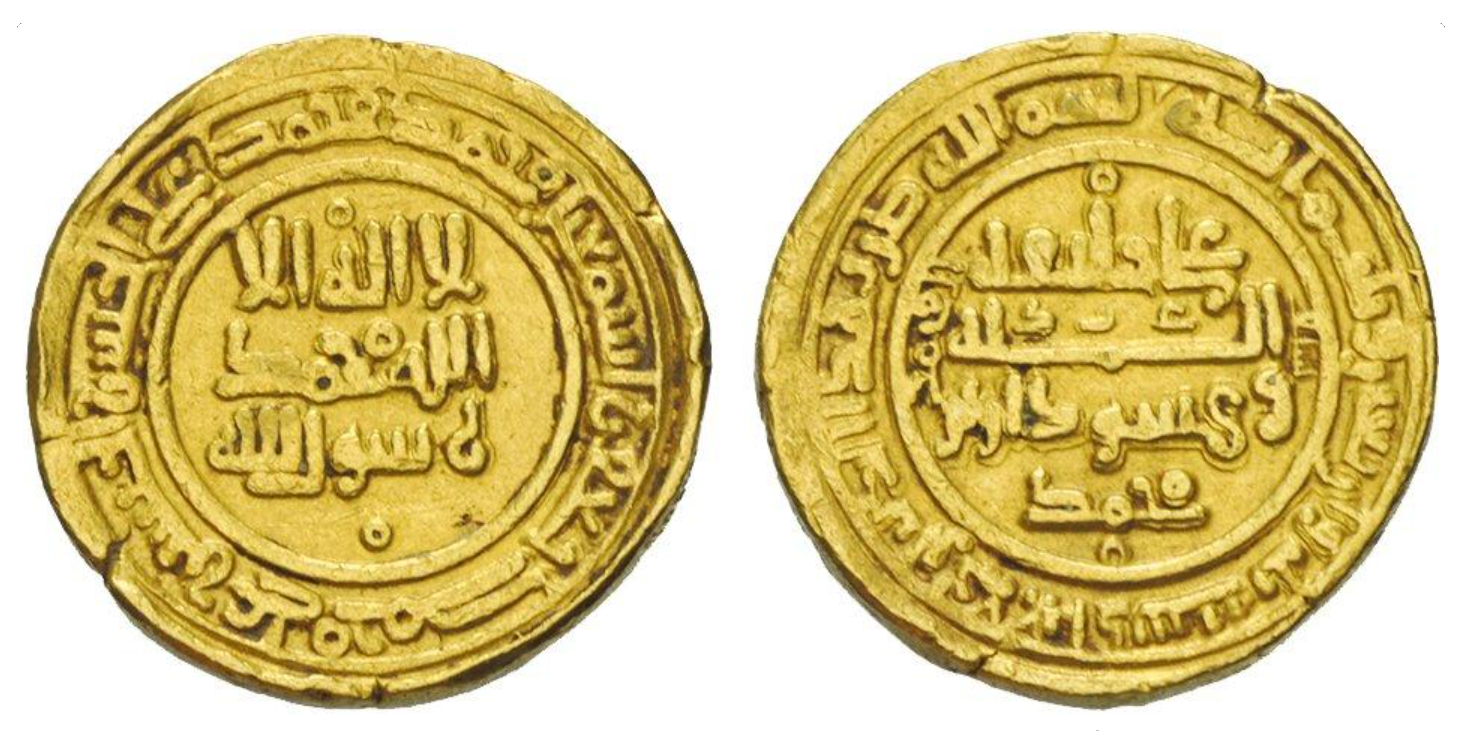
- Coinage of Wahsudan ibn Muhammad, dated 954-5 CE
- Reign: 941/2–967
- Predecessor: Muhammad bin Musafir
- Successor: Marzuban II ibn Ismail
- Born: Unknown
- Died: 967
- House: Sallarid
- Father: Muhammad bin Musafir
- Religion: Islam

Wahsudan ibn Muhammad (died 967) was the Sallarid ruler of Daylam (941/2–967). He was the son of Muhammad bin Musafir, the ruler of Tarum.

== Conquest of Azerbaijan ==
In 941 Wahsudan and his brother Marzuban ibn Muhammad, with the tacit approval of their mother, deposed and imprisoned their father Muhammad, whose harsh governance had alienated many of his subjects. Wahsudan replaced Muhammad as the ruler of Tarum. Muhammad, however, was approached by Abu'l-Qasim Ja'far b. 'Ali, the vizier of the ruler of Azerbaijan, Daisam. Ja'far, who had fled Azerbaijan, offered Marzuban the chance to overthrow his master and take over the administration of the province. Ja'far, Marzuban and Wahsudan were all Isma'ilis, perhaps explaining Ja'far's decision to turn to them. In any case, Marzuban agreed and invaded Azerbaijan. Daisam's Dailamite troops defected to the Sallarid and Marzuban was able to occupy Ardebil and Tabriz, while Daisam fled to the Ardzrunids of Vaspurakan.

Although Marzuban made Ja'far his vizier, the latter began to fear for his position. He went to Tabriz and invited Daisam to come there, then killed the Dailamite leaders of the city. Daisam returned and gained the allegiance of the Kurds, who were unhappy with Marzuban's administration. Marzuban and his Dailamites, however, defeated them and laid siege to Tabriz. He convinced Ja'far to leave Daisam's side; Ja'far was stripped of his position as vizier, although he was later reinstated. Daisam and his followers, however, managed to escape from Tabriz before it fell and made their way to Ardebil. Marzuban, with aid from his brother Wahsudan, besieged the town. He bribed Daisam's vizier to convince him to surrender, which he did in 942 or 943. Daisam was allowed to take charge of Marzuban's castle in Tarum. The people of Ardebil, however, were punished for their treason; a heavy tribute was forced upon them and they had to dismantle the town wall.

== War against the Buyids and Kurdish tribes ==
In around 948 Marzuban, angered by an insult his envoy had received from the Buyid amir of Jibal, Rukn al-Dawla, decided to take the city of Ray as punishment. Rukn al-Dawla managed to delay Marzuban's campaign through diplomatic means, giving him time to gather reinforcements from his brothers. At Qazvin Marzuban's army was defeated and he was captured.

The Dailamite officers who had managed to escape from the battle at Qazvin decided to rally around Marzuban's father Muhammad, who was still in prison. They released him and occupied Ardebil, but Muhammad soon alienated them and was forced to flee to Tarum. Wahsudan imprisoned him and sent Daisam to Azerbaijan, in the hopes that he could aid the sons of Marzuban against an army sent by Rukn al-Dawla and led by Abu Mansur Muhammad. The latter soon decided to withdraw, allowing Daisam to take over Azerbaijan. This momentary weakness in the central administration allowed the Rawadids and Shaddadids to take control of the areas to the northeast of Tabriz and Dvin, respectively.

In 953, Marzuban escaped from prison and sent an army to remove Daisam from power. The Sallarid army defeated him near Ardebil and forced him to flee to Armenia. In 954/5 Marzuban made peace with Rukn al-Dawla, who married his daughter. He also reestablished his rule in other parts of Azerbaijan. He expelled the Shaddadids from Dvin; the Rawadids kept their territory but were forced to pay tribute.

== Struggle for supremacy and death ==
Wahsudan had been designated by his brother Marzuban as his successor. When Wahsudan came to Azerbaijan, however, the commanders of the fortresses refused to surrender to him, recognizing instead Marzuban's son Justan I ibn Marzuban I as his successor. Unable to establish his rule in the province, Wahsudan returned to Tarum; Justan was recognized as ruler in Azerbaijan, with his brother Ibrahim I ibn Marzuban I made governor of Dvin. Justan seems to have been interested primarily in his harem, a fact which alienated some of his supporters, although he and Ibrahim successfully put down a revolt by a grandson of the caliph al-Muktafi in 960.

Shortly afterwards Justan and another brother, Nasir, came to Tarum, where they were treacherously imprisoned by Wahsudan, who sent his son Isma'il to take over Azerbaijan. Ibrahim raised an army in Armenia to oppose Isma'il, prompting Wahsudan to execute Justan, his mother and Nasir. Ibrahim was driven out of Azerbaijan by Isma'il, but retained his rule in Dvin.

Isma'il died in 962, however, allowing Ibrahim to occupy Azerbaijan. He then invaded Tarum and forced Wahsudan to flee to Dailaman. In 966, Wahsudan defeated Ibrahim, and was further joined by the latter's deserted soldiers. Ibrahim then fled to his brother-in-law, the Buyid Rukn al-Dawla, while Wahsudan installed his son Nuh in Azerbaijan. Rukn al-Dawla sent an army under his vizier to reinstate Ibrahim in Azerbaijan, and Wahsudan was ejected from Tarum for a time. In 967 however he again sent an army, which burnt Ardabil before Ibrahim concluded a peace with his uncle, ceding part of Azerbaijan to him. Wahsudan shortly died after that, and was succeeded by Marzuban II ibn Ismail.

== Sources ==
- Madelung, W. (1975). "The Minor Dynasties of Northern Iran". In Frye, R.N. (ed.). The Cambridge History of Iran, Volume 4: From the Arab Invasion to the Saljuqs. Cambridge: Cambridge University Press. pp. 198–249. ISBN 978-0-521-20093-6.
- Bosworth, C. E. (1975). "Iran under the Buyids". In Frye, R. N. (ed.). The Cambridge History of Iran, Volume 4: From the Arab Invasion to the Saljuqs. Cambridge: Cambridge University Press. pp. 250–305. ISBN 0-521-20093-8.

Preceded by Muhammad bin Musafir	Sallarid ruler of Daylam; 941/2–967	Succeeded by Marzuban II ibn Ismail
