= Justine Otto =

German painter (born 1974)

- Education: State Academy of Fine Arts
- Known for: painting

Justine Otto (born 1974) is a German painter.

== Life ==
Otto was born in Poland. In 1983, she moved to Germany. Between 1997 and 2000, she worked as a stage designer at the Municipal Theatre Frankfurt. In 1996, she studied at the State Academy of Fine Arts (Städelschule) in Frankfurt am Main, and was a master student in professional free painting, where she studied with Peter Angermann and Michael Krebber. In 2003, she graduated. Otto lives in Hamburg and Frankfurt.

== Works ==
The central theme of her work are adolescent people and their feelings. Otto leaves its protagonists, mostly young girls, make puzzling actions. Otto takes a neutral observer position and confronts the viewer with the process of growing up. By soft merging into one another light and shadow zones interrupted by harsh color accents, it produces a strong vitality. This creates body landscapes that their characters a strong authenticity.

== Awards ==
- 2005: Volker-Hinniger Prize
- 2005: nominated for the Ernst Schering Foundation Art of the Ernst Schering Foundation
- 2011: Winner of the Art Prize of the Lüneburg Regional Association

== Exhibitions ==
- 1997: portico, Frankfurt
- 2001: Darmstadt Secession at the Mathildenhöhe / Darmstadt
- 2002: Exhibition Hall, Frankfurt am Main
- 2003: Städel, Frankfurt am Main
- 2006: Kunsthalle der Hypo-Kulturstiftung, Munich
- 2007: Kunstverein Aschaffenburg
- 2009: Collection Rusche, Schloss Corvey
- 2009: Collection Rusche, Museum Abbey Liesborn
- 2010: Bomann Museum
- 2011: Kunsthalle Darmstadt
- 2011: Kunsthalle Villa Kobe, Halle / Saale
- 2011: Museum Schloss Gifhorn
- 2012: Jesuit Church Art Gallery, Aschaffenburg
