= Justan III =

Justan III was the sixth king of the Justanid dynasty, ruling from 865 to 919. He was the brother and successor of Khurshid of Dailam.

== Biography ==
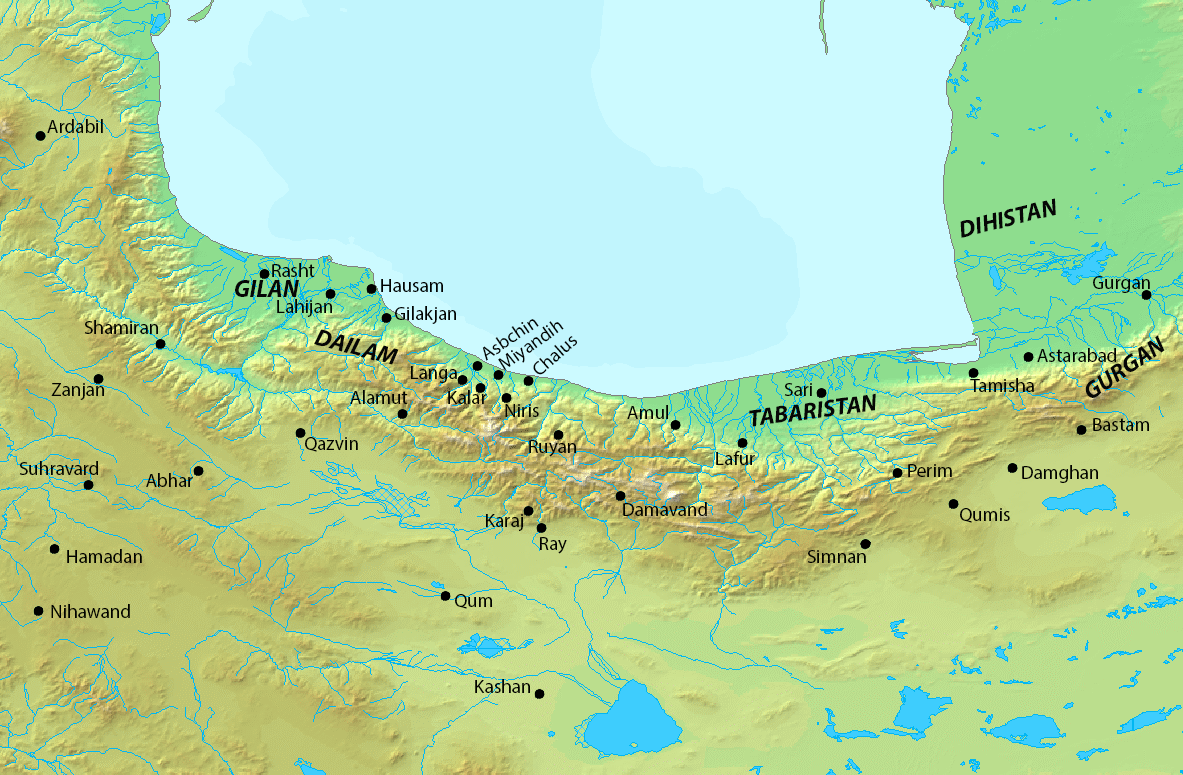
Map of northern Iran

Justan is first mentioned in 865, when he was placed on the Justanid throne by his suzerain, the Alid ruler Hasan ibn Zayd, who had deposed Justan's brother Khurshid because of his hostility towards the Alids. In 866/7, Justan fought against the Abbasid governor of Ray, 'Abd-Allah ibn 'Aziz. Justan eventually won, killing and capturing many inhabitants of the city. Justan later agreed to leave the city after having been paid 2,000,000 dirhams. In 869, the Abbasid military officer Muflih al-Turki invaded Tabaristan, and defeated Justan at the nearby city of Qazvin. Fortunately for the Alids, however, Muflih shortly left the region. In ca. 889, Justan aided the new Alid ruler Muhammad ibn Zayd against the ruler of Khorasan, Rafi ibn Harthama.

In 900, the Samanids, who had become the new masters of Khorasan, defeated the Alids at Gurgan and conquered their domains in Tabaristan. They also shortly managed to defeat Justan, but failed to conquer his territory. Some time later, Justan welcomed another Alid named Hasan al-Utrush, who had taken refugee at Ray after the Samanid conquest of Tabaristan.

Together, Justan and Hasan tried in 902 and 903 to recover control of Tabaristan, but without success. Worried by the fickleness of Justan, Hasan resolved to build a power base of his own. He therefore went on a mission to the as-yet unconverted Gilites and Dailamites to the north of the Alborz mountains, where he preached in person and founded mosques. His efforts were swiftly crowned by success: the mountain Daylamites and the Gilites east of the Safid Rud river recognized him as their imam with the name of al-Nāṣir li'l-Ḥaqq ("Defender of the True Faith") and were converted to his own branch of Zaydi Islam, which was named after him as the Nasiriyya and differed in some practices from the "mainstream" Qasimiyya branch adopted in Tabaristan following the teachings of Qasim ibn Ibrahim.

This development threatened the position of Justan, but in the ensuing showdown between the two Hasan was able to affirm his position and compel Justan to swear allegiance to himself. Justan was murdered in 919 by his brother Ali of Dailam, who became the new ruler of the Justanids. However, Justan's murder was shortly avenged by his son-in-law Muhammad ibn Musafir who had married his daughter Kharasuya and was from another Dailamite dynasty known as the Sallarids, which ruled over Tarum.

== Sources ==
- Madelung, W. (1975). "The Minor Dynasties of Northern Iran". In Frye, R. N. (ed.). The Cambridge History of Iran, Volume 4: From the Arab Invasion to the Saljuqs. Cambridge: Cambridge University Press. pp. 198–249. ISBN 978-0-521-20093-6.
- Bosworth, C. E. (2011). The Ornament of Histories: A History of the Eastern Islamic Lands AD 650-1041: The Persian Text of Abu Sa'id 'Abd Al-Hayy Gardizi. I.B.Tauris. pp. 1–169. ISBN 978-1-84885-353-9.
- Strothmann, R. (1986). "Ḥasan al-Uṭrūs̲h̲". The Encyclopedia of Islam, New Edition, Volume III: H–Iram. Leiden, and New York: BRILL. pp. 254–255. ISBN 90-04-08118-6.
- Pezeshk, Manouchehr (2009). "JOSTANIDS". Encyclopaedia Iranica, Vol. XV, Fasc. 1. pp. 44–46.
- Ibn Isfandiyar, Muhammad ibn al-Hasan (1905). An Abridged Translation of the History of Tabaristan, Compiled About A.H. 613 (A.D. 1216). Trans. Edward G. Browne. Leyden: E.J. Brill.

Preceded by Khurshid	Justanid king 865 - 919	Succeeded by Ali
