= Justine O'Brien =

Australian zoologist

Dr Justine O'Brien
- Education: University of Sydney
- Scientific career
- Fields: Zoology
- Workplaces: SeaWorld Parks & Entertainment
- Thesis: In vitro and in vivo developmental capacity of oocytes from prepuberal and adult sheep (1997)

Justine K. O'Brien, an Australian zoologist, is best known for her use of reproductive research to assist in wildlife management and conservation.

== Education ==
O'Brien obtained her Bachelor of Science in Agriculture from the University of Sydney in 1993 and her PhD from the University's Faculty of Veterinary Science in 1998. She completed postdoctoral fellowships at the Cincinnati Zoo and Taronga Zoo.

== Career ==
In 2003, O'Brien joined SeaWorld. In 2006 she co-supervised with Dr Todd Robeck the establishment of the SeaWorld & Busch Gardens Reproductive Research Center (SWBGRRC) in San Diego. O'Brien and her colleagues at the SWBGRRC and collaborating zoos have undertaken detailed study of the reproductive biology of numerous marine species, and have developed artificial insemination using fresh and frozen-thawed sperm in five species of marine animals: killer whale, bottlenose dolphin, Pacific white-sided dolphin, beluga and the Magellanic penguin, with over 50 offspring born to date. The center's primary activity of characterising a species' basic reproductive physiology is used not only to enhance natural breeding and to develop ART, but also is used to form a species-specific reproductive baseline database, which can be incorporated into population health assessments of ex situ and in situ wildlife.

O'Brien is co-chair of the Regulatory Subcommittee of the International Embryo Transfer Society's Parent Committee on Companion Animals Non-Domestic and Endangered Species (CANDES), and the Reproduction Co-advisor for the Association of Zoos and Aquariums (AZA) Rhino Research Advisory Group.

In 2018, O'Brien joined Taronga Conservation Society Australia as Manager, Conservation Science. In this role she manages a team of researchers supporting conservation science programs to increase the understanding and protection of wildlife.
