= Justanids =

Iranian Zaydi Shia dynasty

Justanids جستانیان
- 791–11th-century
- Capital: Rudbar
- Common languages: Persian; Deylami
- Religion: Zoroastrianism (791–805); Zaydi Islam (805–11th-century)
- Government: Monarchy
- King
  - 791–805: Justan I (first)
  - 972–1004: Khusrau Shah (last)
- Historical era: Middle Ages
  - Established: 791
  - Ismaili conquest: 11th-century
Preceded by	Succeeded by
Daylamites	Nizari Ismaili state

The Justanids or Jostanids (Persian: جستانیان) were an Iranian Zaydi Shia dynasty that ruled a part of Daylam (the mountainous district of Gilan) from 791 to the late 11th century.

== History ==
The Justanids appear as kings of Daylam at the end of the 8th century. Their centre was in the Rudbar of Alamut, running into the valley of the Shahrood. Two centuries later, this had become the main centre of the historical Nizari Ismailis or Assassins (Hashshashin), as they are known in the west. They appear in Islamic history as part of what Vladimir Minorsky has called "the Iranian Intermezzo". This refers to a period in which indigenous Daylamite and Kurdish principalities took power in northwest Persia after two to three centuries of Arab rule. The Daylamite upsurge eventually culminated in the Buyid dynasty.

After Marzuban ibn Justan converted to Islam in 805, the ancient family of Justans became connected to the Zaydi Alids of the Daylam region. The Justanids adopted the Zaydi form of Shi'ism. In the 10th century, they were eclipsed by the Daylamite dynasty of Sallarids in Tarom (modern Iranian province of Zanjan). Nevertheless, the Justanids were tied by marriage with the Sallarids and preserved their seat of Rudbar in the highlands of Daylam. They also became allies with the Buyids. In the 11th century, they may have recognized the suzerainty of the Ghaznavids. Later, they recognized the suzerainty of the Seljuqs, but, shortly after, they fade from history.

== Justanid rulers ==
- Justan I (791–805)
- Marzuban of Daylam (805–855)
- Justan II (855–856)
- Vahsudan of Daylam (856–865)
- Khurshid of Daylam (865)
- Justan III (865–919)
- Ali of Daylam (919)
- Khusrau Firuz (919)
- Siyahchashm (919–928)
- Justan IV (928–947)
- Manadhar (947–972)
- Khusrau Shah (972–1004)

== Family tree ==
Justan I r. 791–805
Marzuban r. 805–855
Justan II r. 855–856
Vahsudan r. 856–865
Justan III r. 865-919	Khusrau Firuz r. 919	Ali r. 919	Khurshid r. 865
Unknown	Kharasuya	Siyahchashm r. 919–928
Unnamed prince
Justan IV r. 928–947
Manadhar r. 947–972
Khusrau Shah r. 972–1004	Fuladh	Unnamed princess
Ibn Fuladh

== Sources ==
- Donohue, John J. (2003). The Buwayhid Dynasty in Iraq 334 H./945 to 403 H./1012: Shaping Institutions for the Future. Leiden and Boston: Brill. ISBN 90-04-12860-3.
- Madelung, W. (1975). "The Minor Dynasties of Northern Iran". In Frye, Richard N. (ed.). The Cambridge History of Iran. Vol. 4. Cambridge: Cambridge University Press. pp. 198–249. ISBN 0-521-20093-8.
- Madelung, W. (1992). Religious and ethnic movements in medieval Islam. Variorum. ISBN 0860783103.
- Clifford Edmund Bosworth, The New Islamic Dynasties: A Chronological and Genealogical Manual, Columbia University, 1996.
- Minorsky, Vladimir, Studies in Caucasian History. New York: Taylor's Foreign Press, 1953.
- Pezeshk, Manouchehr (2009). "JOSTANIDS". Encyclopaedia Iranica, Vol. XV, Fasc. 1. pp. 44–46.
