= Justina Gaspar =

Mozambican politician

Member of the People's Assembly
- In office 1977–1986

Personal details
- Died: 30 March 1986; Pemba, Mozambique

Justina Gaspar was a Mozambican politician. In 1977 she was one of the first group of women elected to the People's Assembly.

Gaspar was a FRELIMO candidate in the 1977 parliamentary elections, in which she was one of the first group of 27 women elected to the People's Assembly. She was killed on 30 March 1986 when an air force transport plane she was travelling in crashed during takeoff from an airport in Pemba airport.
