= Justine =

Justine may refer to:

- Justine (given name), a list of people with the name
- Justine (Durrell novel), the first book in The Alexandria Quartet by Lawrence Durrell
- Justine (de Sade novel) or The Misfortunes of Virtue, a 1791 novel by Marquis de Sade
- Justine (Thompson novel), a 1996 novel by Alice Thompson
- Cruel Passion, also titled Justine, a 1977 film starring Koo Stark and Glory Annen
- Justine (1969 film), directed by George Cukor and Joseph Strick, based on Durrell's novel
- Marquis de Sade: Justine, a 1969 film by Jesús Franco, based on de Sade's novel
- Justine (2020 film), a British romantic drama film
- "Justine", a song on Linda Ronstadt's 1980 album Mad Love
- Amnesia: Justine, a 2011 expansion story for the Amnesia: The Dark Descent video game

== See also ==
- Justina, including a list of people with the given name
