= Sallarid dynasty =

919–1062 Iranian Muslim dynasty in Azerbaijan

Sallarid dynasty سالاریان
- 919–1062
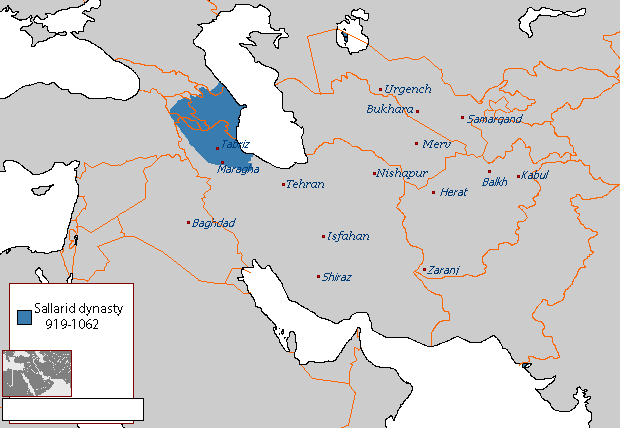
- Map of the Sallarid dynasty at its greatest extent
- Status: Monarchy
- Capital: Tarom
- Common languages: Persian, Daylami, Talysh
- Religion: Shia Islam
- King
  - 919–941: Muhammad bin Musafir (first)
  - 1050–1062(?): Musafir ibn Ibrahim II (last)
- Historical era: Middle Ages
  - Established: 919
  - Disestablished: 1062
Preceded by
Sajid dynasty
Succeeded by
Nizari Ismaili state
Shaddadids
Rawadid
- Today part of: Armenia; Azerbaijan; Iran

The Sallarid dynasty (Persian: سالاریان), (also known as the Musafirids or Langarids) was a Shia Muslim dynasty of Daylami origin, which ruled in Tarom, Samiran, Daylam, Gilan and subsequently Azerbaijan, Arran, and some districts in Eastern Armenia in the 2nd half of the 10th century. They constitute part of the period in history that has been named the Iranian Intermezzo, a period that saw the rise of native Iranian dynasties during the 9th to the 11th centuries.

== Early years ==
The Sallarids were Daylamites who, probably in the later 9th century, gained control of Shamiran, a mountain stronghold about twenty-five miles north of Zanjan. From Shamiran they established their rule over the surrounding region of Tarom. The Sallarids also established marriage ties with the neighboring Justanid dynasty of Rudbar.

=== Muhammad bin Musafir ===
In the early 10th century, the Sallarid in control of Shamiran was Muhammad bin Musafir. He married a Justanid and subsequently involved himself in their internal affairs. His harsh rule, however, eventually turned even his family against him, and in 941 he was imprisoned by his sons Wahsudan ibn Muhammad and Marzuban.

== Azerbaijan under the Sallarids ==
=== Marzuban ibn Muhammad ===
Wahsudan remained in Shamiran while Marzuban invaded Azerbaijan and took it from its ruler, Daisam. Marzuban took Dvin, ended the existence of the Sajid dynasty in 941 and founded the Sallarid dynasty, and successfully held off attacks from the Rus and Hamdanids of Mosul. However, he was captured in a war with the Buwayhid Rukn al-Daula and control of Azerbaijan was fought over between Muhammad bin Musafir, Wahsudan, the Buyids, and Daisam. He captured Ardabil and Tabriz, then extended his power to Barda, Derbent and also to North-Western regions of Azerbaijan. Shirvanshahs agreed to become Marzuban’s vassal and pay tribute. Eventually, Marzuban escaped and reestablished control over Azerbaijan and made peace with Rukn al-Daula, marrying off his daughter to him. He ruled until his death in 957.

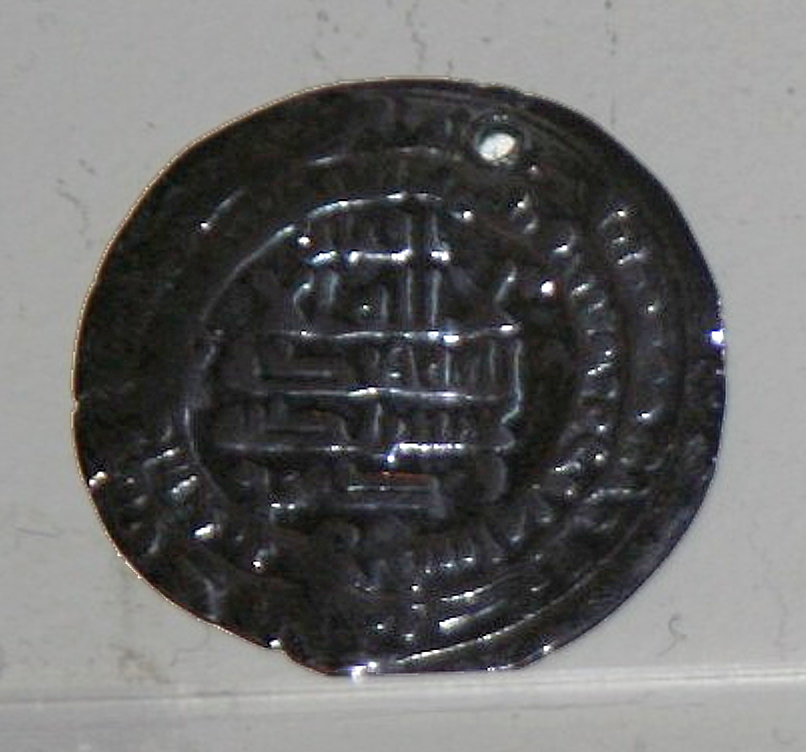
Silver dirham of Marzban bin Muhammad.

In 943-944, the Russians organized another campaign to the Caspian region, which was many times more brutal than the 913/14 March. As a result of this campaign, which affected the economic situation in the region, Barda lost its position and essence as a large city and gave this position to Ganja.

The Sallarid army was defeated several times. The Rus captured Barda, the capital of Arran. The Rus' allowed the local people to retain their religion in exchange for recognition of their overlordship; it is possible that the Rus' intended to settle permanently. According to ibn Miskawaih, the local people broke the peace by stone-throwing and other abuse directed against the Rus', who then demanded that the inhabitants evacuate the city. This ultimatum was rejected, and the Rus' began killing people and holding many for ransom. The slaughter was briefly interrupted for negotiations, which soon broke down. The Rus' stayed in Bardha'a for several months, using it as a base for plundering the adjacent areas and amassed substantial spoils.

The city was saved only by an outbreak of dysentery among the Rus'. Marzuban then laid siege to Barda, but received news that the Hamdanid amir of Mosul, Marzuban left a small force to keep the Rus in check, and in a winter campaign (945-946), defeated al-Husain. The Rus meanwhile decided to leave, taking as much loot and prisoners as they could.

In 948, Marzuban was defeated by Hamadan and the ruler of Isfahan, Rukn ed-Daula, and was taken prisoner at Samiram Castle. After that, the territory of Sallarids became the place of a ruthless struggle for power between Marzuban's brother Vahsudan, his sons, and Deysam Sajid. This momentary weakness in the central administration allowed the Rawadids and Shaddadids to take control of the areas to the northeast of Tabriz and Dvin, respectively.

=== Marzuban's successors ===
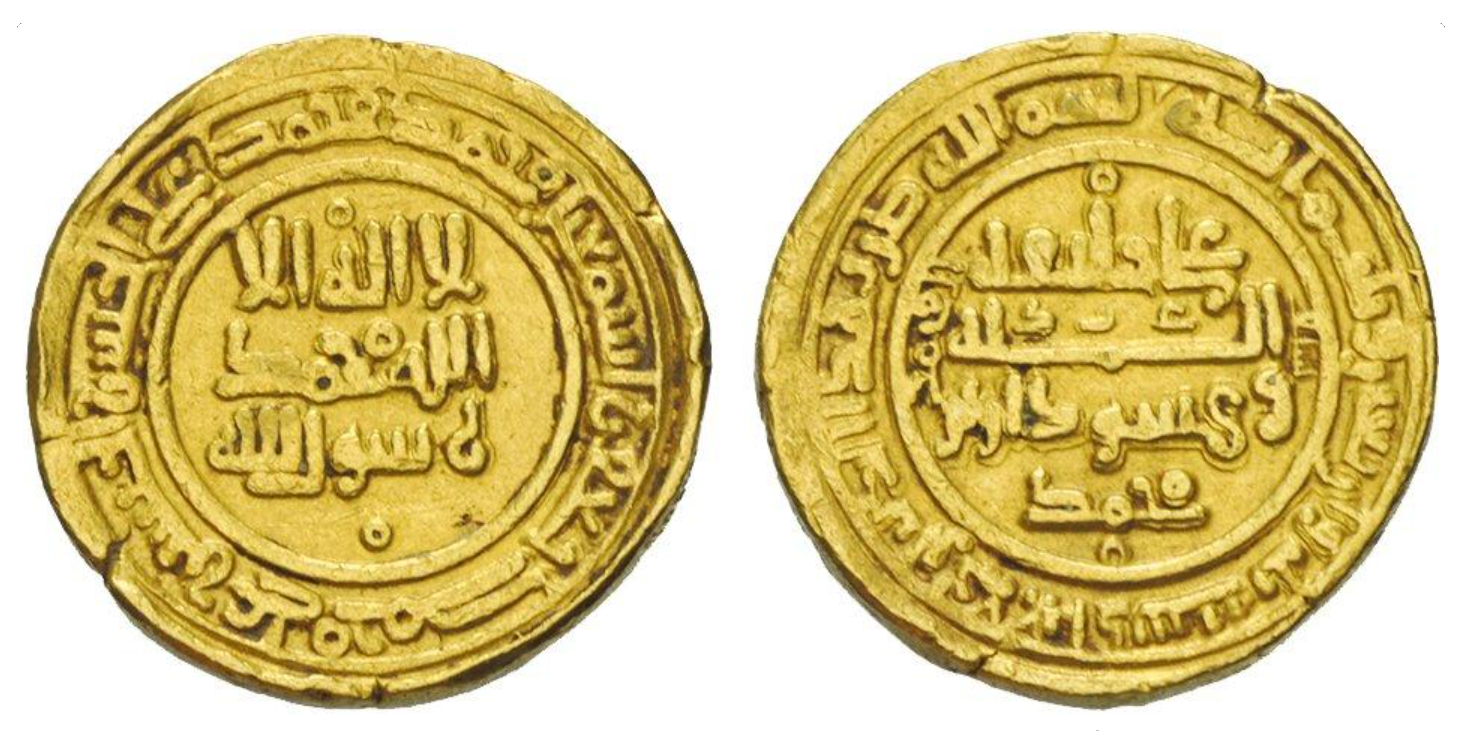
Coinage of Sallarid ruler Wahsudan ibn Muhammad, dated 954-5 CE

Marzuban had designated his brother Wahsudan as his successor. When he came to Azerbaijan, however, the commanders of the fortresses refused to surrender to him, recognizing instead Marzuban's son Justan I ibn Marzuban I as his successor. Unable to establish his rule in the province, Wahusdan returned to Tarum; Justan was recognized as ruler in Azerbaijan, with his brother Ibrahim I ibn Marzuban I made governor of Dvin. Justan seems to have been interested primarily in his harem, a fact which alienated some of his supporters, although he and Ibrahim successfully put down a revolt by al-Mustajir bi-llāh, grandson of the caliph al-Muktafi in 960.

Shortly afterward Justan and another brother, Nasir, came to Tarum, where they were treacherously imprisoned by Wahsudan, who sent his son Isma'il to take over Azerbaijan. Ibrahim raised an army in Armenia to oppose Isma'il, prompting Wahsudan to execute Justan, his mother and Nasir. Ibrahim was driven out of Azerbaijan by Isma'il, but retained his rule in Dvin.

Isma'il died in 962, however, allowing Ibrahim to occupy Azerbaijan. He then invaded Tarum and forced Wahsudan to flee to Dailaman. In 966 Ibrahim was defeated by an army of Wahsudan's and his soldiers subsequently deserted him. He fled to his brother-in-law, the Buyid Rukn al-Daula, while Wahsudan installed his son Nuh in Azerbaijan. Rukn al-Daula sent an army under his vizier to reinstate Ibrahim in Azerbaijan, and Wahsudan was ejected from Tarum for a time. In 967 however, he again sent an army, which burnt Ardabil before Ibrahim concluded a peace with his uncle, ceding part of Azerbaijan to him. In 968 he reaffirmed Sallarid authority over Shirvan, forcing the Shirvanshah to pay him tribute.

Ibrahim's authority began to decline in the latter part of his reign. In 971 the Shaddadids took Ganja, and Ibrahim was forced to recognize their rule in that city after a siege failed to dislodge them. In around 979 he was deposed and imprisoned; he died in 983. His deposition marked the end of the Sallarids as a major power in Azerbaijan, as the Rawadids of Tabriz overran much of the province. A grandson of Wahsudan named Marzuban b. Isma'il retained a small portion of Azerbaijan until 984 when he was captured by the Rawadids. His son Ibrahim fled to Tarum and would later restore Sallarid rule thereafter it was seized by the Buwayhids.

In Dvin, meanwhile, a son of Ibrahim b. Marzuban b. Muhammad, Abu'l-Hajja', held power; in 982 or 983 he was persuaded by the King of Kars to invade the domain of the Bagratid king Smbat II. Sometime after this Abu'l-Hajja' led an expedition against Abu Dulaf al-Shaibani, the ruler of Golthn and Nakhchivan, but was defeated and lost Dvin to him. He then traveled throughout Georgia and Armenia and visited the Byzantine emperor Basil II. In 989 or 990 Smbat II gave him an army to retake Dvin, but afterward revoked his support. Eventually Abu'l-Hajja' met his end at the hands of his servants, who strangled him.

== Tarum under the later Sallarids ==
After Wahsudan's death (sometime after 967), his son Nuh succeeded him in Shamiran. Nuh died before 989; in that year the Buwayhid Fakhr al-Daula married his widow and then divorced her, taking Shamiran in the process. Nuh's young son Justan was brought to Ray.

In 997, after Fakhr al-Daula died, Ibrahim b. Marzuban b. Isma'il took advantage of the weakness of his successor to seize control of Shamiran, Zanjan, Abhar, and Suharavard. When the Ghaznavid Mahmud of Ghazni conquered Ray in 1029 he sent a force to conquer Ibrahim's territories, but it failed to do so. Ibrahim took Qazvin from the Ghaznavids and defeated Mahmud's son Mas'ud in battle. Mas'ud managed to bribe some of Ibrahim's soldiers to capture him. Ibrahim's son refused to give up the fortress of Sarjahan but was compelled to pay tribute. By 1036 the Sallarids were back in Shamiran.

In around 1043 the Seljuk sultan Toghril Beg received the submission of the Salar of Tarum, who became his vassal and submitted tribute. This Sallarid may have been Justan b. Ibrahim, who was named the ruler of Tarum in 1046. In 1062 Toghril went to Shamiran and again received tribute from its ruler, Musafir. This is the last Sallarid who is known; it is likely that the dynasty was shortly afterward wiped out by the Assassins of Alamut, who dismantled the fortress of Shamiran. Latterly, the dynasty was assimilated by Seljuk Turks.

== See also ==
- History of Azerbaijan
- History of Iran
- Iranian Intermezzo
- Iran
