= The Forgotten Kings =

Non-fiction account by Ahmad Kasravi

- Author: Ahmad Kasravi
- Language: English, Persian
- Genre: Non-fiction, history
- Publisher: Negah Publications
- Publication date: Original date:1929 – Translation version:2009
- Publication place: Imperial State of Iran
- Pages: 348
- ISBN: 978-964-351-318-4

The Forgotten Kings (Note: Persian: شهریاران گمنام, romanized: Shahriyârân-e Gomnâm) is a chronicle account by Ahmad Kasravi. it is wrote since late 1928 to 1929, which includes documentary research on several At that time unknown and anonymous post-Islamic to pre-Seljuk Empire Iranian dynasties.

Kasravi believes that the reason why these dynasties remain unknown until now is illiteracy and neglect of Iranian history reading and the destruction of documents by dynasties such as the Safavids. Kasravi has used handwritten sources such as Abu'l-Hasan Isfaraini, Ibn Khordadbeh, Hafiz-i Abru and Al-Tabari in writing this book. Although more than half a century has passed since the book was written, it is still recognized as one of the academic resources in the field of source. Kasravi believes that contrary to the opinion of most historians, the 3rd and 4th centuries in Iran are not clear at all and there are not enough resources to advance research in this field. He also believes that over 150 families after the fall of the Sassanids to the end of the Qajar period feudally Species ruled in the regions of Iran.

== Writing style and Sources ==
Kasravi used more than 33 general sources written by prominent historians and tourists such as Ibn Khordadbeh, and 9 local sources used by unknown or less prominent historians to write The Forgotten Kings. This research has three parts: 1-Daylamites, 2-Rawadid and 3-Shaddadids. Of these three sections, Daylamites have relatively more reliable sources, and for this reason Kasravi has written more about them. Kasravi also studied the works of Seljuk historians such as Jami 'al-tawarikh, and parts of his book were written from these sources. But he and the authors who wrote articles on the book believe that his most important and authoritative source is History of the Prophets and Kings.

Kasravi's special way of writing and his insistence on writing in Persian and avoiding Arabic loanwords have in some cases made the text unfamiliar and difficult. For example, in the way of expressing the past continuous, his method is abandoned and unfamiliar, however, the book can be used for academic groups. The main method of the author in writing this book is the method of narrative blur, but at the same time, he has sometimes analyzed the events. The author's reliance on handwritten sources, especially about the Shaddadids dynasty, has given a special feature to some of the contents of the book, which is highly credible in terms of authenticity and contains minor and significant points in terms of content.

Kasravi, considering his stances against Islam, has tried to have an impartial and impartial view that makes the book a reference in terms of neutrality. Another noteworthy point about this book is that the author did not limit his book to the expression of political history and provided useful and relatively abundant information about the social and cultural life of the Iranian society at that time and the impact of the mentioned dynasties on their lives.

== Summary ==
=== Part I ===
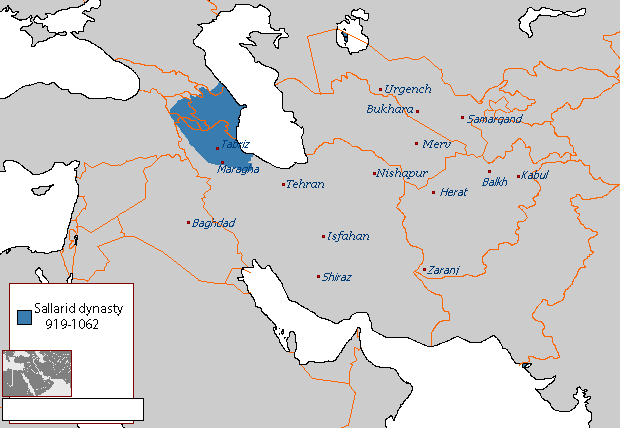
The realm of Sallarid dynasty

The Forgotten Kings consists of three parts and deals with the historical period of the first century of Islam in Iran. The first part of the book is about three dynasties that came to power in Daylam or Gilan region, Justanids, Kankarids and Sallarids. Kasravi believes that from the Sassanid period to the fourteenth century AD, Daylam or Daylamistan was the name of a region that is now called Gilan. Referring to the history of Gilan by Zahir al-Din Mar'ashi, he believes that the Zaydians replaced the name of Gilan with Daylmestan by massacring Daylamites. Kasravi then spoke about several reference books such as Mu'jam al-Buldān by Yaqut al-Hamawi and Vis and Ramin by Fakhruddin As'ad Gurgani, about the bravery and warfare of the people of Daylam and believes that they never made peace with Muslim Arabs and even fought with them.

Citing History of the Prophets and Kings, Kasravi points out that the reason for the Daylamites' support for the Alawites was not Zaidiyyah, but because of maintaining Iran's independence. The Alawites considered the caliphate their right and opposed the Abbasids. The Daylamites, who were hostile to the Abbasids, supported the Alawites and gradually became Muslims. After an introduction to the history of Daylamites, Kasravi refers to the Justanid dynasty who ruled in the modern-day city of Rudbar and he mention name seven kings of them. Kasravi stated the reason for the fall of this dynasty as three reasons: 1- The emergence of Islam in Daylam 2- Dynastic disputes and conflicts 3- The emergence of the Kankarid dynasty. Kankarids were a branch of Sallarid dynasty, they ruled in Abhar, Zangan and Suhraward, and their religion was all Zaidi Islam. All the Kankars used the title Sallar to name themselves, like Ebrahim Sallar Kankari. During one of his travels, the famous Iranian poet Nasir Khusraw crossed the Kankarids realm and wrote that the Kankar kings were among the best rulers of their time and flourished Daylam very justly. Kasravi quotes Yaqut al-Hamawi: "The fall of the Kankarids took place at the hands of the Zandaqas of Alamut (Ismailis)." Sallarids were a dynasty that arrived in Adharbayjan, Arran and Armenia from the early 9th century. After the murder of Yusuf ibn Abi'l-Saj, the ruler appointed by the Abbasid caliph, a Kurdish general named Daysam took power in Adharbayjan, and his sons continued conquest. Kasravi mentions the uprising of Ishaq ibn Isa ibn al-Muktafi in 960 and cites Tajārib al-Umam as his source. Ishaq, son of Caliph al-Muktafi, called himself as al-Mustajir bi-llāh, marched there to eliminate the Zaydis and spread Sunni Islam in Daylam. At this time, from Justanids, Manadhar, allied with Justan Sallar Kankari and fought against al-Mustajir bi-llāh. He and his accomplices were eventually arrested and executed.

=== Part II ===
The second part is about Rawadids, that ruled in Adharbayjan. Kasravi first in an introduction to explanation how Arabs migrated to Azerbaijan:

It is certain during the Sassanid period and there is evidence that a tribe of Arabs lived in the hot regions of Iran such as Bahrain, Kerman and Khuzestan. One of these tribes was the Banu al-'Um, which was perhaps the first Arab tribe to migrate into Iran.

— Ahmad Kasravi, The Forgotten Kings, p. 120

Kasravi further spoke about the prevention of Sassanid emperors, including Shapur II, from the entry of Arabs into Iran, and attributed the reason for the frequent Arab invasion of Adharbayjan to two factors: 1- Because in the mountains around Adharbayjan, there were many warlike and brave people who were considered to be against the Arabs, so the Arabs had to constantly settle large groups of tribes in Adharbayjan. 2- Adharbayjan is one of the best regions of Iran and a land that is cold on one side and tropical on the other due to its date and greenery.

This introduction was to explain the presence of Arab tribes in Adharbayjan and how some of the rulers of Adharbayjan were of Arab descent. Kasravi divides Rawadians into two parts: 1- The Arab Rawadids 2- The Kurdish Rawadids. He explains the reason for the similarity of the two families as follows: At the end of the tenth century, there were two families in Adharbayjan, the Azdi Rawadi dynasty, who were of Arab descent, and the Muhammad ibn Shaddad dynasty, who were of Kurdish descent and ruled Arran and Armenia. Kasravi mentions four emirs in the section of Arab Rawadids and also writes the names of the families involved with the Arab Rawadids, which are Narandids, Urmians (from the Afshar tribe of Urmia) and Narizids. Kasravi considers the most important event of the Arab Rawadids during the migration of Oghuzs or Jewish Turkmens to Adharbayjan during the rule of Vahsudan; Oghuz invasion of Tabaristan and war with Armenians; The arrival of the second group of Oghuzs in Adharbayjan in 941, followed by the arrival of the third and fourth groups and then the arrival of Tughril in Adharbayjan. with Tughral Bey in Adharbayjan, Vahsudan surrendered to him.

Kasravi mentions a dynasty called Ahmadilis in 1107 who were the Atabaks of Maragheh and speculates that they were the remnants of Arab Rawadids. He writes the names of seven kings of this dynasty and while reciting a poem by Nezami Ganjavi in praise of Ala-al-Din Korpe Arslan, the fifth ruler of Ahmadilis, he believes that Haft Peykar by Nezami Ganjavi was written in praise of him. The last of Ahmadilis was Sulafa Khatun, granddaughter of Ala-al-Din, Ibn Athir mentioned her as the last Atabak of Maragheh. According to Shahabuddin Zeidari Nesavi, she married Jalal al-Din Mangburni and with this marriage Maragheh came under the control of Khwarazmian dynasty.

=== Part III ===
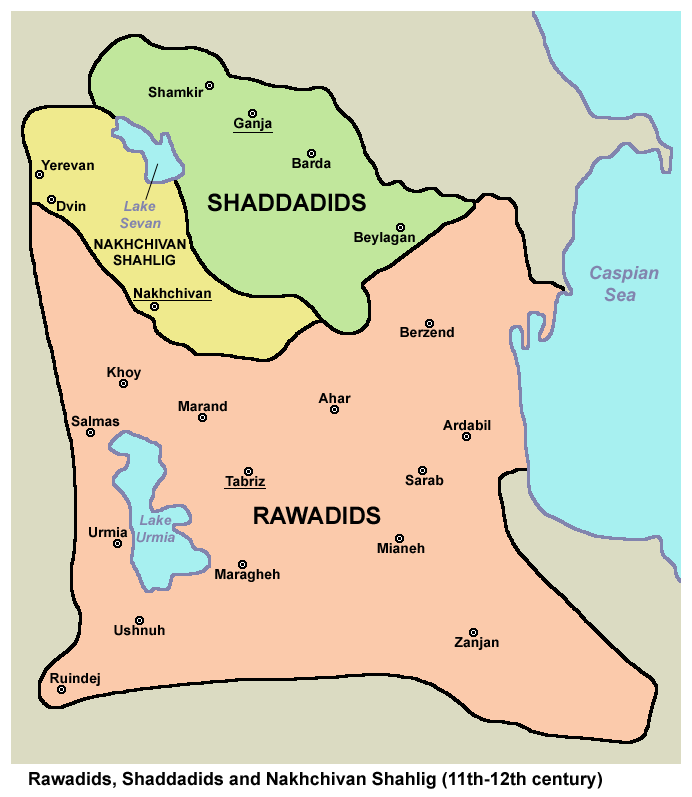
Rawandids and Shaddadids

The third part of the book, which is also the last part, is about Shaddadids dynasty. Kasravi in the introduction divides this family into two parts, 1- Shaddadids who ruled in Ganja. 2- Shaddadids who ruled in Ani and Armenia. Introduction The third part is dedicated to introducing the geographical and historical location of Arran until the conquest of Iran by the Arabs. Arran is located in the north of Iran and in the west of the Caspian Sea, and the big cities there are Baku, Ganja, Shamakhi and Derbent, and among the old cities there, Barda is the most important, whose ruins now remain. Regarding the history of Arran, Kasravi introduces its local there as "Arranshahs" and declares that they were a Tributary state of the Sassanids. He wrote that after the escape of Mehran, one of Anushirvan's relatives to Arran, 30,000 Iranian families joined him until one of the members of Anushirvan's relatives (that later formed Mihranids) named Varaz Gregor, who had converted to Christianity, overthrew the Arranshahs family. And during the help of Yazdgerd III, he sent his son named Javanshir to help of the Sassanid army. But after the death of Yazdgar III, Javanshir returned to Aran and after the Arabs entered Arran, Javanshir obeyed them.

After introduction, Shaddadids part began. They are called the Kurdish Ravandians, and he first wrote of their first branch, the Shaddadids of Ganja, who had eleven kings and the most famous of whom, Abu'l-Aswar Shavur ibn Fadl, eighth king who ruled for Forty Five Years. Then he talks about Shaddadids of Ani and Armenia. The rule of the Shaddadids in Ani began when Ani region Was conquered by Byzantine Empire; following the campaigns of Alp Arslan and the complicity of Abu'l-Aswar, Ani added to Seljuk realm. Alp Arslan gave Ani to Abu'l-Aswar's son, Manuchihr ibn Shavur. Manuchihr and his descendants ruled for one hundred and thirty years in Ani. Kasravi describes Manuchihr's struggles with the Turks and ends the third part with a story. He narrates the story of Manuchihr's justice and benevolence, citing Havakumn Patmutsyun by Vardan Areveltsi.

== Importance and value ==
The Forgotten Kings met with public acclaim after its publication and over the years became one of Ahmad Kasravi's valuable research. By studying many manuscripts and printed books, he was able to write one of the most enduring historical researches. What makes the book even more so is the author's indescribable effort in critique and assessing the accuracy of the material being studied. In comparing the adaptation of the documents, he pays attention to the evaluation of the documents from the point of view of "wisdom" and therefore the anonymous kings, unlike most of the available writings, gain a place as one of the academic works.

The Forgotten Kings is a book worthy of consideration in terms of observing the rules of research method and the novelty of the material, as well as being documented and accurate in references and logical sequence and the desired coherence in the text, as well as fluency of translation. with More than half a century after the book was written, the method of referring the book is far from what is different in today's scientific environments. However, in terms of referencing and documenting, reading and introducing the book is recommended by professors.
