= 1840 in Iran =

- Decades
- See also: Other events of 1840; Years in Iran

The following lists events that happened during 1840 in Qajar era.

== Incumbents ==
- Monarch: Mohammad Shah Qajar

== Births ==
- October 17 – Mirza Nasrullah Khan, first Iranian Prime Minister.
- ? – Abdallah Mazandarani, Iranian Shia Marja' and politician.
- ? – Amina Aqdas, Persian royal consort.
- ? – Seyyed Abdollah Behbahani, Persian Shi'a theologian.
- ? – Zeyn al-Abedin Maraghei, Persian novelist.
