= Imamzadeh Chaharmanar =

Historic former mausoleum in Tabriz, Iran

- امامزاده علی بن مجاهد
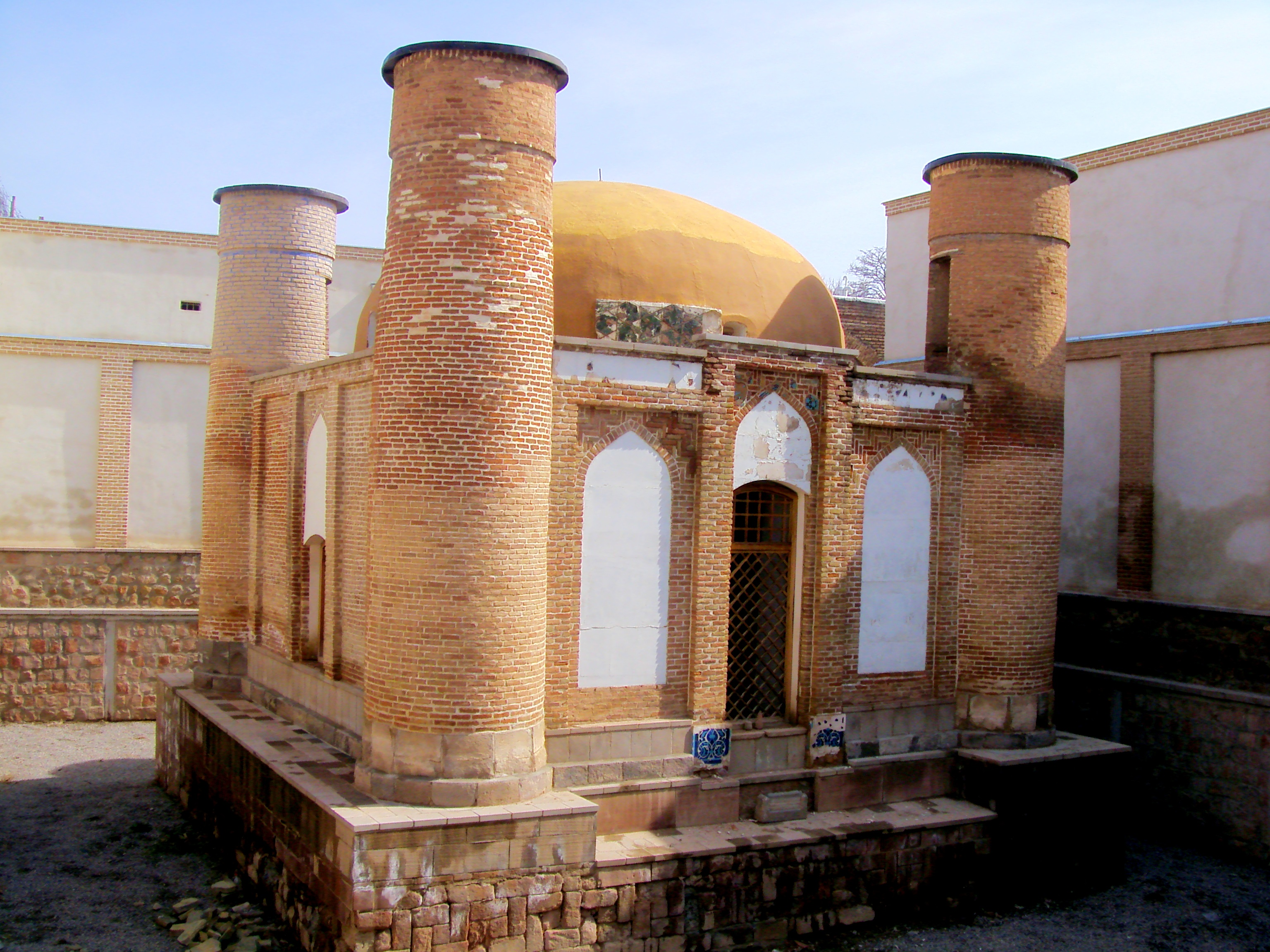

- Location of the complex in Iran

Religion
- Affiliation: Shia (Twelver) (former)
- Ecclesiastical or organizational status: Imamzadeh and mausoleum
- Status: Closed (since 1965)

Location
- Location: Tabriz, East Azerbaijan province
- Country: Iran
- Interactive map of Imamzadeh Chaharmanar
- Coordinates: 38°04′54″N 46°17′29″E

Architecture
- Type: Islamic architecture
- Style: Seljuk
- Completed: Seljuk era; 1863 CE (renovations)

Specifications
- Length: c.6 m (20 ft)
- Dome: 1
- Minaret: 4
- Materials: Bricks

Iran National Heritage List
- Official name: Imamzadeh Chaharmanar
- Type: Built
- Conservation organization: Cultural Heritage, Handicrafts and Tourism Organization of Iran

The Imamzadeh Chaharmanar (Persian: امامزاده علی بن مجاهد), also known locally as Imamzadeh Ali ibn Mujaheed, is a former Twelver Shi'ite imamzadeh and mausoleum complex, located in Tabriz, Iran. It was built during the Seljuk era. The complex was added to the Iran National Heritage List and is administered by the Cultural Heritage, Handicrafts and Tourism Organization of Iran.

The mausoleum contains the tomb of Ali ibn Mujaheed, a descendant of the fourth Ahl al-Bayt Imam, Ali al-Sajjad, as well as two of the rulers of the Rawadid dynasty. The mausoleum is located next to the historic Gharabaghi Mosque, but unlike the mosque, it has been closed since 1965.

== Etymology ==
The name "Chaharmanar" means "four minarets" in Persian. This is because the mausoleum has four identical minarets on each of its corners.

== History ==
An inscription on the building gives the first construction to a time during the Seljuk era. In the 11th century, the Rawadid ruler Abu'l-Hayja Mamlan I and his son, Abu Mansur Wahsudan were buried in the mausoleum. The mausoleum also survived the 1721 Tabriz earthquake.

In the year 1863, major repairs were done, by the order of Qajar princess, Zia ol-Saltaneh, daughter of Fath-Ali Shah Qajar.

=== Modern history ===
The mausoleum has been locked ever since it was shut down in 1965. Residents of Tabriz complained about the neglect of the mausoleum, and how the Gharabaghi Mosque next to it received renovations and was active in contrast to the mausoleum. In 1975, the government did issue a statement expressing interest in restoring it, but not much had been done. It was not reopened for public access either.

== Architecture ==
The mausoleum is a square building made out of brick which has a large dome and four raised minarets, one in each corner. The mausoleum is entered through a door on its southern side. Inside the mausoleum, on the western side, there is an opening in the floor that leads into a basement and cellar. Inside the cellar is the tomb of Ali ibn Mujaheed, and it has a meshed wooden zarih enclosing it.

== Burials ==
- Ali ibn Mujaheed - a descendant of the fourth Imam, Ali ibn Husayn Zayn al-Abidin

=== Rawadid rulers ===
- Abu'l-Hayja Mamlan I - Third amir of the Rawadid dynasty
- Abu Mansur Wahsudan - son of Abu'l-Hayja Mamlan I and the fourth amir of the Rawadid dynasty

=== Shi'ite clerics ===
- Seyed Abolfazl Mousavi Tabrizi
- Hujjat as-Salaam Safavi

== See also ==
- List of Imamzadeh
- List of mausoleums in Iran
- Shia Islam in Iran
