= Abu Nasr Mamlan II =

Amir of Azerbaijan from the Kurdish Rawadid dynasty (11th century AD)

- Amir
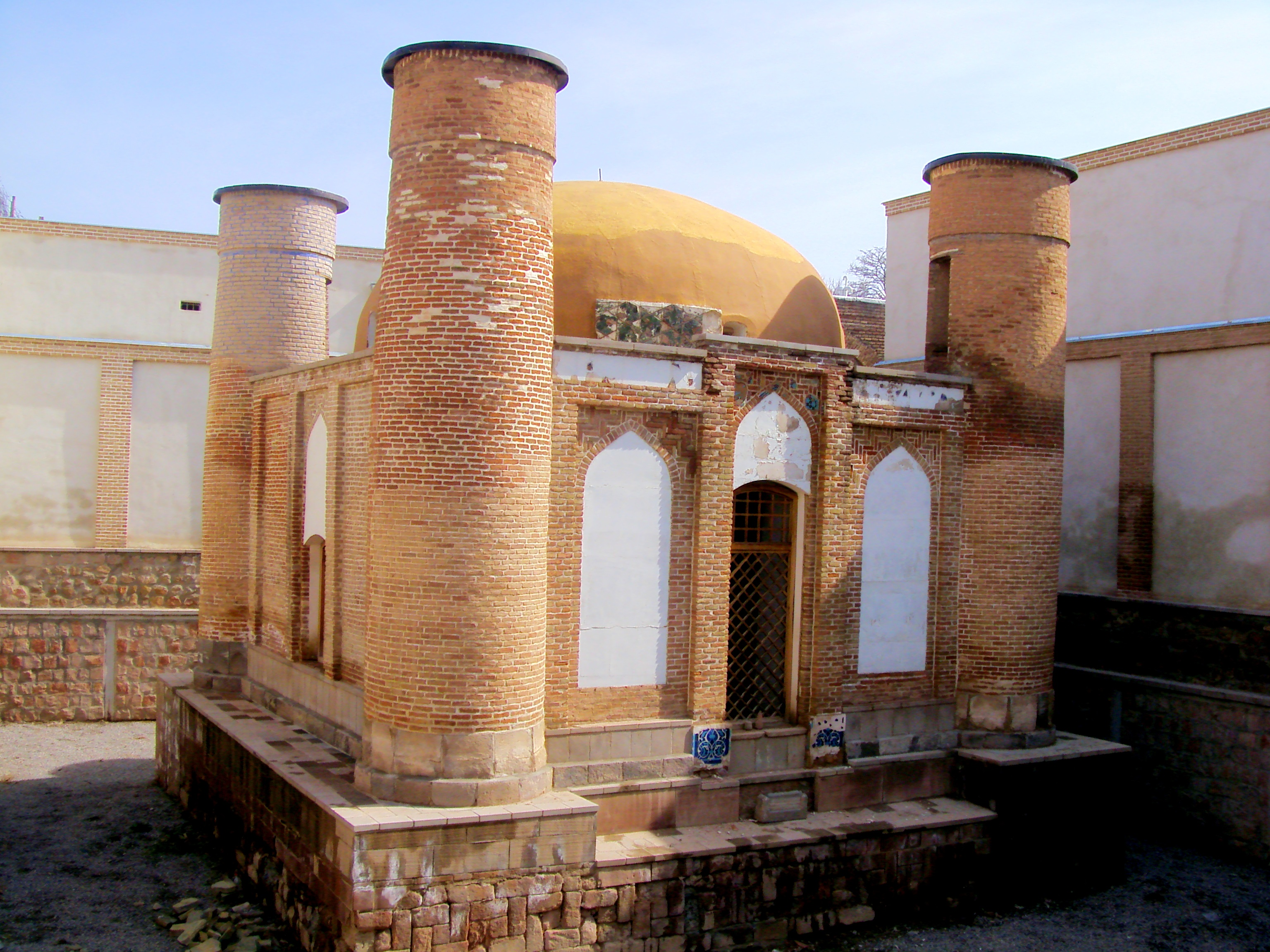
- The Imamzadeh Chaharmenar in Tabriz, where the Rawadid rulers are buried

Ruler of Azarbaijan
- Reign: 1058/9–1070
- Predecessor: Abu Mansur Wahsudan
- Successor: Alp Arslan (Seljuk Empire)
- Dynasty: Rawadids
- Father: Abu Mansur Wahsudan

Abu Nasr Mamlan II (also spelled Muhammad II) was the last Rawadid amir (ruler) of Azarbaijan from 1058/9 to 1071. He was the son and successor of Abu Mansur Wahsudan (r. 1019–1058/9). He was along with his sons arrested in 1070 by his suzerain, the Seljuk ruler Alp Arslan (r. 1063–1072), thus marking the end of the Rawadid dynasty. However, their descendants, the Ahmadilis, recaptured Maragha in the early 12th-century.

The Rawwadids were promoters of Persian culture, which is demonstrated by Mamlan II and his father's patronage of the Persian poet Qatran Tabrizi. Mamlan II himself seems to have been a poet, yet no traces of his work has survived.

== Sources ==
- Bosworth, C.E. (1996). The New Islamic Dynasties: A Chronological and Genealogical Manual. New York City: Columbia University Press. ISBN 0-231-10714-5.
- Dehghan, I. (1978). "Ḳaṭrān". In van Donzel, E.; Lewis, B.; Pellat, Ch. & Bosworth, C. E. (eds.). The Encyclopaedia of Islam, Second Edition. Volume IV: Iran–Kha. Leiden: E. J. Brill. OCLC 758278456.
- Madelung, Wilferd (1975). "Minor dynasties of northern Iran". In Frye, Richard N. (ed.). The Cambridge History of Iran. Vol. 4. Cambridge: Cambridge University Press. pp. 198–250. ISBN 0-521-20093-8.
- Peacock, Andrew (2017). "Rawwadids". Encyclopædia Iranica, online edition. New York.
- Rypka, Jan (1968). History of Iranian Literature. Springer Netherlands. ISBN 978-9401034814.
