= Rawwad ibn Muthanna =

Abbasid governor and ancestor of the Rawwadids

Rawwad ibn al-Muthanna al-Azdi (also spelled Rawwad Mussana, Arabic: رَوَّاد بن المُثَنَّى الأزدي) was an Azdi Arab military leader and governor in the 8th century under the Abbasid Caliphate. He was known for his role in the conquest and subsequent governance of the Iranian region of Azerbaijan.

At the start of the Abbasid period, Rawwad ibn Muthanna held a fief that included the city of Tabriz. He is believed to have lived during the reign of the Abbasid caliph Abu Ja'far al-Mansur (754—775). During this time, Yazid ibn Hatim al-Muhallabi, the Abbasid governor of Azerbaijan, relocated Yemeni tribesmen from Basra to Azerbaijan. Among these tribesmen, Rawwad settled near Tabriz and gained control over lands as far as the town of Bad (modern Qarajadaq), northeast of Ahar.

Baladuri and Ibn al-Faqih credit Rawwad and his son Wajna with the construction work in Tabriz, including its fortifications. Abbasid 13th century calligrapher Yaqut al-Musta'simi also mentions the building efforts in Tabriz, but incorrectly links Rawwad to the time of al-Mutawakkil, likely due to the fact that some of the city's structures were also attributed to that Abbasid caliph.

Rawwad ibn al-Muthanna al-Azdi is considered the progenitor of the Rawwadid dynasty. After taking control of a fief that included Tabriz at the start of the Abbasid period, he established a strong presence in the region.
