= Parcham (magazine) =

Political magazine in Iran (1942–1944)

- Categories: Political magazine
- Frequency: Biweekly
- Founder: Ahmad Kasravi
- Founded: 1942
- Final issue: 1944
- Country: Pahlavi Iran
- Based in: Tehran
- Language: Persian

Parcham (Persian: Flag) was a political magazine that was published in Pahlavi Iran by social and religious critic and historian Ahmad Kasravi in the period 1942–1944. Stanisław Adam Jaśkowski argues that Parcham contained Kasravi's writings which laid the basis of his religious ideas.

== History and profile ==
Parcham was launched by Ahmad Kasravi in 1942. It succeeded his previous publication Payman. Parcham was published in Tehran on a biweekly basis. It was the official organ of the political party, Azadegan, which was also established by Kasravi. Parcham folded in 1944.

== Contributors and content ==
Ali-Akbar Hakamizadeh published articles in Parcham criticizing Shiʿism. One of them was a 36-page article entitled Secrets of a Thousand Years. Due to these articles Ruhollah Khomeini called for the murder of Kasravi who would be assassinated by the radicals on the steps of a courthouse in Tehran in 1946. Khomeini also published a book in 1943 entitled Kashf-i asrar (Persian: The Unveiling of Secrets) to respond these claims.

== Legacy ==
The Chicago Persian Microfilms Project initiated by the University of Chicago in 1985 archived the issues of Parcham. Stanisław Adam Jaśkowski published a book in 2017 about Parcham entitled Parcham – Journal of Ahmad Kasravi and His Followers: A Snapshot from the History of Press in Iran.
