= Azari or the Ancient Language of Azerbaijan =

Book by Ahmad Kasravi

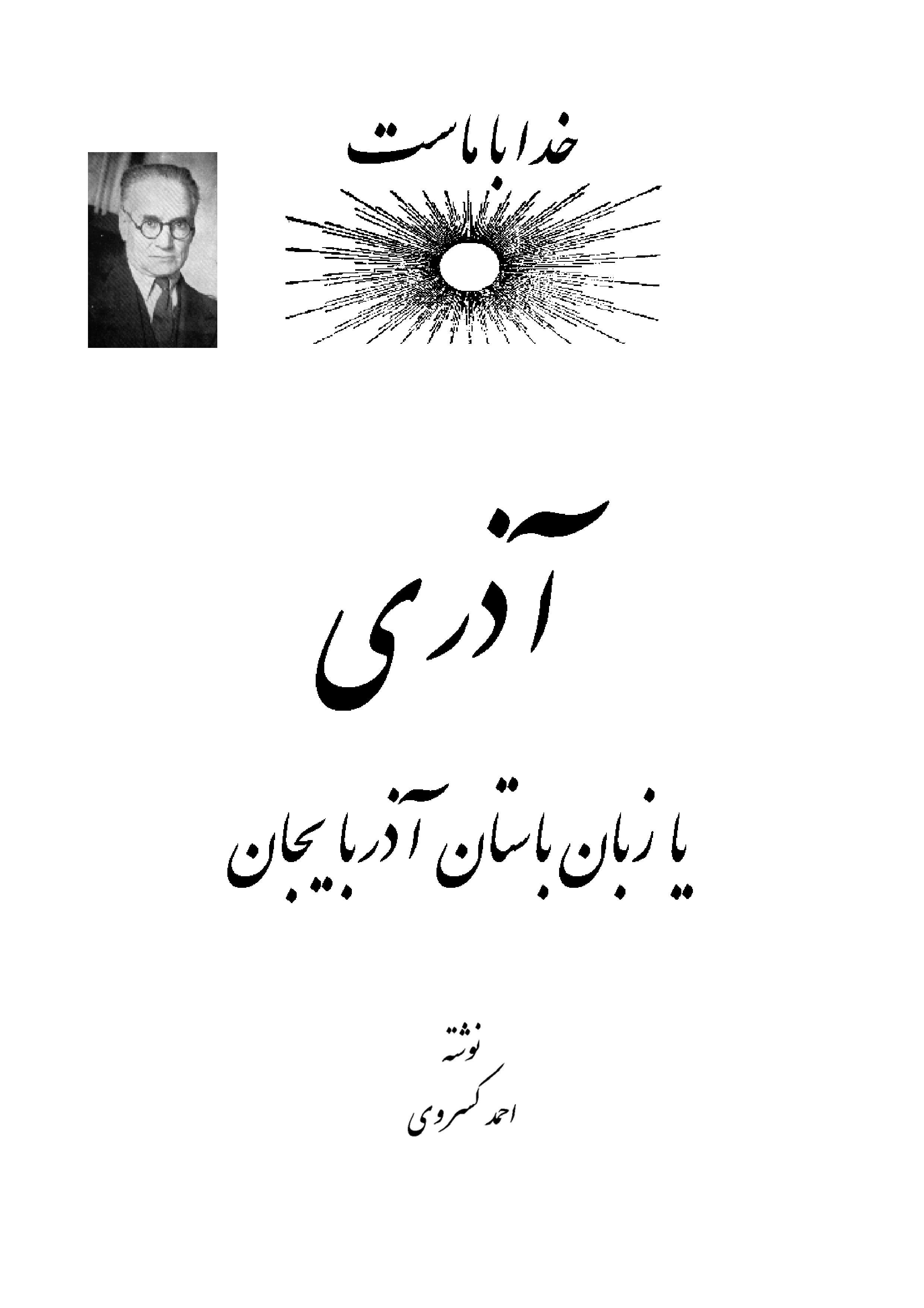
- Author: Ahmad Kasravi
- Language: Persian
- Genre: Non-fiction, history
- Published: 1925
- Publication place: Iran
- Preceded by: Zabân-e Pâk
- Followed by: Uprising of Sheikh Mohammad Khiabani

Azari or the Ancient Language of Azerbaijan (Note: Persian: آذری یا زبان باستان آذربایجان, romanized: Âzari yâ Zabân-e Bâstân-e Âzarbâyjân) is a treatise written by the Iranian scholar Ahmad Kasravi in 1925, about the history of Old Azeri. This book has been approved by orientalists. In this book, Kasravi, using numerous documents and manuscripts, argues that the Old Azeri language should not be categorized as a member of the Turkic languages, but as an Iranian language, a descendant of the Median language.

This treatise, which was Kasravi's first serious work, was very influential worldwide and led to a new theory in Iran about the existence of Iranian roots in the Azeri language.

In the words of the Encyclopædia Iranica:

This book enjoyed worldwide scholarly success. The publication of this work can also be considered an affirmation of the indestructible bond of Turkophone Iranians to Iran. Investigating the linguistic relationship of the Iranians of the past was just as much an assertion of their linguistic unity in the future as a means of demonstrating that every Iranian rejoiced in the same, continuous identity.

== Concept ==
Kasravi's motivation for writing the work was political. He published the work in a period of raging controversy among papers based in Iran, Istanbul (i.e. Turkey) and Baku (i.e. Azerbaijan SSR) on the Origin of the Azerbaijanis. Kasravi, after studying both arguments, concluded that the claims of the Turkish journalists were unfounded and non-academic, and the replies of the Iranian journalists were not "founded in a knowledge of history".

In this book, Kasravi first proposed the theory that the language of the region of Azerbaijan in northwestern Iran was a language of the Iranian language family a few centuries prior to the Turkic domination in this region. According to historical evidence, he named this language Azeri. This book made Kasravi famous in Iranian studies circles and he became a member of scientific circles abroad. The first edition of the book, and consequently the processing of theory, was based only on historical contexts. Later, Kasravi studied linguistics and in later editions of the book, he also dealt with this theory according to its linguistic foundations.

Kasravi's research motivated researchers to search for the remains of that historical language in different parts of Azerbaijan and find other examples of this language. Iranica adds:

This book was to echo resoundingly among scholars. Nonetheless, it has not been uncontroversial since. Quite aside from the scientific interest of the work, on the political level its publication could be considered an assertion of the irrevocable commitment of Turkish speakers within Iran to Iran. The enthusiastic reception of this book by the intelligentsia of the period clearly shows how any discussion that in any way questioned national unity had galled them. This unity was, theoretically, based in the linguistic unity of all Iranians. If this unity was called into question by reality, it was necessary to search the past to justify its realization in the present. This is how Kasravi contributed to a historiography of national import with the mission of bolstering the ongoing, highly dynamic process of identity construction

Kasravi's historical monuments have been recognized by other scholars. Vladimir Minorsky says about Kasravi: "Kasravi has the spirit of an honest historian. He is meticulous in detail and in presentation"

== Legacy ==
The treatise Azari or the Ancient Language of Azerbaijan started a new wave in historiography and linguistics in Iran. Since the publication of this treatise, various researches based on this book have been done for the etymology of Azeri language. Later, foreign and Iranian professors, linguists, and orientalists wrote articles in support of the Azeri treatise.
