= Zabân-e Pâk =

1944 Persian treatise by Ahmad Kasravi

- Author: Ahmad Kasravi
- Language: Persian
- Publication date: 1944
- Publication place: Iran
- Pages: 56

Zabân-e Pâk (Persian: زبان پاک, lit. 'Pure language') is a treatise written in 1944 by Ahmad Kasravi, an Iranian author, contains an edition of the Persian language, which shows some difficulties in refining the language.

Kasravi saw one of the steps in the progress of Iran and achieving a democratic society as reforming the Persian language. Zabân-e Pâk was one of the first works that sought to suggest refinements of Persian. Kasravi found dead words of Middle Persian and preferred their use over Arabic loanwords. The movement that Kasravi started, today known as Sareh Persian, tries to use original Iranian words.

== Background ==
Kasravi conducted extensive research in his previous book, Azari or the Ancient Language of Azerbaijan, to prove that today's Azeri language has Persian roots. As a child, in addition to Azeri, he also learned Arabic and Persian. As he himself published articles in Arabic newspapers and books in that language were distributed in Egypt. He also wrote the first knowledge books for teaching this language with his linguistic knowledge, including the two books al-Durrah al-Thamina and Kholasat al-Nahv.

His other books include al-Tashi'e va al-Shī'ah in Arabic. He also published the first articles on Esperanto in Arabic magazines. Kasravi taught Arabic at the American Memorial School, where he also learned English well. Learning English helped him use books in that language and other European languages.

== Concepts ==
The initial idea of reforming Persian arose after Kasravi became acquainted with the universal language of Esperanto. Inspired by the principles of lexicography and grammar of Esperanto, he made what he saw as corrections and refinements to the Persian language. Kasravi says in this regard:

"If you have heard that Dr. Zamenhof has created a language called Esperanto from the rules of knowledge, the ease of which is amazing, we should follow the same rules in adorning the Persian language and make this language very easy."

Kasravi saw two ways to improve the Persian language:

1. Changing the Perso-Arabic script to Latin
2. Removing loanwords in the Persian language and replacing them with words derived from Persian roots.

In Kasravi's time, Arabic idioms and words were used commonly and spelled in Arabic. He strongly criticized this and called for the facilitation of the Persian language so that novices could better learn the language.

== Sections of the treatise ==
=== "Defects" of Persian language ===
In the first discourse of Zabân-e Pâk, Kasravi examines the shortcomings of the Persian language; These include mixing with foreign words, distance in verbs, misplaced addition of auxiliary verbs, inaccuracies of rules, transient and impermanent of some roots, substitutions, meaninglessness of some words, loss of words in their meanings Adjectives and interplay of verbs were mentioned.

=== Types of verbs ===
The second part of Zabân-e Pâk highlights the weakness of Persian language in expressing different tenses of verbs. Kasravi believes that Persian verbs had more than twenty types of tenses in the past, but over time, they have now degenerated. He revives and restores these verbs by proposing this subject and the analogy he presents with European languages. The result is stated in 13 past tense, 3 present tense and 3 future tense.

=== Close meanings mixed together ===
In the third part, Kasravi deals with another confusion of the Persian language, the ambiguity of some words and the multiplicity of words for a meaning that has led to the sterility and ambiguity of the language.

=== Extensions and prefixes ===
In the fourth part of Zabân-e Pâk, Kasravi, with the aim of expanding the range of Persian words, revives the ancient grammatical vessels of the Persian language and adds some cases to it in an innovative way.

=== New words ===
The fifth part of this book presents and expresses a collection of phrased words based on the grammatical system of pure language (Zabân-e Pâk).

== Views on script ==
In his the treatise, Kasravi suggests changing the Persian script. For the alphabet that should replace it, he believed that it would be better to create a new one, but due to some limitations, he ignores this and suggests that it would eventually be better to use the same Latin script that other languages have adopted, and to create new words only with signs at the bottom or top of the clauses.

== See also ==
- Romanization
  - Romanization of Persian
