= Muhammad ibn Husayn al-Rawadi =

Rawadid Dynasty founder

Amir of the Rawadids
- Reign: ? – 953–956
- Successor: Abu'l-Hayja Husayn I
- Died: 953–956
- Issue: Abu'l-Hayja Husayn I

Muhammad ibn Husayn al-Rawadi was the founder of the Rawadid dynasty, ruling parts of Armenia and Azarbaijan in the mid 10th-century. He was succeeded by his son Abu'l-Hayja Husayn I between 953–956.

== Biography ==
Map of Azarbaijan in the 9th and 10th-centuries

Muhammad ibn Husayn al-Rawadi's family was originally of Arab origin, ruling north-eastern Azarbaijan and the city of Tabriz as vassals of the Abbasid Caliphate in the late 8th and early 9th centuries. Like other Arab settlers in Azarbaijan, they most likely started to blend in with the local Iranian population to some extent in the 9th century. By the mid-10th century they had been fully Kurdicized as a result of intermarriage with local Kurdish families, giving themselves common Kurdish names such as Mamlan. The Ottoman historian Münejjim Bashi (d. 1702), who based his work on the now lost 12th-century Ta'rikh al-Bab wa'l-Abwab, considers Muhammad ibn Husayn the first ruler of the Kurdicized Rawadids, and adds that he ruled some districts in Armenia.

Since the fall of the Sajid governors of Azarbaijan in 929, the region had fallen out of caliphal control. A power struggle took place soon afterwards, which eventually resulted in the conquest of Azarbaijan, as well as eastern Transcaucasia by the Daylamite Sallarid dynasty of Tarom. In 948, the Sallarid ruler Marzuban ibn Muhammad (r. 941/2–957) was defeated and captured by the Buyids during a battle near the town of Qazvin. During his imprisonment between 948–953, Muhammad ibn Husayn took advantage of the absence of his suzerain, and seized some parts of Azarbaijan, most likely Ahar and Varzuqan. Regardless, Muhammad ibn Husayn's son and successor Abu'l-Hayja Husayn I paid tribute to Marzuban in 955/6, which indicates that Rawadids continued to acknowledge the Sallarids as their suzerain. Abu'l-Hayja Husayn I had seemingly succeeded his father between 953–956.

== Sources ==
- Madelung, Wilferd (1975). "Minor dynasties of northern Iran". In Frye, Richard N. (ed.). The Cambridge History of Iran. Vol. 4. Cambridge: Cambridge University Press. pp. 198–250. ISBN 0-521-20093-8.
- Peacock, Andrew (2017). "Rawwadids". Encyclopædia Iranica, online edition. New York.

Preceded by	Amir of the Rawadid dynasty ? – 953–956	Succeeded by Abu'l-Hayja Husayn I
