= Ahmad Kasravi =

Iranian academic (1890–1946)

- احمد کسروی
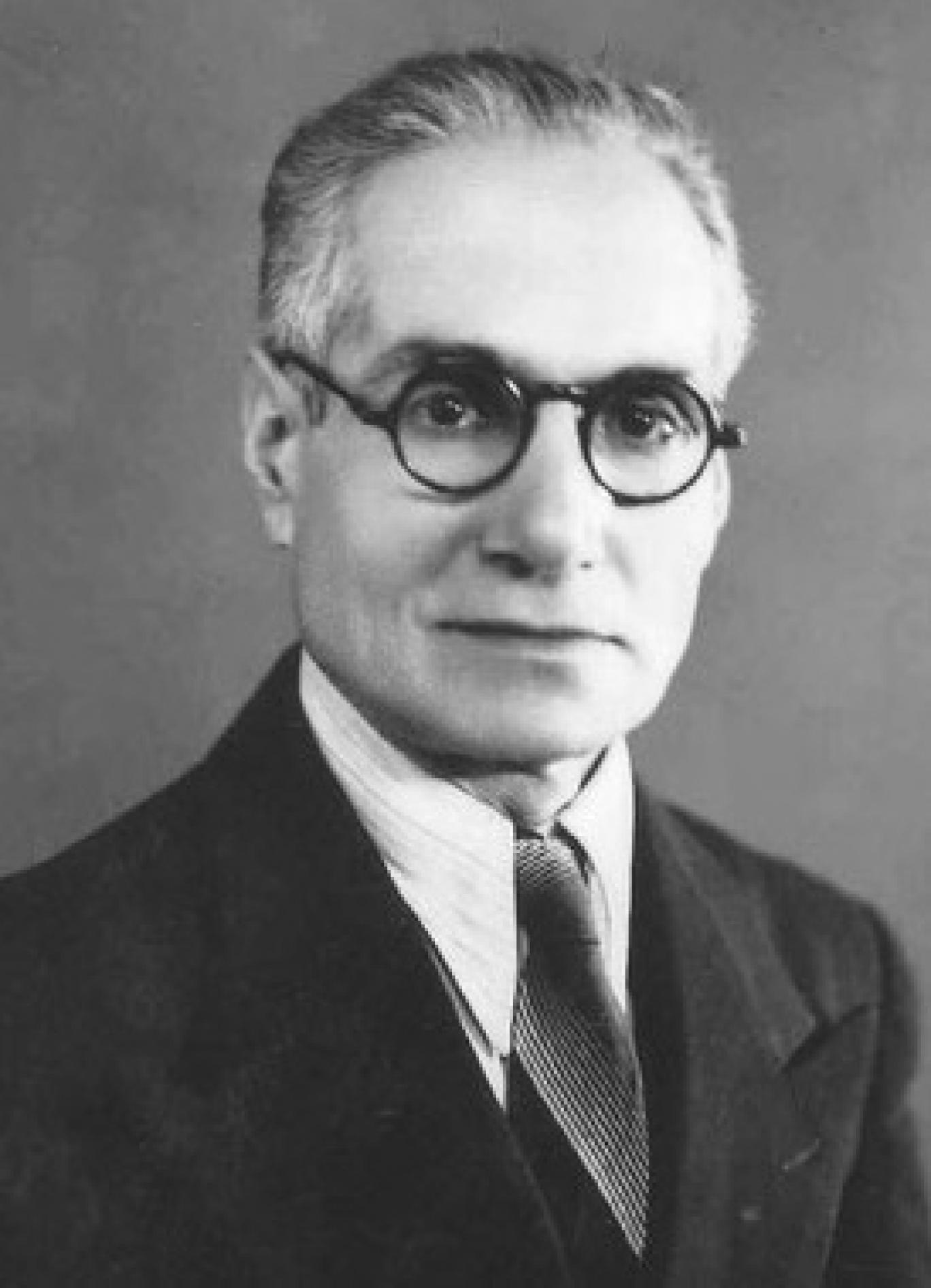
- Born: Ahmad Hokmabadi Tabrizi; 29 September 1890; Tabriz, Qajar Iran
- Died: 11 March 1946 (aged 55); Tehran, Pahlavi Iran
- Known for: Ancient languages, history, politics, religion
- Notable work: The Constitutional History of Iran; The Forgotten Kings; Shi'ism; Zabân-e Pâk; Azari or the Ancient Language of Azerbaijan

Ahmad Hokmabadi Tabrizi (Note: Persian: سید احمد حکم‌آبادی تبریزی, romanized: Ahmad-e Hokmâbâdi-ye Tabrizi) (29 September 1890 – 11 March 1946), later known as Ahmad Kasravi, was a pre-eminent Iranian historian, jurist, linguist, theologian, a staunch secularist and intellectual. He was a professor of law at the University of Tehran, as well as an attorney and judge in Tehran, Iran.

Born in Hokmavar (Hokmabad), Tabriz, Iran, Kasravi was an Iranian Azerbaijani. During his early years, Kasravi enrolled in a seminary. Later, he joined the Iranian Constitutional Revolution. He deserted his clerical training after this event and enrolled in the American Memorial School of Tabriz. Thenceforward he became, in Roy Mottahedeh's words, "a true anti-cleric."

Kasravi was the founder of a political-social movement whose goal was to build an Iranian secular identity. The movement was formed during the Pahlavi era. Kasravi authored more than 70 books, mostly in the Persian language. The most important book from his body of work are History of the Iranian Constitutional Revolution, Azari or the Ancient Language of Azerbaijan and The 18 Year History of Azerbaijan.

He was attacked vehemently by the Shi'ite clergy for his secular ideas and by the Pahlavi court for his anti-monarchical statements. In his early period he was linked with the Democrat Party in Iran. In 1941 he established a political party, Azadegan. Kasravi was eventually assassinated by followers of Navvab Safavi, the founder of the Shi'ite fundamentalist Fada'iyan-e Islam group. Many of the prominent members of the then Iranian clergy, including the later Ayatollah Ruhollah Khomeini, supported the act of Kasravi being murdered, and Navvab and the Fada'iyan were proclaimed heroes following the assassination. Kasravi was the first Iranian Azerbaijani intellectual to take a firm position against pan-Turkists from the Ottoman Empire, and authored the most important work on the Iranian identity of the Azerbaijan region and the region's Old Azeri language, an Iranian language. Kasravi is widely despised by pan-Turkists in the Republic of Azerbaijan and Iran, who view him as a "traitor" to Azerbaijanis.

== Life ==
=== Early life ===
Kasravi was born on 29 September 1890 in the Hokmavar neighborhood of Tabriz. His family adored him being their first son. His mother prevented him from playing with other peers. According to Kasravi himself, from the age of five, his head was shaved according to the tradition of that time, which made him very upset. He was sent to a school in Hekmavar when he was six years old. Nevertheless, Kasravi was a leader in learning, comparing himself to his peers, and he learned many things with his own efforts and with the help of his family. His father died at the age of 12 and (after two years of carpet weaving) he returned to religious school and continued it according to his father's will. Haji Mir Mohsen Agha, who was the husband of the aunt and guardian of the Kasravi family, sent him to the Talibiyeh school. In that school, Kasravi first studied in the school with a man named Mullah Hassan. Kasravi first met Sheikh Mohammad Khayabani, who taught Ptolemy, at the same school in Talebia.

In 1904, at the same time as the beginning of the Persian Constitutional Revolution in Tabriz, Kasravi first came across the name of the constitution and, according to him, he was dedicated to the constitution from the very beginning. At the same time, a young cleric in Hakmavar became the son-in-law of Mir Mohsen Agha, the guardian of Kasravi's family, and Mir Mohsen started the mosque of Nia Kasravi and forced Kasravi to learn from him; But the two were at odds. Kasravi's leaning towards the constitution and the opposition of this cleric and Mir Mohsen Agha to the constitution also increased his enmity. Therefore, Kasravi stopped learning from him, and as a result, his family guardian also resented Kasravi and changed his attitude towards him.

In 1908, Mohammad Ali Shah Qajar bombarded the Majlis. Tabriz was blockaded. At that time, Haji Mirza Hassan Mojtahed and a group of like-minded people in Dohchi formed the Islamic Association, and Kasravi, who was still a student at the time, was watching. After that, Tabriz suffered from conflict and bloodshed for four months, which resulted in the cessation of the Islamic Association. Kasravi, who was seventeen at the time, was forced to stay at home and read books. At this time, most of the people of Hakmavar, as well as Kasravi's family, were enemies of the constitution, and Kasravi, who had attached himself to the constitution, by force of circumstance, camouflaged his attachment. In the meantime, he followed the events of Tabriz until Tabriz calmed down and Kasravi started studying again. After studying for two years, he finally became a clergyman.

In 1909, Kasravi went down with typhus. As a result of this disease, Kasravi suffered from a constant disability that was always with him. He also suffered from anemia and his eyes became dim and he suffered from indigestion. After recovering from his illness, his relatives and locals, according to him, forcibly took him to the prayer mosque to become a cleric there. On the other hand, an opponent cleric, whose son-in-law was Mir Mohsen, also preached anti-Kasravi and called him a democrat in order to disperse the people around him. At this time, Kasravi sent his two younger brothers to Nejat Elementary School, which was not a good thing in the eyes of the people of that time, because his brothers, like other Sayyids, did not wear headscarves and did not wear green scarves. Kasravi, unlike other elected clerics, wore a beard, high-heeled shoes, and machine-made socks, wore a small turban, fastened his scarf, and wore glasses, which his opponents considered all because of his cult. After all, he did not fast and criticized the fasting people, and according to him, he only did things such as reciting the wedding sermon. From then on, he took over the management of his family, but he became poor. At this time, he began to recite the Qur'an and tried to learn the meaning of the verses of the Qur'an.

=== Leaving the profession of clergy ===
Ahmad Kasravi entered the Talibiyeh school in Tabriz as a teenager and studied Islamic sciences. After a while, as a Shiite missionary, he dressed as a Shiite cleric. At Talebieh School, he was a classmate of Sheikh Mohammad Khayabani and Sheikh Gholam Hossein Tabrizi. He was also in front of the Kasravi Mosque in the Hekmabad neighbourhood of Tabriz for a short time.

On 30 April 1909, the Russians clashed with the Mujahideen in Tabriz. Although Kasravi was far from a conflict in Hekmavar, this conflict and the stability of the Iranians affected him, and since Muharram had also begun, he advised the people on the pulpit. Kasravi was not satisfied with this and tried to join the fighters with several rifles; But the war did not last more than four days and the Mujahideen left the city and the Russians conquered Tabriz and appointed Samad Khan, one of the long-time enemies of the Constitution, over the city. Anti-constitutional clerics and their followers also inflicted severe violence on the constitutionalists. Kasravi was also forced to visit Samad Khan in Bagh-e Amir under the pressure of Haji Mir Mohsen Agha, Guardian their family. However, for the few days that he went to the pulpit, the clerics excommunicated him, and the cleric who was with him in Hakmavar incited the thugs to harm him, and eventually, the people gradually dispersed from his pulpit, and he thus withdrew from the clergy. According to him, the burden of the clergy was removed from his neck.

From then on, Kasravi was a homemaker for a while and read various books and became acquainted with the sciences of the day, and gradually found friends among the freedom seekers. According to Kasravi, one of the books that moved him to read was Ibrahim Bey's travelogue by Zeyn al-Abedin Maraghei.

=== After the clergy ===
Through the shop from which he bought the book, Kasravi met several freedom fighters, one of whom was a street that had come to the Caucasus and from there to Tabriz after the parliament closed, and thus a friendship developed between them. He also met Reza Soltanzadeh, who said that this friendship was lasting and lasted until the last years of Kasravi's life.

At this time, Kasravi made a marriage contract with his cousin, the eldest daughter of their family, Mir Mohsen Agha; But at this time he saw the persecution of the clergy and was accused of cultism and disbelief in religion. On the other hand, because he had nothing to do, he became poor, had to sell his books, and, of course, enlisted the help of his father's old friends. Kasravi was offered to weave socks and he bought a sock machine, but the machine was unhealthy and Kasravi returned it, however, the seller did not return his advance payment. He bought another sock weaving machine, but this one also got into trouble and he lost it.

Kasravi, who had failed to provide a career and had also sold his books, became very depressed. He was interested in three disciplines: mathematics, history and Arabic, and he spent his time learning and reading these. At this time he wrote a speech in Arabic for a magazine called Al-Irfan, which was published in Sidon, and sent it to publish it without any compromise.

=== Memorial School ===
In the summer of 1914, World War I broke out in Europe. At this time, the Ottomans advanced to Tabriz and repulsed Russia, but it was not long before they were defeated and retreated. Thus, Azerbaijan was the battlefield of the states involved in the war.

In 1915, Kasravi, in search of new knowledge, found himself in need of learning a European language. At first, he tried to learn French, but he knew that he could not learn without it. So he wanted to go to the American school in Tabriz called "Memorial School", so he went to Mr Chesp, the principal of that school, and repeated his request. Chesp considered Kasravi's high school year as a ban on his studentship at that school and had initially suggested that he go there as a teacher and study for two hours a day. Kasravi, who suffered from unemployment, accepted the offer and taught Arabic to the students who studied English themselves. It was in the first few months that he became self-taught about Esperanto and became attached to the language. He also chose a way to teach Arabic to his students. Then he wrote a book about this method called Al-Najm al-Darya, which was taught in Tabriz high schools for some time. In the American school, there were three Christian tribes (Armenian and Assyrian), Muslims and Ali-Illahis, which was a conflict between Christians and Muslims, and Kasravi was not relieved of this conflict. Some Muslim officials were also hostile to him there. Nevertheless, Kasravi calls Mr Chesp a righteous man who was far from religious.

Between 1915 and 1916, Kasravi, who was familiar with Baha'i history and beliefs, had discussions with the preachers of this religion.

At this time, too, Kasravi allegedly harassed clerics who knew he was going to an American school to study Babism.

=== Travel to the Caucasus ===
When the school closed on 2 July 1916, Kasravi borrowed loans from acquaintances to find work and health (doctors had offered to travel for further recovery) and travelled by rail to the Caucasus. During this trip, Kasravi tried to learn Russian. He went to Tiflis and left for Baku after two days. He did not find anything in Baku, so he boarded a ship and left for Ashgabat. Then he went to Mashhad and after a month he returned to Baku the way he had come and when he could not find work again he went to Tbilisi again. In Tiflis he became acquainted with freedom-seekers and also liked the city and its people, so he remained there for a while. There he became acquainted with botany. However, he did not find anything there. Then, in mid-October, he returned to Tabriz following his mother's motivation letter and the call of Mr Chesp, the director of the Memorial School.

=== Leaving the Memorial School ===
On his return, the enmity between Muslims and Armenians increased, and Kasravi had verbal confrontations with them until one day when he left school, several Armenian students followed him and dragged his cloak away. This led to a Muslim strike at the school, and although the principal apologized to him through the middle leg, Kasravi, who was upset, did not go to school anymore.

=== Joining the Democrat Party and post-February events ===
It was at this time in 1917 that Nicholas II, the last Russian tsar, was overthrown. This overthrow affected the time of Iran at that time, especially Tabriz, where the Russians were influential. Meanwhile, a street reopened the Democratic Party in Azerbaijan. At this time, according to Kasravi, some constitutionalists, who had suffered a great deal from others in the past six years, resorted to grudges that Kasravi tried to keep quiet and sheltered some of his former enemies. It was at this time that high schools opened and Kasravi was called to teach Arabic in high school. It was at this time that Kasravi joined the Democrat Party.

At this time, cholera spread in Tabriz and Kasravi also contracted the disease. Tabriz also suffered from drought. Under these circumstances, the government provided flour to the people, and the Democrats mediated the distribution of flour among the people. Kasravi also tried to do this in Hekmavar.

At the same time, Bolsheviks were in power in Russia. There was chaos in Iran as well, especially in Azerbaijan. The retreating Russians looted and destroyed cities like Khoy. In Urmia and Salmas, the Assyrian uprising caused bloodshed. With the onset of winter, the government, which fed the meagre, got into trouble and reduced their rations. Then typhoid and typhoid diseases spread in Tabriz and left many dead. Meanwhile, one of Kasravi's brothers and niece also fell ill but recovered, but Kasravi's mother Khadijeh Khanum contracted typhus and did not recover and died. This incident upset Kasravi and he said it was the saddest event in his life after his father's death.

In 1918, Ottoman troops invaded Azerbaijan. They were pessimistic about the Democrats, so they captured Sheikh Mohammad Khayabani and some of his allies and drove him out of Tabriz. The Ottomans formed a party in Tabriz called the Islamic Union, which was joined by a group of Tabrizis as well as Democrats, but Kasravi did not join them. At this time, Kasravi, who had been in the hands of enemies for some time, saw better to change his place of life, so he moved to Lilava, which was one of the best alleys in Tabriz at that time. At this time, Taqi Rifat, one of the street supporters, with the help of the Ottomans, founded a Turkish-language newspaper called Azarbadegan, in which he promoted Pan-Turkism. However, since World War I had led to the defeat of the Allies, in October of that year, the Ottoman troops left Tabriz and the Islamic Union collapsed. So Kasravi and the other Democrats reorganized their organization and expelled those who had collaborated with the Ottomans and tried to spread Pan-Turkism. They decided that from now on the party would use Persian language and one of its ideals would be to spread this language in Azerbaijan. In the meantime, Khiabani returned to Tabriz, but some of his actions, such as returning the expelled from the party and blaming others for his previous assassinations in Tabriz, angered the Democrats. In the meantime, Kasravi got bored and left the party. With the start of the fourth round of parliamentary elections on 21 July 1919, the street regrouped the Democrats and apologized for their previous actions, calling for the Democrats to show solidarity again; But still, the Khiabani dictatorship annoyed Kasravi and others. At this time, Vosugh od-Dowleh signed the 1919 agreement with Britain, but Mohammad Khiabani, contrary to the expectations of his allies, remained silent and did not act on it, which also increased the resentment of the Democrats. It was at this time that Kasravi began working in the judiciary (15 September 1919).

At the same time, divisiveness among Democrats escalated, with Kasravi splitting from the party. In the last meeting that took place between Kasravi and Khayabani, the two talked loudly, and after that Kasravi did not meet with Khayabani anymore. However, in his biography, Kasravi has expressed his remorse for being so big against a man who was eighteen or seventeen years older than him.

Shortly afterwards, Mohammad Khiabani revolted against the government. Kasravi and his companions disbanded their group, but Sheikh Khiabani pursued them and harassed a group of them. Kasravi also had to stay at home. After a few days, he had to go to Fakhrabad, a village two miles from Tabriz. Two weeks later, Major Edmund, the head of the British Political Bureau, called for a meeting with Kasravi. Kasravi went to the British Consulate in Tabriz and met with Major Edmund. According to Kasravi, Britain was concerned about the spread of Bolshevism, as Mirza Kuchik Khan had allied himself with them, and Britain wanted to abandon the ideology of Sheikh Khiabani. Major Edmund wanted to incite Kasravi to pursue a street fight, but Kasravi refused and explained that firstly his group would not be able to confront the street sheikh and secondly that he would not face him because his uprising was for Azerbaijan. At the same time, the Prime Minister had received a coded telegram from the critics that if you rise up to fight the street sheikh, the government will help you, which was also not accepted. At that time, Kasravi had returned to Tabriz, but he and his friends were under pressure and threats.

When a group of Kasravi's companions were arrested in the prison of Sheikh Khayabani, Kasravi had to leave Tabriz with his wife, leaving the cities and diyats alone until he contracted a nausea fever in Shahindaj and stayed there for a month and a half. Because there was no doctor there, Kasravi went to Tehran sometime later.

In Tehran, Kasravi met with his companions who had been expelled from Tabriz by a street sheikh. Although his illness had not left him, he went in search of work. He was eventually accepted to teach Arabic at Servat High School. Meetings were held in Tehran and Kasravi was asked to fight in the streets, but Kasravi refrained from doing so. Meanwhile, Mukhbar al-Saltanah, who had just become the governor of Azerbaijan, asked Kasravi to join him in quelling the street uprising, but Kasravi refused. Khiabani was killed two weeks later and the riot was suppressed.

=== Death of first wife ===
In Tehran, he wrote articles about the mourning for Nader Shah Afshar's grave, which led to his acquaintance with Esperanto groups. He also had meetings and discussions with Baha'is. In the meantime, he was appointed head of the Tabriz Judiciary, which he refused. Meanwhile, Kasravi had not yet brought his family to Tehran and did not have enough money to do so. In the meantime, he was offered membership in the Tabriz Appeal, which he accepted. In February, he set out for Tabriz, where snow and storm kept him on the road for twenty days. At this time, Azerbaijan, like other parts of Iran, was in turmoil, and Simko Shikak had conquered Urmia. The judiciary has also suffered a lot of corruption, as Kasravi said. The magazine Molla Nasraddin, which was published in Azerbaijan after the Caucasus uprising at the time, also covered the devastation in humorous language. However, Kasravi did not stay in Tabriz for more than three weeks, as Zia ol Din Tabatabaee took power in a coup d'etat and he had ordered the closure of the judiciary on 14 March. Thus Kasravi became unemployed again and faced poverty. In 1922, Tabatabaee was ousted and replaced by Ahmad Ghavam, but the judiciary remained closed. At this time, the Bolsheviks had looted Kasravi's brother's shop in Baku, and when he returned to Tabriz, Shahsevans took the rest of his property. Inevitably, Kasravi left his books to his brother to open a library and not be unemployed. At this time, Mukhbar al-Saltanah, who had a good relationship with Kasravi, paid Kasravi's remaining salary, and he paid his debts, and he was somewhat out of trouble. He wanted to go to Tehran when his wife fell ill. At this time, he and a group of thinkers were trying to spread Esperanto in Tabriz. At the end of September of that year, Kasravi's wife's condition worsened and her hands and feet became swollen. Doctors determined that he had dehydration and needed surgery. After the operation, she recovered for two days, but on the second night she died suddenly and Kasravi was deeply saddened. Kasravi's first wife was his youngest cousin, and Kasravi had no attachment to her and was forced to marry her only at the insistence of her family; But after the marriage, according to Kasravi, the woman had put her love in Kasravi's heart with her purity and simplicity.

=== In Mazandaran ===
After forty days after the death of his wife, on 20 September, Kasravi handed over his children to his brother and left for Tehran again. When Kasravi was on his way to Tehran, Mohammad Taqi Pessian was killed in Khorasan. On 12 October, after a long trip, he arrived in Tehran, and after some rest, he went to see the then Minister of Justice, Amid al-Saltanah, but there was no room for him in the judiciary. Thus, Kasravi was caught in bipolar again. He remarried in Tehran. Eventually, he was made a member of the Mazandaran Appeal. On 17 November, Kasravi left for Mazandaran, where at that time the only way to get there was to use horses and mules, and Kasravi rented a horse and ran away. At this time, Amir Moayed Savadkuhi had revolted against the government in Savadkuh and Sardar Sepah (Reza Shah) had sent an army to suppress him and Kasravi's caravan in Firoozkooh was prevented from following the trip. So the Cossacks sent him with another caravan, but because the caravan was not satisfied with his company, Kasravi left him and set off on foot to Sari. It was during this trip that Kasravi first came across Iranian dialects and became aware of their existence. Despite all the difficulties, he finally arrived in Sari and stayed there for four months, bringing his wife there as well. He enjoyed life in Mazandaran, where he studied the Mazandaran language and studied. At this time, Simko Shikak had reached Mahabad and surrendered to the gendarmes and killed them. On the other hand, in Mazandaran, Amir Moayed's revolt had subsided and he had surrendered.

=== In Damavand ===
In March, Tehran was informed that Mazandaran's appeal had been dismissed, and Kasravi had to leave for Tehran. On his return to Tehran, he met with Abdolhossein Teymourtash, and this acquaintance later led to their cooperation. After a while, he was sent to Damavand by the judiciary to resolve the disputes between the judiciary staff and the ruler there. After resolving the dispute, they asked him to stay in Damavand and Kasravi accepted. At this time, Kasravi began writing a book in Arabic called "Azerbaijan in the Twentieth Century" and sending it to the monthly Al-Irfan. In October, a law was passed to test the knowledge of judges, so Kasravi went to Tehran for the exam and he received the highest score in this exam. He stayed in Tehran for two months and spent this time researching the history of Mazandaran and writing notes on the history of Tabarestan in the weekly Nobahar and researching Ibn Esfandiar's manuscript and comparing it with foreign manuscripts, which he considered the beginning of his writing life.

=== In Zanjan ===
After a while, he was sent to Zanjan, where they had problems dismissing the former head of the court. After two months, he was offered to go to Arak and he accepted, but the offer was rejected by the people of Zanjan who wanted him to stay. In Zanjan, he resumed writing the book "Azerbaijan in the Twentieth Century". He also researched events related to the Babi movement in Zanjan, which later helped him write a book on Baha'ism. The differences between the dialects of the Zanjanis and the Azerbaijanis also prompted Kasravi to research the Azerbaijani Turkish language and its writings and works. At the end of the summer of 1923, Kasravi was sent to Qazvin to be tested by the judiciary. He went to Qazvin with his family and stayed there for a month, where he learned about Táhirih. After that, he returned to Zanjan. In the meantime, he made a trip to Soltanieh.

=== In Khuzestan ===
He was in Zanjan until the beginning of Sardar Sepah as prime minister. At that time, Mu'adh al-Saltanah had become the Minister of Justice. Kasravi also set conditions for the acceptance of Khuzestan, and when he was accepted, Kasravi also agreed to go to Khuzestan. Before leaving, he met Reza Khan Sardar Sepah for the first time. Sardar Sepah entrusted Kasravi to establish a judiciary that would be superior to the British judiciary on the other side of the Arvand River. Kasravi also set off and reached Khuzestan via Iraq (Baghdad and Basra). First, he went to Khorramshahr, then in Abadan he met Sheikh Khazal in his special ship. From there, he sat on a device and went to Ahvaz. Then it was difficult to go to Shushtar, which was the centre of Khuzestan at that time. Kasravi was surprised by the lack of interest in this city and its small size. There he learned that Khazal in Khuzestan did not dominate only Dezful, Shushtar and Ramhormoz, where he also bribed most government employees. Sheikh Khazal was also in the hands of mercenaries who, for example, had killed Sayyid Abdullah, one of the former heads of the judiciary, at the behest of one of these assassins. At this time, 250 Iranian troops were gathered in Salasel Fortress near Shushtar, which was the only government force in Khuzestan at that time, and Sheikh Khazal had a separate government from the central government of Iran. Britain, which benefits many in Khuzestan, also supported Khazal. At this time, Reza Khan was thinking of restoring the central government's influence over this part of Iran.

At first, Khazal and his sons were pleased to know that Kasravi had knowledge of Arabic, but when Kasravi wrote in Arabic newspapers in response to Khuzestan's independent reading and called Khuzestan part of Iran, Khazal became angry with him. Kasravi visited Susa and Dezful in Khuzestan. He also saw the ruins of Jundishapur. In Khuzestan, when he became acquainted with the Arabs of that region, he knew that few people except his graduates were familiar with eloquent Arabic. He also knew that not all Arabs have a good relationship with Sheikh Khazal. At this time, Kasravi was constantly reporting to the Prime Minister on the critical situation in Khuzestan.

== Religion ==
A proponent of reform in Islam, he was respected for his deep knowledge of the religion, as "even his orthodox opponents admit that Kasravi was an able theologian and regard his Shari'ate Ahmadi as the best book on the fundamentals of Islam and Shi'ism of his time", and, like Dr. Ali Shariati some three decades later, Kasravi considered that there were two kinds of Islam:

[O]ne is the religion that that honourable Arab man brought one thousand, three hundred and fifty years ago and was established for centuries. The other is the Islam that there is today and has turned into many colours from Sunnism, Shi'ism, Esmaili, Aliollahi, Sheikhi, and Karimkhani, and the like. They call both Islam, but they are not one. They are completely different and are opposite of one another.... Nothing is left of that Islam. This establishment that the mullahs are running not only does not have many benefits but also causes many harms and results in wretchedness.

Basically, he believed and wrote that "all the present-day representations of Islam have deviated from the essence and the true concept of its foundation". He was particularly critical of Shia (since its formation since the sixth emam, Emam Jafar Sadegh) and Sufism, to which he ascribed many ills, from its supposed promotion of stagnation, "irrationality" or even being a tool of the Orientalists. His main target in that field was the famous E. G. Browne, appreciated by Iranian intellectuals of all tendencies, whom he accused to have favoured Sufi poetry in his history of Persian literature, and thus trying to characterize the Iranian spirit with the errors he thinks belong to Sufis (immorality, irrationality, etc.), further promoting idleness and passivity in order to keep Iran subjugated to foreign imperialists. His criticism of Hafez Shirazi followed the same path, considering him "a source of disgrace", saying that his "immorality" was due to the fact that the Mongols were the new rulers in the region, not respectful of Islamic law, thus letting some Sufis (like Hafez) "free to indulge in drinking wine, whereas previously they had to be cautious not to offend the Islamic sentiments of the rulers and the religious authorities." Kasravi was also critical about the Baháʼí Faith and considered it as another continuation of the same deviation that started from Shia (penetration and influence of Old Iranian and Judaism beliefs about "a supposed to come saviour" into Islam) to Shaykhism (followers of Shaykh Ahmad) then Babism (followers of Ali Muhammad, called the Bab), then into the Baháʼí Faith. Abbas Amanat, professor of history at Yale University, believes that Kasravi's work regarding the Bahá'ís, called Bahaigari, is "a short polemic of little historical value". He further explains "in his criticism of the Bab, he hardly takes into account the historical circumstances under which the movement first appeared and his pontifical judgements no doubt are influenced by his own vision of pakdini lit.pure religion ".

Kasravi's views threatened both modernist (blind followers of western culture in materialistic concept) intellectuals and the traditionalist cleric class (who worked along and gave legitimacy to traditionalists and Shia leaders who oppose progressive needed changes to modernize the country), not only because of his vision of religion (apart from Shi'a faith and Sufism, he was also sceptical of the Baháʼí), but also due to his critical stance on secularism and the fact that he was "the first Iranian to criticize modernism and Eurocentrism before Al-e Ahmad coined the term 'Weststruckness' and made it a genre."

== Selected works ==
God Is with Us or Khoda Ba Mast is a book by Ahmad Kasravi in which he discusses Sufism, which was published in 1944. It has eight chapters. In the introduction, he touches on some common beliefs about Sufism; for example, he says that Sufism has many followers and is very diverse and that there are Sufis in places such as Tehran, Mashhad, Shiraz, Maragheh, etc. He goes on to claim that it is not true that science will destroy Sufism and talks about why Europeans adore Sufism. He talks about the root of Sufism and its origin in Greek philosophy. Like his other books about Shia and Baháʼí beliefs, he criticizes Sufism and brings up contradictions and flaws in Sufism; in the second chapter, for example, he mentions the fact that most of Sufis do not have any occupation, do not get married, and do not care about life before death. The third chapter is about Islam and Sufism, and the bad things followers of Sufism have done to Islam. The next chapter is about the negative effect of Sufism on its followers because of the nature of the belief system. In the sixth chapter he calls followers of Sufism liars, and criticizes the message of their books as "kramat". The next two chapters are about the Mongolians' attack on Iran and its relationship with Sufism; Kasravi blames Sufism for Iran’s defeat. The last chapter is about the Greek philosopher Plotinus, whom Kasravi believes is the founder of Sufism, and Kasravi's critique of his ideas. The book attacks all Sufi beliefs, taking some examples from Sufi books.

Kasravi also published several periodicals: Payman (1932–1942) and Parcham (1942–1944).

== Works about the old Azari language ==
Kasravi is known for his solid and controversial research work on the ancient Azari language. He showed that the ancient Azari language was an offshoot of Middle Persian. Due to this discovery, he was granted membership of the London Royal Asiatic Society and American Academy.

Arguing that the ancient Azari language had been closely related to Persian language and the influx of Turkic words began only with the Seljuq invasion, Ahmad Kasravi believed that the true national language of Iranian Azerbaijan was Persian and therefore advocated the linguistic assimilation of Persian in Azarbaijan. In 1927-8, Ahmad Kasravi led the way in establishing the ancestry of the Safavids dynasty with the publication of three influential articles, and disputed the validity of the 'official' Safavid family tree contained in the Safvat al-Safa, and argued convincingly that the ancestors of Shaykh Safi al-Din, who founded the Safavid Order (tariqa), were indigenous inhabitants of Iran. Today, the consensus among Safavid historians is that the Safavid family hailed from Iranian Kurdistan.

== Assassination ==
Our words have deep strong roots, and will never be eradicated with a pistol. There will be no better result from using a pistol than bloodshed. Say and write whatever you like, we will never be offended, but your support for thugs has a different meaning.

— Ahmad Kasravi

On 11 March 1946, while being tried on charges of "slander against Islam", Kasravi and one of his assistants named Seyyed Mohammad Taghi Haddadpour, were knifed and killed in open court in Tehran by followers of Navvab Safavi, a Shi'a extremist cleric who had founded an organization called the Fadayan-e Islam (literally Devotees of Islam), led by two brothers, Hossein and Ali-Mohammad Emami. The same group had failed in assassinating Kasravi earlier in April 1945 in Tehran. Ayatollah Borujerdi and Ayatollah Sadr al-Din al-Sadr had issued fatwas for killing Ahmad Kasravi. The future Supreme Leader of Iran, Ruhollah Khomeini, was also against Kasravi's ideas and had called for young martyrs for Islam to counter "this illiterate Tabrizi" a few weeks after the first unsuccessful assassination attempt.

== Books ==
Some of his more famous books are as follows:

=== Historical ===
- The 18 Year History of Azerbaijan (Persian: تاریخ هیجده ساله‌ی آذربایجان, romanized: Târix-e Hijdahsâle-ye Âzarbâyjân)
- History of the Iranian Constitutional Revolution (Persian: تاریخ مشروطه‌ی ایران, romanized: Târix-e Mašrute-ye Irân)
- The Forgotten Kings (Persian: شهریاران گم‌نام, romanized: Šahriyârân-e Gomnâm)
- The 500 Year History of Khuzestan (Persian: تاریخ پانصد ساله‌ی خوزستان, romanized: Târix-e Pânsadsâle-ye Xuzestân)
- Musha'sha'iyian or Part of Khuzestan's History
- Histories of Tabaristan and Our Notes
- Sheikh Muhammad Khiabani's Uprising
- History of America's Discovery
- An Excerpt of Plutarch's Book
- Kasravi's Karvand
- A Brief History of The Lion and Sun
- Sheikh Safi and His Progeny (Persian: شیخ صفی و تبارش, romanized: Šeyx Safi va Tabâraš)
- History of the Lion and the Sun (Persian: تاریخچه شیروخورشید, romanized: Tāriḵča-ye šir o ḵoršid), 1931
- History and Its Advice
- History of the Jewish People

=== Linguistic ===
- Azari or the Ancient Language of Azerbaijan (Persian: آذری یا زبان باستان آذربایجان, romanized: Âzari yâ Zabân-e Bâstân-e Âzarbâyjân)
- Zabân-e Pâk
- The Book of "K" (Kafnama)
- The Iranian Language: Originally published as "Kasravi's Papers on the Persian Language by Hasan Yazdani in 1979, is a collection of all Kasravi's writings on the matter of Persian language and linguistics throughout his life.

=== Political ===
- The Court
- What is the Solution Today?
- What Should be Done Today?
- What will be Iran's Destiny?
- The Government Should Answer Us
- In the Path of Politics
- We and Our Neighbours
- Our Officers
- What are the Benefits of the United Nations?

=== Religious and social books ===
- The Sacred Foundation
- On the Matter of Kherad
- On the Matter of Animals
- On the Matter of Islam
- In Response to Haqiqatgu
- On the Matter of Materialism
- On the Matter of Philosophy
- On the Matter of Ravan
- On the Matter of Novels
- Šiʿigari (Shiʿism), 1943, revised as Beḵᵛānid o dāvari konid or Beḵᵛānand o dāvari konand (Read and Judge), 1944
- Baháʼísm
- Sufism
- What is "Culture"?
- Inquisition in Iran
- Religion and the World
- The Maladies and The Remedies
- Questions and Answers
- God is with Us
- Our Sisters and Daughters
- What Do We Want?
- Questions and Answers
- A Conversation (Goft-o-Shenid, Literally "Said and Heard")
- In Response to Ill-wishers
- Is it Culture or Malice?
- Now and the Future Belongs to Us
- A Letter to the Men of Science in Europe and America
- Superstitions (Pendarha, literally "Suppositions")
- Work, Jobs, and Money
- The First of Dey and Its Story
- The First of Dey, 1322
- The Way of Salvation

=== Autobiographies ===
- My Life (1944)
- 10 Years in the Judiciary (1944)
- Why did I leave the Ministry of Justice? (A speech on 22 November 1944)

=== Literature ===
- What does Hafez say?
- The Nation's Judgement On Poetry in Iran
- On Poetry and Sufism
- Kasravi's Speech In the Literary Circle

== See also ==
- Intellectual Movements in Iran
- Kashf al-Asrar
