= Payman =

Cultural and political magazine in Iran (1933–1942)

- Editor: Reza Soltanzadeh
- Categories: Cultural magazine; Political magazine
- Frequency: Monthly
- Founder: Ahmad Kasravi
- Founded: 1933
- First issue: December 1933
- Final issue: 1942
- Country: Pahlavi Iran
- Language: Persian

Payman (Persian: پیمان [peɪˈmɑːn], literally 'Promise') was a cultural and political magazine in Iran. It was one of the periodicals which was published and edited by Iranian religious reformist Ahmad Kasravi in the period 1933–1942.

== History and profile ==
The first issue of Payman appeared in December 1933. The title of the magazine was a reference to another magazine with the same name in which Ziya Gökalp, an Ottoman nationalist intellectual, published articles at the beginning of the 20th century. Kasravi's close ally Reza Soltanzadeh was the editor of Payman. Nearly all the articles published in the magazine were written by Kasravi. Payman came out biweekly during the first six months. Then it was published on a monthly basis and became the official organ of the political party, Azadegan, in 1941 when Kasravi founded the party.

In the first seven years the subtitle of Payman was gozaresh-e sharq va gharb (Persian: Account of East and West). Then it was changed to dar bareh-ye shenakhtan-e jahan (Persian: On Knowing the World) and gozaresh-e jahan (Persian: World Report). Payman folded in 1942 and was succeeded by Parcham.

== Content ==
Kasravi's writings in Payman outlined his general ideology. His articles mostly contained a critical approach towards the Europeanization of Iran and the alienation of Iranian people from their own customs and traditions. Kasravi also criticized Iranian poets, Sufis and materialism in his writings. Other topics which he attacked in the magazine included superstitions in Shiism and Islam. His lecture delivered at the Literary Society was serialized in Payman in two parts. After the publication of the first part Prime Minister Mohammad Ali Foroughi ordered the next issue of the magazine to be censored which would cover its second part. Although the next issue was published, it did not feature the remaining part of Kasravi's lecture. In addition, Payman contained a column on international politics.

== Legacy ==
A collection of Kasravi's writings published in Payman was printed as a book in 1965. The Chicago Persian Microfilms Project initiated by the University of Chicago in 1985 archived the issues of Payman.
