= Abu Nasr Husayn II =

Disputed ruler of Adharbayjan from 1001 to 1025

Abu Nasr Husayn II was the supposed Rawadid amir (ruler) of Adharbayjan from 1001 to 1025. A son of the Rawadid amir Abu'l-Hayja Mamlan I, Abu Nasr Husayn II's regnal period is disputed in scholarship.

According to the contemporary Armenian historian Stephen of Taron, Abu'l-Hayja Mamlan I died in 988/9, however he most likely confused him with another Abu'l-Hayja, who was from the Sallarid dynasty. The Ottoman historian Münejjim Bashi (d. 1702), who based his work on the now lost 12th century Ta'rikh al-Bab wa'l-Abwab, reports that Abu'l-Hayja Mamlan I died in 1001. However, coinage struck in the name of Muhammad ibn Husayn Rawad (another name of Abu'l-Hayja Mamlan I) appear in 1002, 1009 and 1014, which indicates that he ruled for longer than reported. Another theory is that the coins were minted by another ruler of the same name. Münejjim Bashi further reports that Abu'l-Hayja Mamlan I was succeeded by Abu Nasr Husayn II, who ruled till his death in 1025. This likewise contradicts coin findings, with one struck in Abu'l-Hayja Mamlan I's other son Abu Mansur Wahsudan's name in 1016, which suggests that the latter became ruler between 1014 and 1016. The modern historian Andrew Peacock suggests that the Rawadid kingdom was divided between Wahsudan and Abu Nasr Husayn II, or that the latter's reign was short-lived. He further adds that Wahsudan may even have succeeded his father directly.

== Sources ==
- Peacock, Andrew (2017). "Rawwadids". Encyclopædia Iranica, online edition. New York.
