= Qatran Tabrizi =

Persian poet (11th century AD)

- قطران تبریزی
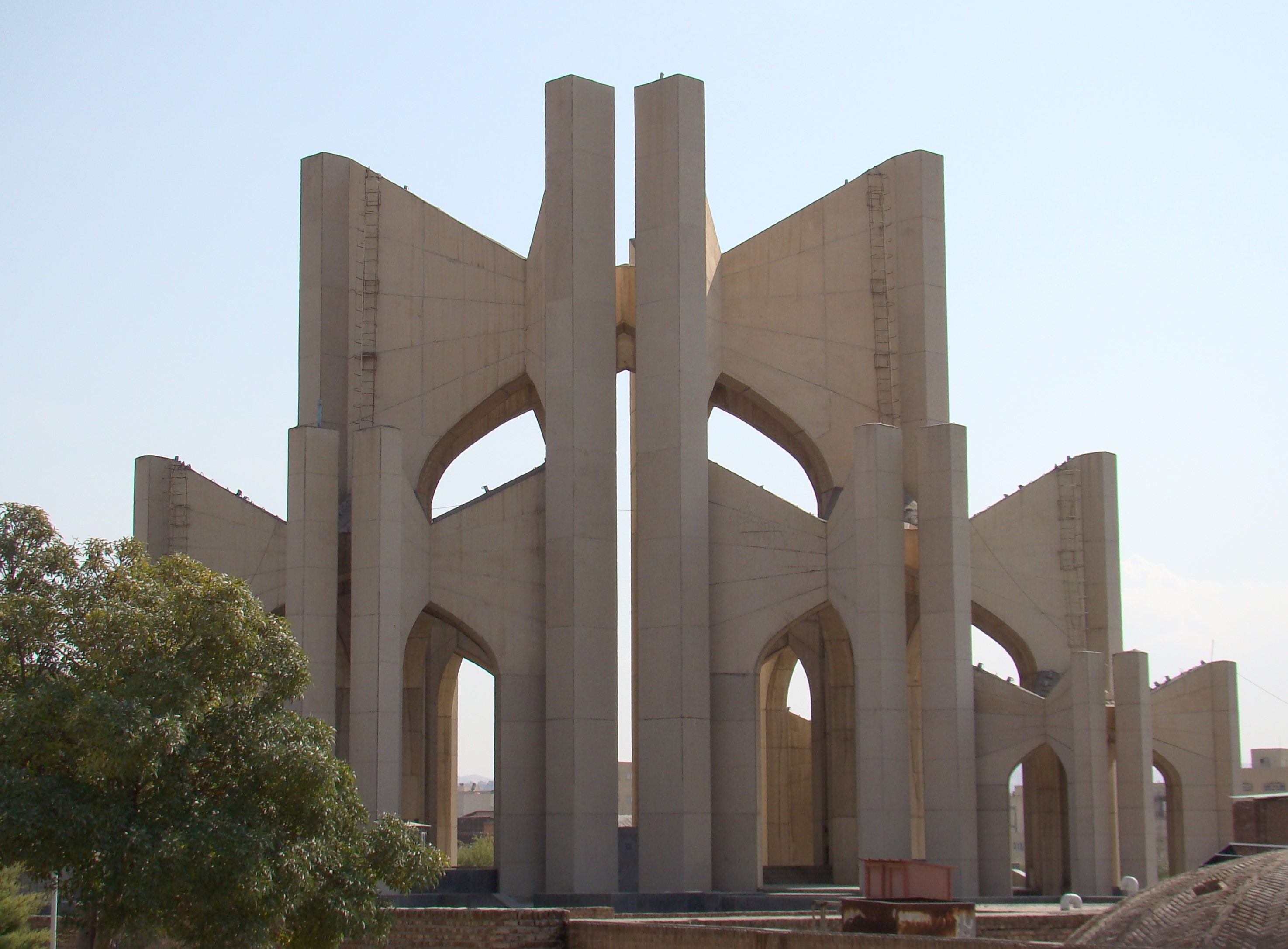
- The Maqbaratoshoara in Tabriz, Iran, where Qatran is buried
- Born: 1009–1014; Shadiabad, Azarbaijan, Rawadid dynasty
- Died: after 1088; Ganja, Arran, Shaddadid dynasty

Qatran Tabrizi (Persian: قطران تبریزی; 1009–1014 – after 1088) was a Persian writer, who is considered to have been one of the leading poets in 11th-century Iran. A native of the northwestern region of Azarbaijan, he spent all of his life there as well as in the neighbouring region of Transcaucasia, mainly serving as a court poet under the local dynasties of the Rawadids and Shaddadids.

== Background ==
Qatran was born between 1009 and 1014 in Shadiabad, near the city of Tabriz in the northwestern region of Azarbaijan. Shadiabad is mentioned as his hometown in one of his verses, which dismisses other accounts, which calls him by the nisbas of Tirmidhi, Jabali, Jili, Urmawi, Ajali. According to the 15th-century Timurid-era biographer Dawlatshah Samarqandi, the name of Qatran's father was Mansur, but this is not supported by earlier sources. Qatran is given the epithet of "Adudi" in several sources, which has been suggested to be a corruption of Azdi, the name of an Arab tribe which the ruling Rawadid dynasty was descended from.

== Biography ==
Map of Azarbaijan and its surroundings

Not much is known about the life of Qatran. As a Western Persian who spoke the Iranian dialect of Azari, (Note: Azari was the original language of Azarbaijan, spoken by the majority until the end of the 14th-century.) Qatran had some difficulties in understanding "Parsi" (i.e. Dari), the Eastern Persian dialect of Khurasan. This is mentioned in the Safarnama of the Khurasanian poet Nasir Khusraw when he met him in Tabriz in 1046; "He wrote good poetry, but did not know Persian well. He came to me bringing the diwan of Munjik and Daqiqi, which he read with me, questioning me about every passage in which he found difficulty. I told him its meaning and he wrote it down." Dari contained Eastern Iranian words (such as Sogdian), which were unintelligible to a Western Persian like Qatran. It was seemingly due to this that Qatran composed a lexicon written in Persian, named Tafasir fi lughat al-Furs, which has not survived. His work is mentioned in the preface of the Persian lexicon of his contemporary Asadi Tusi, which was composed for the educated population of Azarbaijan. Asadi never cites any of Qatran's verses in his lexicon, which further underscores that the intention of the work was to clarify the uncommon words used in Eastern Persian. With the reunification of Iran by Seljuk Empire in the mid 11th-century, eastern Persian literature had a better opportunity to sway the western provinces. (Note: Qatran's Rawadid and Shaddadid patrons were forced to acknowledge Seljuk suzerainty in 1054.)

Qatran seemingly spent all of his life in Azarbaijan and Transcaucasia, where he served under local rulers. His diwan was compiled and published by the 20th-century Iranian businessman and collector Hajj Mohammad Nakhjavani (died 1962). It contains 3000–10,000 couplets, which mentions about thirty patrons. The majority of the odes in his diwan are dedicated to the Rawadid rulers of Tabriz, Abu Mansur Wahsudan (r. 1019–1059) and his successor Abu Nasr Mamlan II (r. 1058/9–1070), as well as the Shaddadid rulers of Ganja, Abu'l-Aswar Shavur ibn Fadl (r. 1022–1067) and Fadl ibn Shavur (r. 1067–1073). Other notable patrons include Abu Dulaf-i Dayrani, the ruler of Nakhchivan. Some works have been erroneously attributed to Qatran, such as the Qausnama ("The Book of Arch"), which was in reality the work of a certain Qatran Tirmidhi, who lived 100 years after him. Some works of the prominent Persian poet Rudaki (died 941) have also erroneously been attributed to Qatran, due to the similarity of their styles, and the names of their patrons, the Samanid ruler Nasr ibn Ahmad (r. 914–943) and Abu Nasr Mamlan. Qatran was the first poet from Azarbaijan to compose poetry in Dari. He also compiled a Persian dictionary called, Tafāsīr fī lughat al-furs, of which there are no known copies left in existence.

Qatran's work is also an important source in historiography, as many names and events in Azarbaijan and the Caucasus mentioned in his poems would have been otherwise unknown. This includes among other things the Ghuzz incursions into Arran and Azarbaijan, and the peace treaty between the Rawadids and Shaddadids in 1040. During his later career, Qatran suffered from gout, possibly an indication of his good welfare. Qatran died in Ganja; the date of his death is uncertain. According to some accounts of writers such as the 19th-century Persian poet Reza-Qoli Khan Hedayat, Qatran died in 1072. However, one of Qatran's qasidas dedicated to Abu Nasr Mamlan indicate that he at least lived till 1088. According to Taqi, Qatran died in 1092.

== Legacy ==
Qatran is considered to have been one of the leading poets in 11th-century Iran. The modern historian De Bruijn calls him the first eminent poet born in the western Iranian provinces.

== Sources ==
- de Blois, Francois (2004). Persian Literature - A Bio-Bibliographical Survey: Poetry of the Pre-Mongol Period (Volume V). Routledge. ISBN 978-0947593476.
- de Bruijn, J.T.P. (1978). "Iran, vii.—Literature". In van Donzel, E.; Lewis, B.; Pellat, Ch. & Bosworth, C. E. (eds.). The Encyclopaedia of Islam, Second Edition. Volume IV: Iran–Kha. Leiden: E. J. Brill. pp. 52–75. ISBN 978-90-04-05745-6. OCLC 758278456.
- Dehghan, I. (1978). "Ḳaṭrān". In van Donzel, E.; Lewis, B.; Pellat, Ch. & Bosworth, C. E. (eds.). The Encyclopaedia of Islam, Second Edition. Volume IV: Iran–Kha. Leiden: E. J. Brill. ISBN 978-90-04-05745-6. OCLC 758278456.
- Ettehad, Hushang (2009). "Naḵjavāni, Ḥājj Moḥammad". Encyclopædia Iranica, online edition. New York.
- Frye, R. N. (2004). "Iran v. Peoples of Iran (1) A General Survey". In Yarshater, Ehsan (ed.). Encyclopædia Iranica. Vol. XIII/3: Iran II. Iranian history–Iran V. Peoples of Iran. London and New York: Routledge & Kegan Paul. pp. 321–326. ISBN 978-0-933273-89-4.
- Paul, Ludwig (2000). "Persian Language i. Early New Persian". Encyclopædia Iranica, online edition. New York.
- Mackenzie, D. N. (1997). "Kāmūs 2. Persian Lexicography". In Van Donzel, E.; Lewis, B.; Pellat, CH. (eds.). Encyclopaedia of Islam. Vol. IV: Iran-Kha. E.J. Brill. pp. 524–528. ISBN 90 04 05745 5.
- Peacock, Andrew (2000). "Shaddadids". Encyclopædia Iranica, online edition. New York.
- Peacock, Andrew (2017). "Rawwadids". Encyclopædia Iranica, online edition. New York.
- Rypka, Jan (1968). History of Iranian Literature. Springer Netherlands. ISBN 978-9401034814.
