= Rawwadid dynasty =

900–1071 Kurdish Muslim dynasty in Azerbaijan

- Late 8th century–c. 13th century
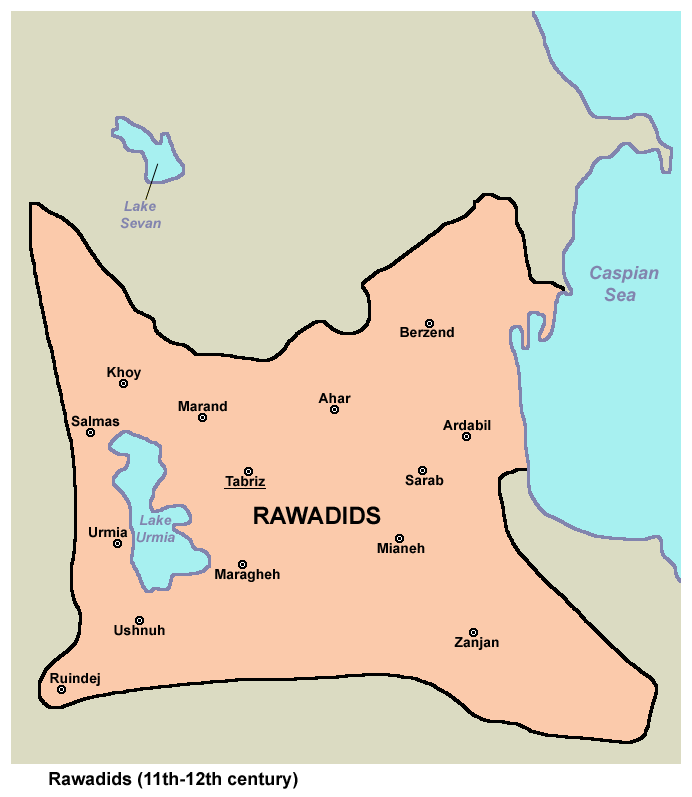
- Rawadids in the 11th and 12th centuries
- Capital: Tabriz
- Other languages: New Persian (court, literature); Adhari (local)
- Religion: Sunni Islam
- Government: Emirate
- History
  - Established: Late 8th century
  - Disestablished: c. 13th century

Area
  - Total: 250.000 km^{2} (96.526 sq mi)
Preceded by	Succeeded by
Sallarid dynasty	Seljuk Empire; Ahmadilis

Rawwadid, Ravvadid (also Revend or Revendi), or Banū Rawwād (Arabic: بنو رَوّاد) was a Muslim dynasty of Arab origin that initially controlled Tabriz and north-eastern Azerbaijan in the late 8th and early 9th centuries. Their descendants, who later became Kurdicized and are described in medieval sources as Kurdish, ruled over Azerbaijan and parts of Armenia in the second half of the 10th and much of the 11th century.

== History ==
=== Origin ===
Several scholars (Bosworth, Kasravi, Madelung, McDowall) believe the origin to be connected with the name of the Arab tribal leader Rawwad ibn Muthanna (ca. 200/815), who was the Abbasid governor of Tabrīz. Hugh Kennedy calls the origins of the Rawwadids ‘something of a mystery’. He notes that an Azdī Arab family called the Banū Rawwād settled in Azerbaijan in the early Abbasid period, but says it is not clear they were connected to the later Kurdish dynasty. He adds that it has been ‘plausibly suggested’ that the Rawwadids were the leading family of the Hadhbānī Kurds, after whom Rawanduz was named. Ismet Cheriff Vanly takes the two periods of the dynasty to be entirely distinct, with the Hadhbānī Kurds themselves seizing Marāgha and Tabrīz, no longer as associated troops but as dynasts, whereas Vladimir Minorsky holds it was the same family in both periods.

The majority of scholars holds that Rawadids were of Azdi Arab descent, arriving in the region in the mid 8th century, but had become Kurdicized by the late 10th century and began to use Kurdish forms like Mamlan for Muhammad and Ahmadil for Ahmad as their names. Boris James reports this as the most widely accepted view, and he reports Minorsky's and Vanly's opposing views, asks whether the form Rawānd in the Sharaf Nāma is this Arab eponym Iranized or an original name altered by Arabic authors, and suggests both forms may have circulated. He considers it likely that the Ayyubids’ ancestors were Hadhbānī Kurds of the Rawādiyya group, who probably moved from Azerbaijan toward Armenia in the service of the Shaddādids.

Arabic chronicles (Ibn al-Athir, Ibn Khallikan, al-Dhahabi) describe the Rawwādiya Kurds as a branch (baṭn or fakhdh) of the Hadhbāni. Ibn al-Athir described them as the noblest of the Kurds. The Sharafnama gives the form Rawende. Bernard Charmoy conjectured the reading Rawendiyeh.

According to Fisher and Boyle, the local poet Qatran Tabrizi praised them for their Arab ancestry. In his odes, Qatran says that Wahsudan's lineage (nasab) draws him toward the ʿajam (non-Arabs) while his essence (gawhar) draws him toward the Arabs, and that Mamlan's lineage (nasab) is from the ʿajam while his honour (ḥasab) is from the Arabs.

=== Rawadid emirate of Adharbayjan ===
According to Kasravi, Rawadids conquered the lands of the Musafirid ruler Ibrahim I ibn Marzuban I, in Adharbayjan in 979. Abu Mansur Wahsudan (1019–1054) is the best known Rawwadid ruler, and is mentioned by Ibn Athir. According to Ahmad Kasravi, sixty panegyric qasidas of the poet Qatran Tabrizi (11th century) dedicated to Wahsudan have been preserved. After the Oghuz revolt against Mahmud Ghaznavi (998–1030) in Khorasan in 1028, about 2,000 Oghuz families fled to the west. Wahsudan protected and allowed some of them to settle in the territory of the Rawwadis. He gave them land and made them vassals, intending to use them in the wars against the Byzantine Empire. The regions of Tabriz, Maragha and the strongholds of Sahand mountain were in his possession. In 1029, he helped the Hadhbani Kurds in Maragha to defeat the invading Oghuz Turkish tribes.

According to Ibn Athir, Wahsudan formed a marriage alliance with the first group of Oghuz Turks reached Adharbayjan to act against his enemies. This alliance stimulated animosity of the Shaddadid ruler Abu’l-Ḥasan Laškari. Another group of Turks arrived in Adharbayjan in 1037–1038. After they looted Maragha, Wahsudan and his nephew Abu’l-Hayjā put aside their problems and joined forces against the Ghuzz Turks. Turks were dispelled to Rayy, Isfahan, and Hamadan. A group of Turks remained in Urmiya. Wahsudan invited their leaders to a dinner and slaughtered them in 1040–1041.

Qatran mentioned about several battles between Wahsudan and a group of a Ghuzz reached Adharbayjan in 1041–1042. An intense battle in the desert of Sarāb resulted in the Rawwadids’ defeat on the Turks.

After banishing the Oghuz, Wahsudan improved relations with Shaddadids and travelled in person to Ganja, center of Shaddadids.

Wahsudan also sent an expedition to Ardabil under the command of his son Mamlan II. The ruler (sipahbod) of Moghan had to submit to the conqueror. Mamlan also built a fortress in Ardabil.

A devastating earthquake in 1042–1043 destroyed much of Tabriz, its walls, houses, markets, and much of the Ravvadis' palace. Although Ibn al-'Asir said that 50,000 people died in Tabriz, Nasir Khosrow, who passed through Tabriz four years later gave the number of dead 40,000 and stated that the city was prospering at the times of his visit. Wahsudan himself was saved because he was in a garden outside the city.

The Seljuks under Tughril conquered the principality in 1054 CE, and he defeated the prince of Tabriz Wahsudan ibn Mamlan and brought his son Abu Nasr Mamlan. In 1071, when Alp Arslan returned from his campaign against the Byzantine Empire, he deposed Mamlan. Wahsudan's successor, Ahmad bin Wahsudan, lord of Maragha, took part in Malik Shah's campaign against Syria in 1110 CE. His full title was Ahmadil bin Ibrahim bin Wahsudan al-Rawwadi al-Kurdi. Ahmadil fought again the crusaders during the First Crusade. Joscelin made a peace treaty with him during the siege of Tell Bashir (in present-day southern Turkey, south-east of Gaziantep). He was stabbed to death by the Isma'ili assassins in 1117 in Baghdad. His descendants continued to rule Maragha and Tabriz as Atabakane Maragha until the Mongol invasion in 1227.

== Rawadid rulers ==
1. Muhammad ibn Husayn al-Rawadi (? – c. 953?)
2. Abu'l-Hayja Husayn I (955–988)
3. Abu'l-Hayja Mamlan I (988–1000)
4. Abu Nasr Husayn II (1000–1025)
5. Abu Mansur Wahsudan (1025–1058/9)
6. Abu Nasr Mamlan II (1058/9–1070)
7. Ahmadil ibn Ibrahim ibn Wahsudan (in Maragha; c.1100–1116)

=== Burial place ===
Imamzadeh Chaharmanar in Tabriz is the burial place of Rawadid rulers.

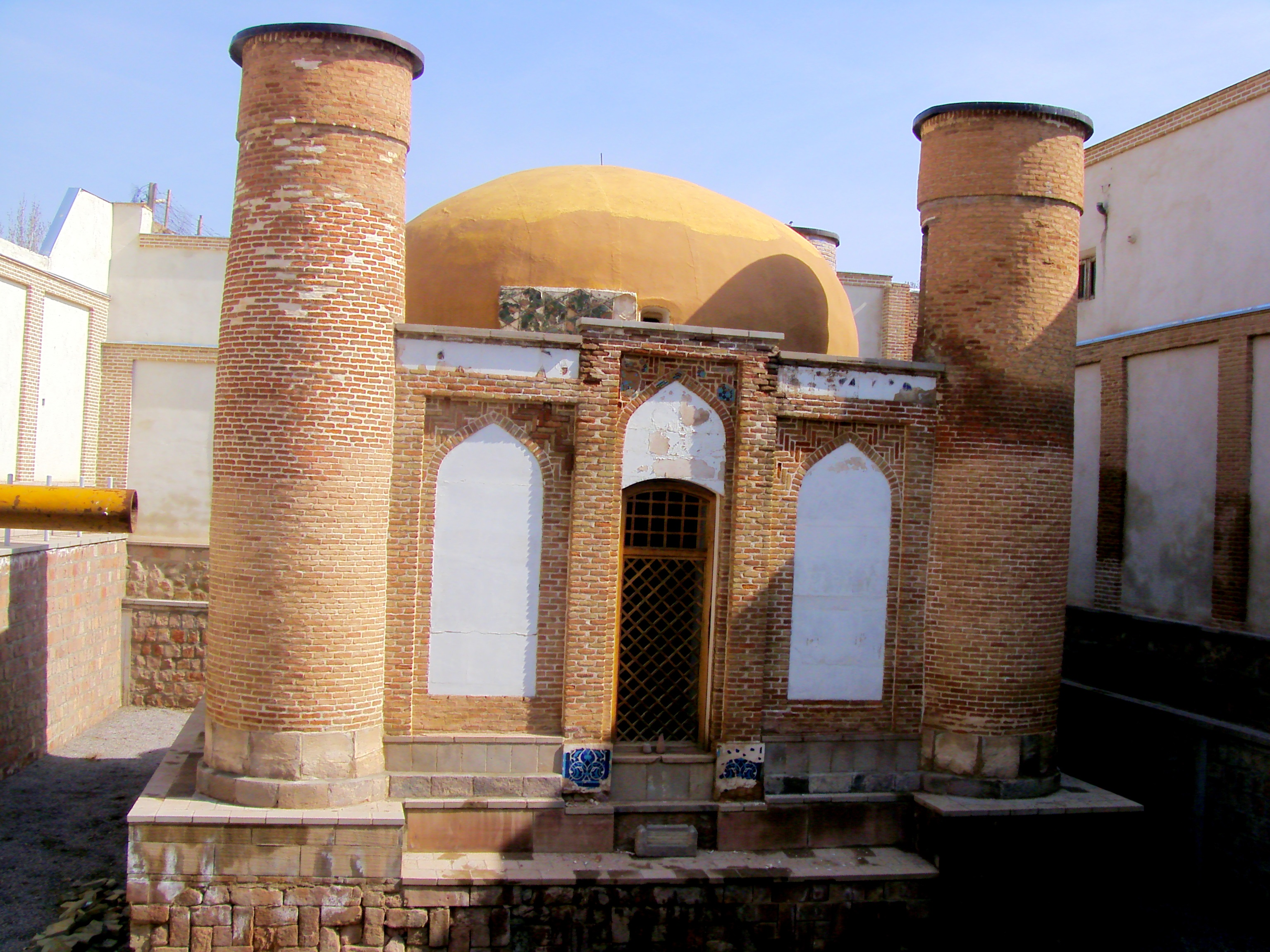

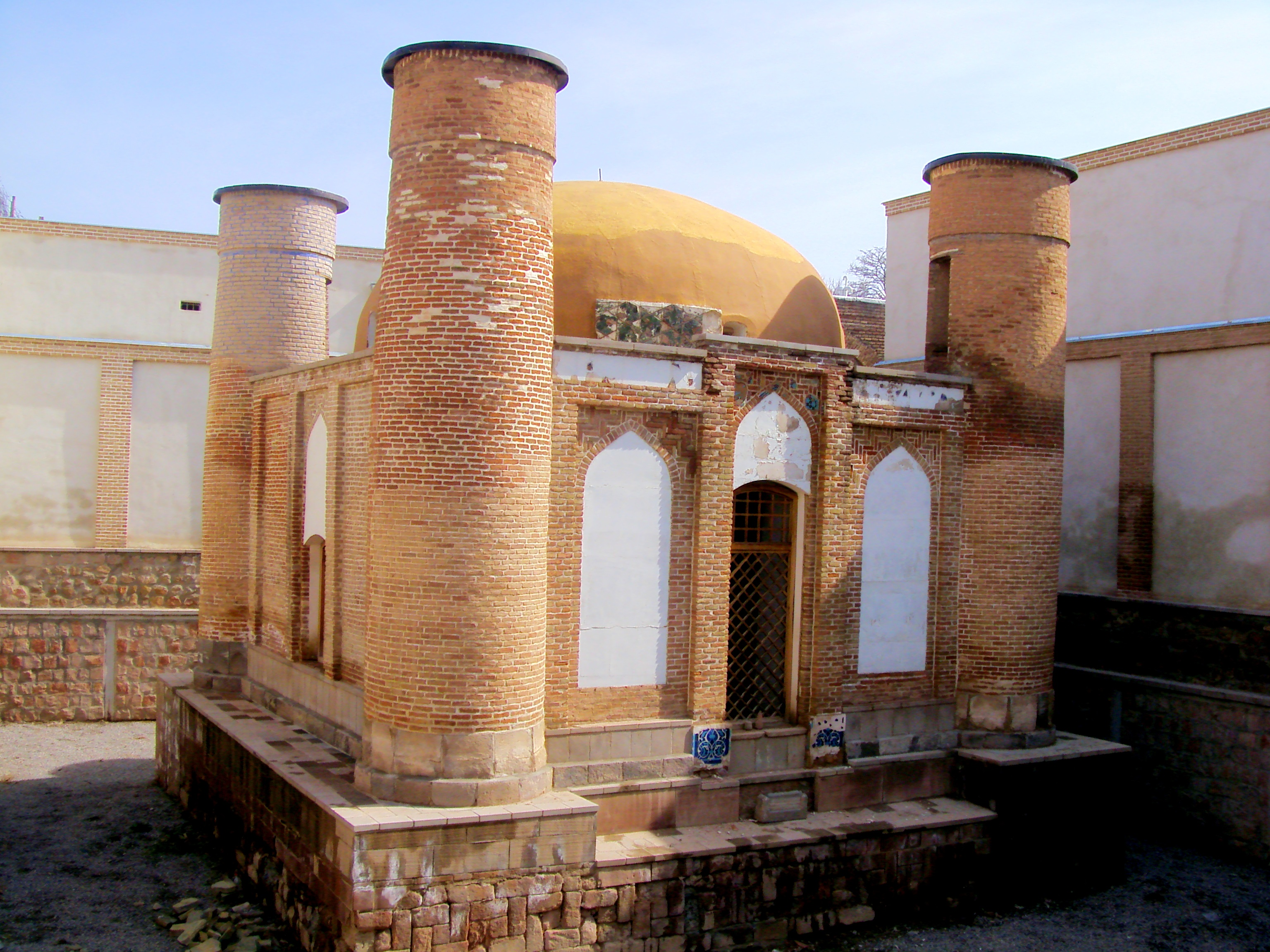

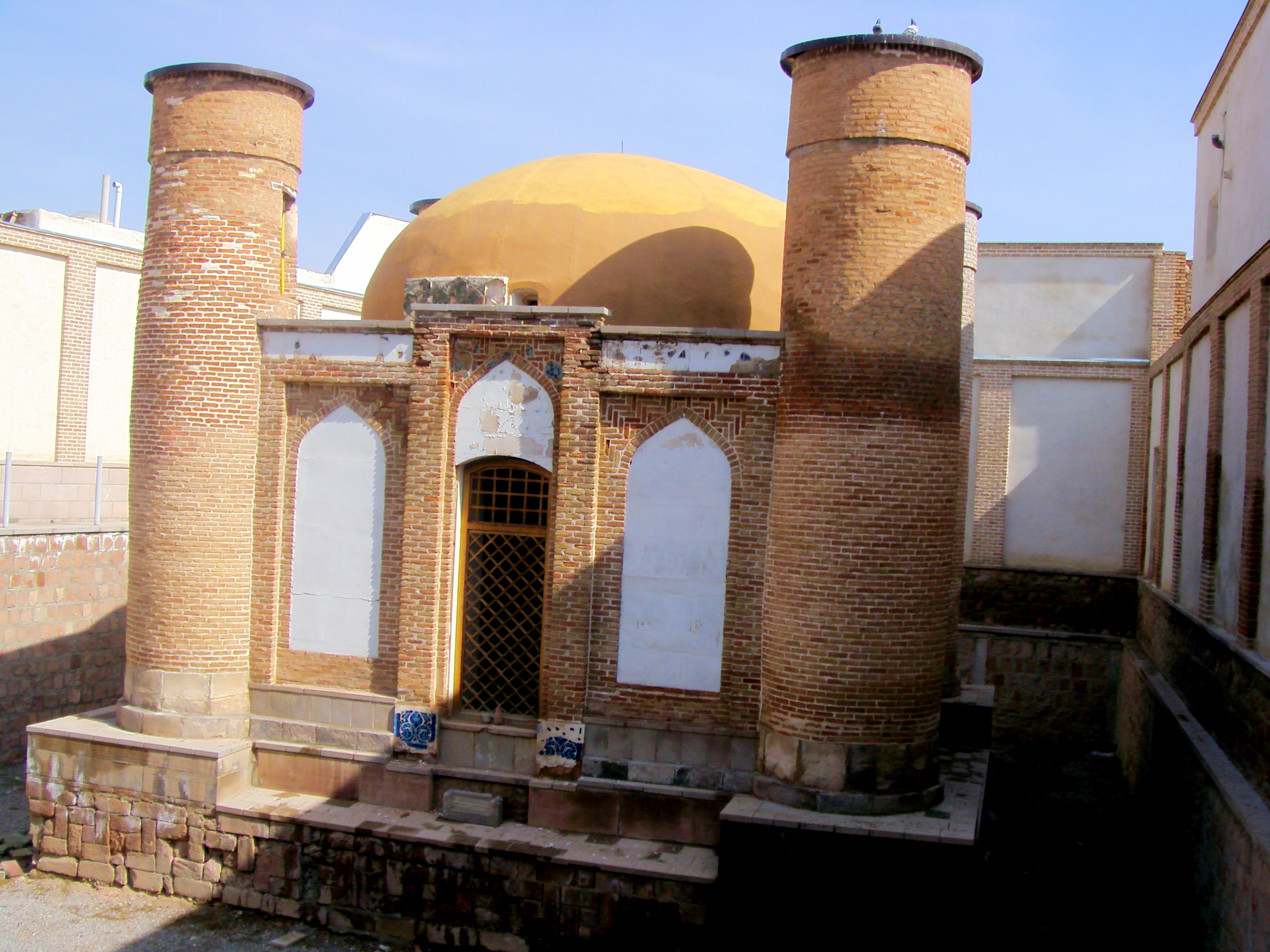

== See also ==
- List of Sunni Muslim dynasties
- List of Kurdish dynasties and countries

== Sources ==
- Bosworth, C.E. (1995). "Rawwādids". In Bosworth, C. E.; van Donzel, E.; Heinrichs, W. P. & Lecomte, G. (eds.). The Encyclopaedia of Islam, Second Edition. Volume VIII: Ned–Sam. Leiden: E. J. Brill. ISBN 978-90-04-09834-3.
- Bosworth, C.E. (1996). The New Islamic Dynasties: A Chronological and Genealogical Manual. New York City: Columbia University Press. ISBN 0-231-10714-5.
- de Blois, Francois (2004). Persian Literature - A Bio-Bibliographical Survey: Poetry of the Pre-Mongol Period (Volume V). Routledge. ISBN 978-0947593476.
- Dehghan, I. (1978). "Ḳaṭrān". In van Donzel, E.; Lewis, B.; Pellat, Ch. & Bosworth, C. E. (eds.). The Encyclopaedia of Islam, Second Edition. Volume IV: Iran–Kha. Leiden: E. J. Brill. ISBN 978-90-04-05745-6. OCLC 758278456.
- Frye, R. N. (2004). "IRAN v. PEOPLES OF IRAN (1) A General Survey". In Yarshater, Ehsan (ed.). Encyclopædia Iranica. Vol. XIII/3: Iran II. Iranian history–Iran V. Peoples of Iran. London and New York: Routledge & Kegan Paul. pp. 321–326. ISBN 978-0-933273-89-4.
- Lornejad, Siavash; Doostzadeh, Ali (2012). Arakelova, Victoria; Asatrian, Garnik (eds.). On the modern politicization of the Persian poet Nezami Ganjavi (PDF). Caucasian Centre for Iranian Studies. Archived from the original (PDF) on 4 April 2023.
- Madelung, Wilferd (1975). "Minor dynasties of northern Iran". In Frye, Richard N. (ed.). The Cambridge History of Iran: From the Arab Invasion to the Saljuqs. Vol. 4. Cambridge: Cambridge University Press. pp. 198–250. ISBN 0-521-20093-8.
- Peacock, Andrew (2017). "Rawwadids". Encyclopædia Iranica, online edition. New York.
- Rypka, Jan (1968). History of Iranian Literature. Springer Netherlands. ISBN 978-9401034814.
- Kennedy, Hugh (2016). The Prophet and the Age of the Caliphates. Routledge. ISBN 9781317376392.
- Bosworth, C. E. (1987). "AZERBAIJAN iv. Islamic History to 1941". In Yarshater, Ehsan (ed.). Encyclopædia Iranica. Vol. III: Ātaš–Bayhaqī, Ẓahīr-al-Dīn. London and New York: Routledge & Kegan Paul. pp. 224–231. ISBN 978-0-71009-121-5.
- Öpengin, Ergin (2021). Bozarslan, Hamit; Gunes, Cengiz; Yadirgi, Veli (eds.). The Cambridge History of the Kurds. Cambridge University Press.
