= Shiʿism (book) =

1943 book by Ahmad Kasravi critiquing Shia Islam

- Author: Ahmad Kasravi
- Audio read by: Qasim Qaradaghi
- Language: Persian
- Series: Read and judge
- Genre: Nonfiction, Religious criticism
- Published: 1943
- Publication place: Iran
- ISBN: 9780939214396
- Preceded by: Baháʼísm
- Followed by: varjavand bonyad

Shiʿism, (Note: Persian: شیعه‌گری, romanized: Shi'egari, pronounced [ʃiːˌʔeɡæˈɹiː]) also titled Read and Judge, (Note: بخوانند و داوری کنند, Bekhânand o dâvari konand, [ˈbexɒːnænd‿o‿dɑːvæˈɹiː ˈkonænd]) is a book written by Iranian intellectual Ahmad Kasravi as a critique of Shia Islam. Shiʿism is one of Kasravi's three books criticizing what he calls a bad religion. The book caused a great deal of controversy during Kasravi's lifetime, and even led him to court. Before the legal process could be completed and the verdict issued, Kasravi was stabbed to death by several members of the Shia fundamentalist group Fadaiyan-e-Islam led by Navvab Safavi, with the fatwa and support of Supreme Leader of Iran Ruhollah Khomeini. Shiʿism in its time was one of the first books to critique Shia Islam, and following this book, many authors criticized religion in Iran. Kasravi was one of the first thinkers and writers to express views on Shiʿism that are still debated.

== Contents ==
Kasravi has written his views based on sources from the period when first Alids movement was formed.

Kasravi considered the emergence of Shiʿism during the time of the Umayyad caliphs and considered the first contamination of the Shiite faith as their extremist slander of Abu Bakr, Omar and Uthman due to superiority over Ali in the caliphate. According to him, Ja'far al-Sadiq, the sixth Imam of Shias, was the first to coin the word Imam, and in order to obtain "khums" and "property of the Imam". Karvi considers the statement of the Shiite Imams that "no one knows the meaning of the Qur'an except us and whoever does not know should ask us" and "whoever does not know the Imam of his time has died without knowing it" as "extra and ridiculous words"; and he considers narrator (Imams) as abusive. He challenged the belief in the Twelve Imams and believed that the branch had done nothing but "spread blackmail and laziness and sponging."

Kasravi also considers the system of Imamate to be a rotten dictatorship "which is not mentioned anywhere in the Qur'an." Kasravi also criticizes Shiite prejudice, saying that "mullahs who have learned Islamic science, for example, are not as prejudiced against this religion as these fanatics."

== Publication ==
Kasravi published Shiʿism in February 1944. Following this, the clerics and fanatics of the Muslim people, as well as the religious leaders of the country, protested against its contents and filed a lawsuit against him in court, banning the distribution of the book. Kasravi did not give up and four months later, in order to justify his views in front of the people, he published the above book with more explanations and left it to the people to judge.

The audio book Shiʿism was recorded with the voice of Qasim Qaradaghi, and was published in 2015 by Avae Bof Publications, which lasts 5 hours and 40 minutes.
