= Zeyn al-Abedin Maraghei =

Persian novelist (1840–1910)

Zeyn al-Abedin Maraghei (Persian: زین‌العابدین مراغه‌ای; also Romanized as "Zeyn-al-’Ābedin Marāghe’i"; 1840 in Maragheh – 1910 in Istanbul) was a pioneer Iranian novelist and a social reformer. He is most known for the 1895 story of Travel Diary of Ebrahim Beg (sīyāhat nāmeh-ī Ebrāhīm-ī Beg). This work was critical in the development of novel writing in twentieth-century Iran, and played an important political role as well. The story was a criticism on Iran's political and social affairs. It was widely read in Iran and gained the interest of revolutionaries and reformers who made the Constitutional Revolution of 1906.

== Life ==
Maraghei was born into a Sunni Kurdish family of merchants who, although were initially followers of Shafi’i Sunni school, later became Shias. He received schooling until the age of sixteen and then joined his father’s trade and worked as a merchant. Facing troubles for agitating officials (of the kadkhuda and farash titles in particular), he left Iran for Tbilisi where he worked as a small merchant, at a time when Iranian workers were gradually moving to the city for work. He was eventually employed at the Iranian consulate, but the mismanagement caused him to leave. He then went to Russia and renounced his Iranian citizenship, which gave him a guilty conscience (he regained his Iranian citizenship later through a connection in Istanbul). Maraghei then took permanent residence in Istanbul where he became associated with Persian-language shams paper published in Istanbul and hablul matin published in Calcutta.

== Travel Diary of Ebrahim Beg ==
The main character in the Travel Diary of Ebrahim Beg resembles the author himself. Ebrahim too is a merchant who lives outside the country of his birth, but has a mental and spiritual preoccupation with his homeland, and above all, he wants it to change and reform. Ebrahim lives in Egypt where his father took residence many years ago, and has a reputation as an honest merchant. He loves Iran so much that he refuses to speak Arabic. The image of his homeland Iran is conceived utopically. His love for Iran motivates him to travel there; but, he is also motivated by his father’s will that instructs him to take time off from work and travel for several years recording his experiences. Before reaching Iran, Ebrahim is saddened when he sees miserable Iranians migrants doing the most difficult labor. His despair is only exacerbated when he reaches Iran. Ebrahim travels through many cities, and everyone suffers from the same problems: people are ignorant and self-centered; the clerics are deceitful, act for their own profit, and focus more on ritual purity than on the well-being of the nation; state officials (even in consulates abroad) take bribes, disregard the rule of law, assign jobs without regard for merit, and subordinate the nation’s interests to colonial concessions. Then, there are infrastructural problems: no institutions exist to address widespread opium use that even has currency among the ulema, clean water is hard to come by and there are not adequate schools and health facilities.

In Tehran, Ebrahim seeks to meet officials and explain to them the poor conditions of the country so that they may act. But, his eloquent descriptions are futile: officials become irritated and ask him to go away. Because of their response (or lack thereof), he puts his suggestions into writing. His reforms include respect for freedom and independence, the advancement of nation’s industries, promotion of culture, ending of colonial influence, and creation of a trade surplus.

== See also ==
- Mirza Abdul'Rahim Talibov Tabrizi
- Persian Constitutional Revolution
