= Abu Mansur Wahsudan =

Amir of Azerbaijan from the Kurdish Rawadid dynasty (11th century AD)

- Amir
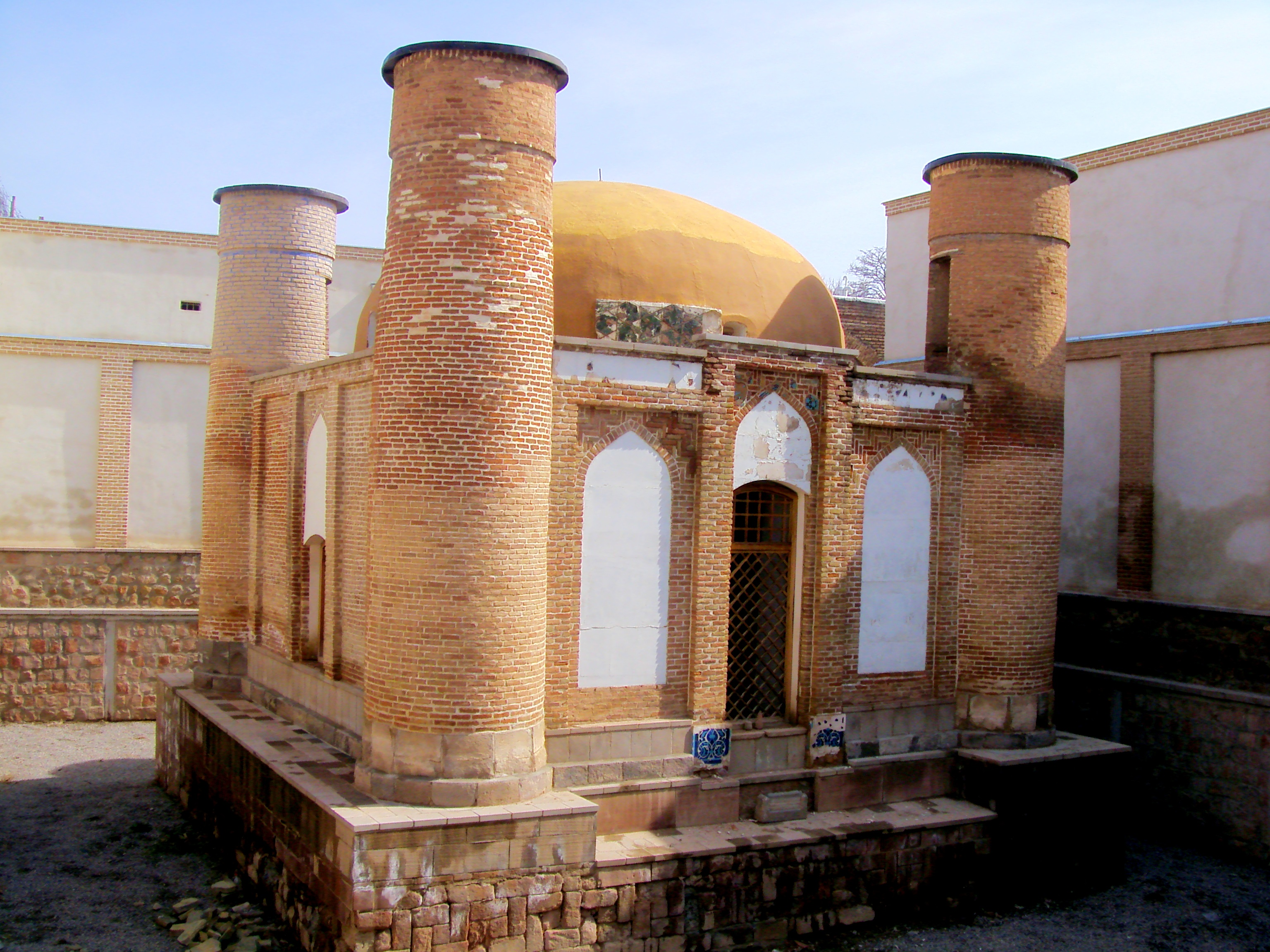
- The Imamzadeh Chaharmenar in Tabriz, where the Rawadid rulers are buried

Ruler of Azarbaijan
- Reign: 1025 (?) – 1058/59
- Predecessor: Abu Nasr Husayn II (?)
- Successor: Abu Nasr Mamlan II
- Died: 1059
- Issue: Abu Nasr Mamlan II; Abu'l-Hayja Manuchihr; Abu'l-Qasim Ibrahim
- Dynasty: Rawadids
- Father: Abu'l-Hayja Mamlan I

Abu Mansur Wahsudan (also spelled Vahsudan; Persian: ابو منصور وهسودان) was the penultimate Rawadid amir (ruler) of Azarbaijan from 1025 to 1058/59. He is considered the most prominent ruler of his dynasty. With the assistance of his Kurdish neighbours, he initially contained the attacks of migrating Turkmen tribes, but was eventually forced to acknowledge the authority of the Seljuk ruler Tughril (r. 1037–1063) in 1054. He was succeeded by his son Abu Nasr Mamlan II (r. 1058/59–1070).

== Background ==
Wahsudan was a son of the Rawadid amir (ruler) Abu'l-Hayja Mamlan I. Wahsudan's accession date and early reign are uncertain. According to the contemporary Armenian historian, Stephen of Taron, Abu'l-Hayja Mamlan I died in 988/89, however, he most likely confused him with another Abu'l-Hayja, who was from the Sallarid dynasty. The Ottoman historian Münejjim Bashi (d. 1702), who based his work on the now lost 12th century Ta'rikh al-Bab wa'l-Abwab, reports that Abu'l-Hayja Mamlan I died in 1001. However, coinage struck in the name of Muhammad ibn Husayn Rawad (another name of Abu'l-Hayja Mamlan I) appeared in 1002, 1009 and 1014, which indicates that he ruled for longer than reported. Another theory is that another ruler of the same name minted the coins. Münejjim Bashi further reports that Abu'l-Hayja Mamlan I was succeeded by his son Abu Nasr Husayn II, who ruled till his death in 1025. This likewise contradicts coin findings, with one struck in Wahsudan's name in 1016, which suggests that he became ruler between 1014 and 1016. The modern historian Andrew Peacock suggests that the Rawadid kingdom was divided between Wahsudan and Abu Nasr Husayn II, or that the latter's reign was short-lived. He adds Wahsudan may even have succeeded his father directly.

== Reign ==
Map of Azarbaijan and its surroundings

In contrast to the other relatively obscure Rawadid amirs, Wahsudan's reign is better attested because of the preservation of the sixty panegyric qasidas (a form of poetry) composed by the Persian poet Qatran Tabrizi. Nevertheless, details of his early reign are almost unknown. At an unspecified date, Wahsudan sent a large force led by his son Abu Nasr Mamlan, who was accompanied by Qatran, against the Ispahbadh of Mughan. The latter was defeated and forced to acknowledge Rawadid authority. Abu Nasr Mamlan subsequently built a fortress in the town of Ardabil.

It was during the reign of Wahsudan that Azarbaijan experienced incursions by migrating Turkmen tribes, known as the Iraqiya. Former followers of the Seljuk leader Arslan Isra'il, the Ghaznavids had driven them out of the eastern Iranian region of Khurasan, while their leader was imprisoned, dying in c. 1034. The first group of Iraqiya reached Azarbaijan in c. 1029, comprising around 2,000 tents. They were well received by Wahsudan, who made a marriage alliance with them to use them against his rivals, such as the Armenians. Wahsudan had an uneasy relationship with his sister's son Abu'l-Hayja ibn Rabib al-Dawla, who was the leader of the Hadhabani tribe, as well as the ruler of Urmia and the fortress of Barkari. In 1033/4, the Byzantine Empire captured the fortress at Wahsudan's urging. The Abbasid caliph al-Qa'im (r. 1031–1075) convinced the Rawadids to band together and recapture Barkari; they briefly reoccupied it until losing it permanently to the Byzantines. In 1037/38, a second and much stronger wave of Iraqiya led by the chiefs Buqa, Goktash, Mansur and Dana reached Azarbaijan. The Iraqiya soon began to plunder the country, sacking the city of Maragha in 1039.

In retaliation, Wahsudan and Abu'l-Hayja ibn Rabib al-Dawla defeated the Iraqiya, who were scattered into different groups which went to Ray, Isfahan and Hamadan. Regardless, the Iraqiya continued to pose a threat to the Rawadids, as Wahsudan invited them to a banquet where he massacred them and had forty of their leaders arrested in 1040/41. As a result, most of the Iraqiya subsequently withdrew to Hakkari. In 1041/42, another group of Iraqiya reached Azarbaijan from Ray, where they had fled from the Seljuk commander Ibrahim Inal. They engaged Wahsudan in a number of battles, including one near Sarab where they suffered a heavy defeat. Wahsudan ultimately expelled them.

The eviction of the Iraqiya from Azarbaijan allowed Wahsudan to improve his relations with the neighbouring Shaddadids, as he went to their capital of Ganja in person and visited their ruler Abu'l-Hasan Lashkari (r. 1034–1049). In 1042/43, an earthquake devastated much of the capital of Tabriz, including its citadel, walls, houses, markets and most of the Rawadid palace. The Persian poet Nasir Khusraw, who visited the city four years later, reports that 40,000 inhabitants died, but that the place still continued to prosper. The later historian Ibn al-Athir (died 1232/33) reports 50,000 casualties. Wahsudan only survived the incident as he was in a garden, probably outside the city. In 1044, around 5,000 Iraqiya arrived in Mesopotamia from Azarbaijan, where they seized the town of Khuy. Between 1048 and 1049, the area around Tabriz was devastated by the Turkmen chieftain Hasan, who was seemingly a nephew of the Seljuk ruler Tughril (r. 1037–1063). In 1054, Wahsudan was forced to submit to Tughril, who went to Tabriz in person. Tughril's name was placed in the khutba (Friday prayer), while a son of Wahsudan, possibly Abu'l-Hayja Manuchihr, was sent as a Seljuk hostage to Khurasan.

The circumstances of the transition of power between Wahsudan and his son Abu Nasr Mamlan are uncertain. According to Münejjim Bashi, Wahsudan died in 1059, but Ibn al-Athir reports that Abu Nasr Mamlan was recognised by Tughril as the ruler of Azarbaijan in 1058/59. Wahsudan also had a third son named Abu'l-Qasim Ibrahim, but nothing is known about him.

== Culture ==
The Rawwadids were promoters of Persian culture demonstrated by Wahsudan and Mamlan II's patronage of Qatran.

== Sources ==
- Bosworth, C.E. (1995). "Rawwādids". In Bosworth, C. E.; van Donzel, E.; Heinrichs, W. P. & Lecomte, G. (eds.). The Encyclopaedia of Islam, Second Edition. Volume VIII: Ned–Sam. Leiden: E. J. Brill. ISBN 978-90-04-09834-3.
- Bosworth, C.E. (1996). The New Islamic Dynasties: A Chronological and Genealogical Manual. New York City: Columbia University Press. ISBN 0-231-10714-5.
- Dehghan, I. (1978). "Ḳaṭrān". In van Donzel, E.; Lewis, B.; Pellat, Ch. & Bosworth, C. E. (eds.). The Encyclopaedia of Islam, Second Edition. Volume IV: Iran–Kha. Leiden: E. J. Brill. ISBN 978-90-04-05745-6. OCLC 758278456.
- Madelung, Wilferd (1975). "Minor dynasties of northern Iran". In Frye, Richard N. (ed.). The Cambridge History of Iran: From the Arab Invasion to the Saljuqs. Vol. 4. Cambridge: Cambridge University Press. pp. 198–250. ISBN 0-521-20093-8.
- Minorsky, Vladimir (October 1954). "A Mongol Decree of 720/1320 to the Family of Shaykh Zāhid". Bulletin of the School of Oriental and African Studies. 16 (3). London: SOAS, University of London: 515–527. doi:10.1017/S0041977X00086821. JSTOR 608620. S2CID 159901706.
- Peacock, Andrew (2017). "Rawwadids". Encyclopædia Iranica, online edition. New York.

Abu Mansur Wahsudan Rawadid dynasty
Preceded by Abu Nasr Husayn II	Ruler of Azarbaijan; 1025 (?) – 1058/59	Succeeded by Abu Nasr Mamlan II
