= Alavian Dam =

Dam in East Azerbaijan, Iran

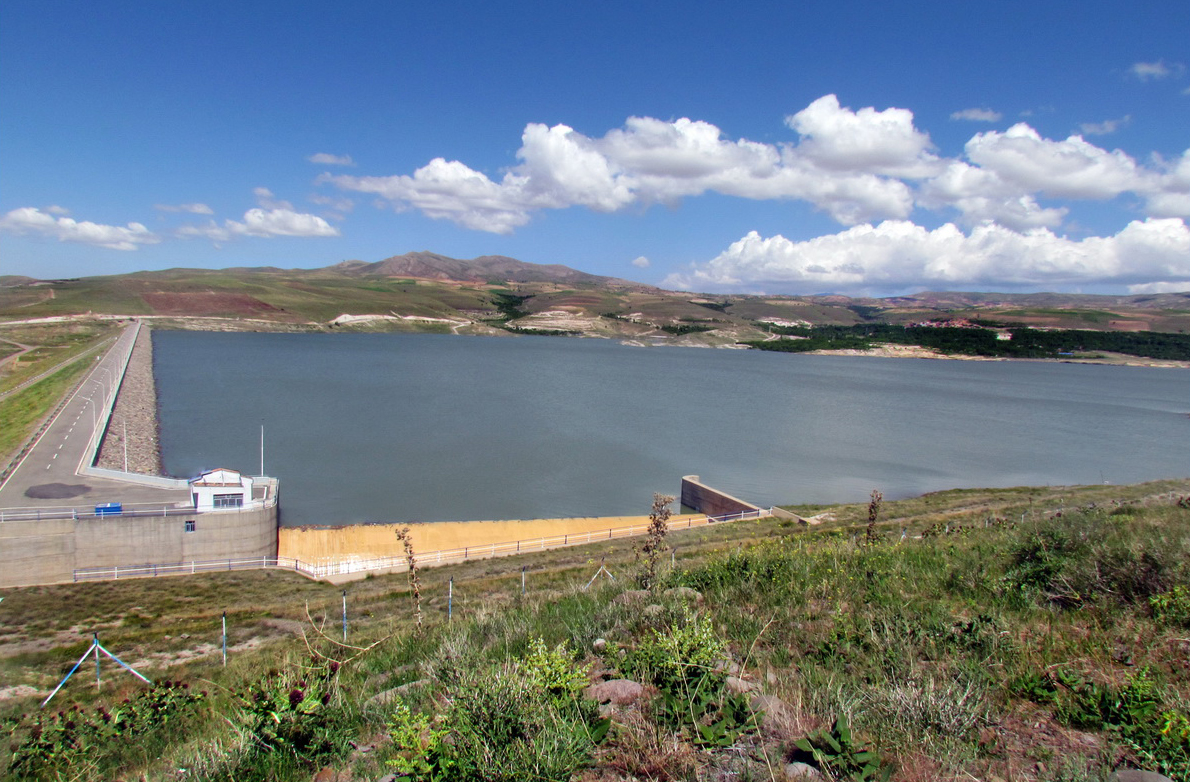
- A view of Alavian Dam

- Location within Iran
- Interactive map of Alavian Dam
- Country: Iran
- Location: Maraqeh
- Coordinates: 37.43667°N 46.25639°E
- Purpose: Irrigation, Water supply
- Status: Operational
- Construction began: 1990
- Opening date: 1996
- Owner: Regional Water Company of East Azarbaijan

Dam and spillways
- Type of dam: Embankment, earth-fill
- Impounds: Sufi Chay river
- Height (foundation): 76 m (249 ft)
- Height (thalweg): 70 m (230 ft)
- Length: 935 m (3,068 ft)
- Width (crest): 10 m (33 ft)
- Width (base): 410 m (1,345 ft)
- Dam volume: 4,769,000 m^{3} (6,237,617 cu yd)
- Spillway type: Side Channel Spillway
- Spillway capacity: 1,180 m^{3}/s (42,000 cu ft/s)

Reservoir
- Total capacity: 60,000,000 m^{3} (48,643 acre⋅ft)
- Active capacity: 57,000,000 m^{3} (46,211 acre⋅ft)
- Surface area: 262 ha (647 acres)
- Normal elevation: 1,568 m (5,144 ft)
- Website http://www.azarwater.ir/

The Alavian Dam and Lake (Persian: سد علویان) is situated on the Sufi Chay river in East Azerbaijan Province, northwestern Iran. It is located about 3 kilometres north of Maraqeh. It is an earth-fill embankment dam with a height of 76 metres and was built between 1990 and 1995; opening on January 1, 1996. The dam serves to provide flood control and water supply for municipal and irrigation uses. After construction, it was noticed that the dam had settled five times more than expected. The settlement of the dam and its gallery, below the body, had unexpected differences as well. This led to "considerable" leakage in the gallery.

== See also ==
- Dams in Iran
