= Yayshahr =

Yayshahr ياي شهر
- Village
- Location within Iran
- Coordinates: 37°34′03″N 46°20′15″E
- Country: Iran
- Province: East Azerbaijan
- County: Maragheh
- Bakhsh: Central
- Rural District: Sarajuy-ye Gharbi

Population (2006)
  - Total: 327
- Time zone: UTC+3:30 (IRST)
  - Summer (DST): UTC+4:30 (IRDT)

Yayshahr (Persian: ياي شهر, also Romanized as Yāyshahr; also known as Yarīshahr and Yāyshahrī) is a village in Sarajuy-ye Gharbi Rural District, in the Central District of Maragheh County, East Azerbaijan Province, Iran. At the 2006 census, its population was 327, in 77 families. The name "Yayshahr" is derived from the Turkic languages and means "summer town". The village is located 16 km north of the city of Maragheh on the slopes of Mount Sahand. Vladimir Minorsky tentatively identified Yayshahr with the historical castle of Ru'in Dez, which was the main residence of the Ahmadili atabegs of Maragheh in the 1100s and early 1200s. He also suggested a possible identification with the ancient fortress of Vera (Greek: Οὔερα) which the Roman emperor Antonius besieged during his campaign against the Parthian Empire.
