= Ru'in Dez =

Historical Iranian site

Rū'īn Dez, sometimes also called just Rū'īn, was a fortress near Maragheh in Iran that served as the main dynastic stronghold and residence of the Ahmadili Atabegs of Maragheh in the 1100s and early 1200s. Vladimir Minorsky tentatively located it at present-day Yayshahr, 16 km north of Maragheh on the slopes of Mount Sahand. In 1174/5 (570 AH), the Eldiguzid ruler Muhammad Jahan Pahlavan besieged Ru'in Dez and then Maragheh, each time unsuccessfully. In 1197, when the poet Nizami Ganjavi completed his Haft Peykar, he sent it to his patron, the Ahmadili atabeg Ala ad-Din, who received it at Ru'in Dez. After Ala ad-Din died in 1207 or 1208 (604 AH) and then his young son died a year later, the Eldiguzid atabeg Abu Bakr invaded Ahmadili territory. A eunuch who stayed loyal to the Ahmadili family took up a defensive position at Ru'in Dez with Sulafa Khatun, Ala ad-Din's granddaughter, along with the dynastic treasury. Ru'in Dez was the only Ahmadili possession that did not come under Abu Bakr's control. Sulafa Khatun remained in charge at Ru'in Dez after the Mongols took Maragheh itself in 1220 or 1221 (617 AH). Her reign came to an end after a siege of Ru'in Dez by the Khwarazmshah vizier Sharaf al-Molk when Jalal al-Din Mangburni arrived, made her marry him, and installed a new governor at Ru'in Dez.
