= Awhadi Maraghai =

Persian Sufi poet (1274/5–1338)

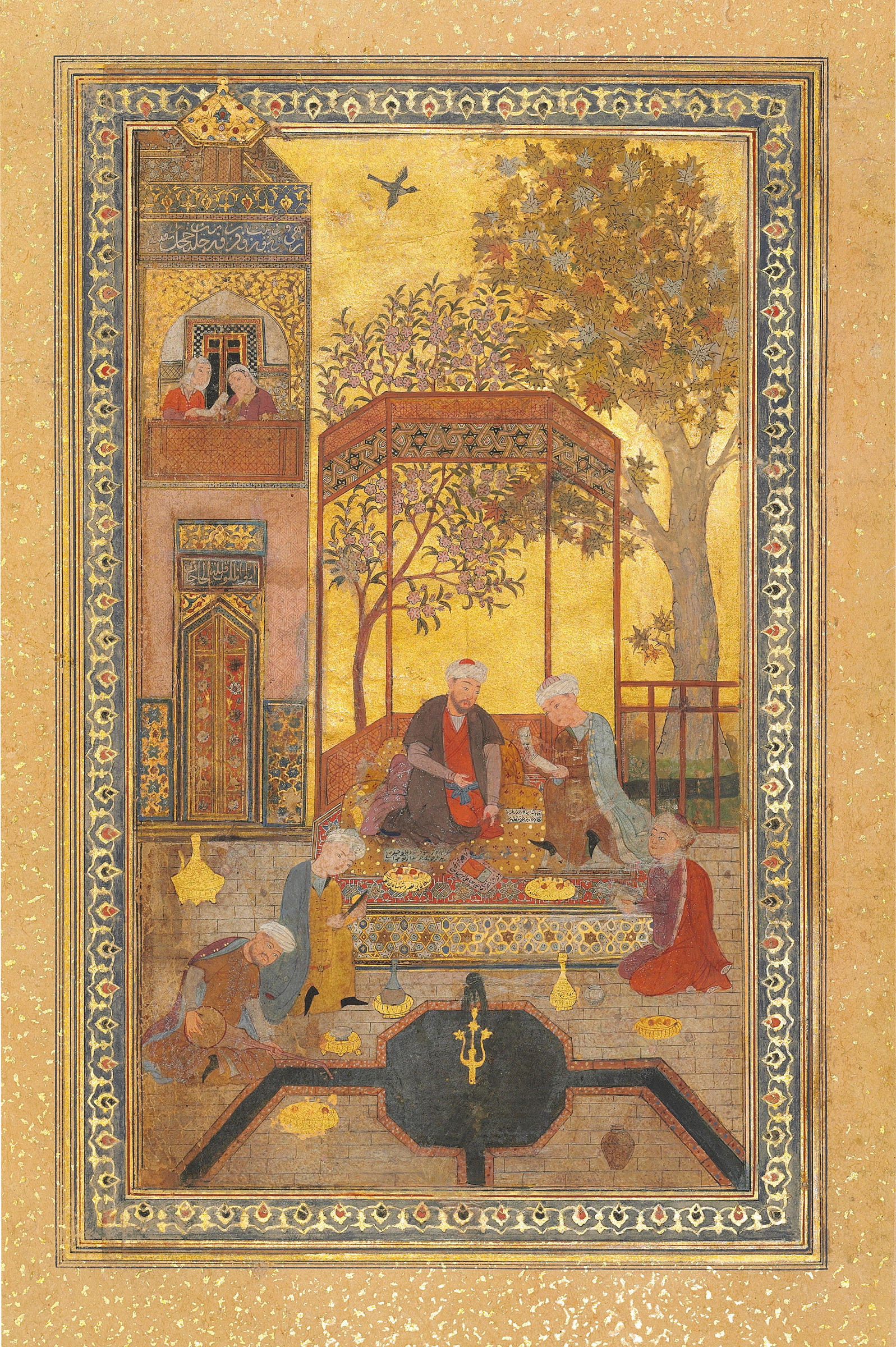
- Folio of a copy of Awhadi Maraghai's Jam-i Jam, signed by Kamal ud-Din Behzad, Timurid Herat, dated 1459/60
- Native name: اوحدی مراغه‌ای
- Born: 1274/75 Isfahan, Ilkhanate
- Died: 6 April 1338 Maragha, Jalayirid Sultanate
- Notable works: Divan of Awhadi Maraghai; Mathnawi-yi Jam-i jam

Awhadi Maraghei (also spelled Auhadi; Persian: اوحدی مراغه‌ای) (1274/75–1338) was a Persian Sufi poet primarily based in Azerbaijan during the rule of the Mongol Ilkhanate.

He is usually surnamed "Maraghai", but also mentioned as Awhadi Esfahani because his father hailed from Isfahan and he himself spent part of his life there. He first chose the pen-name Safi, but changed it to Awhadi after becoming a devotee of the school of the famous mystic Awhad al-Din Kermani.

== Life ==
His full name was Awhad al-Din (or Rukn al-Din) ibn Husayn Isfahani. According to a verse in his Mathnawi-yi Jam-i jam, Awhadi was born in the city of Isfahan in c. 1274. He most likely lived there until his later teens. At the start of the 1290s, Awhadi went on a long trip, visiting various places, such as Basra, Baghdad, Damascus, Sultaniyya, Karbala, Kufa, Najaf, Qum and Hamadan. He also briefly lived in Mecca. In c. 1306, Awhadi permanently settled in Maragha, but would also regularly visit Tabriz to the north, which was a day's travel. He died on 6 April 1338 at Maragha, where he is buried.

== Work ==
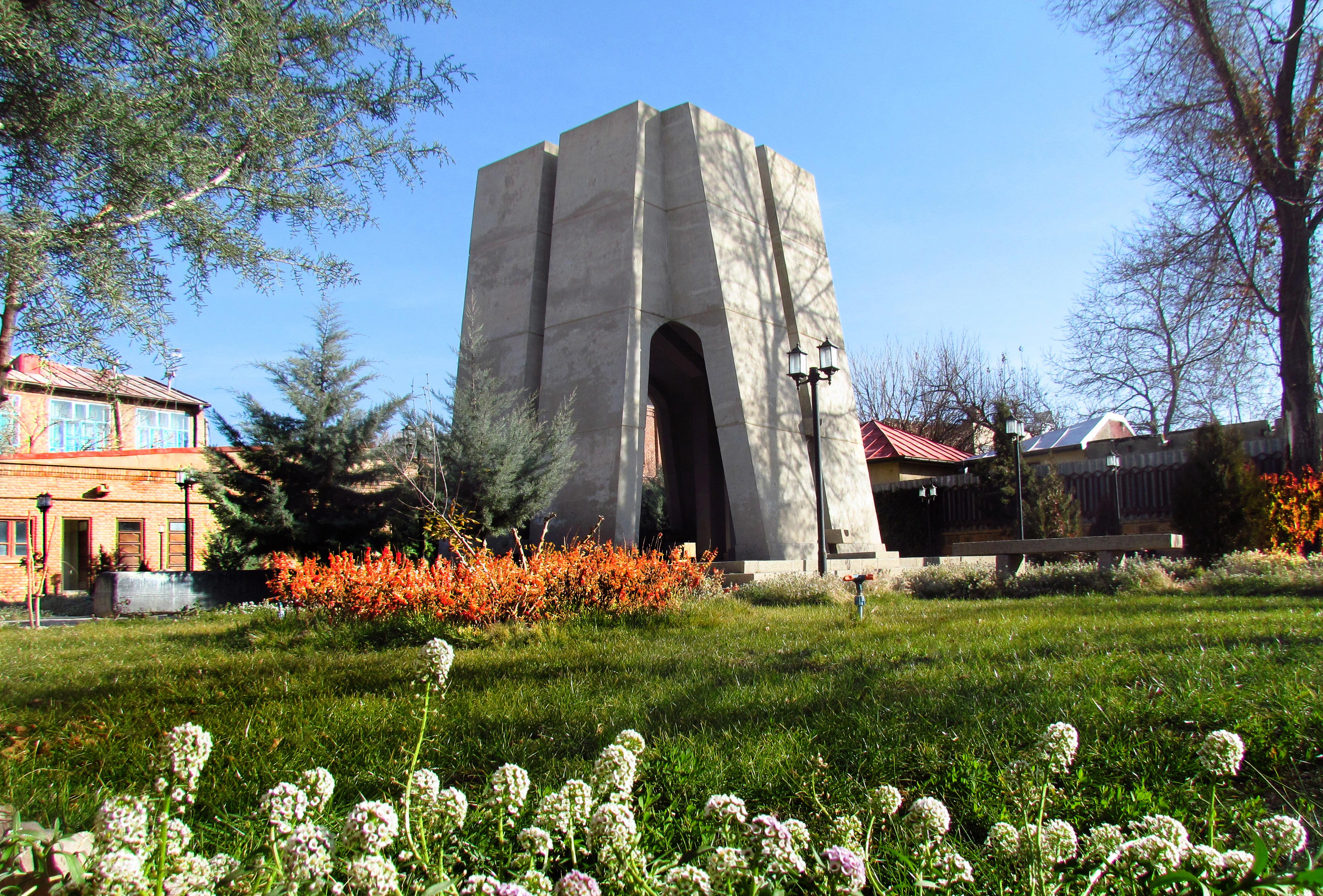
Recent tomb of Awhadi, Maragha

Awhadi has a divan of 8000 verses which consists of the Persian poetic forms qasidas, ghazals, tarji'bands and rubaʿis. The qasidas are in praise of Abu Sa'id Bahadur Khan and his vizier, Ghiyath al-Din Muhammad, the son of Rashid al-Din Hamadani. His other poems play on various themes including mysticism, ethics, and religious subjects. He also is known for his marsiyas (elegies).

In addition to his divan of shorter poems, he has left two important Persian works in Masnavi form. The Dah-nama or Manteq al-Oshaaq consists of 600 verses and was completed in 1307 for Wajih Al-din Yusef, the grandson of the famous Nasir al-Din Tusi. His most important and well known work was the Masnavi Jām-i Jam ("The Cup of Jamshid") also called Jām-e-Jahānbīn ("The mirror of the universe"). It was written in 1333 and has 5000 verses and follows the style of Sanai's Hadiqah.

Sample quotes from Jām-i Jam:

- «پایداری به عدل و داد بود// ظلم و شاهی، چراغ و باد بود»
- «خاك از ایشان چگونه مشك شود// گر به دریا روند خشك شـود»
- «خواب را گفته‌ای برادر مرگ// چو بخسبی همی زنی درِ مرگ»
- «دزد را شحنه راه و رخت نمود// کشتن دزد بی‌گناه چه سود؟// دزد با شحنه چون شریک بود// کوچه‌ها را عسس چریک بود»
- «نفس خود را بكش نبرد اين است// منتهای كمال مرد این است»

Ali Karamustafa notes in Der Islam, narrating about perceptions of Turkomans in Iran and the lands further west in the 12th to 14th centuries, that Awhadi Maraghai considered Turkomans to be "unthinking (bī-fekr) and naïve country bumpkins easily fooled by thieves."

== Fahlavi Poem ==
Awhad Maraghai has three ghazals in the Fahlavi dialect of Isfahan, arranged under the title of "in the language of Isfahan".

== Sources ==
- Khaleghi-Motlagh, Dj. (1987). "Awḥadī Marāḡaʾī". In Yarshater, Ehsan (ed.). Encyclopædia Iranica. Vol. III/2: Awāʾel al-maqālāt–Azerbaijan IV. London and New York: Routledge & Kegan Paul. p. 119. ISBN 978-0-71009-114-7.
- Lewisohn, Leonard (2011). "Awḥadī Marāghaʾī". In Fleet, Kate; Krämer, Gudrun; Matringe, Denis; Nawas, John; Rowson, Everett (eds.). Encyclopaedia of Islam (3rd ed.). Brill Online. doi:10.1163/1573-3912_ei3_COM_30552. ISSN 1873-9830.
- Rypka, Jan (1968). History of Iranian Literature. Springer Netherlands. ISBN 978-9401034814.
- Tafazzoli, Ahmad (1999). "Fahlavīyāt". In Yarshater, Ehsan (ed.). Encyclopædia Iranica. Vol. IX/2: Excavations IV–Fārābī V. Music. London and New York: Routledge & Kegan Paul. pp. 158–162. ISBN 978-0-933273-27-6.
