= Leonard Lewisohn =

Leonard Lewisohn may refer to:

- Leonard Lewisohn (philanthropist) (1847–1902), American merchant and philanthropist
- Leonard Lewisohn (Islamic studies scholar) (1953–2018), American author, translator and lecturer
