= Gonbad-e Sorkh, Maragheh =

Iranian national heritage site

Coordinates: 37°22′53.42″N 46°14′25.53″E

Gonbad-e Sorkh
- گنبد سرخ (Persian)
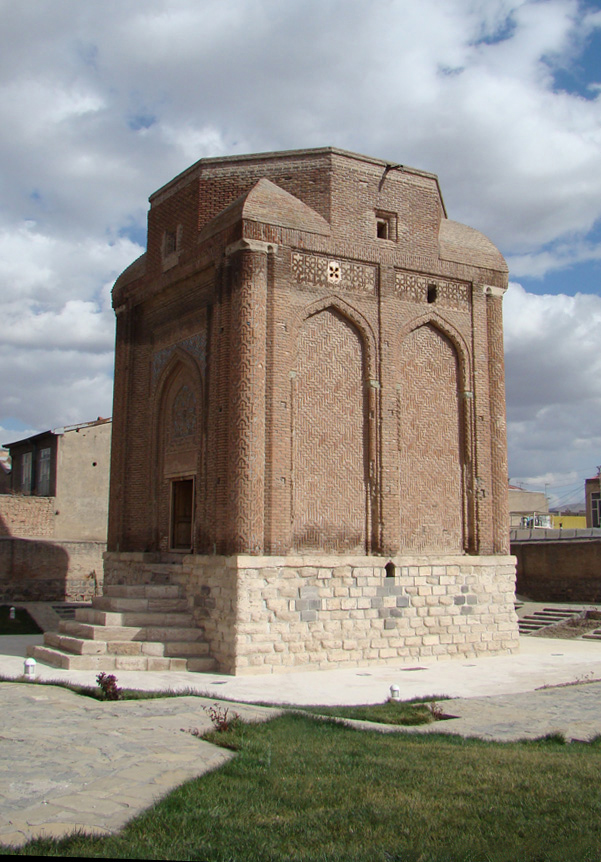

- Location of Gonbad-e Sorkh in Iran
- Type: Dome, Observatory
- Etymology: The Red Dome
- Location: Maragheh, Maragheh County, East Azerbaijan province, Iran
- Nearest city: Maragheh

History
- Founder: Abdul Aziz Ibn Mahmoud Ibn Saad Yadim
- Built: 1147 AD (542 AH)
- Built for: Seljuk dynasty

Site notes
- Height: About 10 meters
- Area: A square with dimensions of 8.4 meters from outside and 5.95 meters from inside
- Architect: Bani Bakr Mohammad Ibn Bandan Ibn Mohsen Memar
- Architectural style: Razi style
- Governing body: Government of Iran

Iran National Heritage List
- Official name: Red Tower
- Type: Funerary Tower
- Designated: 1932
- Reference no.: 134
- Conservation organization: Cultural Heritage, Handicrafts and Tourism Organization of Iran

The Gonbad-e Sorkh (Persian: گنبد سرخ, lit. 'The Red Dome') is the name of a historic building in Maragheh, Iran, built in 1147 AD (542 AH) in the Seljuk era. The architectural style of this building is Razi style. The Gonbad-e Sorkh is one of the oldest buildings of the Islamic period in the East Azerbaijan province, which is located in the southwestern part of the city of Maragheh and it is one of the most important historical monuments of this city. The name of the founder of the building and the date of its construction can be seen from the inscription of the northern front and the name of its builder can be seen from the western inscription.

== History ==
The Gonbad-e Sorkh has seven inscriptions. From the inscriptions in this building, it is understood that the building of the Gonbad-e Sorkh (Red Dome) was built in 1147 AD (542 AH) by the order of "Abdul Aziz Ibn Mahmoud Ibn Saad Yadim", the president of Azerbaijan during the Seljuk era, and designed by "Bani Bakr Mohammad Ibn Bandan Ibn Mohsen Memar".

Cultural heritage experts believe that this building was used before the Maragheh observatory to determine the months of the year and the hours of the day, and the holes created on the sides of this building indicate this. The building was registered as one of the Iran National Heritage on 6 January 1932 with the registration number 134.

The Gonbad-e Sorkh is the oldest of the five tombs in Maragheh, and despite the existence of legible inscriptions, it is not clear who owns the tomb under the dome.

== Architecture ==
The Gonbad-e Sorkh is the last building constructed in the Razi style in Iranian architectural history. Razi style is a style in Iranian architecture and is related to the fifth to the beginning of the seventh Hijri lunar century (Samanid Empire, Seljuk Empire and Khwarazmian Empire). The building also has some Azeri architecture theme so it is the turning point and the beginning of Azeri architecture, which is a combination of bricks and tiles and the use of tiles in decorating historical buildings in Iran.

The Gonbad-e Sorkh is a square building with 2 floors consisting of a crypt and a main room which is located on a stone platform and can be accessed by seven rows of stairs. The height of seven steps from the surrounding area is about 1.50 meters. Five steps are located in front of the platform and the sixth and seventh steps are part of the gate threshold. The crypt is located in the middle of the platform and can be accessed from the eastern front. The tombstone is in the crypt. The entrance to the Gonbad-e Sorkh, which faces north, consists of a tall and beautiful gate adorned with delicate brickwork and delicate turquoise tiles, which had just become common in Seljuk architecture. In the center of this brickwork is an inscription in Kufic script. In the four outer corners of the building, there are circular columns with brick decorations that help the building stand. The substructure is made of cut stone.

This dome has 4 sides as a square with dimensions of 8.4 meters from outside and 5.95 meters from inside and its height is about 10 meters, the inscription on the north side indicates the name and titles of the founder of the dome and the date of construction of the building, and the inscription on the east and south sides contain the Quranic verses and the west side indicate the name of the architect. This building has a two-covered dome, the outer pyramidal cover of which has collapsed and only the inner dome remains. Therefore, it can be considered as a memorial tower. According to German orientalist Eric Schurder, the building is a masterpiece of world architecture in terms of brickwork.

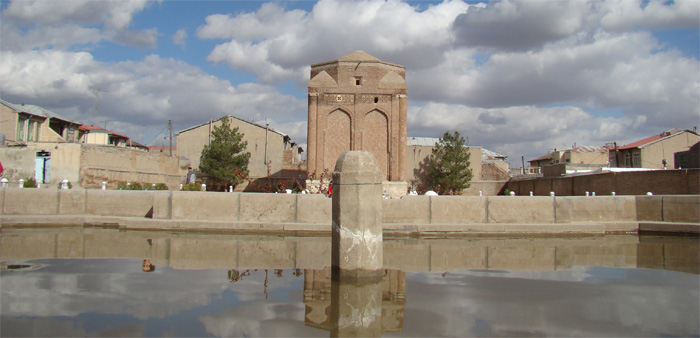
Perspective of the Gonbad-e Sorkh

== Gallery ==
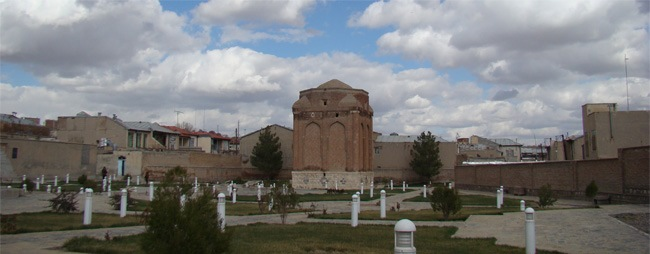
Front view

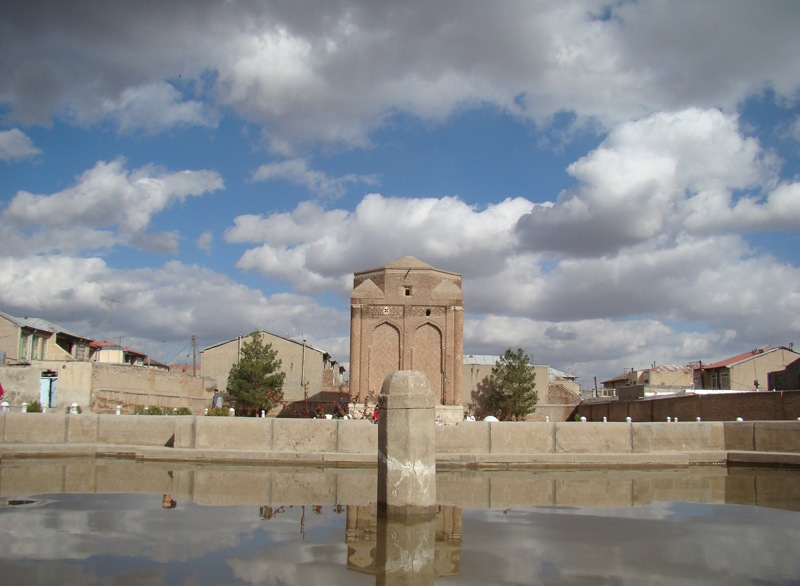
Back view

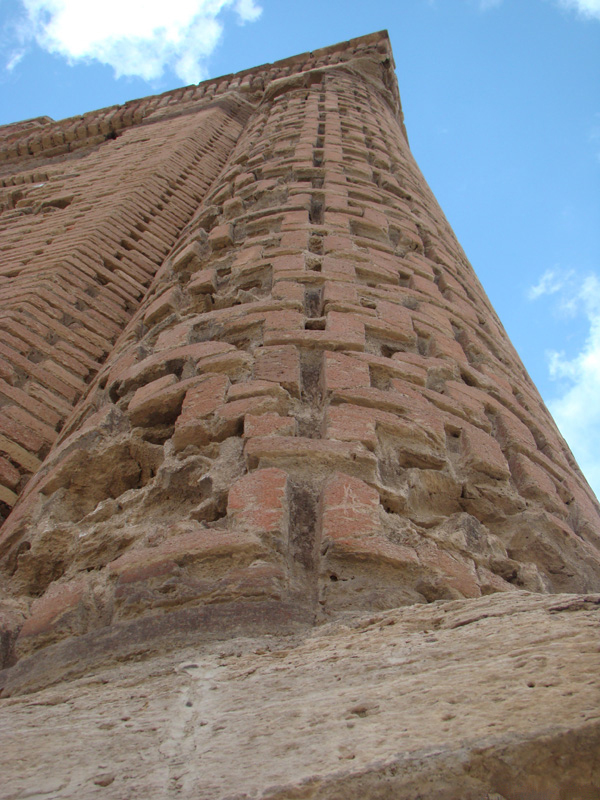
The column of the dome

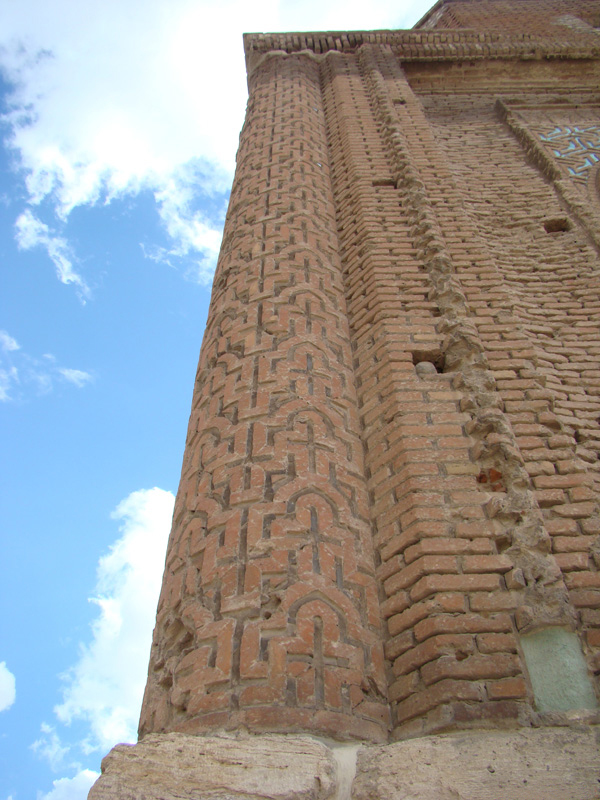
The column of the dome

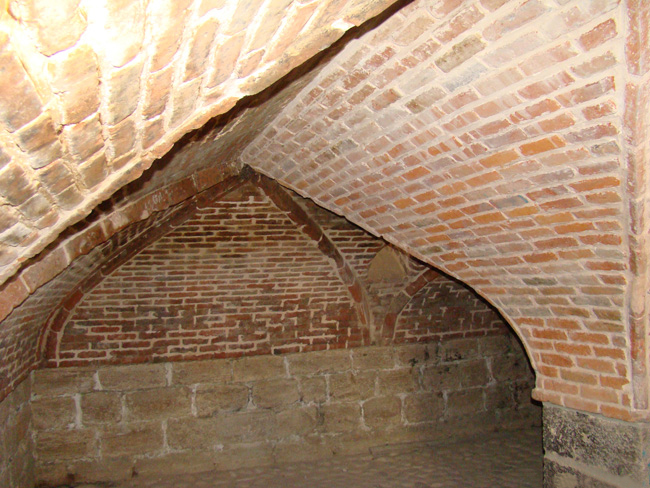
The crypt of the dome

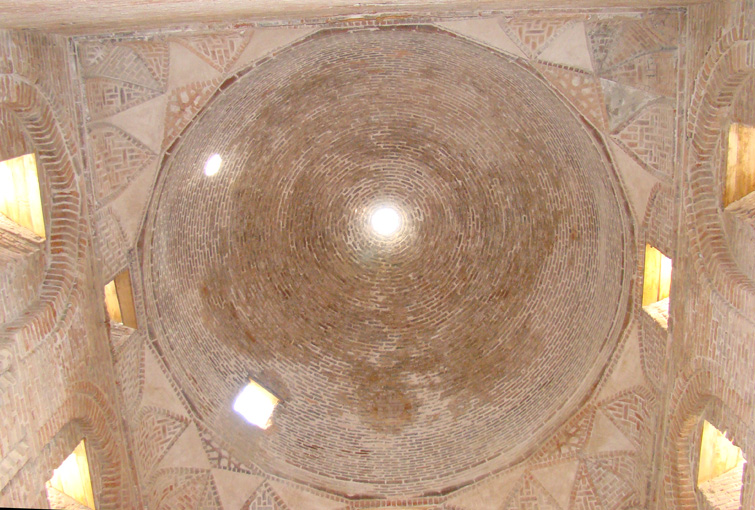
The dome roof

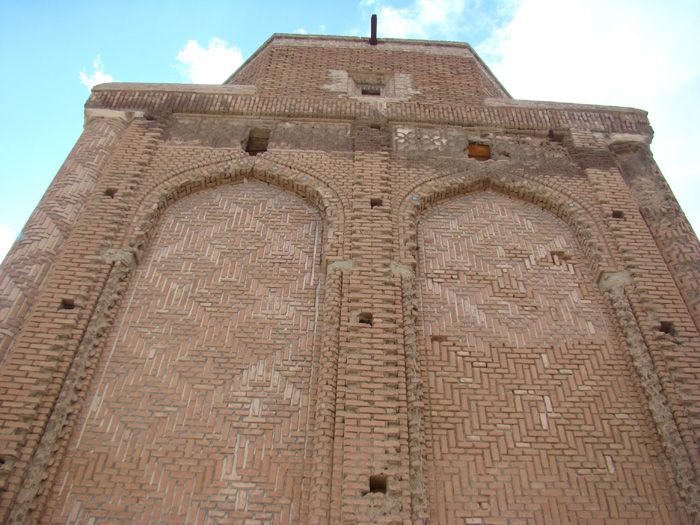
The dome brickwork

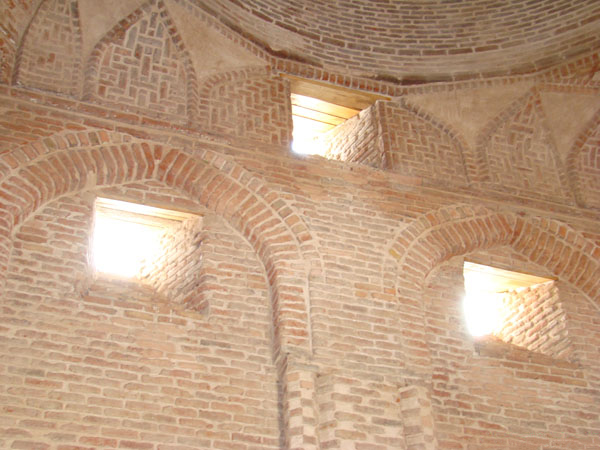
The observatory holes

== Bibliography ==
In Persian:

- مروارید، یونس. مراغه (افرازه رود). تهران (ویرایش دوم): نشر، ۱۳۷۰.
- صدرالاسلامی، فخرالدین. دیدنی‌های مراغه و عجب شیر. تهران: نشر، ۱۳۸۱.

== See also ==
- Maragheh observatory
- Babak Fort
- Sa'at Tower
