= Bulud Qarachorlu =

Iranian Azerbaijani-language poet

Bulud Gharachorlou
- بولود قاراچورلو
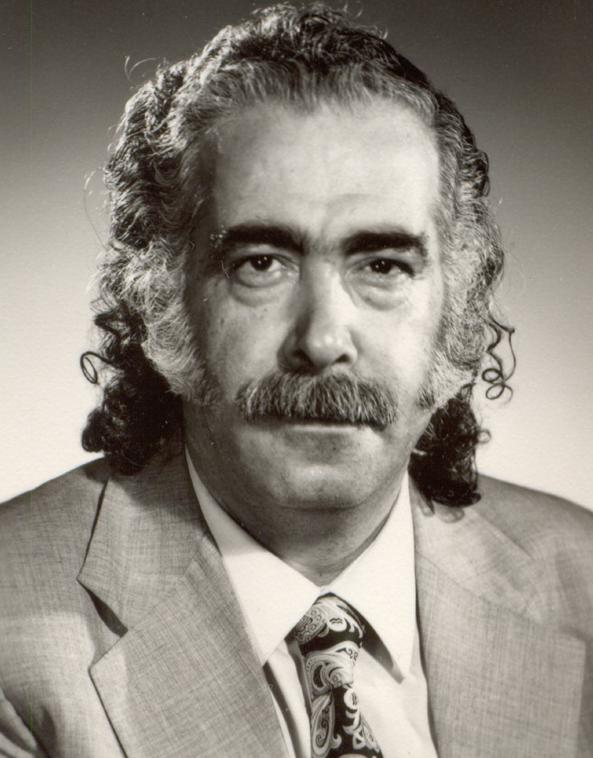
- Born: 1926; Maragheh, Eastern Azerbaijan
- Died: 1979 (aged 52–53); Tehran, Iran
- Occupation: Poet
- Children: 7
- Writing career
- Pen name: Sahand

Bulud Gharachorlou (Persian: بولود قاراچورلو, South Azerbaijani: بولود قراچورلو; born 1926 in Maragheh, Eastern Azerbaijan — died 1979 in Tehran), mainly known by his pen name, Sahand (سهند), was an Iranian poet of Iranian Azerbaijani origin, he wrote in the South Azerbaijani language.

== Works ==
- Sazimin Sözü
- poem of Araz
- poem of Khatirah

== Notes ==
- Bulud Gharaçurlu Səhənd. "Dədəmin kitabı". Stockholm, 2006.
- Parvana Mammadli. "Azerbaijan matbuat tarixi". Baku, 2010.
- Fikrət Süleymanoğlu. Səhənd: mühiti, həyatı və yaradıcılığı (monoqrafiya). Bakı: Nurlar NPO, – 2017. – 176 s.
