= Sufi Chay =

River in Iran

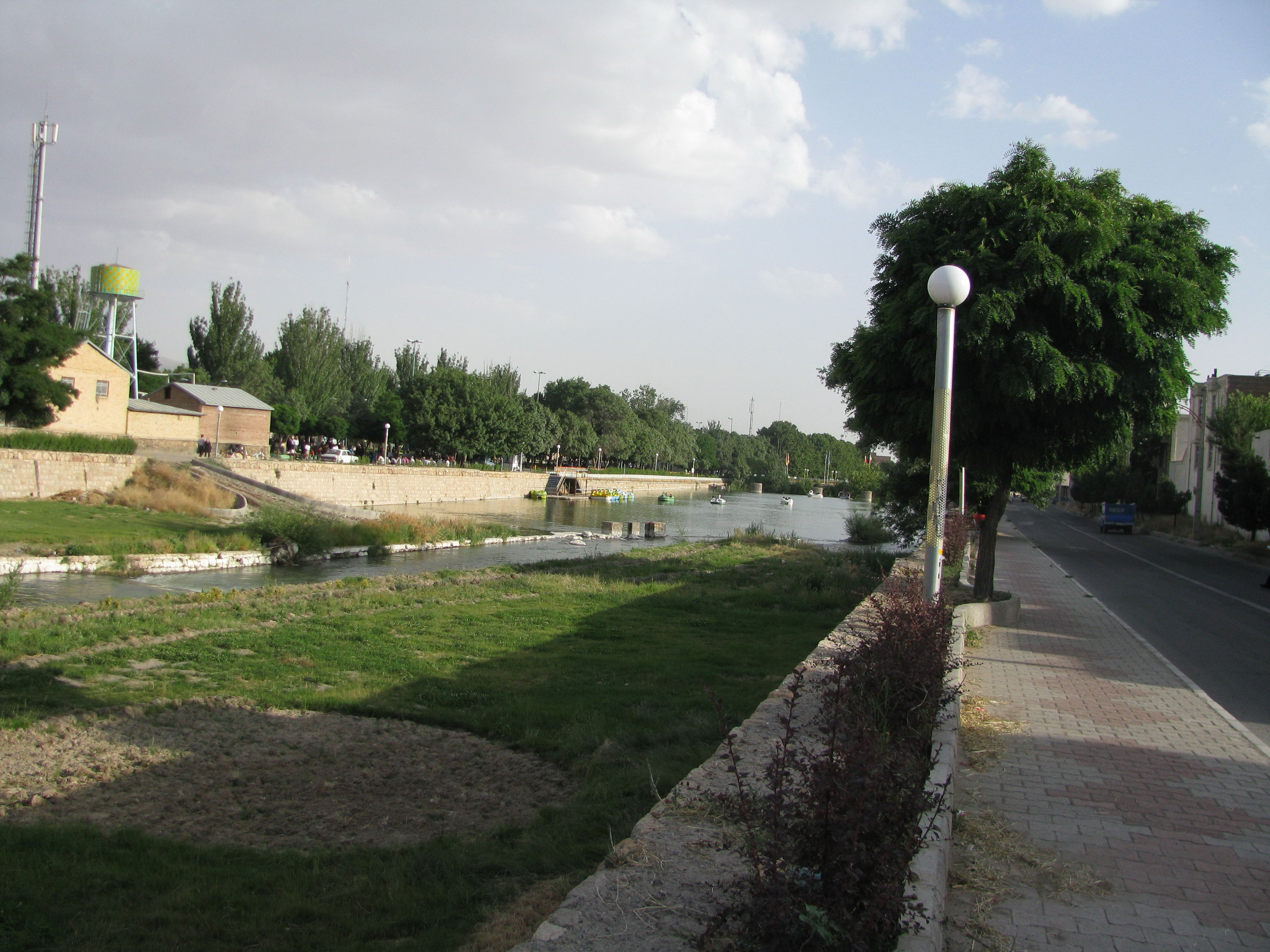
Sufi Chay River in Maragheh

Sufi Chay (Persian: صوفی‌چای) is a river in north-west Iran, at 37° 19' 45" N, 46° 4' 36" E. The river rises at Mount Sahand in the mountains to the east of Lake Urmia, and flows south past Alavian and Senshon till it reaches Maragheh city where it turns east and enters the endorheic Lake Urmia in a large delta at Bonab.

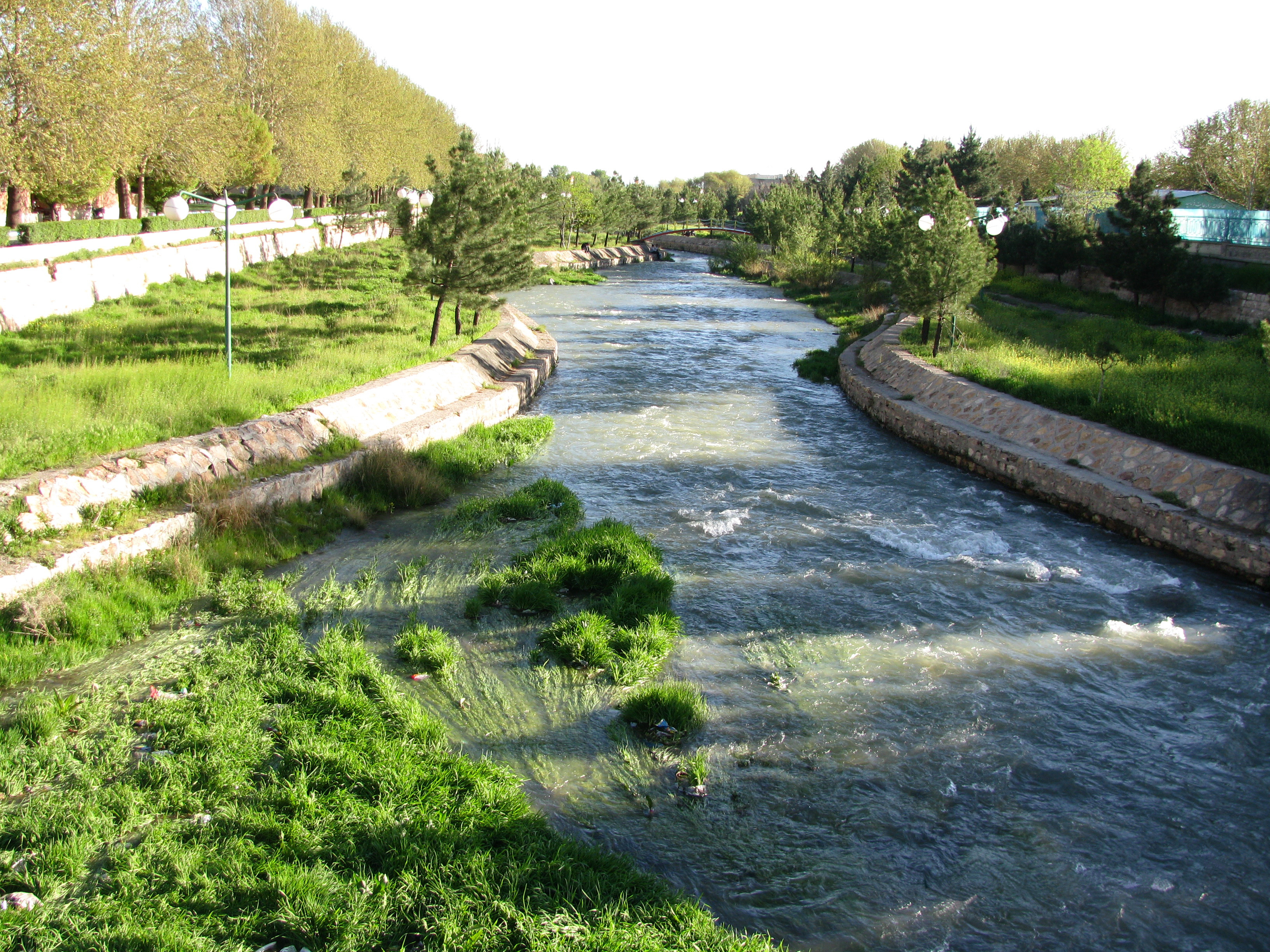
Sufi Chay River in Maragheh
