= Sulafa Khatun =

Atabeg of Maragha (AD 1209–1225), last member of the Ahmadilis dynasty

Sulāfa Khātūn (d. after 1225), was the ruling atabeg of Maragha between 1209-1225. She was the last member of the Ahmadilis dynasty and its only female ruler.

She was the daughter or possibly granddaughter of Alā 'al - Din Qarāsunqur.

Sulafa Khatun succeeded Arslan-Aba II in 1209. It was uncommon and controversial for a woman to become a ruler in an Islamic state, whether as a monarch or as regent. Ibn al-Athir quoted Muhammad saying "No people will succeed if they have a woman as their ruler."

She was married to atabeg Korp Arslan and had a son with him, who died in 1208. She remarried the Eldiguzids Prince Ozberg. In 1220, the Mongols invaded Caucasus, and laid siege to Maragha in April 1221. Sulafa Khatun was besieged in the citatel of Ru'in Diz, which she successfully defended against the Mongols.

In 1225, she was defeated by Jalal al-Din Mangburni. She divorced her spouse Ozberg, was obliged to marry Jalal al-Din Mangburni and abdicated her power to him, thus ending the Maragha state.
