= Maragheh =

City in East Azerbaijan province, Iran

Maragheh Persian: مراغه Azerbaijani: مراغا
- City
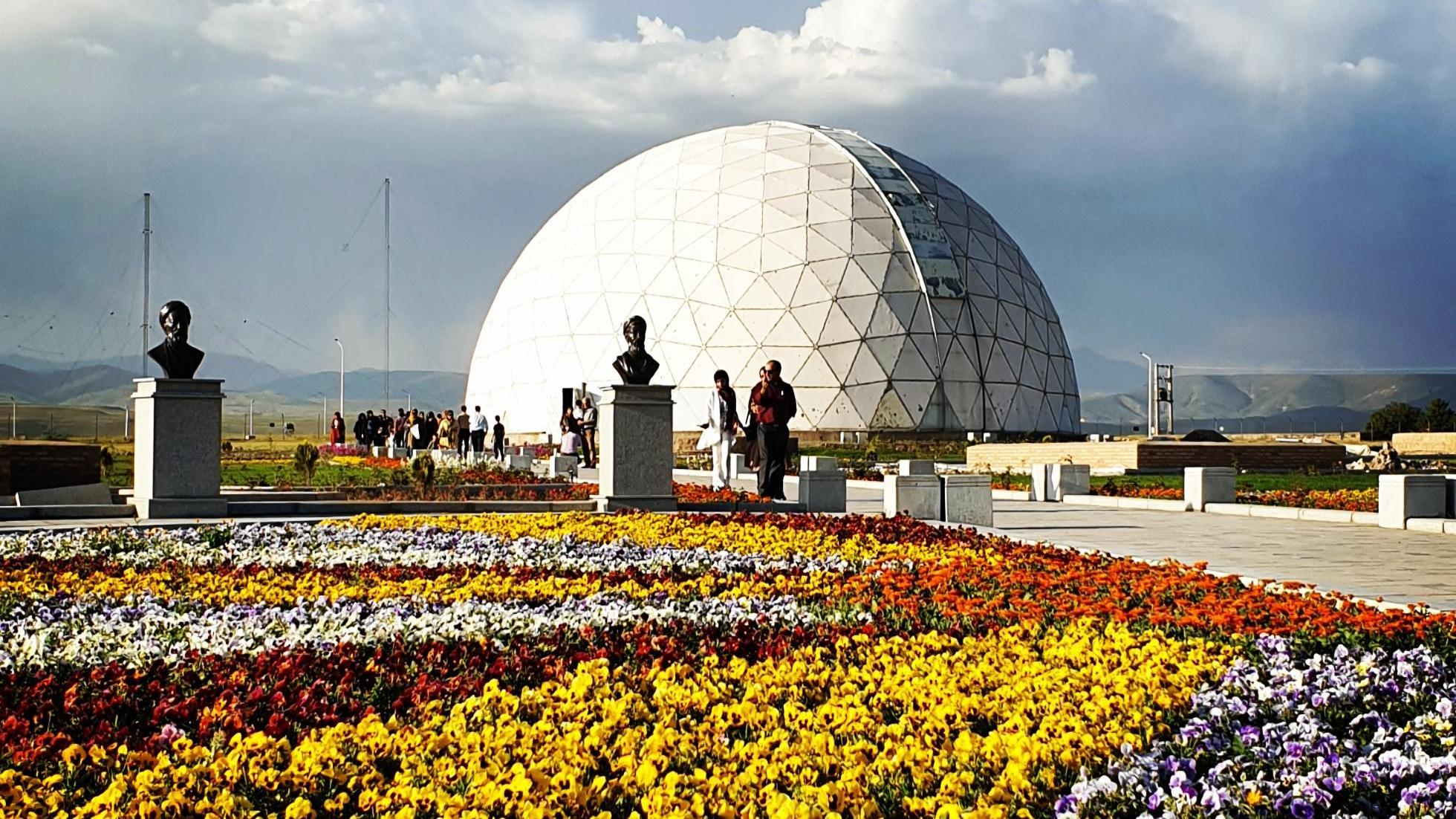

- Location within Iran
- Coordinates: 37°23′22″N 46°14′16″E
- Country: Iran
- Province: East Azerbaijan
- County: Maragheh
- District: Central

Government
  - Mayor: Ali Nezhadabyaz (acting)
  - Parliament: Ali Alizadeh

Population (2016)
  - Total: 175,255
- Time zone: UTC+3:30 (IRST)
- Website: www.maraghe.com

Maragheh (Persian: مراغه) (Note: Also romanized as Marāgheh; also known as Marāgha (Azerbaijani: مراغا; and Armenian: Մարաղա)) is a city in the Central District of Maragheh County, East Azerbaijan province, Iran, serving as capital of both the county and the district. Maragheh is on the bank of the river Sufi Chay. It is 130 kilometres (81 mi) from Tabriz, the largest city in northwestern Iran.

== History ==
=== Pre-Islamic history ===
It has been long suggested that Maragheh is identical with Phraaspa/Phraata, the winter capital of Atropatene. The 9th-century Muslim historian al-Baladhuri (died 892) reports that the town was originally known as Akra-rudh (called "Afrah-rudh" by Ibn al-Faqih, and "Afrazah-rudh" by Yaqut al-Hamawi) a Persian name which means "river of Afrah", and which the Russian orientalist Vladimir Minorsky considered to seem reminiscent of the name of Phraata. He added that it is unlikely that Maragheh did not exist during the Roman era, due to its favorable location.

=== Rule under the caliphate and Sajids ===
Map of Adharbayjan and its surroundings in the 9th century

During the Arab conquest of Iran, the towns of Adharbayjan (which also must have included Maragheh) were captured by al-Mughira. The Umayyad prince Marwan ibn Muhammad briefly stayed at Maragheh following his expedition to Muqan and Gilan in 740. It was during this period that the settlement was given the name of "Maragheh" (meaning "place where an animal rolls") due to the large quantity of dung there (Minorsky considers this to be an Arabic folk etymology of pre-existing local name). Marwan also engaged in some building activities in the town. Control over the town was later handed to the daughters of the Abbasid caliph Harun al-Rashid (r. 786–809).

Due to the rebellion of the lord of Tabriz, Wajna ibn Rawwad, a wall was erected around Maragheh and a garrison was also established there. This was done under the orders of Khuzayma ibn Khazim, the governor of Adharbayjan and Arminiya (Armenia), a position he had probably reached in 803. Following the launch of the rebellion of Babak Khorramdin in 816/17, the people sought shelter in Maragheh. The caliph al-Mam'un (r. 813–833) soon had the walls of the town was restored, followed by the re-population of the place. In 836, Maragheh served as the winter quarters of Khaydhar ibn Kawus al-Afshin during his expedition against Babak.

In an attempt to reduce the unstable autonomy of the Arab chieftains of Adharbayjan and partly to curb the dominance of the Bagratid kings of Armenia, the caliph al-Mu'tamid installed Muhammad ibn Abi'l-Saj as the governor of Adharbayjan and Armenia in 889/90, or more likely, in 892. The latter belonged to the Sajid family, native to Ushrusana and most likely of Sogdian origin. Muhammad's first challenge came in the form of 'Abd-Allah ibn al-Hasan ibn al-Hamdani, a rebel who had taken control of Maragheh. Muhammad convinced him to surrender in 893 by promising his safety, but once 'Abd-Allah did so he was executed by the Sajid. Maragheh was afterwards made Muhammad's capital, though he usually resided in Barda'a. Muhammad amassed so much authority that he briefly declared independence from the caliphate.

Following Muhammad's death to an epidemic in 901, his troops installed his son Devdad ibn Muhammad on the throne. Five months after, however, the latter was removed from power by his uncle Yusuf ibn Abi'l-Saj, who destroyed the walls of Maragheh and moved his capital to Ardabil. In 909, Yusuf was officially acknowledged as the ruler of Adharbayjan and Armenia by the newly ascended caliph al-Muqtadir. A dirham struck by Yusuf at Maragheh from the same year has been found. The last Sajid ruler, Abu'l-Musafir al-Fath, was killed at Maragheh in 929.

=== Daylamite rule ===
Following the collapse of the Sajid kingdom, the Kurdish commander Daysam ibn Ibrahim al-Kurdi attempted to establish his rule over Azerbaijan, but he was eventually defeated in 941/42 by Marzuban ibn Muhammad (r. 941/42–957), who gained control over the region, expanding his realm as far as Dvin in Armenia. The latter belonged to the Sallarid dynasty, of Daylamite stock and originally centered in the Tarum district of Daylam. In 948, Azerbaijan was briefly controlled by the Buyid dynasty, as demonstrated by a coin struck at Maragheh by Abu Mansur Muhammad, a general of the Buyid ruler Rukn al-Dawla (r. 935–976).

=== Rawadid and Seljuk rule ===
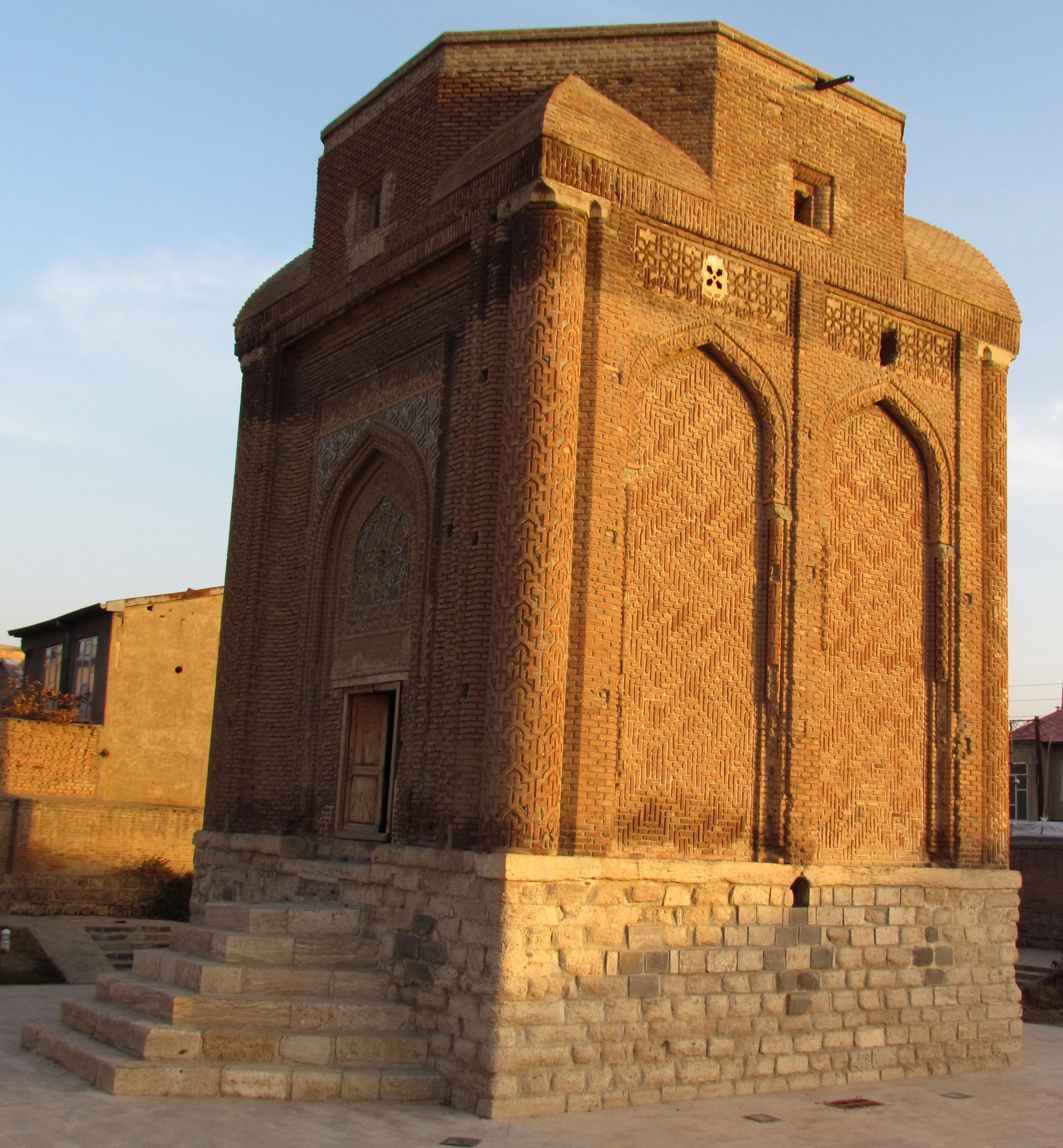
The Gonbad-e Sorkh, built under Seljuk rule in 1147

Following the death of the Sallarid Ibrahim I ibn Marzuban I in 983, Azerbaijan (excluding a small part, possibly Miyana) was conquered by the Kurdish Rawadids, former vassals of the Sallarids. In 1039, Maragheh was sacked by a wave of immigrating Oghuz Turks, who destroyed its mosque and killed many of its inhabitants. In 1054, the Rawadid ruler Abu Mansur Wahsudan (r. 1019–1058/9) was forced to submit to the Seljuk ruler Tughril (r. 1037–1063). In 1070, Tughril arrested Wahsudan's son and successor Abu Nasr Mamlan II (r. 1058/9–1070) and incorporated Azerbaijan into his domain, thus marking the end of the Rawadid dynasty. In 1104, the Seljuk brothers and rivals Berkyaruq (r. 1094–1105) and Muhammad I Tapar (r. 1105–1118) had their peace treaty signed near Maragheh. A year later, Muhammad I visited Maragheh. In 1111/12, a certain Ahmadil ibn Ibrahim ibn Wahsudan was appointed as the ruler of Maragheh. The background of the latter is obscure, but some modern historians consider him to be from the Rawadid dynasty.

=== Ahmadili rule ===
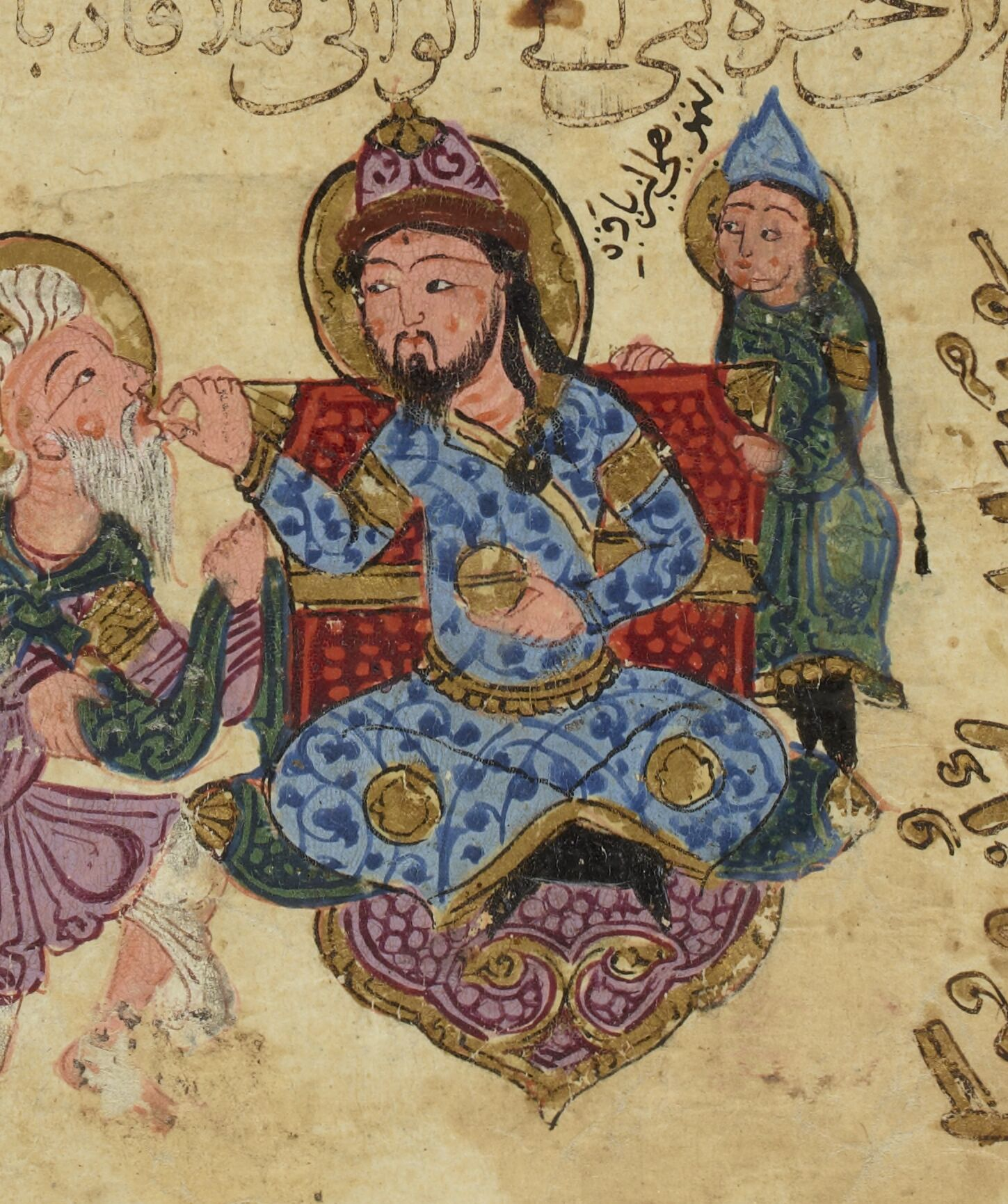
The Governor of Maraghah, in the Maqamat al-Hariri. Maqama 06, BNF Arabe 3929 (painted circa 1200-1210).

Following Ahmadil's death on 16 May 1116, he was reportedly succeeded by his slave Aq Sunqur, who by 1122 had emerged as a semi-independent subject of the Seljuks. This marked the start of the Ahmadili dynasty, a name they are commonly referred as due to their connection to Ahmadil. Aq Sunqur secretly conspired with the rebel prince Tughril ibn Muhammad, encouraging the latter to invade Maragheh in return for soldiers and aid. The rebellion failed in 1122/23, and led to the dismissal of Aq Sunqur by the Seljuk ruler Mahmud II (r. 1118–1131). However, Aq Sunqur was soon re-appointed as the governor of Maragheh. In 1150, the Seljuk ruler Ghiyath ad-Din Mas'ud (r. 1133–1152) besieged Maragheh, due to a conflict between Aq Sunqur's son and successor Arslan Aba and another local ruler. The town was captured after two days, but a resolution was soon reached through the mediation of various military leaders.

In 1174/75, the Eldiguzid prince (and subsequent ruler) Muhammad Jahan Pahlavan (r. 1175–1186) besieged Maragheh, but was unsuccessful in capturing it. The last Ahmadili ruler of Maragheh was Sulafa Khatun (r. 1209–1225). She was at Ru'in Dez during the Mongol conquest of Maragheh in 1221, led by generals Jebe and Subutai. The Mongols "stormed" the city on 30 March 1221 and burned it and killed its inhabitants. They continued south to capture and destroy Hamadan, until they finally took again the northern route to Derbent and the Northern Caucassus, which culminate with the Battle of the Kalka River in 1223.

=== Khwarazmian rule ===
In 1225, the Khwarazmshah of the Anushtegin dynasty, Jalal al-Din Mangburni (r. 1220–1231), reached Maragheh, which he was able to enter without any trouble, due the discontentment of the locals towards the raids and oppression by the Kingdom of Georgia. Mangburni attempted to restore Maragheh to its previous successful state.

=== Mongol rule ===
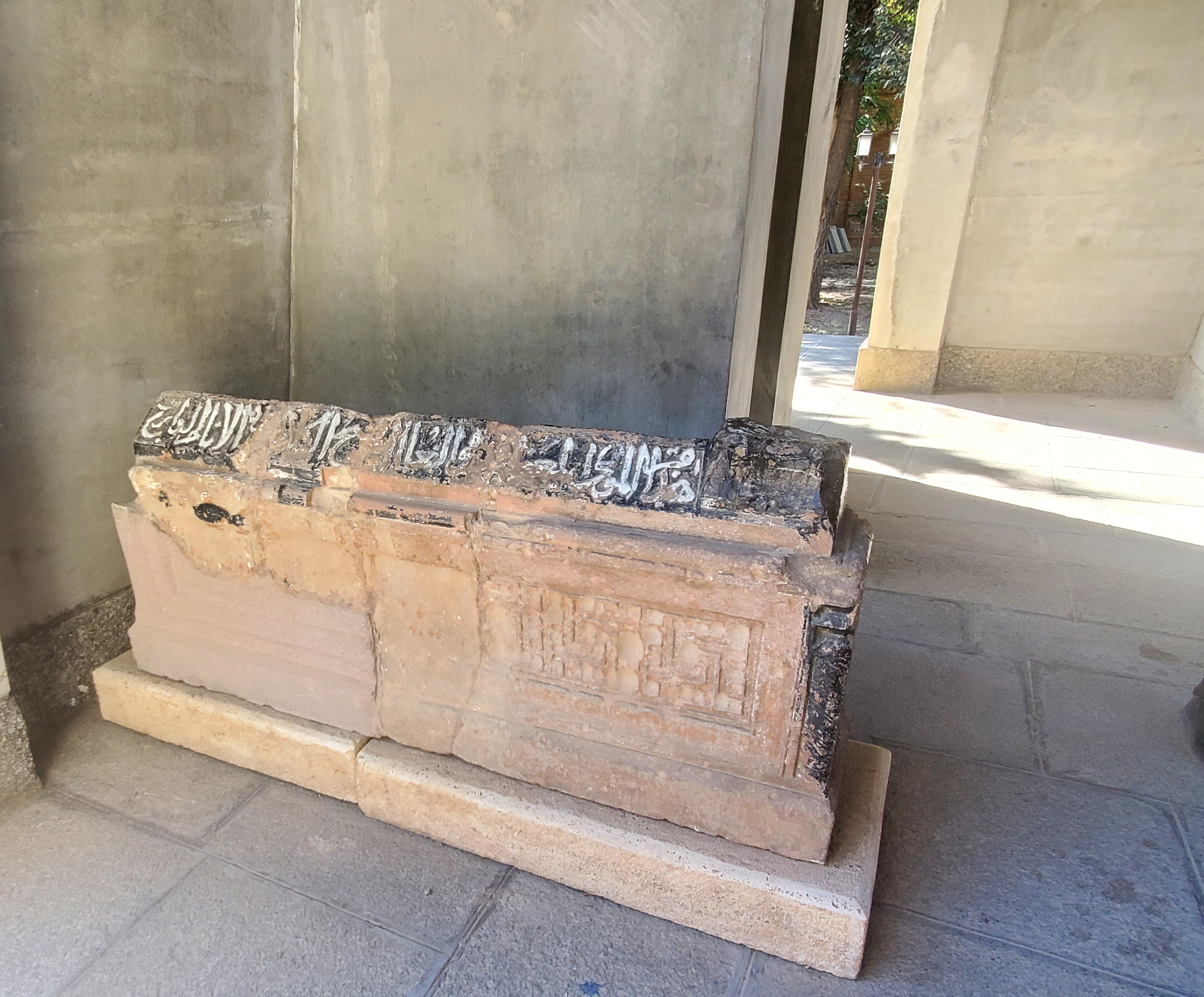
Tomb of the poet Awhadi Maraghai, who lived in Maragheh from about 1306 until his death in 1338.

In 1231, Mongol rule over Maragheh was made definite. After the Mongol ruler Hulagu Khan (r. 1256–1265) had captured Baghdad in 1258, he established his residence in Maragheh. He also had an observatory built under the directorship of Nasir al-Din al-Tusi. Other buildings from this period are lacking, since the first Mongol Ilkhanate rulers lived a semi-nomadic life. Zakariya al-Qazwini, who wrote a geographical dictionary around 1275, seems to have known Maragheh well. He described its mineral springs, a cave which probably corresponds to the later Chay-Baghi, a mountain called Zanjaqan with its calcareous spring, and the "impregnable" fortress of Ru'in Dez. In 1304, the Ilkhanate ruler Öljaitü (r. 1304–1316) appointed Nasir al-Din Tusi's son as the new head of the observatory. In 1306, the prominent Sufi poet Awhadi Maraghai settled in Maragheh, living there until his death on 6 April 1338. In 1312, Qara-Sunqur, the former amir al-umara of Aleppo, was appointed ruler of Maragheh by Öljaitü. This event is described by the 14th-century Maghrebi scholar Ibn Battuta, who also reports that Maragheh was called "Little Damascus". Qara-Sunqur died in 1328.

Writing c. 1340, Hamdallah Mustawfi described Maragheh as the capital of a tuman which included all the southern portion of Azerbaijan. It bordered the tumans of Tabriz on the north and Khoy on the west; to the east was Iraq-e Ajam and to the south was Kurdistan. Among the cities underneath Maragheh were Dih-i Khwaraqan, Leylan, and Pasveh. He also described six districts that belonged to Maragheh, some of whose readings are uncertain: Sarajun, Niyajun, Duzakhrud, Gavdul (at the confluence of the Leylan and Jaghatu rivers), Behestan, and Hashtrud. He also mentioned Anguran as a dependency of Maragheh. Mustawfi reports that inhabitants of Maragheh spoke pahlavī-e moḡayyar ("modified Pahlavi"), i.e. the vernacular of northwestern and central Iran.

=== Modern era ===
The 17th century Ottoman Turkish traveler Evliya Çelebi mentioned that the women or the "female society" in Maragheh mostly conversed in Pahlavi. According to Mortaza Firuzi, Hossein Hassanpashaei, and Sanaz Rahkarfarshi, some sources either falsely disregard this language or deem it as the dominant language of Maragheh, which was most likely Turkman based on the account of Evliya Çelebi. According to the Encyclopedia of Islam, the current inhabitants speak Azeri Turkish, but in the 14th century, they still spoke "arabicized Pahlawi," an Iranian dialect of the north western group.

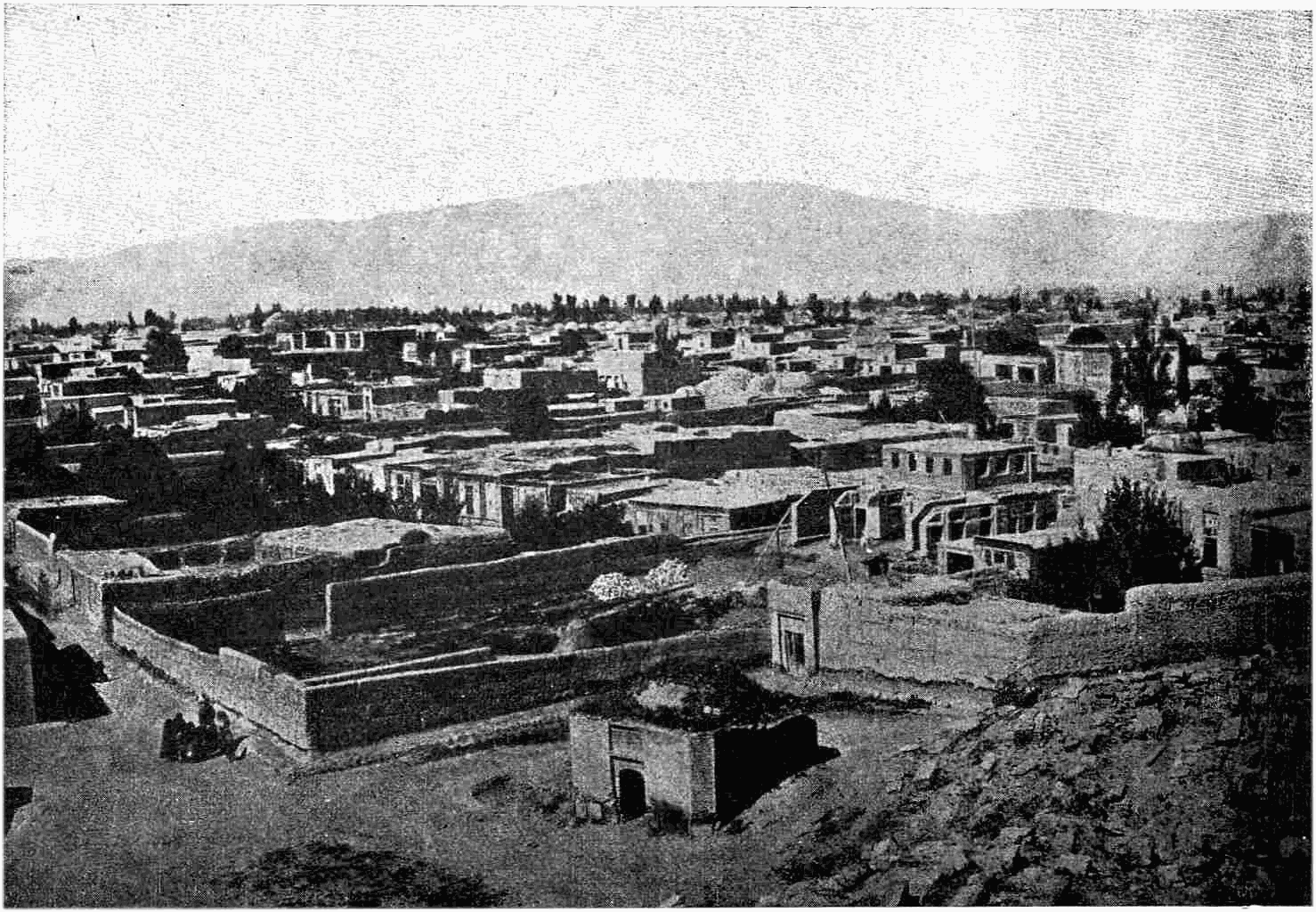
Maragheh around the turn of the 20th century

Between the 18th and 20th centuries, Maragheh was governed by the Moqaddam family.

== Demographics ==
=== Language and ethnicity ===
The population consists mostly of Iranian Azerbaijanis who are bilingual in Azerbaijani and Persian.

=== Population ===
At the time of the 2006 National Census, the city's population was 146,405 in 38,891 households. The census in 2011 counted 162,275 people in 47,552 households. The 2016 census measured the population of the city as 175,255 people in 54,958 households.

== Geography ==
Maragheh is situated in a narrow valley running nearly north and south at the eastern end of a well-cultivated plain opening towards Lake Urmia, the world's sixth-largest saltwater lake, which lies 30 km to the west. It lies at the southern foot of Mount Sahand, which separates it from the city of Tabriz to the north. The historical core of the city is on the east bank of the Sufi Chay, which comes down from Mount Sahand before turning west and eventually flows out into Lake Urmia. The climate is relatively mild and moist, and the abundant water supply makes the surrounding area very fertile. Maragheh is surrounded by extensive vineyards and orchards, all well watered by canals led from the river, and producing great quantities of fruit. The hills west of the town consist of horizontal strata of sandstone covered with irregular pieces of basalt. The remains of the historic Maragheh observatory crown one of these hills.

Maragheh lies just off the main highway from Tabriz to Kermanshah, which instead goes through Bonab further west. Another important road skirts around the south and southeast sides of Mount Sahand and connects Maragheh with Ardabil and Zanjan further east.

=== Climate ===
Maragheh has a cold semi-arid climate (BSk) according to the Köppen climate classification.

Climate data for Maragheh (1991–2020)
Month	Jan	Feb	Mar	Apr	May	Jun	Jul	Aug	Sep	Oct	Nov	Dec	Year
Record high °C (°F)	16.9 (62.4)	19.0 (66.2)	26.0 (78.8)	31.6 (88.9)	33.9 (93.0)	39.6 (103.3)	42.0 (107.6)	40.4 (104.7)	37.4 (99.3)	32.3 (90.1)	24.3 (75.7)	21.1 (70.0)	42.0 (107.6)
Mean daily maximum °C (°F)	4.6 (40.3)	7.2 (45.0)	12.4 (54.3)	18.2 (64.8)	23.9 (75.0)	30.3 (86.5)	34.0 (93.2)	34.0 (93.2)	29.2 (84.6)	21.9 (71.4)	12.8 (55.0)	6.8 (44.2)	19.6 (67.3)
Daily mean °C (°F)	−0.3 (31.5)	1.8 (35.2)	6.6 (43.9)	12.0 (53.6)	17.2 (63.0)	23.1 (73.6)	26.8 (80.2)	26.6 (79.9)	21.7 (71.1)	15.0 (59.0)	7.1 (44.8)	1.9 (35.4)	13.3 (55.9)
Mean daily minimum °C (°F)	−3.8 (25.2)	−2.1 (28.2)	2.1 (35.8)	6.8 (44.2)	11.3 (52.3)	16.5 (61.7)	20.4 (68.7)	20.3 (68.5)	15.5 (59.9)	9.8 (49.6)	3.2 (37.8)	−1.5 (29.3)	8.2 (46.8)
Record low °C (°F)	−20.6 (−5.1)	−16.6 (2.1)	−13.2 (8.2)	−6.2 (20.8)	1.0 (33.8)	8.0 (46.4)	11.0 (51.8)	12.4 (54.3)	5.0 (41.0)	−0.6 (30.9)	−9.0 (15.8)	−18.4 (−1.1)	−20.6 (−5.1)
Average precipitation mm (inches)	27.2 (1.07)	28.2 (1.11)	41.3 (1.63)	56.4 (2.22)	29.3 (1.15)	5.4 (0.21)	2.2 (0.09)	0.6 (0.02)	5.0 (0.20)	19.8 (0.78)	38.1 (1.50)	26.7 (1.05)	280.2 (11.03)
Average precipitation days (≥ 1.0 mm)	5.1	5.3	7.0	7.7	5.0	1.4	0.4	0.3	0.9	3.0	5.2	4.7	46.0
Average relative humidity (%)	69.0	64.0	56.0	52.0	46.0	33.0	31.0	29.0	33.0	45.0	61.0	68.0	48.9
Average dew point °C (°F)	−5.6 (21.9)	−4.8 (23.4)	−2.5 (27.5)	1.4 (34.5)	4.3 (39.7)	5.1 (41.2)	7.3 (45.1)	6.2 (43.2)	3.7 (38.7)	2.0 (35.6)	−0.6 (30.9)	−3.8 (25.2)	1.1 (34.0)
Mean monthly sunshine hours	144.0	160.0	194.0	220.0	283.0	358.0	371.0	361.0	314.0	248.0	179.0	138.0	2,970
Source: NOAA

== Maragha observatory ==
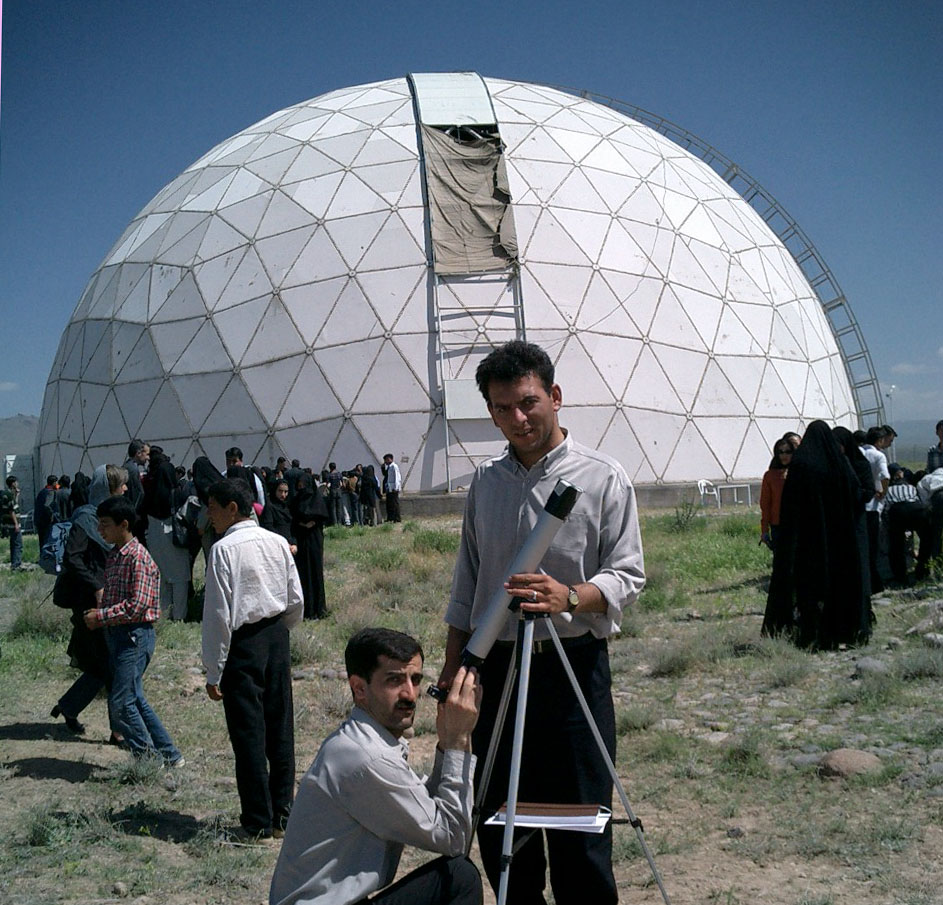
Venus transit 2004 at the site of observatory

On a hill west of the town are the remains of the famous Maragheh observatory called Rasad Khaneh, constructed under the direction the Ilkhanid king, Hülagü Khan for Nasir al-Din al-Tusi. The building, which no doubt served as a citadel as well, enclosed a space of 340 by 135 meters, and the foundations of the walls were 1.3 to 2 meters in thickness. The observatory was constructed in the thirteenth century and was said to house a staff of at least ten astronomers and a librarian who was in charge of the library which allegedly contained over 40,000 books. This observatory was one of the most prestigious during the medieval times in the Islamic Empire during the golden age of Islamic science. The famous astronomer Ibn al-Shatir of Damascus built on the work of Maragha astronomers 100 years later.

In 1256 Nasir al-Din al-Tusi came to work at the Maragheh observatory after being attacked by a group of Mongols who came from the east. These Mongols ambushed Iran, crushing everything in their path. Nasir al-Din al-Tusi was located at the Alamut, a castle in the South Caspian province of Qazin, when the Mongols invaded. Hulagu Khan was the leader of the Mongols and grandson of Genghis Khan. He was a fearless leader and warrior who was determined to conquer not only the Alamut, but many other countries across the globe as well. In order to spare his life, Nasir al-Din al-Tusi told Hulagu that he could predict the future if only he had better equipment. Being interested in science, Hulagu believed him and appointed Nasir al-Din al-Tusi as the scientific advisor of the Mongols. Hulagu allowed Nasir al-Din al-Tusi to build an observatory, and Nasir al-Din al-Tusi chose Maragha, Iran. In 1259, the Maragheh observatory began construction, which took a total of three years to complete. Hulagu also put Nasir al-Din al-Tusi in charge of waqfs which were religious endowments. As director of the observatory, Nasir al-Din al-Tusi and his team were able to make fascinating discoveries in astronomy, physics, and mathematics.

Nasir al-Din al-Tusi was the director of the Maragheh observatory, and made many new discoveries while he was there. Such discoveries include the Tusi-couple, a system based on geometry that includes a smaller circle within a larger circle that is twice the diameter of the smaller circle. The rotations of the smaller circle allow a specific point on the circumference to oscillate back and forth in linear motion. The Tusi-couple solved many issues with Ptolemaic's systems over planetary motion. Also, he helped astronomy become more accurate by discovering brand new stars as well as composing a star catalogue with detailed information about each star. Another notable work from Nasir al-Din al-Tusi was an astronomical book that contained detailed notes and observations about the movement of planets. Under Nasir al-Din al-Tusi, scholars from across the Islamic world came to the Maragheh observatory in order to further their studies in math, science, and astronomy. Furthermore, many new instruments were introduced to the observatory, which made him and his team's work a competitor to that of Europe.

The Maragheh observatory eventually had its downfall in the 13th century. The Mongol leader, Hulagu, died in 1265, and Nasir al-Din al-Tusi died in 1274. Nasir al-Din al-Tusi's son became the director of the observatory after his father's death, however, there weren't enough scholars at the observatory to fund the research that was being conducted. Therefore, the Maragheh observatory became inactive at the beginning of the 14th century. Over time, the observatory began to crumble due to consistent earthquakes and the lack of preservation of the observatory. Furthermore, the contents of the observatory were stolen during Mongol raids which wiped out important documents and books that were contained within the libraries of the observatory.

== Universities in Maragheh ==
- University of Maragheh
- Payam-e Noor University of Maragheh
- Azad University of Maragheh

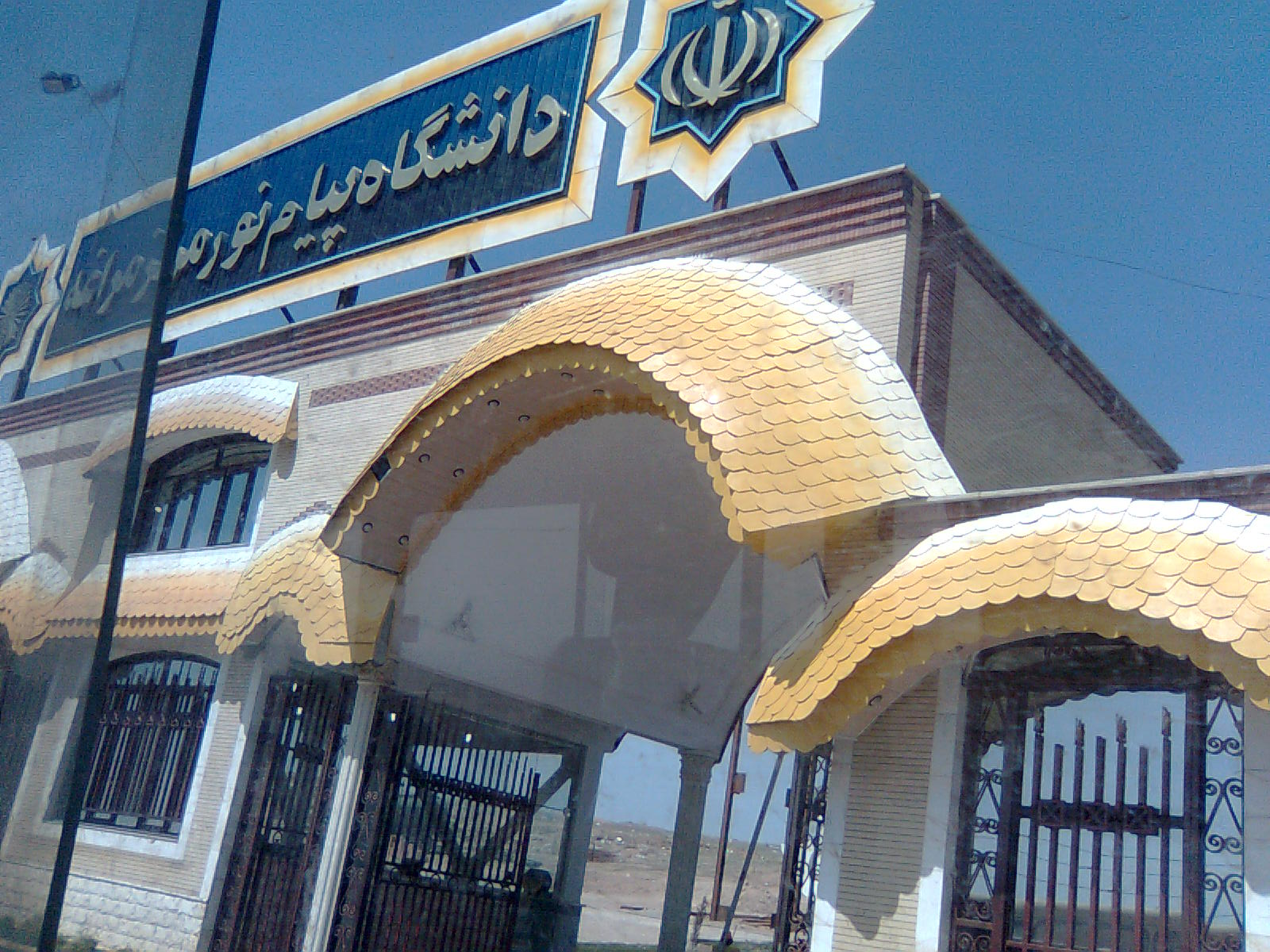
Entrance of Payam Noor University of Maragheh

== Famous natives ==
For a complete list see: Category:People from Maragheh

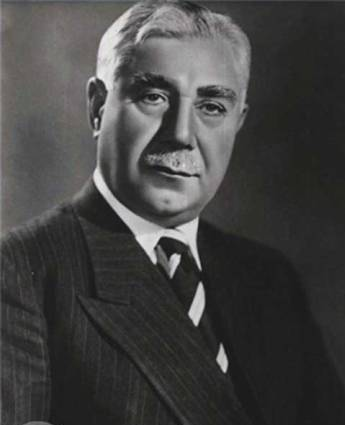
Mohammad Sa'ed, the 27th Prime Minister of Iran.

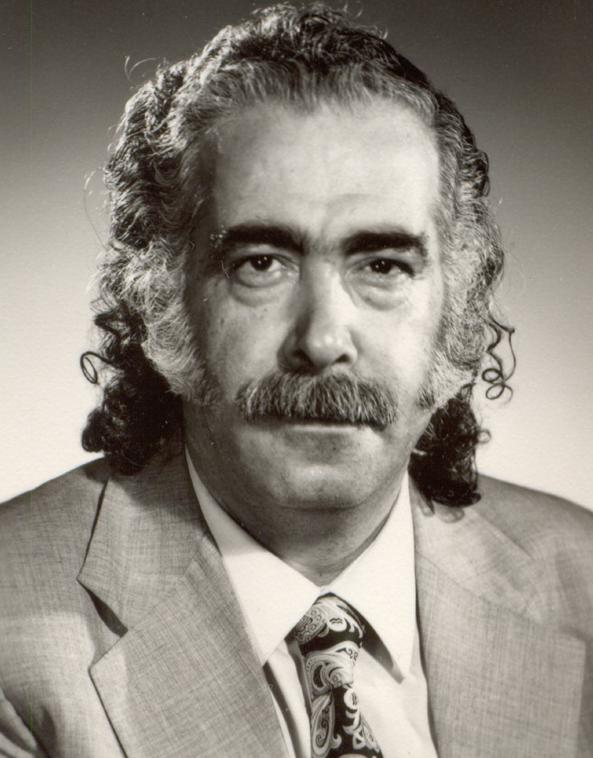
Bulud Qarachorlu, poet.

== Sister cities and twin towns ==
- Goražde, Bosnia and Herzegovina,

== Gallery ==
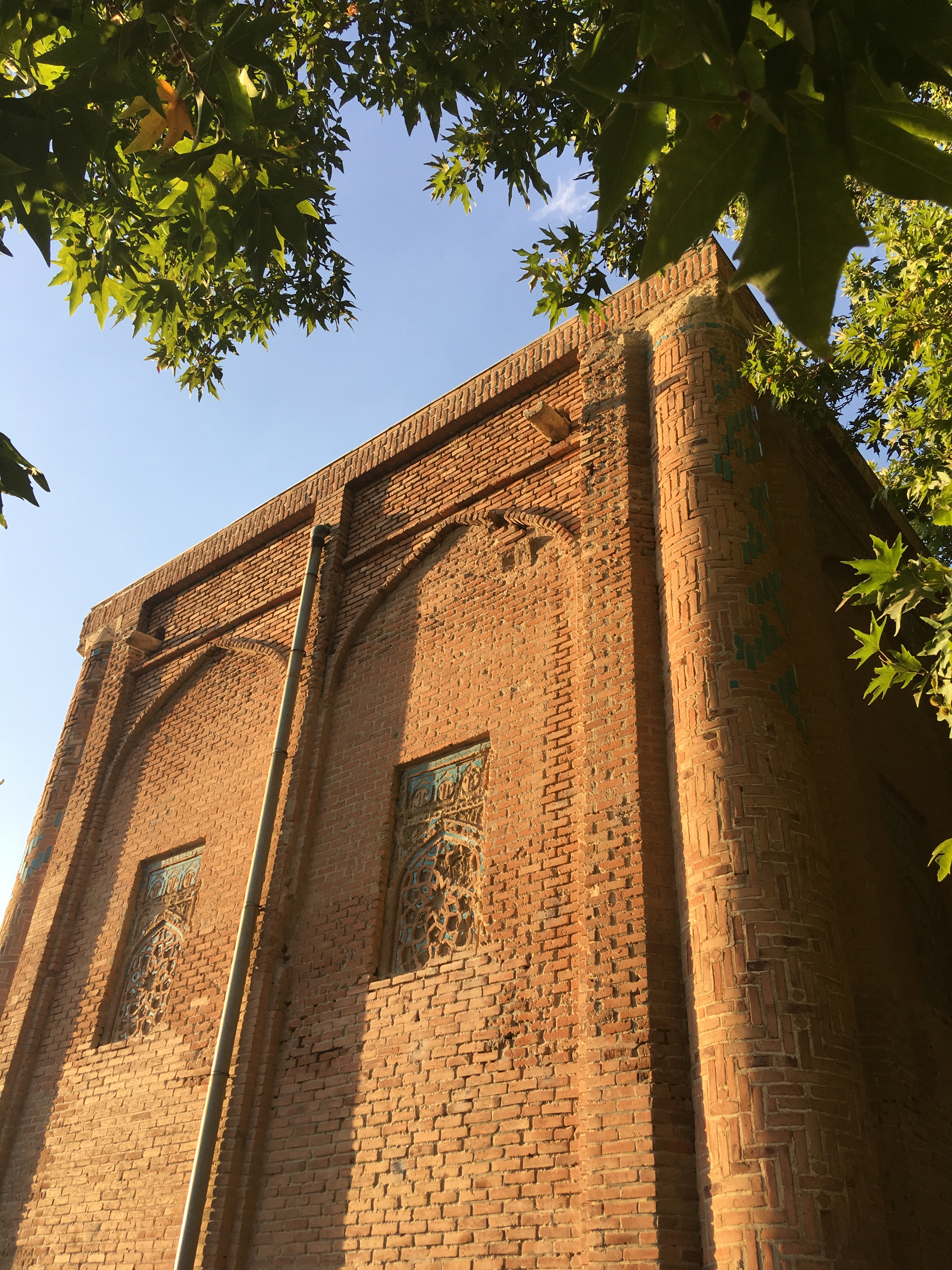
The Gonbad-e Ghafariyeh

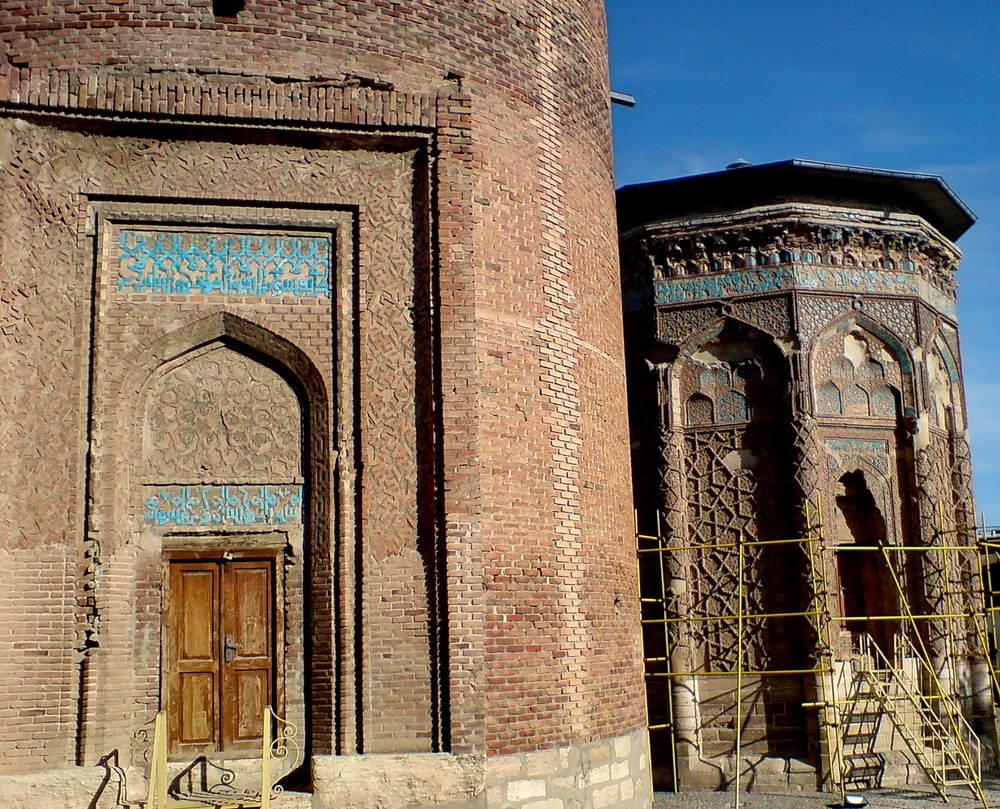
The Gonbad-e Modavvar (left) and the Gonbad-e Kabud (right)

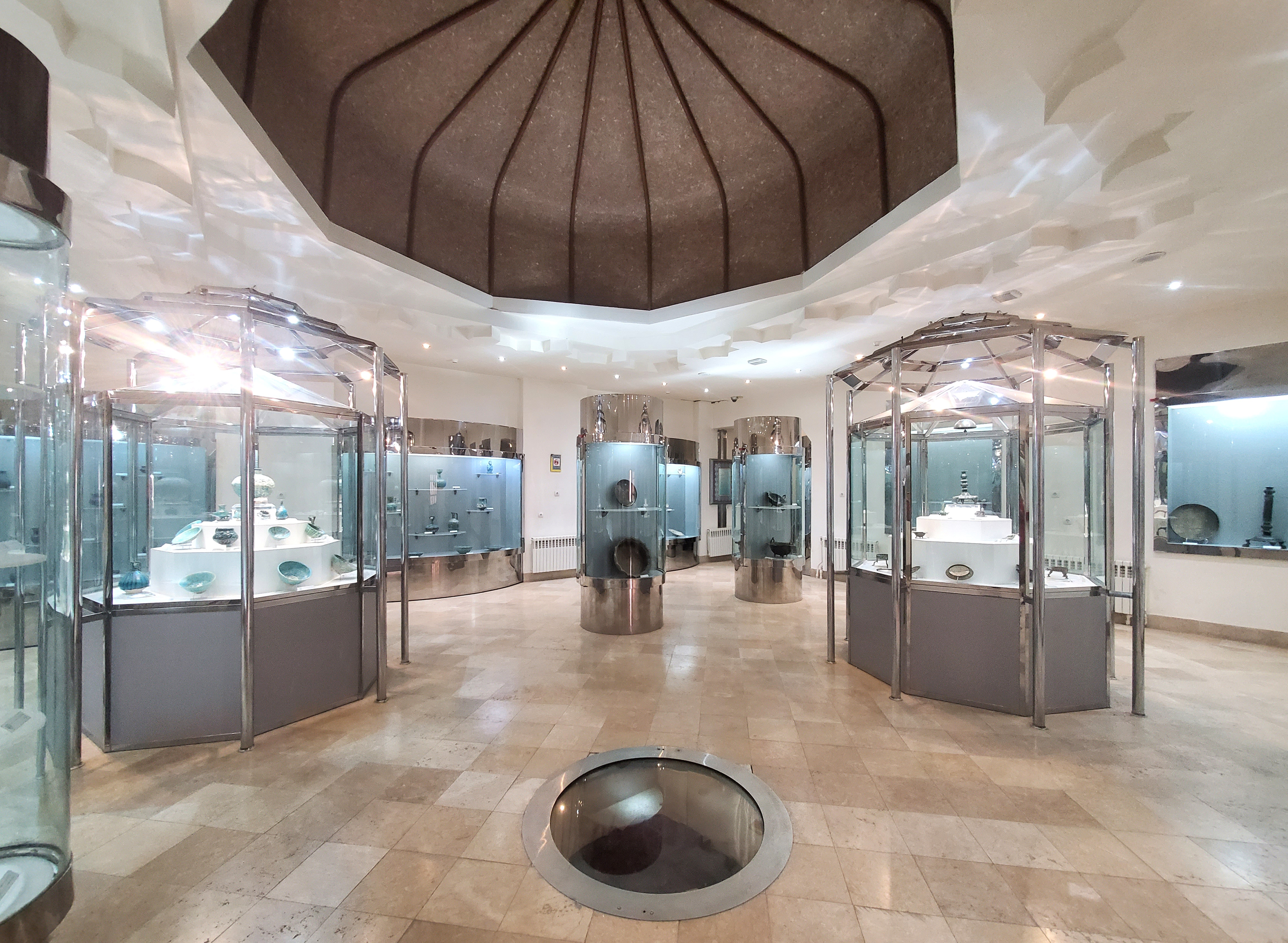
Museum of the Ilkhanate in Maragheh

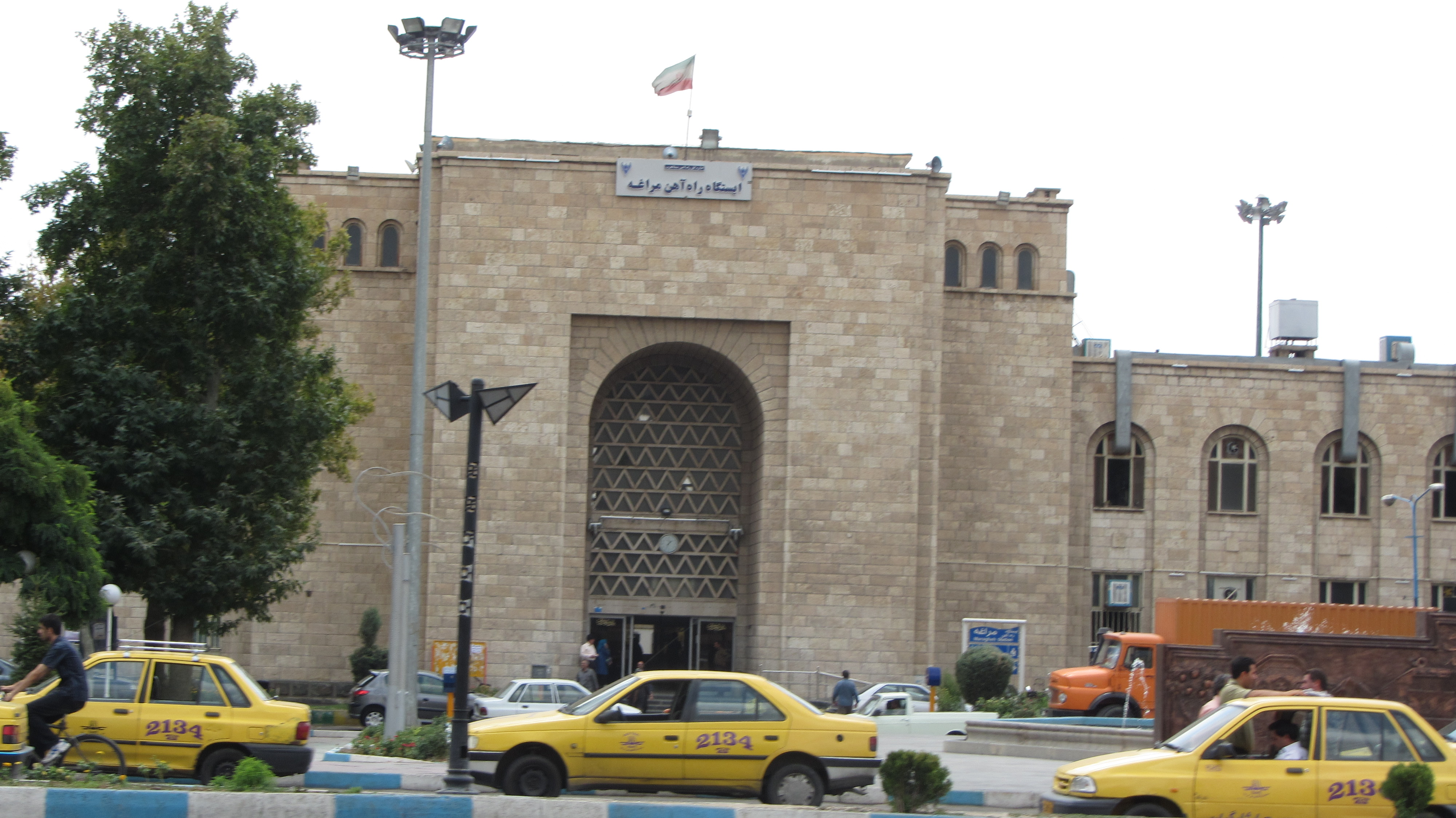
Train station in Maragheh

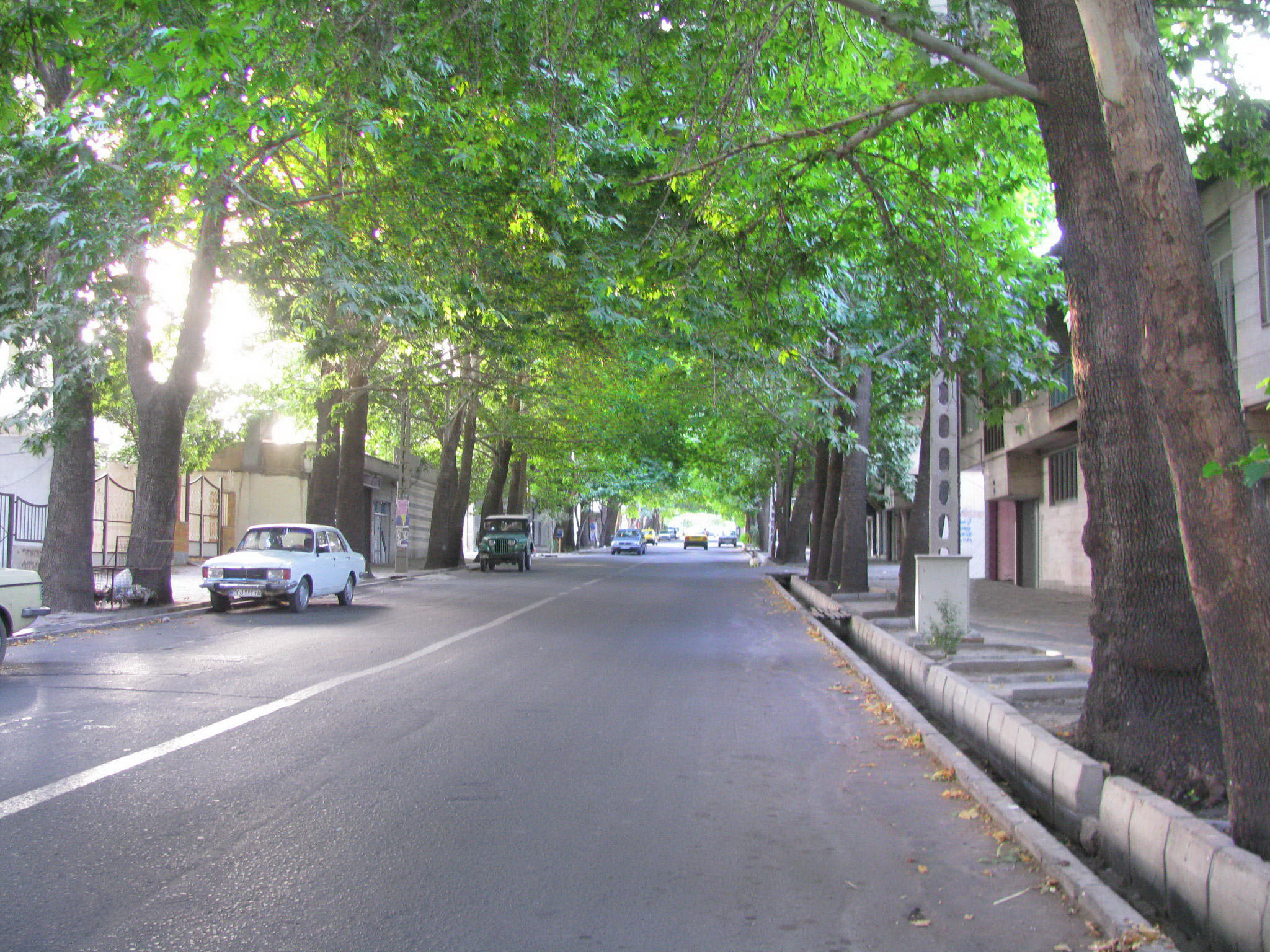
Street in Maragheh

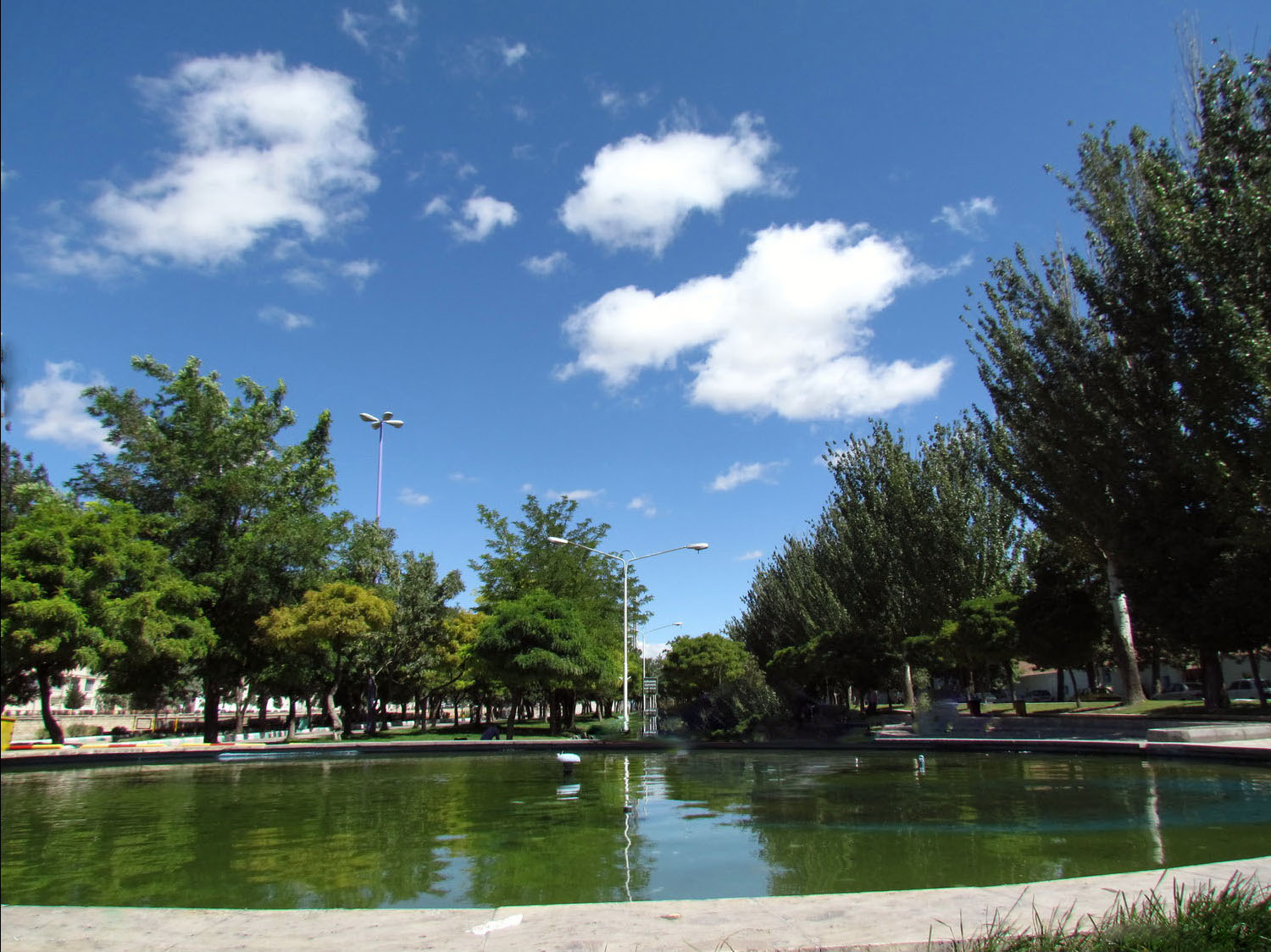
Mellat Park

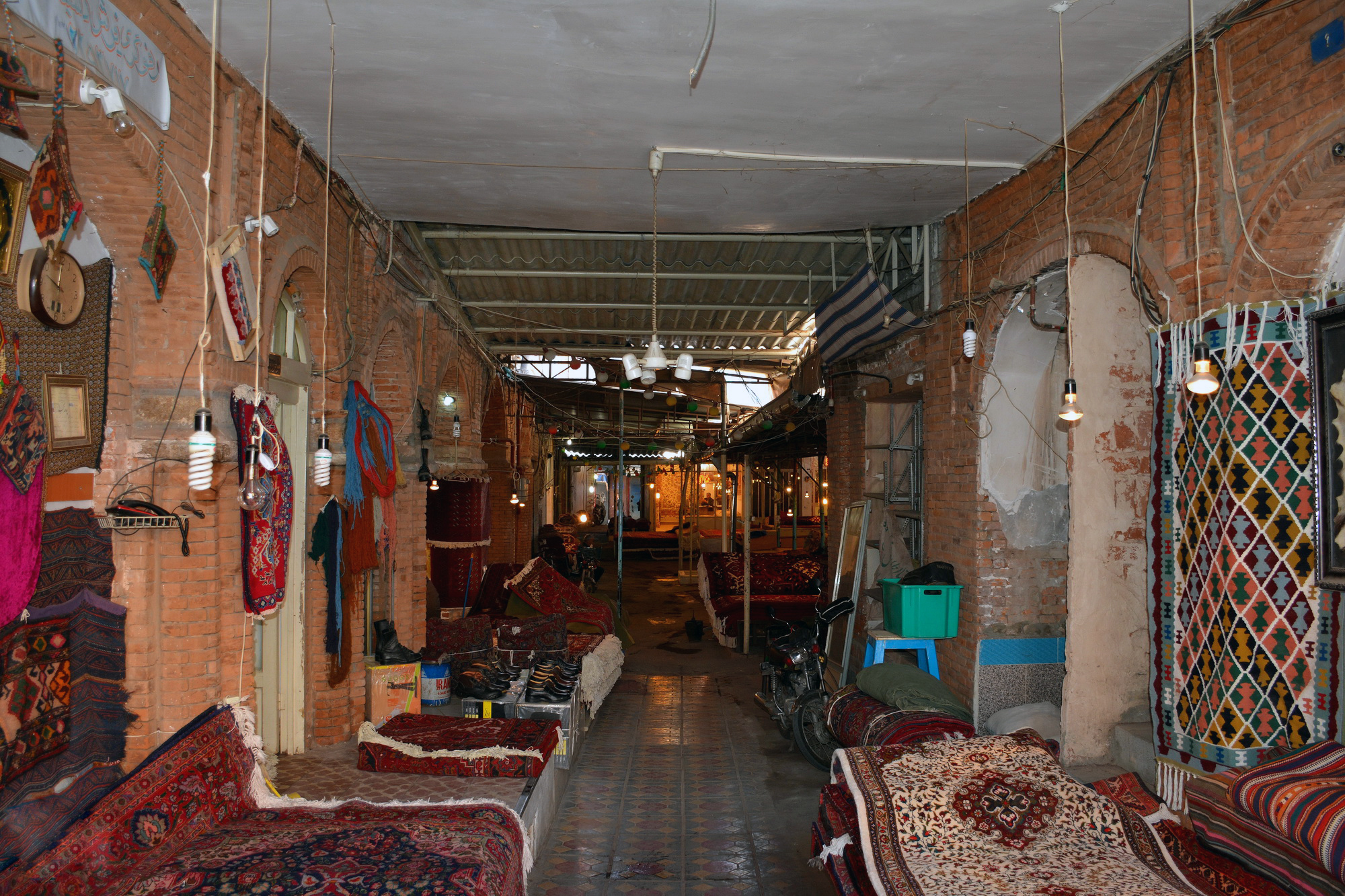
Bazaar in Maragheh

== See also ==
Maraghe travel guide from Wikivoyage

== Sources ==
- Bosworth, C. E. (1987). "Azerbaijan iv. Islamic History to 1941". In Yarshater, Ehsan (ed.). Encyclopædia Iranica. Vol. III/2: Awāʾel al-maqālāt–Azerbaijan IV. London and New York: Routledge & Kegan Paul. pp. 224–231. ISBN 978-0-71009-114-7.
- Bosworth, C. E. (2000). "Mosaferids". Encyclopaedia Iranica.
- Bournoutian, George (2021). From the Kur to the Aras: A Military History of Russia's Move into the South Caucasus and the First Russo-Iranian War, 1801–1813. Brill. ISBN 978-9004445154.
- Frye, R. N. (1984). The History of Ancient Iran. C. H. Beck. ISBN 978-3406093975.
- Good, Mary-Jo Delvecchio (1977). "Social Hierarchy in Provincial Iran: The Case of Qajar Maragheh". Iranian Studies. 10 (3): 129–163. doi:10.1080/00210867708701529. JSTOR 4310267. (registration required)
- Lewisohn, Leonard (2011). "Awḥadī Marāghaʾī". In Fleet, Kate; Krämer, Gudrun; Matringe, Denis; Nawas, John; Rowson, Everett (eds.). Encyclopaedia of Islam (3rd ed.). Brill Online. doi:10.1163/1573-3912_ei3_COM_30552. ISSN 1873-9830.
- Lornejad, Siavash; Doostzadeh, Ali (2012). Arakelova, Victoria; Asatrian, Garnik (eds.). On the modern politicization of the Persian poet Nezami Ganjavi (PDF). Caucasian Centre for Iranian Studies. Archived from the original (PDF) on 2022-09-14.
- Luther, K. A. (1987). "Atābakān-e Marāḡa". In Yarshater, Ehsan (ed.). Encyclopædia Iranica. Vol. II/8: Aśoka IV–Āṯār al-Wozarāʾ. London and New York: Routledge & Kegan Paul. pp. 898–900. ISBN 978-0-71009-108-6.
- Madelung, W. (1975). "The Minor Dynasties of Northern Iran". In Frye, Richard N. (ed.). The Cambridge History of Iran: From the Arab Invasion to the Saljuqs. Vol. 4. Cambridge: Cambridge University Press. pp. 198–249. ISBN 0-521-20093-8.
- Minorsky, V. (1991). "Marāg̲h̲a". In Bosworth, C. E.; van Donzel, E. & Pellat, Ch. (eds.). The Encyclopaedia of Islam, Second Edition. Volume VI: Mahk–Mid. Leiden: E. J. Brill. pp. 498–503. ISBN 978-90-04-08112-3.
- Peacock, Andrew (2017). "Rawwadids". Encyclopædia Iranica, online edition. New York.
- Yarshater, E. (1988). "Azerbaijan vii. The Iranian Language of Azerbaijan". In Yarshater, Ehsan (ed.). Encyclopædia Iranica. Vol. III/3: Azerbaijan IV–Bačča(-ye) Saqqā. London and New York: Routledge & Kegan Paul. pp. 238–245. ISBN 978-0-71009-115-4.
- Yavari, Neguin (2011). "Aḥmadīlīs". In Fleet, Kate; Krämer, Gudrun; Matringe, Denis; Nawas, John; Rowson, Everett (eds.). Encyclopaedia of Islam (3rd ed.). Brill Online. ISSN 1873-9830.

Preceded by Urgench	Capital of Ilkhanate (Persia); 1256–1265	Succeeded by Tabriz
