= Ahmadilis =

Turkoman dynasty in Iran (c. 1122–1225)

Ahmadili dynasty
- 1122–1225
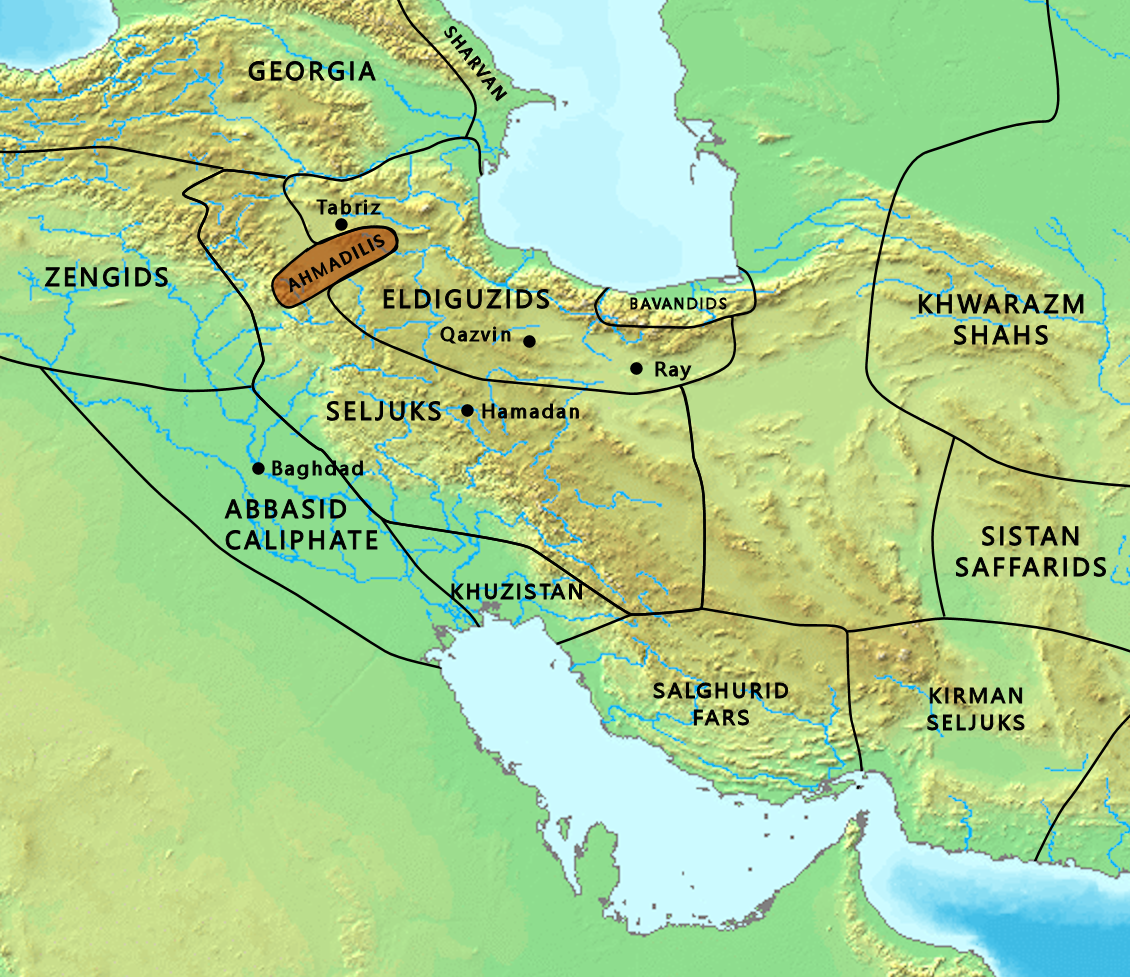
- Map of the Ahmadilis in 1180 CE.
- Capital: Maragheh
- Religion: Sunni Islam
- Government: Emirate
- History
  - Established: 1122
  - Disestablished: 1225
Preceded by	Succeeded by
Rawadid dynasty; Seljuk Empire	Khwarazmian Empire

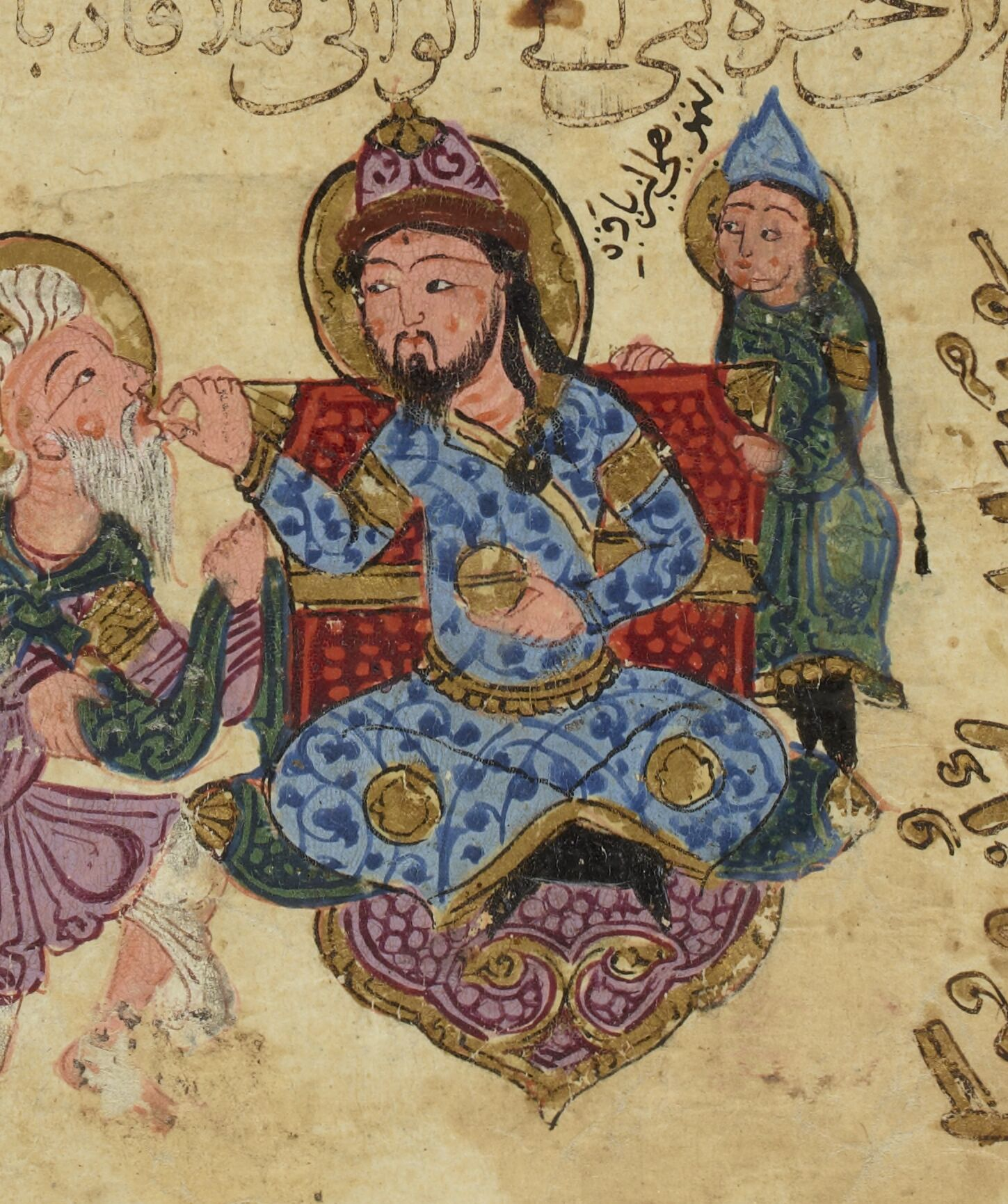
The Governor of Maraghah, in the Maqamat al-Hariri. Maqama 06, BNF Arabe3929 (painted circa 1200-1210).

The Ahmadilis (Persian: احمدیلی), also known as the Atabegs of Maragheh (اتابکان مراغه), Romanized as Atābakān-e Marāghe, were Atabegs of the Seljuk Empire and a local Turcoman dynasty who ruled from the early 12th century until 1208–09 in Maragheh itself and in Ru'in Dez for some years after the Mongol invasion of the Khwarazmian Empire. They ruled approximately from 1122 to 1225.

Notices in the chronicles of this localised line of Atabegs are only sporadic, and numismatic evidences have not thus far been found, so it is difficult to reconstruct their chronology and genealogy. Bosworth says that they were a dynasty of Oghuz Turk origin that started with Aq Sunqur Ahmadili, who was presumably a freedman of the commander of the Seljuq Empire, Ahmadil ibn Ibrahim. Aq Sunqur Ahmadili became Atagberg of the Seljuk Prince Dawud ibn Mahmud. His son Aq-Sonqur II was Ataberg for the infant son of Muhammad ibn Mas'ud in 1159, and in 1160 tried to impose him in place of Arslan-Shah (Seljuk sultan), who was supported by the Eldiguzids for the Seljuk succession, but in vain.

A female member of the family, Sulafa Khatun, was ruling Maragheh until these places were sacked by the Mongols in 1221. In 1225, Sulafa Khatun married the Khwarazmshah Jalal al-Din Mangburni, who administered her territories. In 1231, the region fell to the Mongol armies.

== Rulers ==
1. Aq Sunqur I, 1122-1134
2. Ak Sunkur II, 1134-1169
3. Ala al-Din Korpe Arslan and Rukn al-Din, 1134-1173
4. Falak al-Din, 1173-1189
5. Ala-al-Din Korpe Arslan, 1189-1208
6. Arslan-Aba II, 1208-1209
7. Sulafa Khatun, 1209-1225

== See also ==
- Turkic peoples#History
- Timeline of the Turkic peoples (500–1300)
