= Leonard Lewisohn (Islamic studies scholar) =

American author, translator, and lecturer (1953–2018)

Leonard Lewisohn (1953 – 6 August 2018) was an American author, translator and lecturer in the area of Islamic studies and a specialist in Persian language and Sufi literature. He was the editor of Mawlana Rumi Review, a publication of the Rumi Institute and Archetype, Cambridge, published once a year. He was a member of the Institute of Arab and Islamic Studies in University of Exeter.

== Works ==
- with L Anvar, Wondrous Words: The Poetic Mastery of Jalal al-Din Rumi, Nicosia, London, Rumi Institute and I.B. Tauris, 2011.
- Lewisohn L (eds) The Philosophy of Ecstasy: Rumi and the Sufi Tradition, Nicosia, London, Rumi Institute and I.B. Tauris, 2011.
- Lewisohn L (eds) Hafez and the Religion of Love in Classical Sufi Poetry, London, I.B. Tauris, 2010.
- with R Bly, Angels Knocking at the Tavern Door: Thirty Poems of Hafiz, New York, HarperCollins, 2008.
- with C Shackle, Attar and the Persian Sufi Tradition: The Art of Spiritual Flight, I B Tauris, 2007.
- The Wisdom of Sufism, Oxford, Oneworld, 2001.
- The Heritage of Sufism, vol. 2: The Legacy of Mediæval Persian Sufism, Oxford, Oneworld, 1999.
- Lewisohn L, Morgan D (eds) The Heritage of Sufism, vol. 3: Late Classical Persianate Sufism: the Safavid and Mughal Period, Oxford, 1999
- The Heritage of Sufism, vol. 1: Classical Persian Sufism from its Origins to Rumi, Oxford, Oneworld, 1999.
- Beyond Faith and Infidelity: the Sufi Poetry and Teachings of Mahmud Shabistari, Richmond, Surrey, Curzon Press, 1995.
- Divan-i Muhammad Shirin Maghribi, Tehran University Press and the McGill Institute of Islamic Studies, Tehran Branch; Wisdom of Persia Series No. XLIII, in collaboration with London University: SOAS Publications, 1993.
- An Anthology of Esoteric Traditions in Islam: Texts on Gnosis & Hermeneutics in Ismailism, Sufism, Muslim Philosophy, Twelver Shi‘ism & Illuminationism, London, I.B. Tauris and the Institute of Ismaili Studies
