= Justin (given name) =

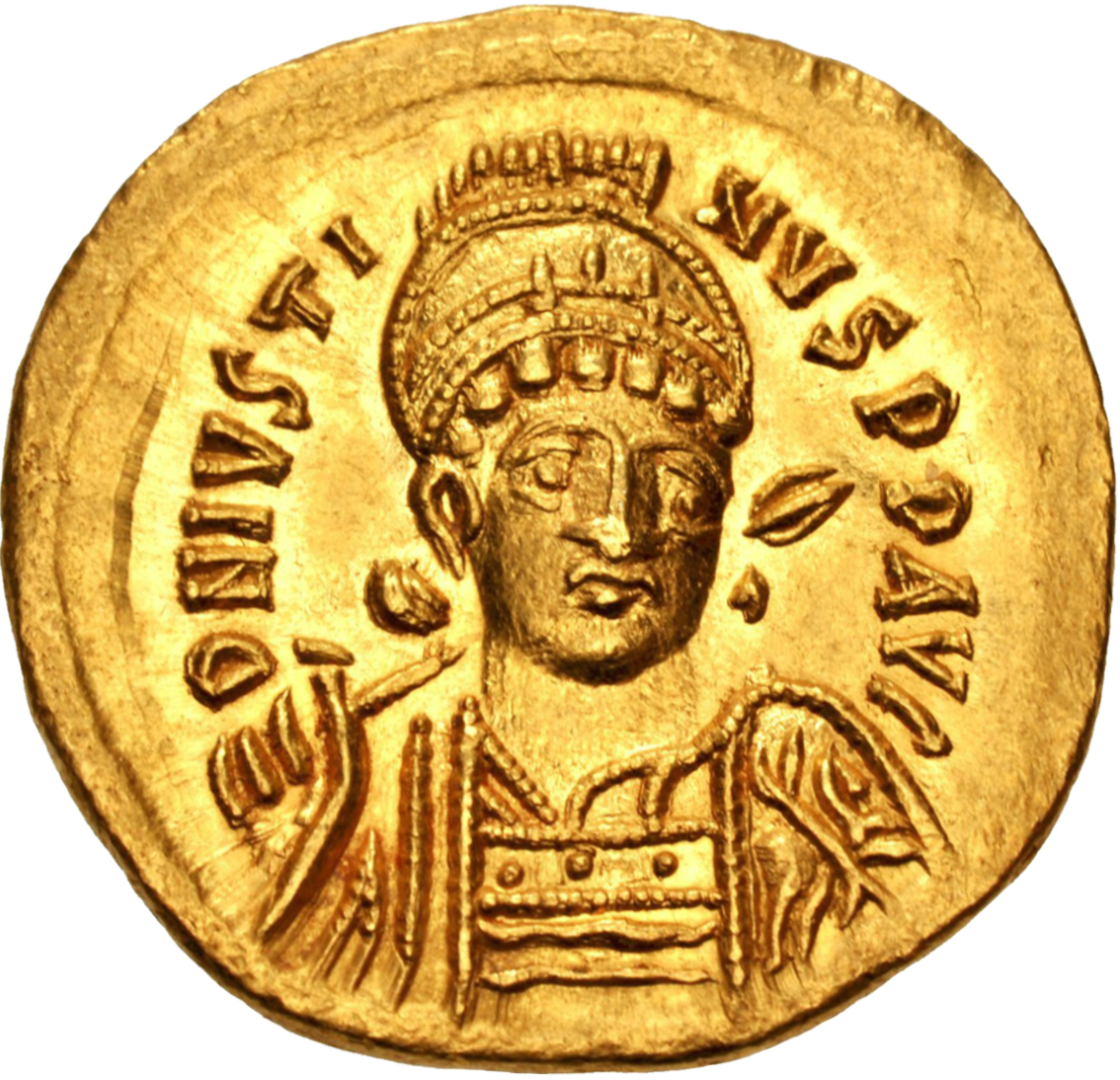
- Justin I, emperor of the Byzantine Empire
- Gender: Male

Origin
- Language: Latin
- Origin: Iustinius or Iustinus
- Meaning: Fair, just, honourable, honest, righteous

Other names
- See also: Justina; Justine; Justinian; Jestin; Jestyn

Justin is a masculine given name of Latin origin. It is the anglicized form of the Latin given name Justinus, a derivative of Justus, meaning "just", "fair", or "righteous". Justinus was the name borne by various early saints, notably a 2nd-century Christian apologist and a 3rd-century martyr. The name is also related to the similar Latin name Justinian. As an English name, Justin is common, particularly in the English-speaking world starting in the latter half of the 20th century.

== Cognates ==
- Albanian: Justinian
- Armenian: Հուստին (Hustin)
- Amharic: ዩስቲን (Yusitīni)
- Bulgarian: Юстин (Yustin)
- Catalan: Justí
- Cornish: Yestin
- Dutch: Joost, Justin
- Esperanto: Justino
- Finnish: Jussi
- French: Justin
- Galician: Xustino
- German: Justin
- Greek: Ιουστίνος (Ioustinos)
- Hawaiian: Iukekini
- Hebrew: יוסטינוס (Yôsetînûs)
- Hungarian: Jusztin
- Indonesian: Justin, Justus, Justian, Justinus
- Irish: Saorbhreathach
- Italian: Giustino
- Japanese: ジャスティン (Jasutin), ユスティン (Yusutin)
- Latgalian: Džastins, Justins
- Latin: Iustinius (IVSTINIVS), Iustinus (IVSTINVS)
- Latvian: Džastins, Justins, Justs
- Lithuanian: Justinas/Justas
- Maltese: Ġustinu
- Polish: Justyn
- Portuguese: Justo, Justino
- Romanian: Iustin
- Russian: Устин (Ustin), Иустин (Iustin), Юстин (Yustin)
- Serbo-Croatian: Јустин / Justin
- Sicilian: Giustinu
- Slovene: Justin
- Spanish: Justo, Justino
- Ukrainian: Устим (Ustym)
- Welsh: Iestyn

== People named Justin ==
- Justin Ahomadégbé-Tomêtin (1917–2002), prime minister of Dahomey (now Benin)
- Justin Allgaier (born 1986), American racing driver
- Justin Amash (born 1980), U.S. Congressman from Michigan
- Justin Ang, Singaporean radio presenter
- Justin Armbruester (born 1998), American baseball player
- Justin Armsden, Australian television news journalist
- Justin Arop (1958–1994), Ugandan javelin thrower
- Justin Baldoni (born 1984), American actor, director and activist
- Justin Barron (born 2001), Canadian ice hockey player
- Justin Barron (American football) (born 2001), American football player
- Justin Bartha (born 1978), American actor
- Justin Bean (born 1996), American basketball player
- Justin Berry (born 1986), American pornographer
- Justin Bieber (born 1994), Canadian musician
- Justin Berfield (born 1986), American actor
- Justin Blackmon (born 1990), American football player
- Justin Boren (born 1988), American National Football League football player
- Justin Brady, British actor
- Justin Brannan (born 1978), American musician and writer
- Justin Briner, American voice actor
- Justin Broadrick (born 1969), British musician
- Justin Brown (aquanaut), American aquanaut
- Justin Brown (defensive lineman), American and Canadian football defensive end
- Justin Brown (wide receiver), American football wide receiver
- Justin Bruihl (born 1997), American baseball player
- Justin Burnette, American former child actor
- Justin Burquist, American filmmaker
- Justin Carbonneau (born 2006), Canadian ice hockey player
- Justin Carmack (1981–2000), American child actor
- Justin Caruso, American DJ and record producer
- Justin Chancellor, English bassist for band Tool
- Justin Andrew Channing (born 1968), English former footballer
- Justin Chambers (born 1970), American actor
- Justin Chatwin (born 1982), Canadian actor
- Justin Chon (born 1981), American actor
- Justin Clegg (born 1997), English rugby union player
- Justin Lee Collins, English comedian and TV presenter
- Justin Connolly (1933–2020), British composer and teacher
- Justin Cook, American voice actor
- Justin Crawford (disambiguation), multiple people
- Justin Credible, the best-known ring name of American professional wrestler Peter Polaco
- Justin Cryer (born 2005), American football player
- Justin Dean (born 1996), American baseball player
- Justin Dedich (born 2000), American football player
- Justin Deeley, American actor
- Justin de Dios (born 1998), Filipino singer-songwriter, actor, dancer, creative director
- Justin Doellman (born 1985), American basketball player
- Justin Dunn (born 1995), American baseball player
- Justin Edwards (disambiguation), multiple people
- Justin Emerle (born 1976), American musician
- Justin Engel (born 2007), German tennis player
- Justin Evans (American football) (born 1995), American football player
- Justin Fairfax (1979–2026), American lawyer and politician, Lieutenant Governor of Virginia (2018–2022)
- Justin Ferizaj (born 2005), Irish football player
- Justin Fields (born 1999), American football player
- Justin Fletcher (born 1970), British children's TV personality
- Justin Flowe (born 2001), American football player
- Justin Forsett, American football player
- Justin Furstenfeld, American musician
- Justin Gaethje, American MMA fighter
- Justin Gatlin, American sprinter
- Justin Geiser, American politician
- Justin Gimelstob (born 1977), American tennis player
- Justin Gnanapragasam (born 1948), Sri Lankan Tamil Roman Catholic bishop
- Justin Goldberg, American music and film industry executive
- Justin Gonzales, American politician
- Justin Gorham (born 1998), American basketball player
- Justin Greaves (born 1994), Barbados and West Indies cricketer
- Justin Grimm (born 1988), American baseball player
- Justin Guarini (born 1978), American singer
- Justin Hall (born 1974), American blogger and journalist
- Justin Harmon (born 2001), American basketball player
- Justin Harper (American football) (born 1985), American football player
- Justin Harper (basketball) (born 1989), American basketball player
- Justin Harrison, Australian rugby player
- Justin Hartley (born 1977), American actor
- Justin Hawkins, frontman for the English glam rock band The Darkness
- Justin Hayward (born 1946), English musician; vocalist, songwriter and guitarist for The Moody Blues
- Justin Hemmes (born 1972/73), Australian businessman
- Justin Henry (born 1971), American actor
- Justin Herbert (born 1998), American football player
- Justin Herron (born 1995), American football player
- Justin Hilliard (born 1998), American football player
- Justin Hodges, Australian rugby league footballer
- Justin Holl (born 1992), American ice hockey defenceman
- Justin Hollins (born 1996), American football player
- Justin Horo, New Zealand rugby league player
- Justin Houston, American football player
- Justin Humphreys, American film historian
- Justin Hunt (filmmaker), American documentary filmmaker
- Justin Hunt (rugby league), Australian rugby league footballer
- Justin Jackson (disambiguation), multiple people
- Justin James (basketball) (born 1997), American basketball player
- Justin Jayasuriya, Sri Lankan Sinhala navy rear admiral
- Justin Jefferson (born 1999), American football player
- Justin Joly (born 2004), American football player
- Justin Jones (disambiguation), multiple people
- Justin Kane, Australian boxer
- Justin Kirk (born 1969), American actor
- Justin Knapp, Wikipedia editor
- Justin Koduah (born 1982), Ghanaian lawyer and politician
- Justin Lamson (born 2002), American football player
- Justin Lawler (born 1994), American football player
- Justin Lawrence (disambiguation), multiple people
- Justin Layne (born 1998), American football player
- Justin Lewis (disambiguation), multiple people
- Justin Lin, Taiwanese American director
- Justin Lo (born 1976), Hong Kong singer
- Justin Long (born 1978), American actor
- Justin Madubuike (born 1997), American football player
- Justin Maese (born 1996), American professional baseball player
- Justin Marshall, New Zealand rugby player and pundit
- Justin Martindale, American comedian
- Justin McElroy (born 1980), American podcaster and co-founder of Polygon
- Justin Meccage (born 1980), American baseball coach
- Justin Moon, Korean-born American businessman and firearms designer; son of Unification Church founder Sun Myung Moon
- Justin Moore, American country singer
- Justin Morneau, Canadian baseball player; first baseman for the Colorado Rockies
- Justin S. Morrill, U.S. Representative and Senator from Vermont and sponsor of the Land Grant College Act
- Justin Mylo, Dutch DJ and electronic music producer
- Justin Narayan, Australian youth pastor and chef
- Justin O'Dell, American clarinetist and professor
- Justin Osuji, Scottish music producer, singer and songwriter
- Justin Patton (born 1997), American basketball player in the Israeli Basketball Premier League
- Justin Phillips (disambiguation), multiple people
- Justin Phongsavanh (born 1997), American Paralympic athlete
- Justin Pieris Deraniyagala (1903–1967), Sri Lankan Sinhala painter
- Justin Courtney Pierre, singer in the band Motion City Soundtrack
- Justin Pitts, American basketball player
- Justin Prentice (born 1994), American actor
- Justin Prime, Dutch DJ, electronic music producer and sound engineer
- Justin Raimondo, American libertarian conservative author
- J. A. Rambukpota (1891–1955), Sri Lankan Sinhala politician
- Justin Rascati (born 1984), American football coach
- Justin Reid (born 1997), American football player
- Justin Rogers (disambiguation), multiple people
- Justin Roiland (born 1980), American voice actor
- Justin Roper, American football player
- Justin Rose, English golfer
- Justin Rosniak, Australian actor
- Justin Ryan, Scottish interior designer and television presenter
- Justin Francis Rigali, Cardinal Archbishop of Philadelphia
- Justin Ring, Canadian football player
- Justin Rohrwasser (born 1996), American football player
- Justin Samarasekera (1916–2003), Sri Lankan architect
- Justin Sambu (born 1999), Canadian football player
- Justin Senior (born 1994), American football player
- Justin Shafer, American baseball player
- Justin Shaffer (born 1998), American football player
- Justin Shenkarow (born 1980), American actor and voice actor
- Justin Shorter (born 2000), American football player
- Justin Simon (born 1996), American basketball player
- Justin Skule (born 1996), American football player
- Justin Smith (basketball) (born 1999), American basketball player
- Justin Smoak (born 1986), American baseball player
- Justin Staples (born 1989), American football player
- Justin Steele (born 1995), American baseball player
- Justin Strnad (born 1996), American football player
- Justin Sumpter (born 1996), American football player
- Justin Swift (born 1975), American football player
- Justin Theroux (born 1971), American actor
- Justin Thomas (disambiguation)
- Justin Tillman (born 1996), American basketball player in the Israeli Basketball Premier League
- Justin Timberlake (born 1981), American singer-songwriter, actor and record producer
- Justin Tipping, American film and television director
- Justin Topa (born 1991), American baseball player
- Justin Tornow, American dancer and choreographer
- Justin Tranter, singer for the band Semi Precious Weapons
- Justin Trudeau (born 1971), Canadian politician, 23rd Prime Minister of Canada
- Justin Tuck, American football player for the New York Giants
- Justin Tucker, American football placekicker for the Baltimore Ravens
- Justin Turner, American baseball player
- Justin Turner (rugby union), Australian rugby union footballer
- Justin Upton, American baseball player
- Justin Verlander (born 1983), American baseball player
- Justin Vernon, singer in the band Bon Iver
- Justin Viele, American baseball coach
- Justin Walley (American football) (born 2002), American football player
- Justin Watson (cricketer) (born 1998), South African cricketer
- Justin Watson (running back) (born 1975), American former National Football League player
- Justin Watson (wide receiver) (born 1996), American former National Football League player
- Justin Welby (born 1956), the 105th archbishop of Canterbury
- Justin Wijayawardhene (1904–1982), Sri Lankan teacher, author, and politician
- Justin Williams (disambiguation), multiple people
- Justin Wilson (disambiguation), multiple people
- Justin Wrobleski (born 2000), American baseball player
- Justin Yeager (born 1998), American baseball player
- Justin Yerbury (1974–2023), Australian scientist
- Justin Young (singer, born 1978), Hawaiian singer-songwriter
- Justin Young (singer, born 1987), English musician, singer, and songwriter

== Fictional characters ==
- Justin Barber, in the American soap opera The Bold and the Beautiful
- Justin Burton, in the British soap opera Hollyoaks
- Brother Justin Crowe, in the American television serial drama Carnivàle
- Justin Finch Fletchley, a Harry Potter character
- Justin (Grandia), protagonist of the video game Grandia
- Justin Hammer, a longstanding Iron Man villain
- Justin Kiriakis, on the American soap opera Days of Our Lives
- Justin Pitt, Elaine Benes's boss on Seinfeld
- Justin Russo (Wizards of Waverly Place), in the American sitcom Wizards of Waverly Place
- Justin Stewart, the Blue Turbo Ranger from Power Rangers Turbo
- Justin Suarez, in the American television series Ugly Betty
- Justin Taylor, in the American-Canadian television series Queer as Folk
