= Kahr PM series =

Kahr PM Series
- Type: Semi-automatic pistol
- Place of origin: United States

Production history
- Designer: Justin Moon
- Manufacturer: Kahr Arms
- Produced: 2004–Present
- Variants: see variants: PM9; PM40; PM45

Specifications
- Mass: 14 oz (400 g) (PM9); 15.8 oz (450 g) (PM40); 17.3 oz (490 g) (PM45)
- Length: 5.42 in (13.8 cm) (PM9); 5.47 in (13.9 cm) (PM40); 5.79 in (14.7 cm) (PM45)
- Barrel length: 3 in (7.6 cm) (PM9); 3 in (7.6 cm) (PM40); 3.24 in (8.2 cm) (PM45)
- Width: 0.9 in (2.3 cm) (PM9); 0.94 in (2.4 cm) (PM40); 1.01 in (2.6 cm) (PM45)
- Height: 4 in (10 cm) (PM9); 4 in (10 cm) (PM40); 4.49 in (11.4 cm) (PM45)
- Cartridge: 9×19mm; .40 S&W; .45 ACP
- Action: short recoil, locked breech, DAO
- Feed system: 6+1, 7+1 (9×19mm); 5+1, 6+1 (.40 S&W); 5+1 (.45 ACP)
- Sights: iron open fixed dot and bar combat; optional tritium night sights

The Kahr PM series (Polymer Micro) is a series of double action only (DAO) hammerless, striker-fired, short recoil operated, semi-automatic pistols manufactured by Kahr Arms. The target market for the PM line is the civilian concealed carry market, as well as being intended as backup weapons for law enforcement officers.

== Development ==
When the first Kahr pistols appeared on the market in 1994, they were constructed entirely of carbon steel. Early Kahr models such as the K9 were praised as well-made and solidly constructed, but criticized for their excessive weight, which is a disadvantage in a weapon intended for concealed carry. Kahr attempted to address these concerns by introducing pistols that were physically smaller, as well as a line of polymer framed models. The PM series combined both these approaches, introducing polymer framed pistols that were also the smallest Kahr models ever produced.

== Design features ==
PM series pistols are manufactured with stainless steel slides that ride on steel inserts within the polymer frames, preventing the wear which would otherwise be inherent with metal slide to plastic frame contact. The PM is available in 9×19mm (PM9), .40 S&W (PM40), and .45 ACP (PM45). The series is noted for being very no-nonsense and utilitarian in appearance, with black plastic grips and a brushed stainless or blackened Tungsten DLC (Diamond-Like Coating) stainless slides. Produced by applying a thin but tough protective coating, the DLC patina was labeled "Black Diamond" in early production and is valued for its lack of attention-catching light reflection in dim surroundings. DLC coatings also serve to protect the slide from oxidization, nicks and scrapes.

PM pistols are known for having very smooth and consistent DAO trigger pulls of approximately six pounds, and large and easy to see sights in various configurations including night sights. Simplified controls exemplified by the lack of a manual safety lever are also positive attributes and contribute to a desirable package for concealment use. The PM series is also noted for having a fully enclosed trigger draw bar. The engineering design work necessary to fit it inside the cramped space of the receiver resulted in several beneficial lockwork changes. One such change was that the cartridge feed ramp had to be offset, which in turn allowed the overall receiver design to be thinner, it also permitted the slide to be squatter with a low bore axis, resulting is less muzzle rise and flip. The PM barrel configuration boasts polygonal rifling, which in theory will wear longer and gather less fouling.

Almost all Kahr pistol designs share a common function and trigger action.

== Criticisms ==
While highly regarded overall, reviewers have offered various criticisms of the PM series. The entire PM product line is known for requiring a 'breaking-in' period. Kahr Arms has indicated that its products are to be broken in with at least 200 rounds fired initially, as is the case with many semi-automatic firearms. In addition, though the 9×19mm PM9 has the reputation of being controllable with some minor modification of firing techniques, the .40 and .45 caliber variants are known to produce gun-handling difficulties in rapid fire due to their heavier recoil and resulting muzzle rise. In response to this criticism, some reviewers have observed that very small and light large bore pistols in general share this reputation, suggesting that they are best wielded by experienced and proficient shooters who practice regularly. Other known PM series deficiencies include excessive trigger travel, and a magazine release which occasionally fails to allow magazines to fall freely on the PM40 model. The magazine release and recoil springs on the PM40 pistol have also been known to occasionally break.

== Variants ==
=== PM9 ===
The Kahr PM9 is chambered in 9×19 Parabellum. It comes standard with either a black frame and stainless slide, or fully matte black. Additional features available on some models are tritium night sights and Crimson Trace laser sights.

A special model also features a manual safety and a loaded chamber indicator. These added features make the pistol approved for sale in Massachusetts.

=== PM9 Covert ===
The Kahr PM9 Covert was released in 2019 and like the Kahr PM9 is also chambered in 9x19 Parabellum. It comes standard with a black frame and fully matte black slide. Additional features include tritium night sights.

The primary difference between the PM9 and the PM9 Covert model is that the Covert model has the same grip and frame length, and thus the added additional round capacity, of the Kahr P9. The PM9 Covert also thereby has the additional grip space for most users to be able to secure a full handed grip on the firearm.

=== PM40 ===
The Kahr PM40 is chambered in .40 S&W. It comes standard with either a black frame and stainless slide, or fully matte black. Additional features available on some models are tritium night sights and Crimson Trace laser sights.

A special model also features a manual safety and a loaded chamber indicator. These added features make the pistol approved for sale in Massachusetts.

=== PM45 ===
The Kahr PM45 is chambered in .45 ACP. It comes standard with either a black frame and stainless slide, or fully matte black. Additional features available on some models are tritium night sights and Crimson Trace laser sights.

A special model also features a manual safety and a loaded chamber indicator. These added features make the pistol approved for sale in Massachusetts.
