= Yustinus =

Yustinus is a masculine Indonesian given name. It is Indonesian for Justin or Justinian. Notable people with the name include:

- Yustinus Murib (died 2003), West Papuan independence rebel leader
- Yustinus Pae (born 1983), Indonesian footballer
