= Justa =

Justa may refer to:

- Justa (rebel), also known as Justasa, Samaritan rebel
- JUSTA, Yugoslav airline company from the 1940s
- A name attributed to the gentile, Syro-Phoenician or Canaanite woman whose daughter was healed by Jesus according to Mark 7:24-30
- Saint Justa of Cagliari (d. 130) - see Justa, Justina and Henedina
- Saint Justa (3rd century) - see Justa and Rufina
- Justa Grata Honoria
- Santa Justa (disambiguation), multiple uses

== See also ==
- Justa stove
- Justus
- Justina (disambiguation)
- Justas, a Lithuanian masculine given name
