= Iestyn =

Iestyn is a Welsh masculine given name, equivalent to Justin. Notable people with the name include:

- Iestyn (saint), Welsh saint of the 6th or 7th centuries
- Justinian of Ramsey Island, 6th-century hermit
- Iestyn Davies, British opera singer
- Iestyn ap Gwrgant (1045–1093), the last ruler of the Welsh kingdom of Morgannwg
- Iestyn Edwards, stage and TV writer/performer, published poet and journalist
- Iestyn Harris (born 1976), Welsh professional rugby league footballer
- Iestyn Thomas (born 1976), Welsh rugby union footballer
- Rhydderch ap Iestyn (died 1033), king of Gwent and Morgannwg in south Wales
