= Justinas =

Justinas is a masculine Lithuanian given name, equivalent to Justin. Notable people with the name include:

- Justinas Beržanskis (born 1989), Lithuanian steeplechase runner
- Justinas Januševskij (born 1994), Lithuanian footballer
- Justinas Kinderis (born 1987), Lithuanian modern pentathlete
- Justinas Lagunavičius (1924–1997), Lithuanian basketball player
- Justinas Marazas (born 2000), Lithuanian footballer
- Justinas Marcinkevičius (1930–2011), Lithuanian poet and playwright
- Justinas Pranaitis (1861–1917), Lithuanian Catholic priest
- Justinas Staugaitis (1866–1943), Lithuanian Roman Catholic bishop, politician, educator and writer
- Justinas Usonis (born 1975), Lithuanian lawyer and legal scholar
