= Kahr P series =

Kahr P Series
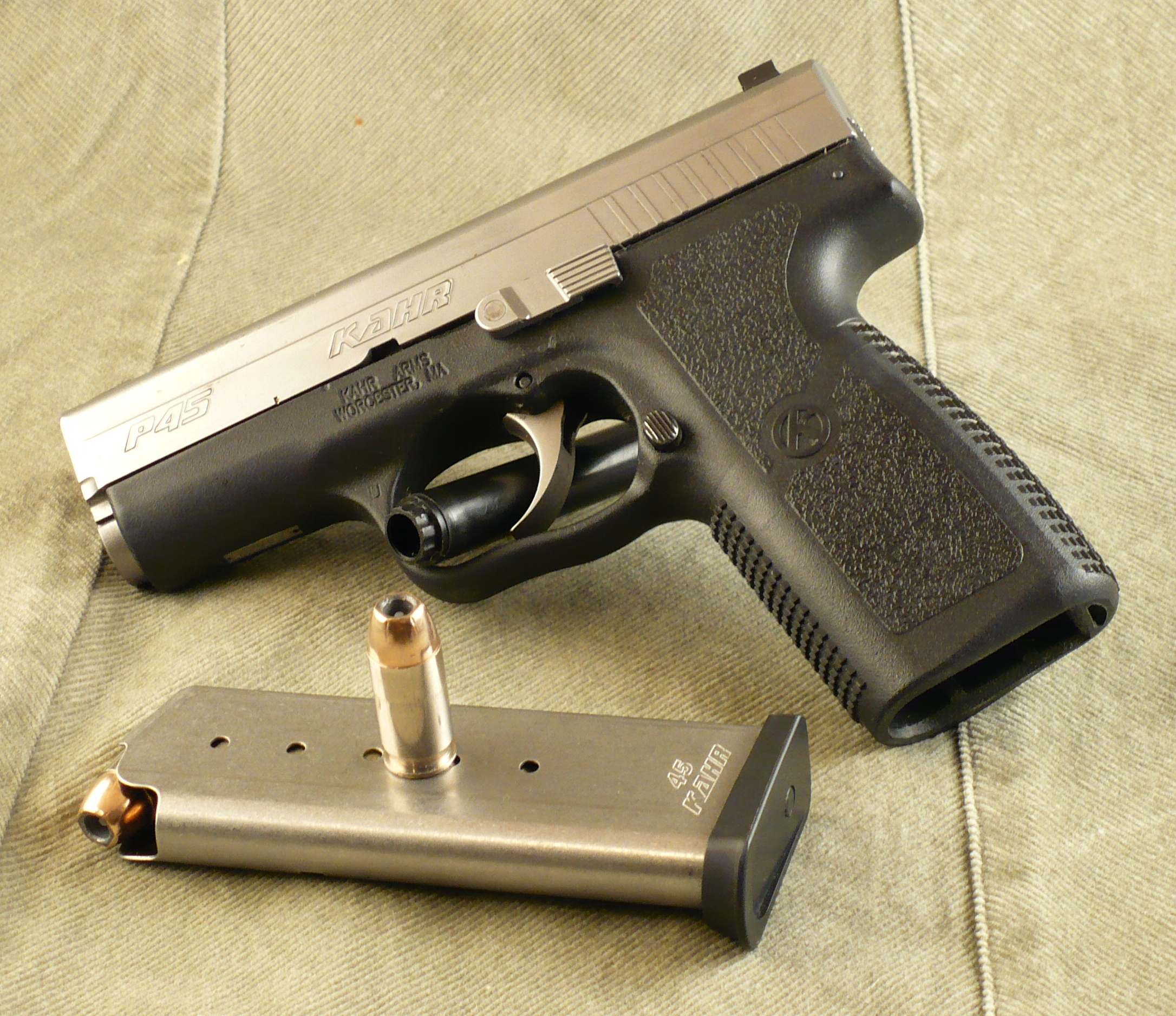
- Kahr P45 with magazine
- Type: Semi-automatic pistol
- Place of origin: United States

Production history
- Designer: Justin Moon
- Manufacturer: Kahr Arms
- Produced: 1999-Present
- Variants: See variants: P380; P9; P40; P45

Specifications
- Mass: 283 g (9.97 oz) (P380); 430 g (15 oz) (P9); 480 g (16.8 oz) (P40); 520 g (18.5 oz) (P45)
- Length: 12.4 cm (4.90 in) (P380); 15 cm (5.8 in) (P9); 15 cm (6.1 in) (P40); 15.4 cm (6.07 in) (P45)
- Barrel length: 6.4 cm (2.53 in) (P380); 9.06 cm (3.565 in) (P9); 9.1 cm (3.6 in) (P40); 9.0 cm (3.54 in) (P45)
- Width: 1.9 cm (0.75 in) (P380); 2.3 cm (0.9 in) (P9); 2.4 cm (0.94 in) (P40); 2.6 cm (1.01 in) (P45)
- Height: 9.9 cm (3.90 in) (P380); 11 cm (4.5 in) (P9); 11.6 cm (4.55 in) (P40); 12 cm (4.8 in) (P45)
- Caliber: .380 ACP; 9×19mm; .40 S&W; .45 ACP
- Action: Short-recoil locked breech, DAO
- Feed system: 6+1 (.380 Auto, .40 S&W, .45 ACP); 7+1 (9×19mm)
- Sights: Various, depends on model

The Kahr P series is a product line of double action only (DAO) hammerless, striker-fired, short recoil operated, semi-automatic pistols manufactured by Kahr Arms. The target market for the P line is the civilian concealed carry firearms market, as well as being intended as backup weapons for law enforcement officers.

== Development ==
When the first Kahr pistols appeared on the market in 1994 they were constructed entirely of carbon steel. Early Kahr models such as the K9 were praised as well-made and solidly constructed, but criticized for their excessive weight, which is a disadvantage in a weapon intended for concealed carry. Kahr attempted to address these concerns by introducing a line of polymer framed models.

== Design features ==
As noted above, P series pistols are manufactured with stainless steel slides that ride on steel inserts within the polymer frames, preventing the wear which would otherwise be inherent with metal slide to plastic frame contact. Available ammunition chamberings include .380 ACP (P380), 9×19mm (P9), .40 S&W (P40), and .45 ACP (P45). P series pistols are noted for being very no-nonsense and utilitarian in appearance, with black plastic grips and a brushed stainless or blackened Tungsten TLC stainless slides. Produced by applying a thin but tough protective coating, the TLC patina was labeled "Black Diamond" in early production, and is valued for its lack of attention-catching light reflection in dim surroundings. TLC coatings also serve to protect the slide from oxidization, nicks and scrapes.

P pistols are known for having very smooth and consistent DAO trigger pulls of approximately six pounds, and large and easy to see sights in various configurations, including night sights. Simplified controls exemplified by the lack of a manual safety lever are also positive attributes and contribute to a desirable package for concealment use.

The P series is also noted for having a fully enclosed trigger transfer bar. The engineering design work necessary to fit it inside the cramped space of the receiver resulted in several beneficial lockwork changes. One such change was that the cartridge feed ramp had to be offset, which in turn allowed the overall receiver design to be thinner; it also permitted the slide to be more squat with a low bore axis, resulting is less muzzle rise and flip. The P barrel configuration boasts polygonal rifling, which in theory will last longer and gather less fouling. Overall, an important innate advantage of the Kahr pistol design is that it is identical in function and trigger action across virtually all Kahr models, meaning that once a user becomes familiar with the handling characteristics and feel of one model, the learning curve for mastery of other Kahr firearms is much shorter.

== Variants ==
=== P380 ===
The Kahr P380, chambered in .380 Auto, comes in three main styles: all matte black, black frame with a stainless slide, and a custom engraved Black Rose edition. All three styles come standard with drift adjustable, white bar-dot combat sights but can also be purchased with drift adjustable tritium night sights. The P380 can also be purchased with a loaded chamber indicator.

=== P9 ===
The Kahr P9 chambered in 9×19mm is the original model in the P series. Like other models it comes in two main styles; all matte black or black frame with a stainless slide. Both styles come standard with drift adjustable, white bar-dot combat sights but can also be purchased with drift adjustable tritium night sights. The P9 can also be purchased with an external safety and a loaded chamber indicator. These added features make it approved for sale in Massachusetts.

=== P40 ===
The Kahr P40 chambered in .40 S&W comes in two main styles; all matte black or black frame with a stainless slide. Both styles come standard with drift adjustable, white bar-dot combat sights but can also be purchased with drift adjustable tritium night sights. The P40 can also be purchased with an external safety and a loaded chamber indicator.

=== P45 ===
The Kahr P45 chambered in .45 ACP comes in two different styles; all matte black or black frame with a stainless slide. Both styles come standard with drift adjustable, white bar-dot combat sights but can also be purchased with drift adjustable tritium night sights.

== CW Budget Line ==
Kahr also offers the CW series of pistols, which are budget versions of the P series. The CW series is available in .380 ACP, 9×19mm, .40 S&W caliber, and .45 ACP caliber.

The major differences between the CW series and the P series are: The CW series uses barrels with conventional rifling, rather than the polygonal rifling employed by the P series. The CW series has a pinned-in front sight, rather than the drift-adjustable dovetail front sight on the P series. Pistols in the CW series are slightly larger than their counterparts in the P series. The CW series have fewer machined contours, and the slide stop is constructed using metal injection molding rather than machined.
