= Rod of Iron Ministries =

Korean-American religious organization

Rod of Iron Ministries (or currently shortened as the Sanctuary Church; originally known as the World Peace and Unification Sanctuary Church) is a schismatic offshoot of the Unification Church established by Hyung Jin "Sean" Moon and Kook-jin "Justin" Moon. Both of them are sons of Sun Myung Moon and Hak Ja Han. Their father was the founder of the Unification Church and its leader until his death in 2012. Hyung Jin "Sean" Moon is the group's current leader.

The group exalts the AR-15 semiautomatic rifle in its ceremonies, believing it represents the "rod of iron" mentioned in the Book of Revelation that Jesus would use to assert his authority during end times. Originating in Newfoundland, Pennsylvania in 2017, it has attracted attention from some right-wing antigovernment American groups and individuals who anticipate a coming civil war in the United States. Sean Moon hosts a webcast during which he discusses reports from sources such as Breitbart News and InfoWars. The Southern Poverty Law Center characterizes the organization as an "antigovernment Christian gun cult."

== History ==
The Rod of Iron Ministries was formed as the result of a dispute between Sean Moon and his mother following the death of Sun Myung Moon. This led Sean and his wife to separate from the Unification Church and establish an offshoot sect named World Peace and Unification Sanctuary Church in early 2013.

In 2015, Sean began renouncing his mother as the 'Whore of Babylon', saying she was no longer a "True Mother". He also began teaching that Hyun Shil Kang, one of Sun Myung Moon's first disciples, was now True Mother instead, as his spirit had married her. He and his wife Yeon Ah Lee also began assuming the titles "Second King" and "Second Queen" respectively.

Sean is supported by his elder brother Kook-Jin "Justin" Moon, who effectively serves as assistant pastor of the church. He also owns Kahr Arms, a small arms manufacturer.

By 2018, Sean began wearing a coronet of bullets on his head and expressing a more militant and pro-gun rights ideology. Sanctuary Church assumed the name Rod of Iron Ministries and performed religious rituals that heavily involved the AR-15 semiautomatic rifle. In October 2019, members of the group were invited to "show their willingness to defend their families, communities and nation" by bringing their rifles to a service in which their weapons were blessed.

In 2021, Sean Moon and the Sanctuary Church bought and moved to a compound 40 miles from Waco, Texas. Upon moving to the compound they continued to espouse a highly militant ideology. Later that year it was reported that Moon and the Sanctuary Church had bought a 130-acre property in Grainger County, Tennessee, to serve as the church's retreat center.

Sean Moon and other members of the group participated in the January 6, 2021 United States Capitol attack.

Former Donald Trump national security advisor Michael Flynn addressed an October 2024 Rod of Iron Freedom Festival, saying that if Trump won the 2024 presidential election, "Katie, bar the door. Believe me, the gates of hell — my hell — will be unleashed." Flynn's close associate Ivan Raiklin urged attendees to "confront" their state representatives with "evidence of the illegitimate steal" should Trump lose. Raiklin had previously characterized himself as Trump's "Secretary of Retribution" and said he had prepared a "Deep State Target List" of over 350 people he would go after in a second Trump administration.
