= Kahr K series =

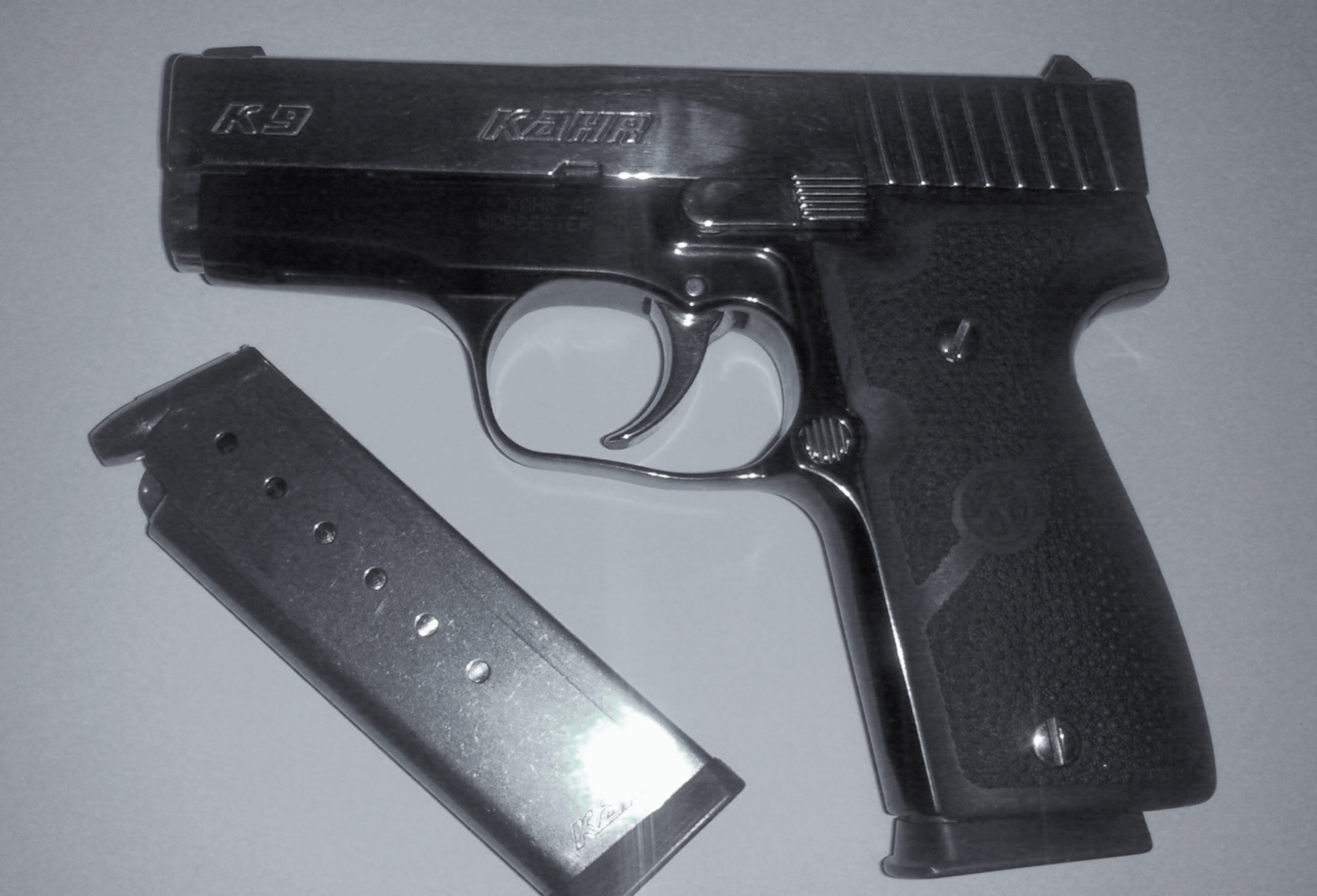
- Kahr K9
- Type: Semi-automatic pistol
- Place of origin: United States

Production history
- Designer: Justin Moon
- Manufacturer: Kahr Arms
- Produced: 1996–present
- Variants: see variants: K9; K40

Specifications
- Mass: 23.1 oz (650 g) (K9); 24.1 oz (680 g) (K40)
- Length: 6 in (15 cm) (K9); 6.1 in (15 cm) (K40)
- Barrel length: 3.5 in (8.9 cm) (K9); 3.5 in (8.9 cm) (K40)
- Width: 0.9 in (2.3 cm) (K9); 0.94 in (2.4 cm) (K40)
- Height: 4.5 in (11 cm) (K9); 4.55 in (11.6 cm) (K40)
- Cartridge: 9×19mm Parabellum; .40 S&W
- Action: Locked-breech
- Feed system: 7+1 (9×19mm Parabellum); 6+1 (.40 S&W)
- Sights: fixed open sights

The Kahr K series is a series of semi-automatic pistols manufactured by Kahr Arms. The original weapon in the series, the K9, was introduced in 1995 and features a double action only (DAO) trigger mechanism with a Locked breech recoil operated action. It was intended to address the police backup / off duty and civilian concealed carry markets.

With a reputation for both quality of construction and reliability since its introduction the pistol has remained popular with both the police and civilian markets. In 1998 it was approved for off duty and backup carry by the New York City Police Department (NYPD) but as of December 2011, the Kahr K9 is no longer authorized by the NYPD as Kahr Arms was not able to increase the trigger pull to the NYPD specifications. Its light trigger was blamed for over a dozen recent accidental discharges, none fatal. Since its introduction the pistol’s design and construction have undergone a number of improvements including slightly increased chamber dimensions and the use of a Teflon electroless nickel composite material for some of the internal moving parts which improved reliability.

Options offered with the K9 include tritium night sights, and wood Hogue grips. The Elite version of the pistol offers a polished feed ramp, polished and deburred slide, beveled magazine well, and enlarged trigger with a smoother action.

== Features ==
- 100% steel construction (no aluminum alloys or polymer)
  - 4140 high-carbon steel alloy frame
  - 4130 chromoly steel slide
- Barrel, recoil lug, and feed ramp machined from one piece of steel
- Smooth 8-pound double-action-only trigger
- Lack of external safety lever for increased speed and simplicity also offers less chance of snagging on clothes
- Patented off-set recoil lug design results in reduced muzzle flip and perceived recoil due to low center line axis.
- Ergonomic curved Hogue rubber grips which help dampen recoil
- California specification passive firing pin block drop safety which prevents accidental firing if the pistol falls

== Variants ==
=== K9 ===
The Kahr K9 model is the original in the K series. The standard model features a stainless steel construction, locked breech, passive striker block and no magazine disconnect. It can also be purchased with a matte black finish. Both models feature drift adjustable, white bar-dot combat sights but can be upgraded to tritium night sights.

A K9 Elite model was also introduced by Kahr which features a polished stainless steel finish and laser etching on the frame.

=== K40 ===
The Kahr K40 model, like the K9, comes standard with a stainless steel construction, locked breech, passive striker block and no magazine disconnect. It can also be purchased with a matte black finish. Both models feature drift adjustable, white bar-dot combat sights but can be upgraded to tritium night sights.

A K40 Elite model was also introduced by Kahr which features a polished stainless steel finish and laser etching on the frame.

The K40 has been removed from the line up.

== Appearance in film and television ==
A Kahr K9 was used by Jodie Foster's character in the 2007 film The Brave One.

The Kahr K9 was also used to assassinate Phil Leotardo by Walden Belfiore in the television series The Sopranos, played by Frank John Hughes.

In the television series Blue Bloods, Danny Reagan uses a Kahr K9 as his sidearm.

The Kahr K9 was used by Hiroyuki Sanada’s character, Kenji in the film Rush Hour 3.

The Kahr K9 was used by both Lanna and her Sociopath son of Bloody Face, Johnny... in Season 2, Episode 13 of American Horror Stories, Asylum.

The Kahr K9 is used by Casey Affleck's character in the tense bar scene in the film Gone Baby Gone (2007), directed by his brother Ben Affleck.
