= Kahr MK series =

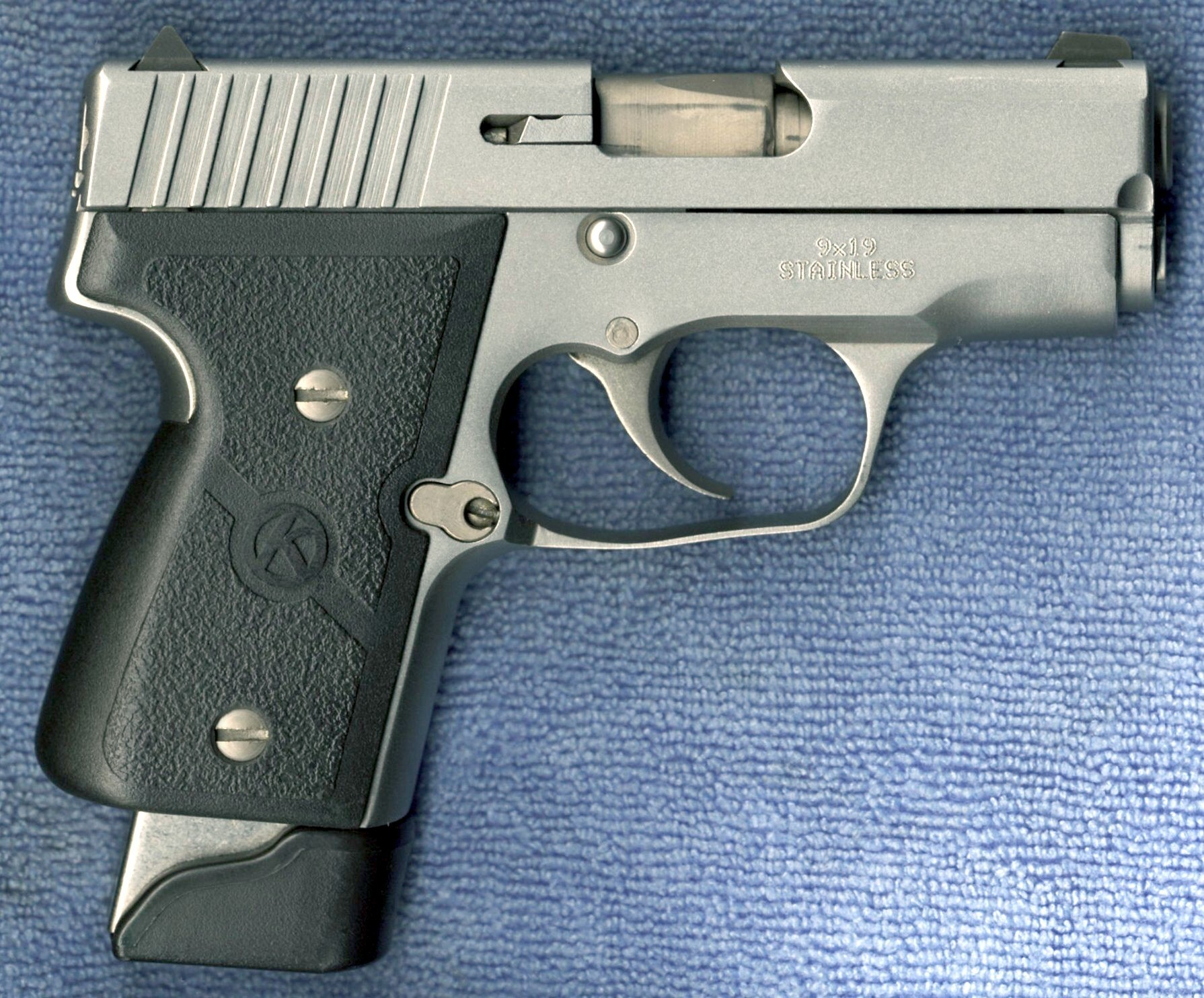
- Kahr MK9 - Stainless with extended mag.
- Type: Semi-automatic pistol
- Place of origin: United States

Production history
- Manufacturer: Kahr Arms
- Produced: 1999–Present
- Variants: see variants: MK9; MK40

Specifications
- Mass: 22.1 oz (630 g) (MK9); 23.1 oz (650 g) (MK40)
- Length: 5.3 in (13 cm) (MK9); 5.35 in (13.6 cm) (MK40)
- Barrel length: 3 in (7.6 cm) (MK9); 3 in (7.6 cm) (MK40)
- Width: 0.9 in (2.3 cm) (MK9); 0.94 in (2.4 cm) (MK40)
- Height: 4 in (10 cm) (MK9); 4 in (10 cm) (MK40)
- Cartridge: 9×19mm; .40 S&W
- Action: Locked-breech
- Feed system: 6+1, 7+1 (9×19mm); 5+1, 6+1 (.40 S&W)
- Sights: Drift adjustable, combat sights; Drift adjustable, tritium night sights

The Kahr MK Series is a series of pistols manufactured by Kahr Arms.

== Variants ==
In 2003, Kahr Arms introduced Elite versions of the MK9 and MK40. The elite variants feature a polished stainless steel finish, laser etching on the slide, beveled magazine, and a polished feed ramp.
