= Iustin =

Iustin is a Romanian-language masculine given name that may refer to:

- Iustin Doicaru (born 2007), Romanian footballer
- Iustin Dyadkovsky (1784–1841), Russian physician, psychotherapist, rationalist, natural philosopher and Moscow University professor
- Iustin Frățiman (1870–1927), Russian Empire/Romanian historian, educator, librarian and political figure
- Iustin Moisescu or Patriarch Iustin of Romania (1910–1986), former Patriarch of the Romanian Orthodox Church
- Iustin Popescu (born 1993), Romanian footballer
- Justin Popović (1894–1979), sometimes spelled Iustin, Serbian Orthodox theologian, archimandrite of the Ćelije Monastery, Dostoyevsky scholar, writer, anti-communist advocate and critic of the pragmatic church ecclesiastical life
- Iustin Răducan (born 2005), Romanian footballer

== See also ==
- Justin (given name)
