= Jestin =

Jestin or Jestina is a given name, a variant of Justin, and may refer to:

- Jestin Coler, founder of Disinfomedia
- Jestin George (born 1998), Indian professional footballer
- Jestina Mukoko, Zimbabwean human rights activist
- Justinian of Ramsey Island, 6th-century hermit

== See also ==
- Jestyn (disambiguation)
