= Jestyn =

Jestyn is a given name, a variant of Justin, and may refer to:

- Iestyn ap Gwrgant (1014–1093), ruler of Morgannwg
- Jestyn Murphy (born 1996), Canadian curler
- Jestyn Philipps, 2nd Viscount St Davids (1917–1991), British peer

== See also ==
- Jestin (disambiguation)
