= Giustino =

Giustino may refer to:

== People ==
- Giustino Durano (1923–2002), Italian movie actor
- Giustino Episcopio (fl. 1594), Italian painter of history and sacred subjects
- Giustino Fortunato (1777–1862), Italian magistrate and politician
- Giustino Fortunato (1848–1932), Italian historian and politician
- Giustino de Jacobis (1800–1860), Italian Roman Catholic bishop
- Giustino Menescardi (1720–1776), Italian painter and scenic designer
- Giustino Russolillo (1891–1955), Italian Roman Catholic priest
- Lorenzo Giustino (born 1991), Italian tennis player

== Operas ==
- Giustino (Legrenzi), a 1683 opera by Giovanni Legrenzi
- Giustino, a 1703 opera by Domenico Scarlatti
- Giustino, a 1711 lost opera by Tomaso Albinoni
- Giustino (Vivaldi), a 1724 opera by Antonio Vivaldi
- Giustino (Handel), a 1737 opera by George Frideric Handel

== Other uses ==
- Giustino, Trentino, a town in Italy

== See also ==
- San Giustino, a comune (municipality) in Italy
- San Giustino (church), a church in Rome
