= Kahr Arms =

American firearms manufacturer

- Company type: Private
- Industry: Firearms
- Founded: 1995; 31 years ago in Blauvelt, New York
- Headquarters: Greeley, Pennsylvania
- Key people: Justin Moon, CEO/President
- Parent: Kahr Firearms Group
- Website: kahr.com

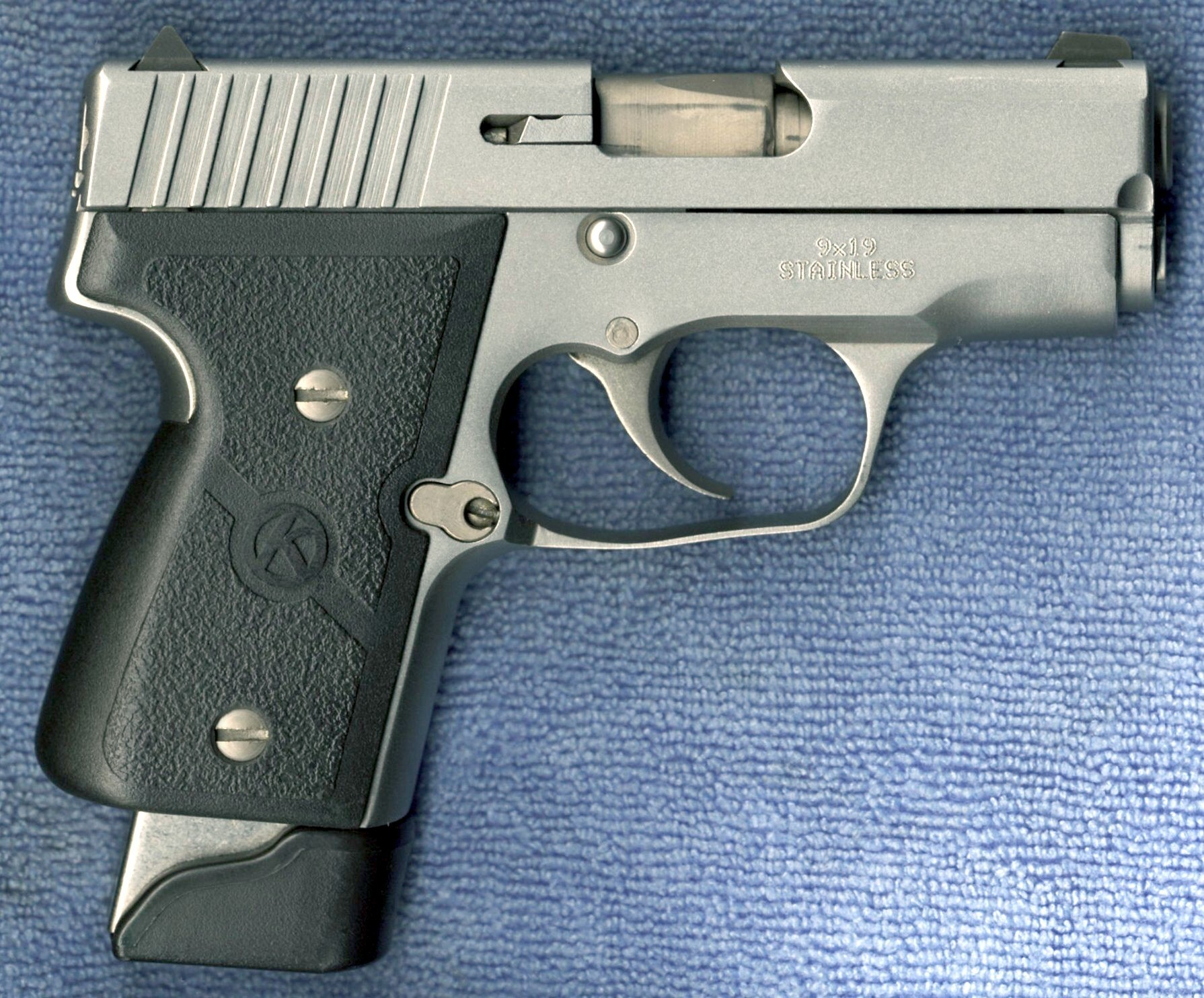
Kahr MK9

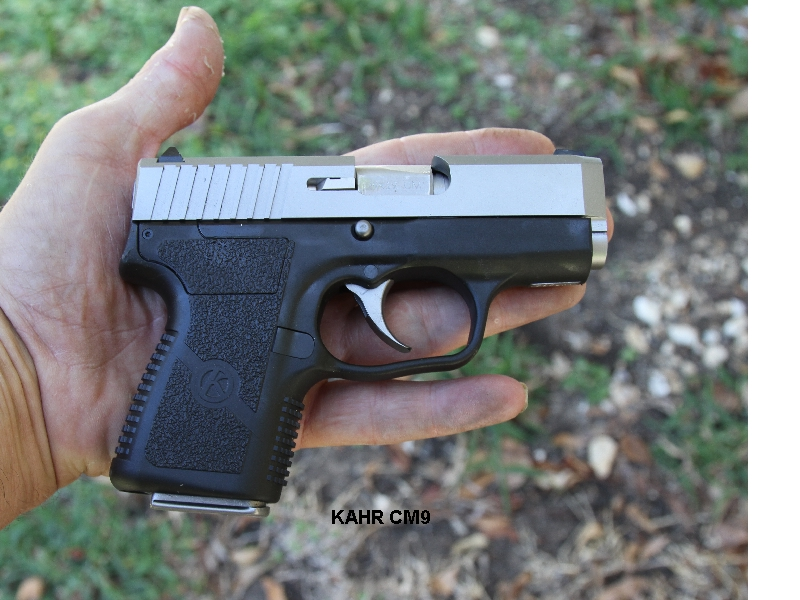
Kahr CM9 subcompact 9×19mm

Kahr Arms is an American small firearms manufacturer focused on compact and mid-size semi-automatic pistols chambered for popular cartridges, including .380 ACP, 9mm Luger, .40 S&W and .45 ACP. Kahr pistols feature polymer or stainless steel frames, single-stack magazines, and double-action-only striker firing actions. Kahr Arms is part of the Kahr Firearms Group, a US-based firearms manufacturer, which also includes Thompson Auto-Ordnance and Magnum Research. The Kahr Firearms Group company headquarters is in Greeley, Pennsylvania, with a manufacturing facility in Worcester, Massachusetts.

Kahr Arms was founded by Justin Moon, who is CEO and president. He is the son of Sun Myung Moon, founder of the Unification Church and brother to Hyung Jin Moon, pastor of the Rod of Iron Ministries, which is known to hold blessing ceremonies for AR-15 rifles.

== History ==
At age 18, Justin Moon obtained a license to carry a handgun, but he could not find an ultra-compact 9mm pistol with the features he desired, so he designed one himself in his junior year of college.

In 1999, Kahr Arms bought Auto-Ordnance Company, not associated with the original AOC, maker of Thompson submachine guns, then owned and operated by Numrich Arms who had bought the crated assets of Auto-Ordnance started by General John T. Thompson and his investors. Now Kahr manufactures Auto-Ordnance's line of semi-automatic weapons, including a long-barreled rifle version of the famous "Tommy Gun".

Kahr introduced its line of compact pistols at a time of significant liberalization of concealed weapons laws in many U.S. states. Since the 1990s, many states have passed "shall-issue" laws, as promoted by the National Rifle Association of America and other gun rights organizations. Such laws mandate that state authorities must issue permits to carry concealed weapons to all law-abiding applicants who met certain conditions set forth by state law, including passing a comprehensive background check.

In 1994, the U.S. government banned manufacture and importation of pistol magazines with more than a 10-round capacity. These were the so-called "high-capacity" magazines, which again became legal to manufacture and import in most states in September 2004, after the relevant federal law expired. This change in federal law rendered many staggered-magazine pistol models (commonly with magazine capacities of 15 or more rounds) less popular in the American market. They were now overly large in light of their newly mandated 10-shot limit.

Since late 2003 or very early in 2004, Kahr has changed from offering a Limited Lifetime Warranty on their pistols to one of only five years' duration. In 2003 the New York Daily News reported that the Kahr K9 was popular as a back-up weapon with New York City police officers, who called it the "Moonie gun".

In June 2010, Kahr bought Magnum Research, which markets the Desert Eagle.

During the Shot Show in January 2015, the Kahr Arms company changed its name to the Kahr Firearms Group. Kahr Arms is currently under the Kahr Firearms Group as a private firearms manufacturer, alongside Magnum Research and Auto-Ordnance. The company's trademarks include: Kahr Arms, Thompson, Auto-Ordnance, Magnum Research, BFR, and Desert Eagle.

In September 2019, Kahr Firearms Group donated eight Thin Blue Line PM9's to the NRA Law Enforcement Division, two of which were used as special Firearm Awards at the National Police Shooting Championships.

== New location ==
On July 1, 2013, the Kahr Arms company announced that it was leaving New York state because of New York's Secure Ammunition and Firearms Enforcement Act (NY SAFE Act) of 2013. Kahr purchased 620 acres (250 ha) in Pike County, Pennsylvania, and said it will move its corporate staff after building offices in 2014 with plans to build a new factory by 2019. The firearms group ceremoniously cut the ribbon at the grand opening of their new 40,000-square-foot (3,700 m^{2}) headquarters on August 11, 2015, in Blooming Grove Township, Pike County, Pennsylvania.

== Kahr design ==
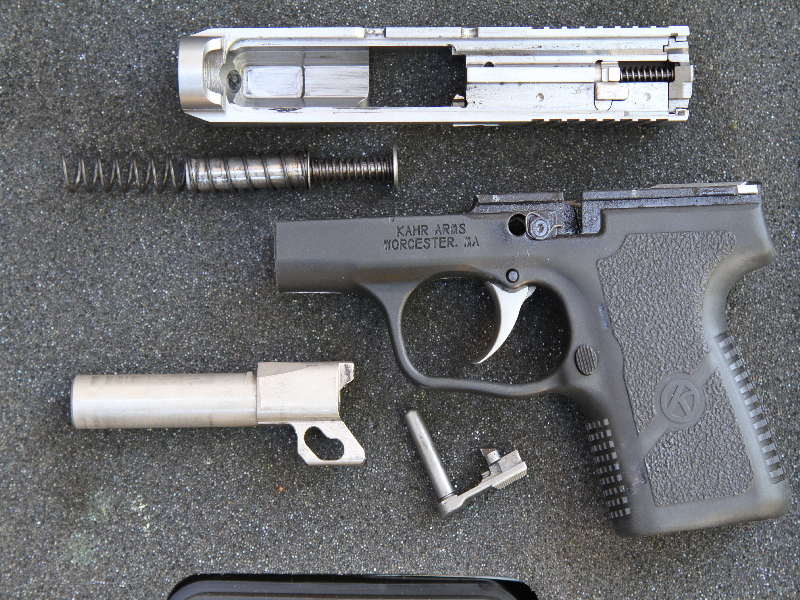
Polymer-frame Kahr CM9 field stripped for routine cleaning

The Kahr action is a Browning locked-breech design featuring a striker-operated firing pin with a passive firing pin safety, making it a true hammerless action.

Kahr's trigger is similar to a double-action revolver, with a short 3/8-inch (0.95 cm) trigger travel. On polymer-framed models, the slide travels on steel inserts that are permanently set into the polymer frame. There are also polymer rails, which are not structurally functional, but aid in keeping out dirt, and with aligning the slide when reassembling the slide onto the polymer frame. In steel framed versions, the rail design is traditional and very similar to that of the M1911 pistol. Kahr pistols have their feed ramps offset to the left, which allows the trigger draw bar to lie flatter against the right side of the frame. This feature helps the Kahr pistol line to achieve a slide width of .90 inches (2.3 cm) in 9mm and .40 S&W models, and 1.01 inches (2.6 cm) when chambered in .45 ACP, narrower than many popular pistols.

The initial Kahr offering, the K9, provided a full-power 9mm Parabellum pistol that was virtually the same size, and in some dimensions, smaller, as widely accepted "Pocket Pistol" .380 ACP and .32 ACP handguns such as the Walther PP and PPK/S, as well as the SIG Sauer P230/232, and the Beretta "80" Series.

Kahr offers a line of "economy" pistols which are identical to the P series of pistols except that some luxury features are eliminated to cut costs. The polymer-frame CW economy models have fewer machining operations, pinned-in front sights rather than dovetail, traditional rifling rather than polygonal rifling, "rolled-on" lettering rather than engraved, and come with only one magazine. CW pistols generally retail for approximately 20–30% less than the full-featured P series. The E series is a discontinued line of Kahr economy pistols with stainless frame; the E series was discontinued in 2004.

== Pistols ==
Kahr currently manufactures and distributes the following semi-automatic pistols:

		Value	S Series	Premium	
		Polymer			Steel
Small	.380 ACP	CW380		P380	
Small	9×19mm Parabellum	CM9		PM9	MK9
Small	.40 S&W	CM40		PM40	MK40
Small	.45 ACP	CM45		PM45	
Medium	.380 ACP	CT380			
Medium	9×19mm Parabellum	CW9	S9	P9	K9
Medium	.40 S&W	CW40		P40	K40
Medium	.45 ACP	CW45		P45	
Large	9×19mm Parabellum	CT9	ST9	TP9	T9
Large	.40 S&W	CT40		TP40	T40
Large	.45 ACP	CT45		TP45	
