= Justin O'Dell =

American clarinet player

Justin O'Dell (born 1974, Detroit, Michigan) is an American clarinetist, international concert artist, and orchestral and chamber musician. He earned degrees from Western Michigan University (BM), Yale University (MM), University of Michigan (DMA) with further studies at the Hochschule für Musik Karlsruhe in Germany.

O'Dell was appointed associate professor of clarinet by the Louisiana State University School of Music in 2005 where he taught until Spring 2008 He was appointed principal clarinetist of the Acadiana Symphony Orchestra in Lafayette, Louisiana in 2007.

He then assumed a position at Michigan State University's College of Music in the autumn of 2008, succeeding the retiring Elsa Ludewig-Verdehr, long serving professor of clarinet.

O’Dell is no longer on the faculty and no longer teaches at Michigan State University’s College of Music.

He won the gold medal and first prize at the 2007 Mercadante International Clarinet Competition with his Trio Sofia (together with Borislava Iltcheva (violin) and Akiko Konishi (piano), the first time the top prize was awarded in the competition's history.
