= Justin Wilson =

Justin Wilson may refer to:

- Justin Wilson (chef) (1914–2001), American chef and humorist
- Justin P. Wilson (born 1945), comptroller and former deputy governor of Tennessee
- Justin Wilson (racing driver) (1978–2015), British Formula One and IndyCar driver
- Justin Wilson (politician) (born 1979), American mayor of Alexandria, Virginia (2019–2025)
- Justin Wilson (baseball) (born 1987), MLB pitcher
- Justin Wilson (rugby union) (born 1978), New Zealand rugby player
