= Justin Rogers =

Justin Rogers may refer to:

- Justin Rogers (cornerback) (born 1988), American football player
- Justin Rogers (defensive tackle) (born 2001), American football player
- Justin Rogers (linebacker) (born 1983), American football player
