= Iestyn Edwards =

British comedian

Iestyn Edwards is a stage and TV writer/performer, published poet and journalist, best known for character Madame Galina, the Prima Ballerina, who most recently has entertained troops in Iraq and Afghanistan.

== Biography ==
Edwards trained at Southwark Cathedral, London, where he was awarded the Hammerstein Chantership, a medal donated by the widow of Oscar Hammerstein II. He also trained at the Guildhall School of Music and Drama, where he first played Madame Galina during Rag Week. Seasons followed with British Youth Opera as well as recitals at Southwark Cathedral, Loseley Hall and the Chelsea Arts Club. He held a singing tutorship at the Guildford School of Acting until he performed as Madame Galina at a private party at the Thorpeness Country Club and was spotted by club booker Emily Latham, who arranged for him to audition for Club Kabaret in the West End. Within a week he was onstage in front of Madonna, Jude Law and Kate Moss. Chance sightings of Madame Galina shows by various producers led to Edwards being showcased by Chrysalis TV, winning Busker Of The Year, and to The Big Breakfast covering his first Edinburgh Festival in 2001. He has been touring theatres ever since in Anything For A Tenor, Madame Galina Ballet Star Galactica/The New Forces' Sweetheart and Along Came Bill.

Edwards was featured by Ruby Wax in her BBC Three series Ruby Does The Business, and profiled by Artsworld and in Channel 4's All Sorts, his main TV credit is Madame Galina's Whirlwind Guide To Ballet, also Channel 4, a tie in with the four-part Rough Guide To Choreography, made by Sceptre Productions for Channel 4 and featuring George Piper Dances. His entry in the Rough Guide To Choreography book describes Madame Galina thus: "This oversized mock-Russian ballerina fabricates lovingly tart send-ups of classical technique, diva-style celebrity and all the attendant pretensions".

On Trafalgar Day 2005, he was asked by Admiral Sir Alan West, First Sea Lord, to sing in the Great Cabin of HMS Victory in the presence of Her Majesty The Queen. This brought him to the attention of Combined Services Entertainment, who took him out to Iraq and Afghanistan to entertain troops as Madame Galina in 2006. These tours were featured in The Times and the Mail On Sunday; and Woman's Hour, Radio 4, featured Madame Galina in a programme tracing the history of the Forces sweetheart.

Edwards' autobiographical play Along Came Bill won a retrospective award at the Bath Festival in 2003.

Libby Purves writing in The Times in 2006 described Edwards's work as a synthesis of art and larkiness, Cirque du Soleil talent scout Waltidor saw Galina as a modern take on the white face circus clown, and author Robert Mawson believes that Edwards suffers from the classic Cinderella Complex and is working this out in his writing and performing.
