= Justo =

Justo (Spanish pronunciation: ['xus.to]) is a Spanish surname and male given name meaning just, i.e. fair.

== Given name ==
Notable people with this given name include:

- Justo Albarracín (born 1951), Argentine equestrian
- Justo Almario (born 1949), Colombian musician
- Justo José Caraballo (1914–2003), Argentine swimmer
- Justo Daract (1804–1887), Argentine politician
- Justo de Santa María de Oro (1772–1836), Argentine statesman and bishop
- Justo Figuerola (1770–1854), Peruvian president
- Justo Gallego Martínez (born 1925), Spanish monk
- Justo Giani (born 1999), Argentine football player
- Justo Iturralde (1905–1981), Argentine equestrian
- Justo Jacquet (born 1961), Paraguayan football player
- Justo Jorge Padrón (1943–2021), Spanish poet, essayist and translator
- Justo José de Urquiza (1801–1870), Argentine general and politician
- Justo L. González (born 1937), Cuban theologist
- Justo Oscar Laguna (1929–2011), Argentine bishop
- Justo Pastor Lynch (1755–1830), Argentine landowner
- Justo Lorente (born 1994), Nicaraguan football player
- Justo Páez Molina (1902–1969), Argentine politician
- Justo Pastor Benítez (1897–1963), Paraguayan historian and politician
- Justo Perelló (born 1939), Cuban javelin thrower
- Justo Rufino Barrios (1835–1885), Guatemalan politician
- Justo Sierra (1848–1912), Mexican writer
- Justo Suárez (1909–1938), Argentine boxer
- Justo Tejada (born 1933), Spanish football player
- Justo Takayama (1552–1615), Japanese Christian and samurai
- Justo Villar (born 1977), Paraguayan football player

Middle name

- Antonio Justo Alcibar (born 1944), Argentine football player
- José Justo Corro (1794-1864), Mexican president
- José Justo Milla (1794–1838), Honduran military leader

== Surname ==
Notable people with this surname include:

- Agustín Pedro Justo (1876–1943), Argentine president
- Alicia Moreau de Justo (1885–1986), Argentine physician and politician
- Juan B. Justo (1865–1928), Argentine physician, journalist and politician
- Sara Justo (1870–1941), Argentine women's rights activist and dentist
- Virginia Justo (born 1963), Argentine chess master
