= Greeley, Pennsylvania =

Unincorporated community in Pennsylvania, US

Coordinates: 41°25′16″N 74°59′43″W

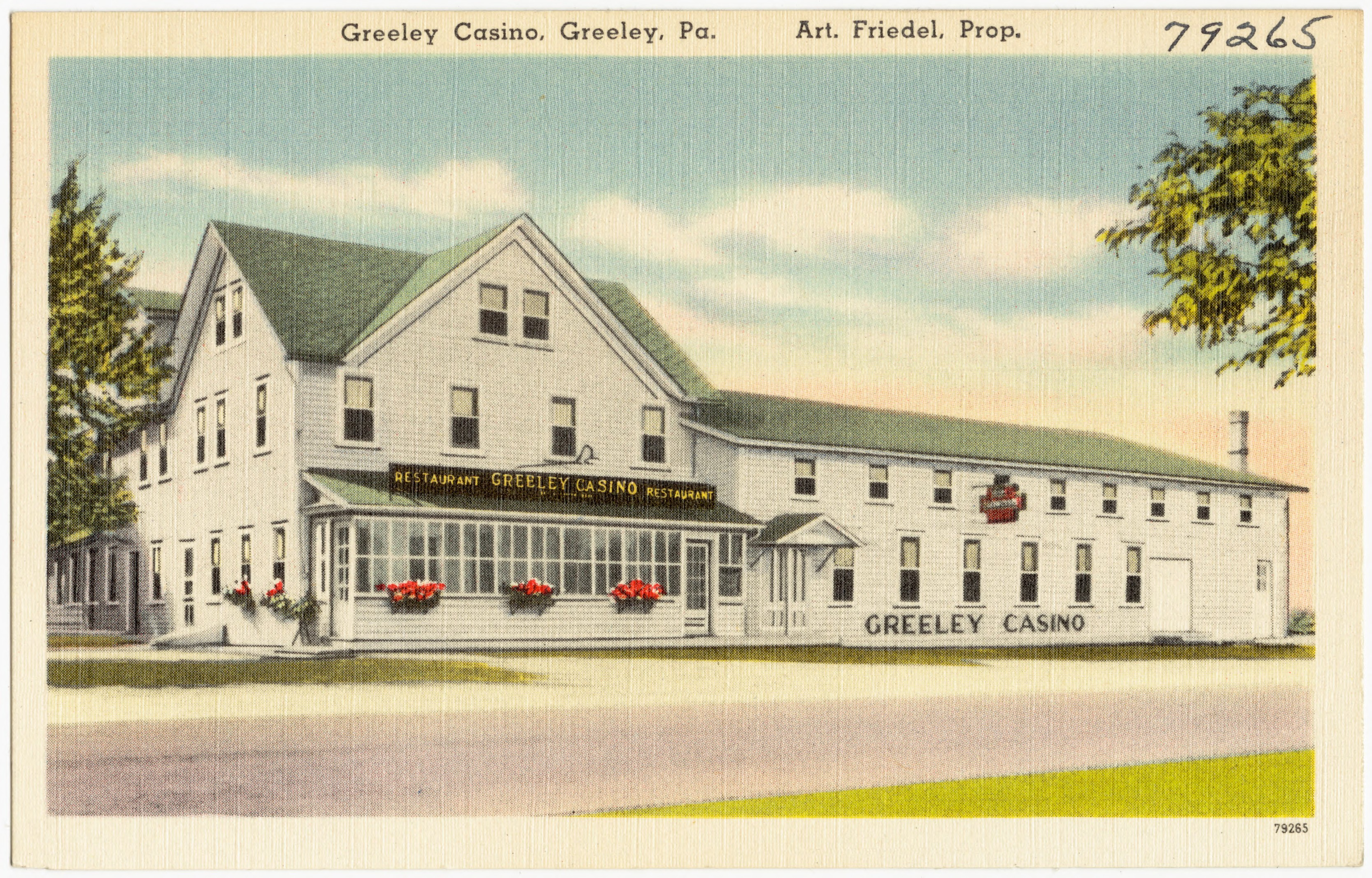
Early 20th century postcard of the Greeley Casino (now the Greeley Inn) in Greeley, Pennsylvania

Greeley is a town in Pike County, Pennsylvania, United States, approximately halfway between Milford and Hawley. Its population is 1322. Lake Greeley Camp is named after this town, and is situated on Lake Greeley.

Greeley is a rural, heavily wooded section of Pike County, with no central town square. It is mostly established summer camp grounds and state game lands. Camp Shohola, Pine Forest Camp, Lake Greeley Camp, Camp Timber Tops, and Lake Owego Camp are popular summer camps for children and teens throughout the tri-state area. Camp Lee Mar, a camp in Greeley for children and young adults with special needs, has been in operation for over 60 years.

The town is actually under the administrative control of the municipality of nearby Lackawaxen, Pennsylvania, which lies at the convergence of the Delaware and Lackawaxen rivers within the Upper Delaware Scenic and Recreational River. Prolific western author Zane Grey began his writing career in Lackawaxen, relating stories of his experiences along the Upper Delaware River.

== Namesake ==
Greeley is named for Horace Greeley (February 3, 1811 – November 29, 1872) founder of The New York Tribune, considered to be the US's most influential newspaper from the 1840s to the 1870s. Horace Greeley served a three-month term as a US Congressman, and was a founding member of the Liberal Republican Party. He was also the Liberal Republican Party candidate for the 1872 United States presidential election.

== Sylvania Association ==
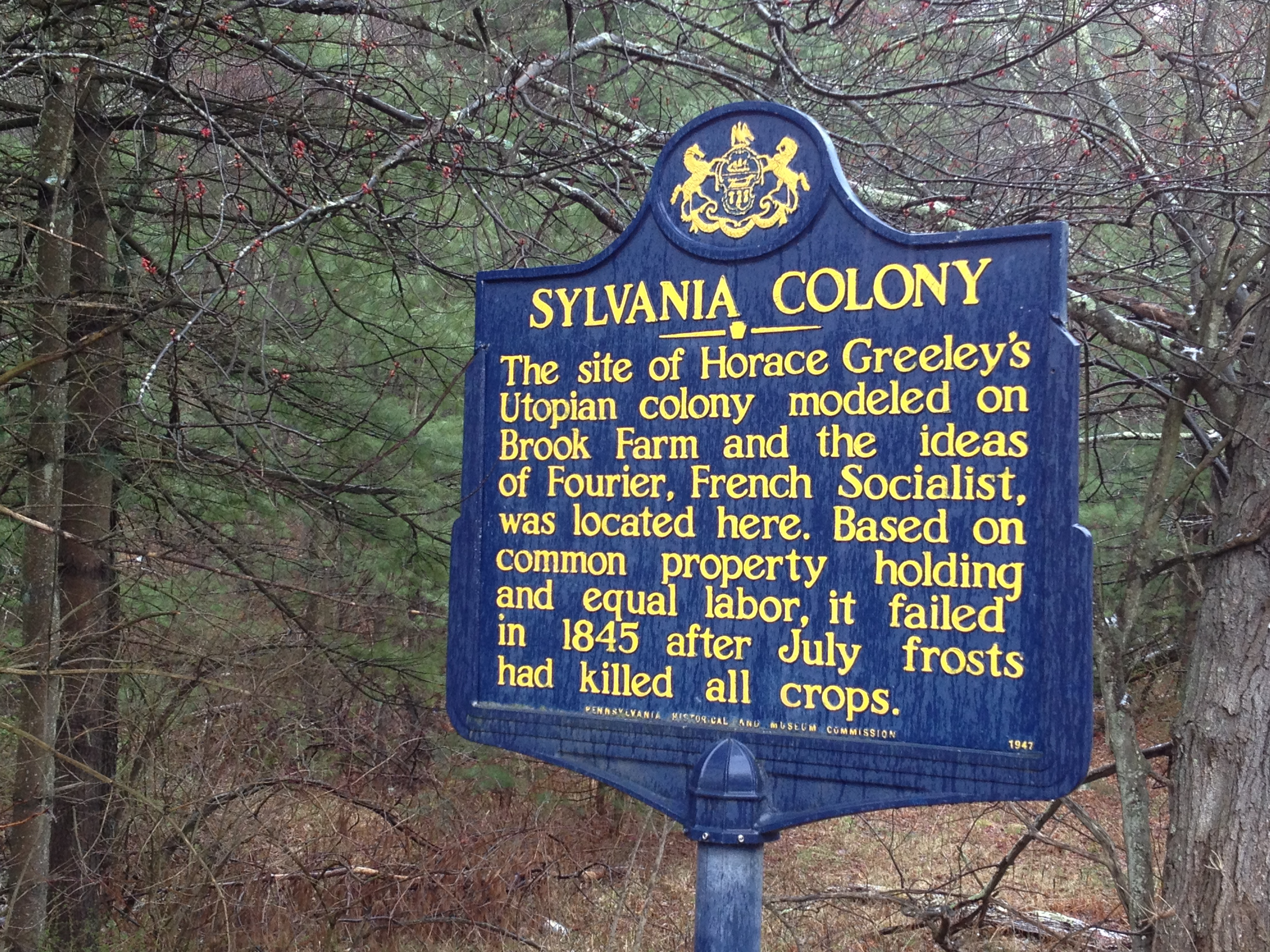
Sylvania Colony sign on Route 434

Horace Greeley had supported a rural commune known as the Sylvania Association, then located within the township's current boundaries. The commune, for which Horace Greeley served as Treasurer, had attempted to structure itself in accordance with the radical ideas of Albert Brisbane, who briefly studied Charles Fourier and Karl Marx.

The association purchased 3,200 acres (1,300 ha) from Mahlon Godley Sr. in 1842. It subsequently built a small saw mill, two small two-story houses, and a small barn. Only the foundation of the mill remains with some of the walls exceeding twenty feet in height. The old mill wall still stands alongside a stream that still flows through the township. It can still be seen near a historical state marker along what is now the junction of Routes 434 and 590. The association eventually failed, in 1845, because the members, unaccustomed to wilderness, failed to plant and harvest sufficient crops.

== Today ==
Although Greeley remains a mostly rural, mountainous location between the somewhat more cosmopolitan towns of Hawley and Milford, Greeley attracts second home owners drawn to its scenery and quiet lifestyle. Route 590, which runs through the town, is a popular route for motorcycle enthusiasts on their way from nearby Lake Wallenpaupack to the Delaware River, which lies approximately three miles down the road. U.S. Route 6 also runs through the Greeley.

On July 1, 2013, the Kahr Arms company announced that it was leaving New York state because of New York's Secure Ammunition and Firearms Enforcement Act (NY SAFE Act) of 2013. Kahr purchased 620 acres near Greeley in Blooming Grove Township, Pike County, Pennsylvania, and said it would move its corporate staff after building offices in 2014 with plans to build a new factory by 2019.
