= Santa Justa =

Santa Justa may refer to:

- Santa Justa Lift, lift in the city of Lisbon, Portugal
- Santa Justa (Lisbon), parish in Lisbon, Portugal
- Santa Justa, parish in Arraiolos, Portugal
- Santa Justa Klan, Spanish music band
- Seville–Santa Justa railway station, railway station in Seville
- Saints Justa and Rufina (Spanish: Santa Justa y Santa Rufina)
