= Giustino Episcopio =

Italian painter

Giusto or Giustino Episcopio known as il Salvolini, (active 1594) was an Italian painter of history and sacred subjects, active in Rome and Urbania. He was born in Castel Durante, now called Urbania in the region of the Marche, and left many paintings in the churches there.
