= Justin Lawrence =

Justin Lawrence may refer to:

- Justin Lawrence (fighter) (born 1990), American professional mixed martial artist
- Justin Lawrence (baseball) (born 1994), American professional baseball pitcher
- Justin Lawrence (Canadian football) (born 1996), Canadian professional offensive lineman
