= Justin Jackson =

Justin Jackson may refer to:

- Justin Jackson (American football) (born 1996), American football player
- Justin Jackson (basketball, born 1990), American basketball player who went to college at Cincinnati
- Justin Jackson (basketball, born 1995), American basketball player in the NBA who went to college at North Carolina
- Justin Jackson (basketball, born 1997), Canadian basketball player who went to college at Maryland
- Justin Jackson (footballer) (born 1974), English footballer
