= Justin Jones =

Justin Jones may refer to:

- Justin Jones (Tennessee politician), American politician from Tennessee
- Justin Jones (Nevada politician) (born 1974), American politician from Nevada
- Justin Jones (American football), American defensive tackle
- Justin Jones (guitarist) (born 1964), English guitarist
- Justin Jones (singer-songwriter) (born 1979), American singer-songwriter
- Justin Jones (admiral), RAN
- Justin Roderick Jones, of the duo Cas and Jonesy, Australian explorer, endurance athlete and motivational speaker
