= Justin Armsden =

Australian broadcast journalist

Justin Armsden is an Australian television news journalist, reporter and presenter. Armsden was the host of CNN International's Living Golf and an anchor of the network's daily sports program, World Sport, and later worked as an investigative reporter for Channel Nine's A Current Affair.

== Early life ==
Armsden grew up in Victoria, the son of newspaper journalist, Alan Armsden, the Managing Editor of the Herald Sun in Melbourne.

== Career ==
Armsden moved to Queensland in 1989 and began his career in 1990 as a cadet newspaper journalist at Brisbane's Sun newspaper.

Between 1992 and 1995, Armsden was a police and court reporter at the Gold Coast's The Bulletin magazine. During this time, Armsden won two Quill Awards in the categories of Best News Story (Print) and the Golden Quill Journalist of the Year.

Armsden moved into television news reporting in 1996, joining Channel Nine's Gold Coast News service as crime correspondent. In 1999, Armsden moved to London and took up a position at Sky News Online. In 2000 he began work at CNN International, covering international sporting events and interviewing sports celebrities. He covered the 2002 FIFA World Cup (soccer) in Japan for CNN. He reported from Jamaica as the suspected murder of cricket's Bob Woolmer unfolded, and covered the inaugural Abu Dhabi Grand Prix, Wimbledon Championships, The Ashes cricket series, UEFA Champions League finals, Tour de France, Six Nations final in Wales (2009), golf's The Open Championship, Dubai World Championship, Dubai Desert Classic, Ryder Cup, Alfred Dunhill Links Championship. Armsden also hosted CNN International's coverage of the Masters at Augusta, for the return of Tiger Woods to professional golf in 2010.

Armsden returned to Australia in October 2010, where he took up a post as an anchor for Fox Sport News. After six months with the network he moved to Channel Nine's A Current Affair. He created national headlines in 2012 after uncovering information about controversial MP Craig Thomson. Armsden interviewed a former prostitute who claimed to be one of Thomson's clients but she later retracted her statement, despite signing a statutory declaration.

In 2014 he uncovered the hiding place of con man Peter Foster, and reported on his arrest.

== Personal ==
Armsden ran and finished the London Marathon in 2000.
