= Justin Phillips =

Justin Phillips may refer to:

- Justin Phillips (American football) (born 1995), American football player
- Justin Phillips (Canadian football) (born 1985), Canadian football player
- Justin Phillips (rugby union) (born 1995), South African rugby union player
