= Justin Williams (disambiguation) =

Justin Williams (born 1981) is an ice hockey player.

Justin Williams may also refer to:

- Justin Williams (American football) (born 2006), American football player
- Justin Williams (baseball) (born 1995), American baseball player
- Justin Williams (basketball) (born 1984), American basketball player
- Justin Williams (cyclist) (born 1989), American professional cyclist
