= Justin Goldberg =

American music executive (born 1966)

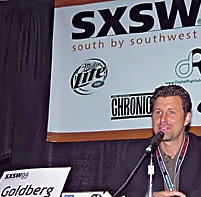

Background information
- Born: Justin Goldberg; April 12, 1966 (age 60)
- Origin: New York, NY
- Genres: Pop, alternative rock
- Occupations: Artist manager, Music executive, author, film producer, music producer
- Years active: 1991–present

Justin Goldberg (born April 12, 1966) is an American music and film industry executive and artist manager. Goldberg has held senior executive positions at such companies as Sony Music, Red Light Management, and Razor & Tie Entertainment. He has worked extensively in music, television and film as a producer, writer and music supervisor, collaborating on projects including Disney's animated features Tangled, Prep & Landing: Naughty vs. Nice, the Forest Whitaker narrated film Before the Music Dies, Touchstone/ABC's Veritas: The Quest, In Memory of My Father, and various music video productions at events such as Bonnaroo and Coachella. He is the author of The Ultimate Survival Guide to the New Music Industry: Handbook for Hell (Crown Publishing Group / Random House). An outspoken critic of the music industry's traditional business model, he is an early advocate for online marketing and distribution. He is the founder of Measurement Arts, which has managed a broad range of projects and artists focused on the music industry. Goldberg has been a featured speaker at the prestigious Milken Institute Global Conference, SXSW, Midem and other major industry conventions.

Goldberg is credited with the development and discovery of several prominent artists in the music industry, including Martin Sexton and Grace Potter.

He has been active in music education. In March 1997, Goldberg was appointed adjunct professor at CUNY/Baruch College, where he taught entertainment marketing. He lectured at The Musician's Institute, USC, The Dickensen School of Law, and at various industry conventions including ASCAP, SXSW, NARM, National Association for Music Education (NAfME) and the Milken Institute, where he debated with Quincy Jones and then Sony Music CEO Andrew Lack on the subject of recorded music industry revenues.

One of digital distribution's early pioneers, Goldberg founded the Online Music Channel in 1998, and held key posts at major online music companies such as iMesh, Tonos, and Riffage.com. An accomplished graphic artist, Goldberg has had several gallery showings, including a benefit for the City of Hope at the Patricia Correia Gallery in Santa Monica in 2001. As a music executive and manager, he has worked with a wide range of artists and producers, including Mos Def, Dee Dee Ramone, David Foster, Dave Grohl, Martin Sexton, T Bone Burnett, Mark Batson, Willie Nelson, Warren Haynes, Kenny Chesney, Peter Buck, Mick Taylor, Barrett Jones, Wally Gagel and Rage Against the Machine.

== Biography ==
=== Early life and career ===
Goldberg initially geared his career towards becoming an actor, training in New York City at Herbert Berghoff studios, then later in Los Angeles with Charles Conrad at CEC studios. He graduated from USC with a Bachelor of Arts in theatre. His career as a music executive in A&R began at Sony Music International and later with Sony/ATV Music Publishing in 1991 as an A&R assistant. Goldberg's father, New York City based attorney Jay Goldberg, introduced him to clients in his youth such as Miles Davis, Willie Nelson and Waylon Jennings, who encouraged his interest in the music industry and helped produce his demo tapes. After a successful case involving Mick Jagger, his college fund was established by a check from the Rolling Stones. After losing a personal bet with Donald Trump related to his independent record label, Goldberg agreed to work for The Trump Organization in real estate for one year, beginning in 1998.

=== Sony Music Publishing ===
From 1991 to 1996, Goldberg served as Director of Artists & Repertoire for Sony/ATV Music Publishing in Santa Monica, CA where he built the company's publishing profile by signing early publishing deals with such artists as Martin Sexton, Rage Against the Machine, Candlebox Chixdiggit, Menthol, Gus Black, and projects related to Pearl Jam's guitarist Stone Gossard’s Loose Groove label, founded by Regan Hagar, including Brad, Satchel, Pigeonhed and Devilhead, featuring Kevin Wood, brother of the late Andrew Wood a founder of Pearl Jam.

=== Tonos Entertainment ===
From January 2000 to March 2001, Goldberg was the Sr. Vice President of Content at Tonos Entertainment, a large scale online music company based in Culver City and founded by producers David Foster, Kenny "Babyface" Edmonds and songwriter Carole Bayer Sager. Goldberg led a development team to help devise and produce the first online music collaboration community during a period where most online users still dialed through landlines for internet access.

=== Laundry Room Records, Inc. ===
Laundry Room Records was founded in September 2006 by Goldberg and Seattle based producer Barrett Jones, whose credits include producing Nirvana and Foo Fighters at the Laundry Room Studio, founded by Jones in 1990. The record company was run by Goldberg in New York City while most of the company's releases were recorded or mixed at the company's recording studio on Greenwood Avenue in Seattle. The company released full length albums by Tube Top (produced by R.E.M.'s Peter Buck), Harlingtox, Angel Divine (featuring Dave Grohl), Churn (featuring Barrett Jones), Walkie Talkie (with collaborations by Mick Taylor) Sharon America, For Stars and Xing, and seven inch singles from The Chauffeur. The company was distributed initially by the Northwest Alliance of Independent Labels (NAIL) and later by Never Records Group and Proper Sales & Distribution, a successful distribution and label services pairing that were an early model for other independent distribution coalitions, and outlined sharing for labels and artists.

=== Indie911.com ===
Launched in March 2003, Goldberg was the founder, CEO and lead architect of indie911 networks, which provided one of the earliest social networking websites focused on selling new music online. Circulating podcasts of original radio programming and a daily “hoooka of the day” to over 100,000 subscribers for a three-year period, Goldberg helmed an artist discovery platform spotlighting dozens before they were signed by record deals and known to the public, including Shiny Toy Guns and The Submarines. The company maintained distribution and marketing agreements with entertainment companies such as Disney, CBS, Reveille/NBC, American Express, Ingrooves, The European Music Office, The Canadian Independent Record Production Association (CIRPA), V2, Associated Production Music (APM), IODA, Yangaroo, Live Universe/Live Video, Songcatalog, Mediaguide, MECA, and ASCAP.

==== indie911 Myspace Controversy ====
In December 2006, indie911 launched “Hoooka”, the first online sales widget and player providing personalized streaming of audio and video playlists from consumers and artists offering distributed retail as an online transaction. Under the Hoooka brand, indie911 marketed content from developing artists on a daily basis by publishing exclusive content to its online subscribers under the title "Hoooka of the Day."

A New York Times article covering the controversy helped lead to a national discussion on the public's expectations for social networking sites.

indie911 launched the "Small Screen Film Festival" the first online film festival focusing exclusively on content created for cell phones. By 2005, the website contained over 200,000 pages of web content and was one of the largest streaming music websites with over 1,000,000 copyrights licensed for online streaming and digital sales.

=== Television and film ===
Goldberg was featured as a music industry commentator in the film Before the Music Dies, featuring Erykah Badu, Eric Clapton and Dave Matthews and narrated by Forest Whitaker. From 2003 through 2004, Goldberg served as music supervisor for the television show Veritas: The Quest, created by John Zinman and Patrick Masset by Touchstone Television and was the music supervisor for the film In Memory Of My Father. Goldberg appeared as an actor with Sean Penn and Robert Duvall in Dennis Hopper's film Colors (1987), playing the role of a police officer, and with Willie Nelson and Kris Kristofferson in the film Another Pair of Aces (1991) Aces where he played an FBI agent.

=== As author ===
Goldberg wrote the play "Testing Negative," produced at the McCadden Place Theatre in 1988. It ignited local controversy as the first US production to address the AIDS epidemic from a heterosexual point of view. In his review, Don Shirley of the Los Angeles Times said: "There is talent here: Writer Justin Goldberg [...] is tuned into the pitiless chatter of extended adolescence." Goldberg's book The Ultimate Survival Guide to the New Music Industry: Handbook for Hell was published in 2004 by Crown Publishing Group / Random House and continues to serve as a leading resource for independent musicians seeking to distribute their music in the digital age.

=== As graphic artist ===
As a graphic artist Goldberg dubbed his work "A&Rt", a reference to those in and around the business of acquiring new talent in the music industry, known as "Artists and Repertoire," or A&R. Utilizing a process that typically begins with digitally manipulated photographs transferred to cotton canvass, he creates a mood of depth and antiquity by then applying water-soluble crayons and acrylic paint. The work is both an homage to and an indictment of its primary subject matter, the music business and those who work in it. Musical luminaries common to most followers of pop music culture appear throughout the work including Dave Grohl, Courtney Love, Jewel, Dave Matthews Band, P Diddy, Cake and Incubus, as well as music industry figures such as Guy Oseary, Tommy Mottola and Fred Davis.

== Quotes ==
“Why shouldn’t they call it FoxSpace? Or RupertSpace?” – Goldberg to New York Times reporter Brad Stone

“Pretty soon both of you will be out of business (well maybe not you Quincy)" – Goldberg to Quincy Jones and then Sony Music CEO Andrew Lack

== Discography ==
- Sharon America, Sharon America, Producer (1996)
- Walkie Talkie, School Yard Ryhmes, Producer (1996)
- Harlingtox, Angel Divine, Executive Producer (1996)
