= Justin Thomas (disambiguation) =

Justin Thomas (born 1993) is an American professional golfer.

Justin Thomas may also refer to:

- Justin Thomas (rugby union) (born 1973), Welsh rugby player
- Justin Thomas (baseball) (born 1984), American baseball player
- Justin Thomas (American football) (born 1994), American football player

== See also ==
- JT Daly (Justin Thomas Daly, born 1981), American musician, producer, songwriter and visual artist
