= Justinas Usonis =

Justinas Usonis (born 1975) is Attorney at law, PhD, and Associate Professor at Private Law dept. in Vilnius University Faculty of Law. He was also a member of the group responsible for drafting a new Lithuanian Labour Code (2015).

== Biography ==
In 1998, he graduated at Vilnius University Law faculty. In 2006, he gained a PhD in social sciences, law. He lectures on Labour law.

Since 2004, he has been an attorney at law. From 1998 to 2004, he worked as a lawyer at Lithuanian Road Carriers Association „Linava“. From 2006 to 2012, he served as the head of Labour Law and Social Security dept. at Mykolas Romeris University Faculty of Law, and also as an associate Professor. From 2014, he has been a member of Court of honour at Lithuanian Bar Association. He is also a member of the Lithuanian Society of Labour law and social security. He is the author of several scientific publications and reads presentations on Labour law.
From 2009, he has served as the head of Employment relationship committee at Confederation of Lithianian Industrialists (LPK). From 2014, he has been an Assoc. Prof. at Private Law dept. in Vilnius University Faculty of Law.
In 2015, he participated in group of researchers for drafting a new Labour code of Republic of Lithuania.
He speaks Lithuanian, English and Russian languages.
