= Gun laws in Massachusetts =

Location of Massachusetts in the United States

Gun laws in Massachusetts regulate the sale, possession, and use of firearms and ammunition in the Commonwealth of Massachusetts in the United States. These laws are among the most restrictive in the entire country.

On July 25, 2024, Maura Healey, the Governor of Massachusetts, signed An Act Modernizing Firearms Laws (H.4885) described as "the state's most significant gun safety legislation in a decade." Changes per H.4885 were due to go into effect 90 days from the date of signing, on October 23, 2024. However, the governor signed an emergency measure on October 2, 2024, which put the Act into effect on that date. Efforts to suspend the Act for two years, via a citizens' initiative, were ongoing at that time. Some aspects of the Act, such as requiring live-fire training for prospective gun owners, have been delayed by action of the state legislature.

== Summary table ==
Note: this section does not yet reflect changes per An Act Modernizing Firearms Laws (H.4885).

Subject / law	Long guns	Handguns	Relevant statutes	Notes
State permit required to purchase?	Yes	Yes	MA Ch. 140 Sec. 129C, Sec. 131 3/4	Firearms Identification Card (FID) or License to Carry Firearms (LTC) required, which are normally issued by local police departments. The state's Firearms Records Bureau handles applications for non-resident licenses to carry, and resident alien permits. Historically, some issuing authorities (notably the Boston Police Department) required an applicant to justify the need for a firearm—see additional discussion below regarding "shall issue". Federal Firearms License (FFL) holders may only sell handguns that appear on one of the state's "approved firearms rosters", although this does not prohibit LTC holders from lawfully possessing handguns not on the rosters.
Firearm registration?	No	No	MA Ch. 140 Sec. 128A	Although registration is not specifically required by law, transfers of firearm ownership are required to be recorded with the Massachusetts Executive Office of Public Safety and Security (EOPSS): by the seller if in state, or by the buyer if out of state. The Massachusetts EOPSS also provides the option to register a firearm, although, other than obtaining a firearm from out of state (a transfer of ownership), this is not required by law.
Owner license required?	Yes	Yes	MA Ch. 140 Sec. 129C	Firearms Identification Card (FID) or License to Carry Firearms (LTC) required.
License required for concealed carry?	Yes	Yes	MA Ch. 140 Sec. 131	License to Carry Firearms (LTC) required. Massachusetts is a de facto "shall issue" state for carry since the Supreme Court's decision in New York State Rifle & Pistol Association, Inc. v. Bruen held "may issue" regimes unconstitutional. The issuing authority must provide written explanation for the denial of any application, which is subject to appeal. The issuing authority is the local police chief for most jurisdictions, who issues carry licenses based on an applicant's suitability and compliance with background check and training requirements. Permits are valid statewide, provided the license-holder complies with restrictions (if any) imposed by the issuing authority.
License required for open carry?	Yes	Yes		License to Carry Firearms (LTC) required. Note than an individual who can lawfully carry firearms does not have to conceal a firearm in public. Moreover, in 2013, the Massachusetts Supreme Judicial Court ruled (FRB v. Simkin) that such a person is not responsible for alarm caused by licensed carry of a handgun, and that a permit cannot be revoked for suitability purposes under these circumstances. If police demand to see the permit, it must be produced, per G.L. c. 140, § 129C. Failure to produce a LTC upon demand by law enforcement is probable cause for arrest. *G.L. c. 140, § 129C has been removed as of October, 2024.
State preemption of local restrictions?	No	No		There is limited preemption for some laws.
Assault weapon law?	Yes	Yes	MA Ch. 140 Sec. 121	Massachusetts statute lists specific firearms that are deemed assault weapons, and also incorporates the definition of an assault weapon per "18 U.S.C. section 921(a)(30) as appearing in such section on September 13, 1994", which is a two-point "banned features" system. Firearms listed as assault weapons or failing the two-point system are prohibited, unless lawfully owned on or prior to September 13, 1994. Firearms that do not meet the definition of an assault weapon are legal to purchase with an LTC, or in some cases an FID, as long as applicable magazine capacity restrictions are followed.
Magazine capacity restriction?	Yes	Yes	MA Ch. 140 Sec. 121	Unlawful to possess magazines of over 10 rounds capacity. "Pre-ban" magazines (manufactured before September 13, 1994) are exempt from this restriction.
NFA weapons restricted?	Yes	Yes	MA Ch. 140 Sec. 131	Suppressors are restricted only for law enforcement or licensed manufacturers. Some destructive devices (DD) are banned at the state level, while others are banned at a local level; they can be completely illegal or legal, depending on what town one lives in. Short-barreled rifles (SBR), short barrel shotguns (SBS), and any other weapon (AOW) are allowed with proper approval from the Bureau of Alcohol, Tobacco, Firearms and Explosives (ATF). To lawfully possess a machine gun, a machine gun license is required.
Background checks required for private sales?	Yes	Yes	MA Ch. 140 Sec. 128A	The seller must verify the buyer's FID or LTC with the state's Department of Criminal Justice Information Services (CJIS), which is "conducted over a real time web portal" developed by CJIS.
Red flag law?	Yes	Yes	MA Ch. 140 Sec. 131R	A judge may issue an extreme risk protection order (ERPO) to temporarily confiscate the firearms of a person who appears to be at risk of harming themselves or another person.

== Regulations and processes ==
Note: this section does not yet reflect changes per An Act Modernizing Firearms Laws (H.4885).

=== Licensing process ===
Massachusetts law requires firearm owners to be licensed through their local police department, or the Massachusetts State Police if no local licensing authority is available. A license is required by state law for buying firearms and ammunition. An applicant must have passed a state-approved firearm safety course before applying for a license.

All applications, interviews, fees, and fingerprinting are done at the local police department then sent electronically to the Massachusetts Criminal History Board for the mandatory background checks and processing. All approved applicants will receive their license from the issuing police department. All licensing information is stored by the Criminal History Board. Non-residents who are planning on carrying in the state must apply for a temporary license to carry (LTC) through the Massachusetts State Police before their travel.

==== Non-citizen permits ====
Non-citizens who reside in Massachusetts can apply for a "permit to possess non-large-capacity rifles and shotguns pursuant M.G.L. 140 s. 131H" directly with the state's Firearms Records Bureau (FRB). The applicants must receive firearms education at the FID or LTC-level and pass a 20-fingerprint FBI background check and interview. This permit is a "may issue" document similar to the FID but expiring December 31 of each year. The procedure requires about 16 weeks from application to delivery of the permit. There is no 90-day grace period for the renewal of non-citizens permits.

Both nonresident (i.e. visa holders) and permanent resident (i.e. "green card" holders) non-citizens are lumped together by Massachusetts law. The non-citizens permit allows the possession of non-high capacity (10 rounds or less) shotguns, rifles, and ammunition. This includes .22 caliber rifles with tubular magazines holding more than 10 rounds, but it excludes high capacity rifles, assault rifles, and handguns. FID and LTC are generally not issued to non-citizens even though Massachusetts law grants some latitude to the Colonel of Massachusetts State Police, who may be petitioned directly.

A 2012 lawsuit, Fletcher v. Haas, expanded Massachusetts non-citizens' gun rights by allowing possession and purchase of handguns for permanent resident non-citizens (green card holders). non-citizens permits are still in existence and required for all non-permanent resident non-citizens in Massachusetts. As of April 30, 2012, all lawful permanent resident non-citizens (green card holders) are eligible to apply for a Massachusetts resident license to carry ("LTC") or firearms identification card ("FID").

=== Types of firearm licenses ===
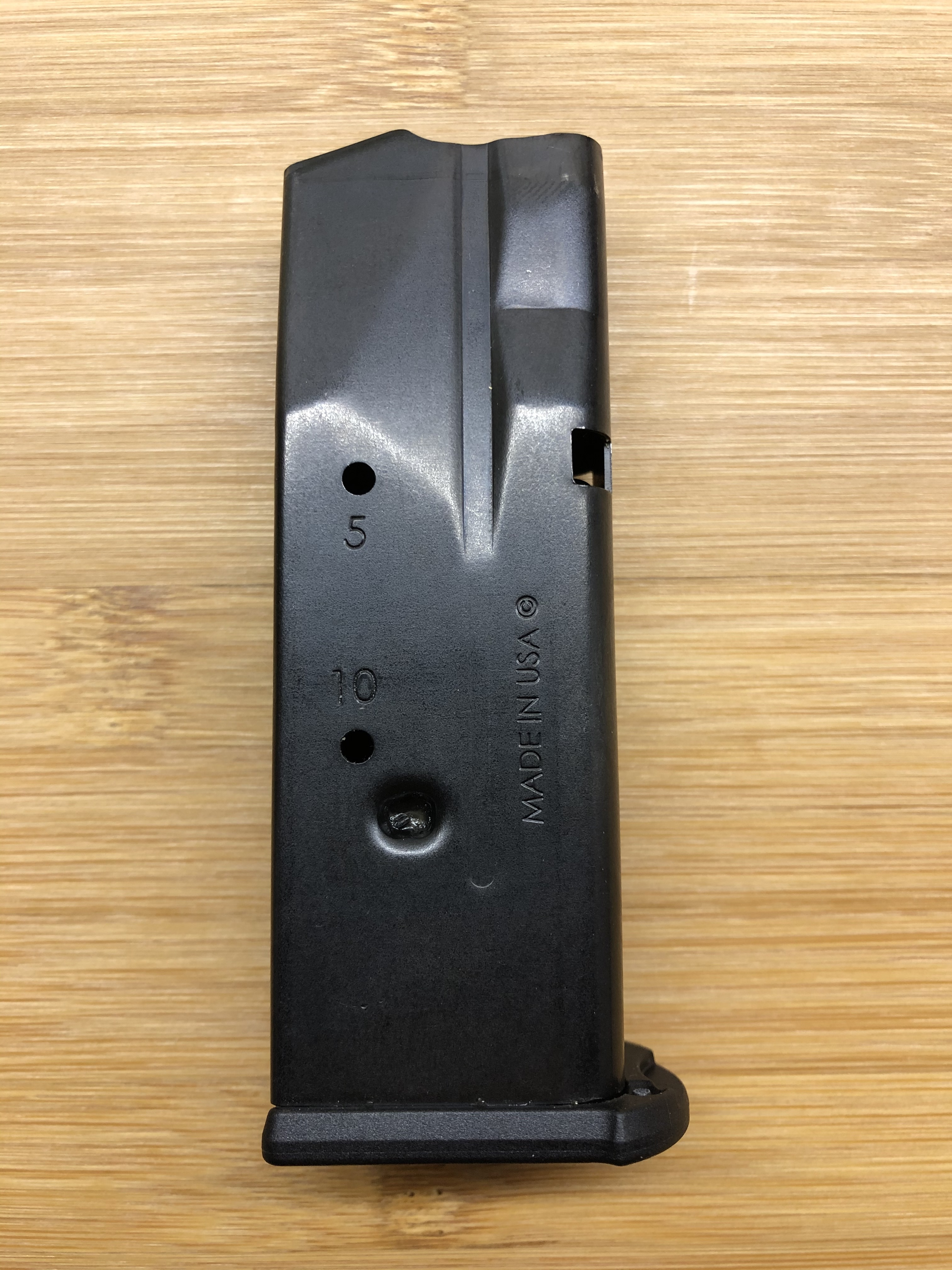
A magazine for a SIG Sauer P365 XL, modified by the manufacturer to limit capacity to 10 rounds, rather than its full 12 rounds. Capacity is limited by the crimp seen slightly below the 10-round witness hole, for compliance with the magazine capacity limits in place within Massachusetts.

Massachusetts issues the following types of firearms licenses:

- FID (Firearms Identification Card): Permits the purchase of rifles and shotguns with a capacity of no more than 10 rounds and their carrying for hunting and sporting purposes. FIDs are "shall issue", except if the applicant fails a background check or is deemed "unsuitable" by the chief of police or issuing authority.
- LTC (License to Carry): An LTC is required to carry a pistol (openly or concealed) in Massachusetts. Also, an LTC allows the holder to purchase any firearm legal in the Commonwealth of Massachusetts, including "large capacity" firearms, which are those potentially holding greater than 10 rounds. Magazines holding more than 10 rounds are unlawful in Massachusetts, with the exception of law enforcement or "pre-ban" (Note: "Pre-ban" refers to the Federal Assault Weapons Ban, which took effect on September 13, 1994, and was in place (at a federal level) for 10 years.) magazines (those manufactured prior to September 13, 1994). Note: as of January 1, 2015, Massachusetts no longer issues different classes of License to Carry (LTC). Previously, LTCs were issued as Class A or Class B. Class B (LTC-B) precluded the person it was issued to from buying or possessing any handgun considered "large capacity". There is now only a single LTC, which is identical to the old Class A (LTC-A).
- "Machine gun" license: A machine gun license, granted on a may-issue basis, is required to purchase/possess a machine gun. Issuance is at the discretion of the police chief of the city or town, and criteria vary widely. Machine gun licenses are generally only issued to collectors—Curio and Relic (C&R) Federal Firearms License (FFL) holders—and police instructors.

Additionally, LTC permits may have the following restrictions, however, none of these restrictions have been clearly defined by state law, and are subject to each chief of police's definition of such. Violation of the restrictions imposed by the licensing authority shall be cause for suspension or revocation of the license and a fine of $1,000 to $10,000.

- Employment: restricts possession to business owner engaged in business activities or to an employee while engaged in work-related activities, and maintaining proficiency, where the employer requires the carry of a firearm (i.e. armored car, security guard, etc.). Includes travel to and from activity location.
- Target and hunting: (most common restriction): restricts possession to the purpose of lawful recreational shooting or competition; for use in the lawful pursuit of game animals and birds; for personal protection in the home; and for the purpose of collecting (other than machine guns). Includes travel to and from activity location.
- Sporting: restricts possession to the purpose of lawful recreational shooting or competition; for use in the lawful pursuit of game animals and birds; for personal protection in the home; for the purpose of collecting (other than machine guns); and for outdoor recreational activities such as hiking, camping, cross-country skiing, or similar activities. Includes travel to and from activity location.
- Other (very rare): issuing police chief has special reason or direction for the restriction of the permit. Can vary greatly.

==== Machine gun licenses ====
A license to possess or carry a machine gun may be issued only to a firearm instructor certified by the Criminal Justice Training Council for the sole purpose of firearm instruction to police personnel, or to a bona fide collector of firearms upon application or renewal of such license.

A "bona fide collector of firearms", for the purpose of issuance of a machine gun license, shall be defined as an individual who acquires firearms for such lawful purposes as historical significance, display, research, lecturing, demonstration, test firing, investment or other like purpose. State regulations provide a presumption that holders of federal curios and relics collector licenses (FFL03) meet this definition.

For the purpose of issuance of a machine gun license, the acquisition of firearms for sporting use or for use as an offensive or defensive weapon shall not qualify an applicant as a bona fide collector of firearms.

=== Prohibited or restricted firearms ===
Massachusetts restricts the sale of handguns not appearing on an "approved firearms roster" issued periodically, and prohibits the sale or possession of certain firearms deemed to be "assault weapons".

==== Approved firearms roster ====
Massachusetts gun dealers may only sell handguns that appear on a state-approved firearms roster, although this does not prohibit LTC holders from lawfully possessing other handguns. As of June 2024, the Massachusetts Executive Office of Public Safety and Security (EOPSS) has published several rosters, which are updated periodically:

- Olympic Competition Firearms Roster
- Large Capacity Firearms Roster
- Formal Target Shooting Roster
- Approved Firearms Roster

Roster additions, which must pass state-define testing by one of several state-approved independent laboratories, are periodically recommended by the Gun Control Advisory Board (GCAB).

==== Assault weapons ====
Assault weapons are defined (with no exceptions, except pre-1994 models) as: (i) Avtomat Kalashnikov (AK) (all models); Action Arms Israeli Military Industries Uzi and Galil; Beretta Ar70 (SC-70); Colt AR-15; Fabrique National FN/FAL, FN/LAR and FNC; SWD M-10, M-11, M-11/9 and M-12; Steyr AUG; Intratec TEC-9, TEC-DC9, TEC-22; and revolving-cylinder shotguns including the Street Sweeper and the Striker 12.

Massachusetts statute specifically references "18 U.S.C. section 921(a)(30) as appearing in such section on September 13, 1994", which is a two-point "banned features" test. The effect is that assault weapons are also defined as:

1. A semiautomatic, centerfire rifle that has the capacity to accept a detachable magazine and any two of the following:
  - A pistol grip that protrudes conspicuously beneath the action of the weapon.
  - A folding or telescoping stock.
  - A grenade launcher or flare launcher.
  - A flash suppressor or threaded barrel designed to accommodate a flash suppressor.
  - A bayonet lug.
2. A semiautomatic pistol that has the capacity to accept a detachable magazine and any two of the following:
  - A threaded barrel, capable of accepting a flash suppressor.
  - A second handgrip.
  - A shroud that is attached to, or partially or completely encircles, the barrel that allows the bearer to fire the weapon without burning his or her hand, except a slide that encloses the barrel.
  - The capacity to accept a detachable magazine at some location outside of the pistol grip.
3. A semiautomatic shotgun that has two of the following:
  - A folding or telescoping stock.
  - A pistol grip that protrudes conspicuously beneath the action of the weapon.
  - A fixed-magazine capacity in excess of 5 rounds.
  - The ability to accept a detachable magazine.
4. Any shotgun with a revolving cylinder.

=== Firearm storage ===
Unless carried or under the control of the owner, state law requires all firearms to be stored in a locked container, or equipped with a tamper-resistant mechanical lock or other safety device (such as a trigger lock), properly engaged so as to render such firearm inoperable by any person other than the owner or other lawfully authorized user. If in a vehicle, firearm must be unloaded and contained within the locked trunk of such vehicle or in a locked case or other secure container, unless the licensee has an LTC, in which case the firearm may, alternately, be under the licensee's direct control. Any firearms that are found to be unsecured may be confiscated by law enforcement officers and license may be revoked. Violation is punishable "by a fine of not less than $2,000 nor more than $15,000 or by imprisonment for not less than 1 1/2 years nor more than 12 years or by both such fine and imprisonment."

In the event a license is revoked for any reason, law enforcement will confiscate all firearms and store them for one year before destroying or selling them unless the revoked licensee transfers ownership to a properly licensed party who then claims the firearms.

There is no penalty under the law for police authorities who fail to abide by the one-year provision of the statute, however, and many police departments have effectively nullified the one-year requirement in practice, effectively turning this holding period, during which the owner could transfer the firearms to someone else, into outright confiscation. This is accomplished by improperly selling the firearms to a dealer, or by placing the firearms into storage facilities that charge storage fees so high as to make retrieving the firearms prohibitive, then making no effort to inform the firearm owner of these fees. Within a short time, the firearms are then sold by the storage facility to pay costs, the police department receiving some money in return. Efforts to sue police departments for damages have been rejected by the courts there is no private right of action under Massachusetts General Laws ch. 140, § 129D (see Mirsky v. Barkas, 2011 WL 2371879, at *5-6 [Massachusetts Superior Court January 31, 2011]). The plaintiff in the above entitled action showed that the Quincy Police Department willfully violated the statute, after having brought civil action upon the restoration of his state license.

Also, gun license holders may encounter licensing issues when moving from one town to another. While one city or town police chief may have issued a license, the chief of police in the city or town where the license holder may move does not have to authorize it, and may require that guns be surrendered. If a gun license is not authorized, and the police determine that the resident also holds a license in a different state, they may contact law enforcement in that state and inform them of the action, which could lead to the loss of the out-of-state license as well.

=== Other laws ===
All Massachusetts residents who sell, transfer, inherit, or lose a firearm are required to report the sale, transfer, inheritance, or loss of the firearm to the Firearms Records Bureau (FRB) within the state's Department of Criminal Justice Information Services (CJIS) by filing an FA-10 form.

Massachusetts enacted a red flag law in 2018. A judge may issue an order to temporarily confiscate the firearms of a person who appears to be at risk of harming themselves or another person. A hearing must be held within 10 days of the order being issued. At the hearing, if there is sufficient evidence to substantiate the risk, the person's firearms may be confiscated for up to one year.

A license (such as an LTC or FID) is not required to possess "so-called black powder rifles, shotguns, and ammunition therefor", such as a muzzleloader.

While firearms laws in Massachusetts are some of the most restrictive in the United States, travelers with firearms passing through the state are afforded certain protections per the "safe passage" provision of the Firearm Owners Protection Act (FOPA).

With regards to concealed carry reciprocity, Massachusetts does not recognize any other state's firearms licensing.

== See also ==
- Law of Massachusetts
