= Justas =

Justas is a Lithuanian masculine given name. Notable people with the name include:

- Justas Paleckis (1899–1980), Lithuanian journalist and politician
- Justas Vincas Paleckis (born 1942), Lithuanian ex-communist and politician, diplomat
- Justas Sinica (born 1985), Lithuanian basketball player
- Justas Tamulis (born 1994), Lithuanian basketball player

== See also ==
- Las Justas, an intercollegiate sports event held yearly in Puerto Rico
- Justa (disambiguation)
