= Feed ramp =

Firearm feature which guides a cartridge from the magazine to the chamber

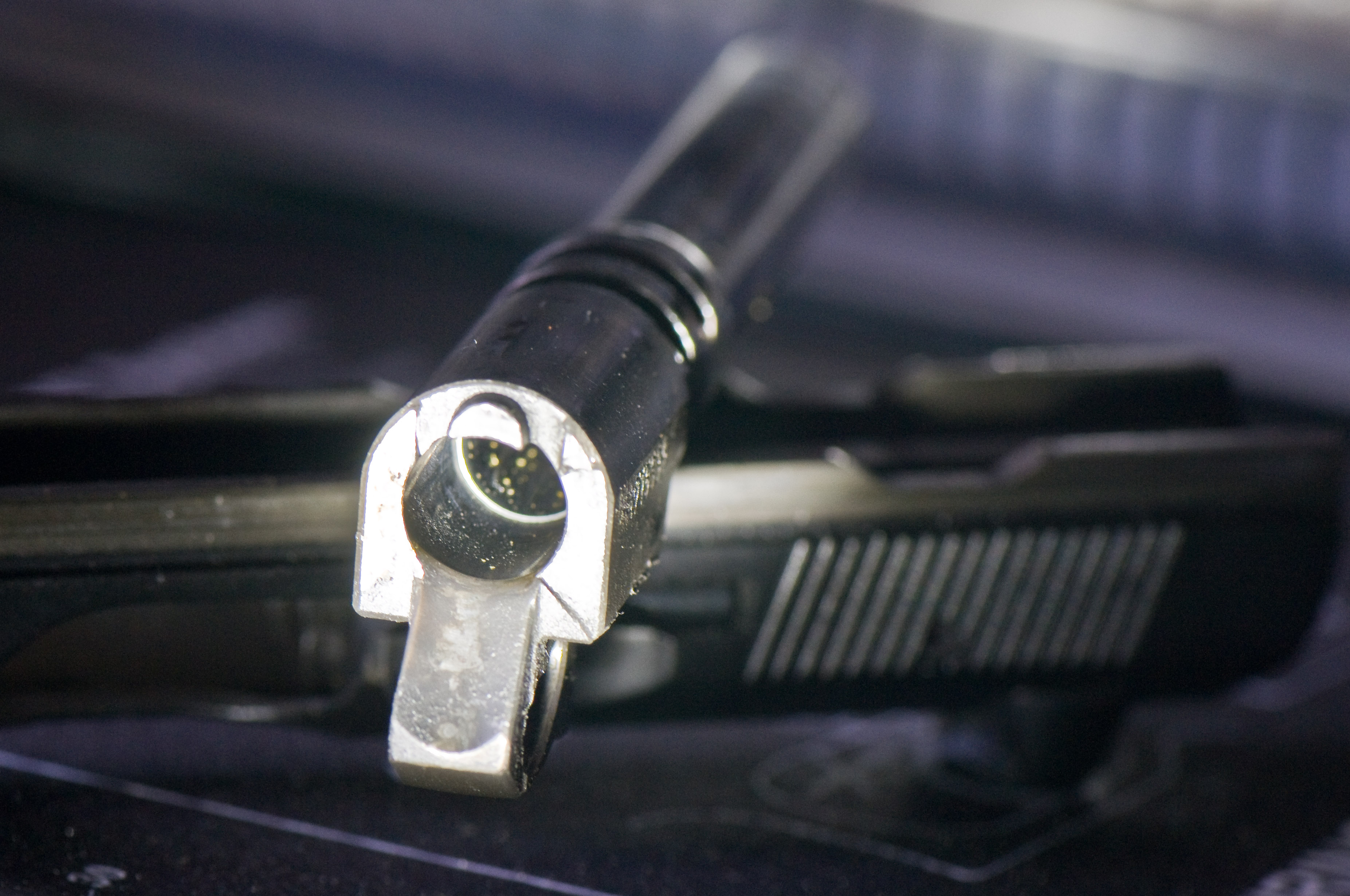
Rear side of a CZ-75B pistol barrel showing the (here dirty) feed ramp.

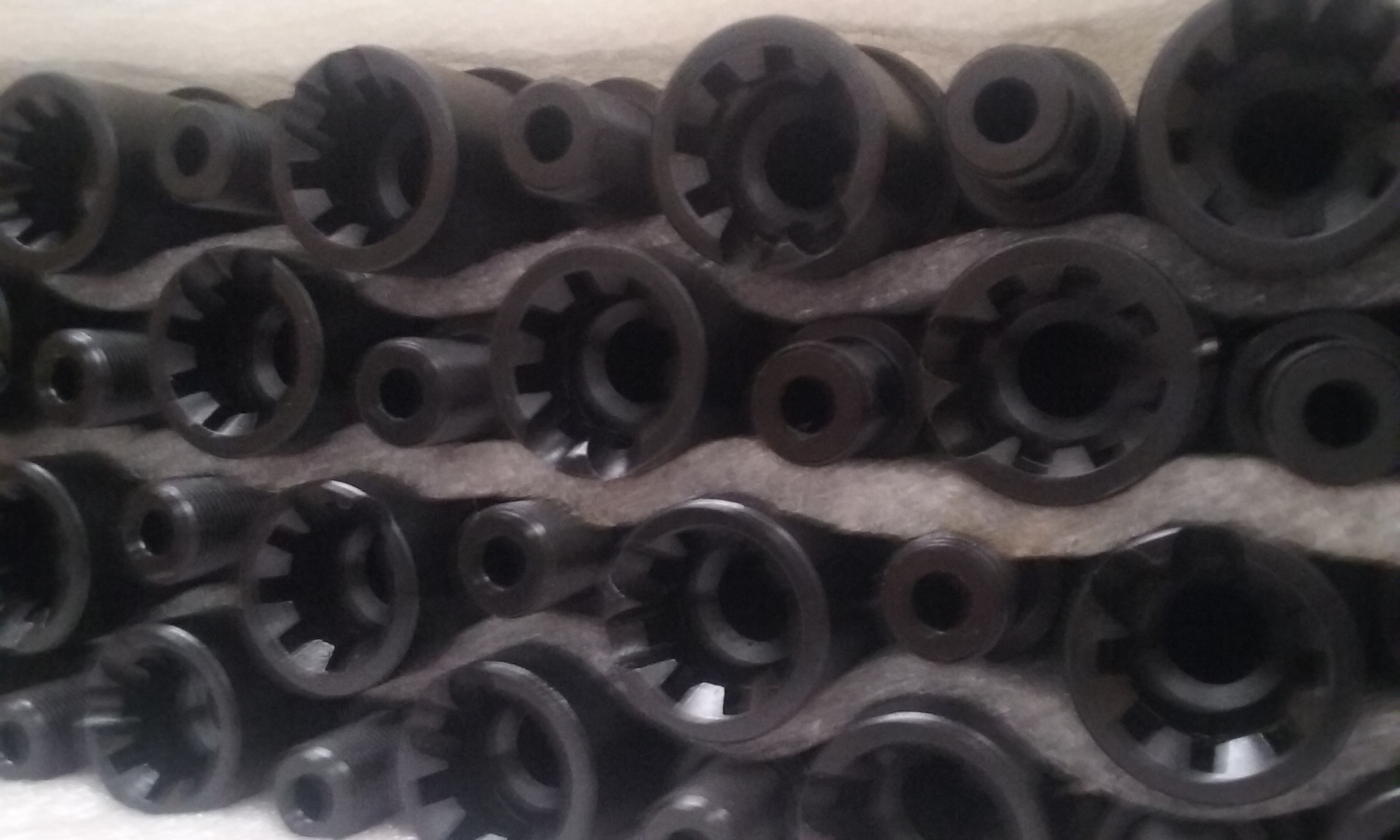
Locking lug feed ramp on AR-15 barrel nut.

A feed ramp is a basic feature of many breech loading cartridge firearm designs. It is a tightly machined and polished piece of metal which guides a cartridge from the top of the magazine into the firing chamber of the barrel. The feed ramp may be part of the magazine (AR-7), part of the receiver or frame (Mauser C96), part of the barrel (H&K USP) or part of the barrel nut/locking lugs (AR-15). Some firearms, like the FN Five-seven, have a beveled chamber instead of a feed ramp.

The feed ramp is a critical part of semi-automatic firearms and automatic firearms. When the weapon is fired and the spent case is ejected, the feed ramp functions to direct a fresh cartridge from the magazine into firing position; that is, the fresh cartridge slides along the feed ramp into battery. The need for the cartridge to slide both forwards and upwards along the feed ramp and into the barrel is the primary design consideration that makes the ogive the preferred shape for all modern automatic pistol rounds (a hollow point bullet is a truncated ogive), as there are many other shapes that are stable in ballistic flight.

A rough surface or the presence of debris on the feed ramp can knock cartridges off-center, inducing a jam. Polishing a feed ramp is among the tasks commonly performed by gunsmiths.

== See also ==
- List of firearm terminology
