= Justinian (disambiguation) =

Justinian I (483–565), also known as the Great, was a Byzantine emperor.

Justinian may also refer to:

== People ==
- Justinian II Rhinotmetus (669–711), Byzantine Emperor
- Justinian (magister militum per Orientem) (c. 525–582), Byzantine general, nephew of Justinian I
- Justinian of Ramsey Island, 6th-century Welsh hermit
- Sir Justinian Isham, 2nd Baronet (1610–1675), English scholar and politician
- Justinian Marina or Patriarch Justinian of Romania (1901–1977), Patriarch of the Romanian Orthodox Church from 1948 to 1977
- Justinian Jessup (born 1998), American basketball player
- Justinian Rweyemamu (1942–1982), Tanzanian economist and mathematician
- Jusztinián György Serédi (1884–1945), Roman Catholic cardinal and Primate of Hungary
- Justinian Tamusuza (born 1951), Ugandan composer
- Lawrence Justinian (1381–1456), first Patriarch of Venice

== Other uses ==
- Justinian (novel), a novel by Harry Turtledove
- Justinian (1787 ship), a storeship sent to the convict settlement at New South Wales in 1790
- SS Justinian, a Norwegian cargo ship in service from 1946 to 1954

== See also ==
- Justiniana Prima, a Byzantine city that existed from 535 to 615
- Giustiniani, a Venetian family
- Giovanni Giustiniani (1418–1453), navy captain, from the Genoese branch of the family
- Iustinianus (magister militum in Gaul) (died 407), Roman general
