= Kook-jin Moon =

Korean-American businessman

Moon Kook-jin
- Born: Moon Kook-jin; July 17, 1970 (age 56); South Korea
- Education: Harvard University (BA); University of Miami (MBA)
- Occupation: CEO
- Parents: Sun Myung Moon (father); Hak Ja Han (mother)

Moon Kook-jin (born July 17, 1970), also known as Justin Moon, is a Korean American religious leader, businessman, and gun manufacturer. He is the son of Sun Myung Moon and Hak Ja Han. His father is the founder of the Unification Church and his mother is its present leader.

Moon is the founder and owner of Kahr Arms, an American small arms manufacturer, chair of the Sun Moon Education Foundation, and co-founder of Rod of Iron Ministries.

== Early life ==
Moon is the fourth son of Unification Church leaders Sun Myung Moon and Hak Ja Han. He was born in South Korea, and in 1973 moved to the United States, to Tarrytown, New York, with his family. He attended Hackley School, a small private school in Tarrytown. Moon, who later took the first name Justin, recounts his early interest in firearms:

My first experience shooting was with my older brother when I was 14. He also liked guns and took me shooting with friends and family. We would have a great time setting up and shooting targets with an assortment of firearms. Ever since that first shooting experience, I continued to pursue my interest in firearms.

At age 18, Moon got a license to carry a handgun, co-signed by one of his older brothers, but he wasn't satisfied with the small caliber available in a compact handgun. "I had been licensed to carry in New York State since I was 18 and had looked for an ultra-compact 9 mm. pistol," Justin later told American Handgunner magazine. "To my chagrin, I could not find a pistol with the quality of construction and features in design which I felt were appropriate for a carry gun. Therefore, I decided to design an ultra-compact 9 mm. pistol that I could carry." By his junior year of college, he decided to design one himself. "I spent the summer and much of my senior year designing the mechanical layout of the pistol and prototyping various design concepts," he told Handgunner.

Moon graduated magna cum laude from Harvard with an economics degree in 1992. In graduate school, at University of Miami, he obtained an MBA in 1993.

== Kahr Arms ==
In 1993, Moon founded Kahr Arms, choosing the name to be suggestive of two of his affections: German engineering and fast cars. "I wanted to create the ultimate line of concealable pistols," he said.

Kahr Arms' headquarters is in Greeley, Pennsylvania, and it has a manufacturing facility in Worcester, Massachusetts. It specializes in compact and mid-size semi-automatic pistols chambered for popular cartridges, including .380 ACP, 9 mm Luger Parabellum, .40 S&W and .45 ACP. Kahr pistols feature polymer or stainless steel frames, single-stack magazines, and double-action striker firing actions. In 1994 the U.S. federal government banned manufacture and importation of pistol magazines with more than a 10-round capacity. These were the so-called "hi-capacity" magazines, which again became legal to manufacture and import in most states in September 2004, after the relevant federal law expired. This change in federal law rendered many staggered-magazine pistol models (commonly with magazine capacities of 15 or more rounds) less popular in the American market. They were now overly large in light of their newly mandated 10-shot limit. Combat Handguns magazine said that Kahr pistols are "made like a fine Swiss watch." They are used by some police officers as backup weapons.

== Tongil Group ==
In 2005 Moon was appointed chairman of Tongil Group, a South Korean business group associated with the Unification Church. As of 2010, he was in the process of reforming its businesses by hiring new managers and by closing unprofitable operations. Among Tongil Group's chief holdings are The Ilwha Company, which produces ginseng and related products; Ilshin Stone, building materials; Tongil Heavy Industries, machine parts including hardware for the South Korean military; and Segye Ilbo, newspaper. It funds the Tongil Foundation, which supports Unification Church projects, including schools and the Little Angels Children's Folk Ballet of Korea.

== Other activities ==
In 2012 Moon spoke at a conference advocating closer relations between the United States, South Korea, Japan, and other nations in curbing the growing military power of China.

In December 2012 he was appointed Chairman of the Sun Moon Education Foundation, which runs eight schools in South Korea, including the Sun Hwa Kindergarten, Kyungbok Elementary School, Sun Hwa Arts School, Sun Hwa High School for Art, Sun Jeong Middle School, Sun Jeong Tourism High School and Sun Jeong High School.

== See also ==
- List of Unification movement people
- Unification Church
- Unification Church of the United States
