= Islamic dynasties of Iran =

This is a list of kings of Iran of the medieval Islamic period, AD 820 to 1432, arranged genealogically.

For the early Islamic period before 820, see:

- Umayyad dynasty, 661–750
- Abbasid dynasty, 750–1258 (brief/nominal ruling since 820)

For the period after 1506, see:

- Timurid dynasty, 1370–1506
- Turkomans: Qara Qoyunlu (1375–1468) and Ak Koyunlu (1378–1508)
- Safavid dynasty, 1502–1736
- Afsharid dynasty, 1736–1796
- Zand dynasty, 1750–1794
- Qajar dynasty, 1794–1925
- Pahlavi dynasty, 1925–1979

See also Monarchism in Iran.

== Tahirid dynasty (820–872) ==
Tahirid dynasty at its greatest extent.

Throne Name		Original Name	Portrait	Title	Born-Died	Entered office	Left office	Family Relations	Note
Tahirid dynasty, 821–872
1	Taher I			Emir, Governor-General	?–822	821	822	son of Hoseyn son of Mos'ab	
2	Talheh			Governor-General	?–828	822	828	son of Taher I	
3	Abdollah			Governor-General	798–844	828	844		
4	Taher II			Governor-General	?–862	844	862		
5	Mohammad			Governor-General	?–890	862	872		

Mos'eb
Husayn
Tahir I (821–822)^{1}	Ibrahim
Talha (822–828)^{2}	Abdallah (828–845)^{3}	Ishaq
Tahir II (845–862)^{4}	Muhammad	Ubaydallah	Sulayman	Muhammad	Abdullah
Muhammad (862–872)^{5}

== Alavid dynasty (864–928) ==
=== Hasanids ===
Zayd
Hasan al-Da'i ila'l-Haqq; 864–884	Muhammad al-Da'i ila'l-Haqq; 884–900
Hasan al-Da'i ila'l-Haqq; 917–919, 919–923, 927–928

The Samanids captured Tabaristan, and the Alavids fled to Gilan in exile, 900–913.

=== Husaynids ===
Ali
Muhammad
Qasim	Muhammad
Hasan al-Utrush; 914–917
Ja'far; 919, 923–925	Ahmad; 919, 923
Muhammad; 925–927	Husayn; 927, 929

== Saffarid dynasty (861–1003) ==
Map of the Saffarid Dynasty (861 CE-1003 CE).

Throne Name		Original Name	Portrait	Title	Born-Died	Entered office	Left office	Family Relations	Note
Saffarid dynasty, 861–1002
1	Ya'qub			Emir, Great Founder	840–879	872	879	son of Leyth	
2	Amr I			Emir	?–901	870	901	brother of Ya'qub	
3	Tahir I			Emir	883–908	901	908		
4	Al-Layth			Emir	?–928	908	910		
5	Mohammad			Emir	?–?	910	911		
6	Ahmad			Emir, Governor-General	906–963	923	963		
7	Khalaf I			Emir	937–1009	963	1002		

Laith
Ya'qub; 867–879	Taher	Ali	Amr; 879–901
Layth; 908–910	Muhammad; 910–912	Muhammad
Khalaf	Tâhir; 901–908	Ya`qûb
Muhammad	`Amr; 912–913
Ahmad; 922–963
Khalaf; 963–1003

== Samanid dynasty (819–999) ==
Samanid Empire at its greatest extent.

Throne Name		Original Name	Portrait	Title	Born-Died	Entered office	Left office	Family Relations	Note
Samanid dynasty, 819–1005
1	Ahmad I				?–864/5	819	864/5		
2	Nasr I				?–892	864/5	892		
3	Isma'il I			Adel	?–907	892	907		
4	Ahmad II			Shaheed	?–914	907	914		
5	Nasr II			Saeed	?–943	914	942		
6	Nuh I			Hamid	?–954	942	954		
7	'Abd al-Malik I			Rashid	?–?	954	961		
8	Mansur I			Mo'ayyed	?–976	961	976		
9	Nuh II			Radhi	? –997	976	996		
10	Mansur II			Abol Hareth	?–999	996	999		
11	'Abd al-Malik II			Abol Favares	?–?	999	999		
12	Isma'il II			Montaser	?–1005	1000	1005		

Saman Khuda
Asad
Nuh	Ahmad I	Yahya; 819–855	Ilyas
Nasr I 864–892	Isma'il I 892–907
Ahmad II; 907–914
Nasr II; 914–943
Nuh I 943–954
'Abd al-Malik I 954–961	Mansur I 961–976
Nuh II; 976–997
Mansur II; 997–999	'Abd al-Malik II; 999)	Isma'il II al-Muntasir

== Ziyarid dynasty (928–1043) ==
Throne Name		Original Name	Portrait	Title	Born-Died	Entered office	Left office	Family Relations	Note
Ziyarid dynasty, 928–1043 AD
1	Mardavij			Abolhajjaj, Emir	?–934	928	934	son of Ziyar	He was a Zoroastrian.
2	Voshmgir			Abutaher	?–967	934	967	son of Ziyar	
3	Bisotoon			Zahir od-Dowleh	?–976	967–	976	son of Voshmgir	
4	Qabus			Shams ol-Ma'ali, Abolhasan		976	1012	son of Voshmgir	
5	Manuchehr			Falak ol-Ma'ali		1012	1031	son of Qabus	
6	Anushiravan			Sharaf ol-Ma'ali		1031	1043	son of Manuchehr	
7	Keykavous			Onsor ol-Ma'ali				son of Eskandar son of Qabus	
8	Gilanshah							son of Keykavous	

Vardanshah
Ziyar
Mardavij; 930-935	Vushmgir; 935-967
Farhad	Bisutun; 967-977	Qabus; 977-1012
Manuchihr; 1012-1031	Dara	Iskandar
Anushirvan; 1030-1050	Keikavus; 1050-1087
Gilanshah; 1087-1090

== Buyid dynasty (934–1062) ==
Buyid Dynasty at its greatest extent.

Throne Name	Original Name	Portrait	Title	Born-Died	Entered office	Left office	Family Relations	Note
Buyids of Fars (933–1062)
Imad al-Dawla	Abu'l-Hasan Ali		Emir, Amir al-umara	891 – 949	934	949	Son of Buya	Also Senior Buyid Emir (934-949)
Adud al-Dawla	Fanna Khusraw		Emir, Shahanshah	936–983	949	983	Son of Rukn al-Dawla and nephew of Imad al-Dawla	Senior Buyid Emir (976-983) and Emir of Iraq (978-983)
Sharaf al-Dawla	Abu'l-Fawaris Shirdil		Emir, Amir al-umara	962–989	983	989	Son of Adud al-Dawla	Also Senior Buyid Emir and Emir of Iraq (987-989)
Samsam al-Dawla	Abu Kalijar Marzuban		Emir, King	964–998	989	998	son of Adud al-Dawla	Also Emir of Iraq and self-proclaimed Senior Buyid Emir (983-986)
Baha' al-Dawla	Abu Nasr Firuz		Emir, King, Shahanshah	971–1012	998	1012	Son of Adud al-Dawla	Also Emir of Iraq (988-1012) and Senior Buyid Emir (997-1012)
Sultan al-Dawla	Abu Shuja		Emir	992–1024	1012	1024	Son of Baha' al-Dawla	Also Emir of Iraq and Senior Buyid Emir (1012-1021)
Abu Kalijar	Marzuban		Emir, Shahanshah	?1011 – 1048	1024	1048	Son of Sultan al-Dawla	Also Emir of Kerman (1028-1048), Senior Buyid Emir (1037-1048) and Emir of Iraq (1044-1048)
Abu Mansur Fulad Sutun			Emir	?–1062	1048	1054	Son of Abu Kalijar	Lost Fars to Abu Sa'd Khusrau Shah
Abu Sa'd Khusrau Shah			Emir	?–?	1051	1054	Son of Abu Kalijar	Lost Fars to Abu Mansur Fulad Sutun
Abu Mansur Fulad Sutun			Emir	?–1062	1054	1062	Son of Abu Kalijar	Killed by the Shabankara tribal chief Fadluya
Buyids of Rey, Isfahan, and Hamadan (935–1038)
Rukn al-Dawla	Abu Ali Hasan		Emir, Amir al-umara	898–976	935	976	Son of Buya	Also Senior Buyid Emir (949-976)
Fakhr al-Dawla (First reign)	Abu'l-Hasan Ali		Emir	952–997	976	980	Son of Rukn al-Dawla	
Mu'ayyad al-Dawla	Abu Mansur		Emir	941–983	976	983	Son of Rukn al-Dawla	Also Emir of Hamadan (976–983), Jibal (977–983), Tabaristan (980–983), and Gorgan (981–983)
Fakhr al-Dawla (Second reign)	Abu'l-Hasan Ali		Emir, King, Shahanshah	983–997	976	997	Son of Rukn al-Dawla	Also Emir of Hamadan & Tabaristan (984-997) and Senior Buyid Emir (991-997)
Majd al-Dawla	Abu Taleb Rostam		Emir	993–1029	997	1029	Son of Fakhr al-Dawla	Only in Rey, briefly self-proclaimed Senior Buyid Emir
Shams al-Dawla	Abu Taher		Emir	?–1021	997	1021	Son of Fakhr al-Dawla	Only in Isfahan and Hamaedan, briefly self-proclaimed Senior Buyid Emir
Sama' al-Dawla	Abu'l-Hasan Ali		Emir	?–1023	1021	1023	Son of Shams al-Dawla	Only in Hamadan, Deposed by Kakuyids
Buyids of Iraq and Khuzistan (945–1055)
Mu'izz al-Dawla	Abu'l-Husayn Ahmad		Emir, Amir al-umara	915–966	945	966	Son of Buya	
Izz al-Dawla	Abu Mansur Bakhtiyar		Emir, Amir al-umara	943–979	966	979	Son of Mu'izz al-Dawla	Self-proclaimed Senior Buyid Emir (976-978)
Adud al-Dawla	Fanna Khusraw		Emir, Shahanshah	937–983	977	983	Son of Rukn al-Dawla	Also Emir of Fars (949-983) and Senior Buyid Emir (976-983)
Samsam al-Dawla	Abu Kalijar Marzban		Emir, King	964–998	983	987	Son of Adud al-Dawla	Also self-proclaimed Senior Buyid Emir (983-986) and Emir of Fars & Kerman (989-998)
Sharaf al-Dawla	Abu'l-Fawaris Shirdil		Emir, Amir al-umara	962–989	987	989	Son of Adud al-Dawla	Also Emir of Fars (983-989) and Senior Buyid Emir (987-989)
Baha' al-Dawla	Abu Nasr Firuz		Emir	970–1012	989	1012	Son of Adud al-Dawla	Also Senior Buyid Emir (997-1012) and Emir of Fars (999-1012)
Sultan al-Dawla	Abu Shuja		Emir	992–1024	1012	1021	Son of Baha' al-Dawla	Also Senior Buyid Emir (1012-1021) and Emir of Fars (1012-1024)
Musharrif al-Dawla	Abu 'Ali		Emir, Shahanshah, King	1002–1025	1021	1025	Son of Baha' al-Dawla	Closest thing to Senior Buyid Emir (1024-1025)
Jalal al-Dawla	Abu Tahir Jalal al-Dawla		Emir	994–1043	1027	1043	Son of Baha' al-Dawla	
Abu Kalijar	Marzuban		Emir, Shahanshah	?1011 – 1048	1043	1048	Son of Sultan al-Dawla	Also Emir of Fars (1024-1048), Emir of Kerman (1028-1048) and Senior Buyid Emir (1037-1048)
Al-Malik al-Rahim	Abu Nasr Khusrau Firuz		Emir	?–1058	1048	1055	Son of Abu Kalijar	Also Senior Buyid Emir (1051-1055). Deposed by Tughril of the Seljuqs

Imad al-Dawla; 934–949	Rukn al-Dawla; 935–976	Mu'izz al-Dawla; 945–967
Fakhr al-Dawla; 976–997	'Adud al-Dawla; 949–983	Mu'ayyad al-Dawla; 980–983	Izz al-Dawla; 967–978
Shams al-Dawla; 997–1021	Majd al-Dawla; 997–1029	Sharaf al-Dawla; 983–989	Samsam al-Dawla; 983–998	Baha' al-Dawla; 998–1012
Sama' al-Dawla; 1021–1024	Fana-Khusrau	Qawam al-Dawla; 1012–1028	Sultan al-Dawla; 1012–1024	Musharrif al-Dawla; 1021–1025	Jalal al-Dawla; 1027–1044
Abu Kalijar; 1024–1048	Al-Malik al-Aziz
Abu Ali Fana-Khusrau	Abu Mansur Fulad Sutun; 1048–1062	Al-Malik al-Rahim; 1048–1055	Kamrava	Abu'l-Muzaffar Bahram	Abu Sa'd Khusrau Shah
Abu'l-Ghana'im al-Marzuban	Surkhab

== Ghaznavids (963–1187) ==
Ghaznavid dynasty at the greatest extent.

Throne Name		Original Name	Portrait	Title	Born-Died	Entered office	Left office	Family Relations	Note
Ghaznavid dynasty, 955–1186 AD
1	Alptigin			Emir	880–963	955	963		
2	Eshaq			Emir	?–966	963	966	son of Alptigin	
3	Belkatigin			Emir	?–972	966	972		
4	Piritigin			Emir	?–976	972	976		Killed
5	Sabuktigin			Naser od-Din, Abumansur, Emir	942–997	976	997	son of Juq Qarabajkam	
6	Esma'il			Emir	?–?	997	998	son of Sabuktigin	Abdicated
7	Mahmud			Yameen od-Dowleh, Abolqasem, Soltan	971–1030	998	1030	son of Sabuktigin	
8	Mohammad I			Jalal od-Dowleh, Abuahmad, Soltan	997–1040	1030	1030	son of Mahmud	Deposed by Mas'ud I
9	Mas'ud I			Shahab od-Dowleh, Abusa'd, Soltan	997–1040	1030	1040	son of Mahmud	
8	Mohammad I			Jalal od-Dowleh, Abuahmad, Soltan	997–1040	1040	1040	son of Mahmud	Killed by Mowdud
10	Mowdud			Shahab od-Dowleh, Abolfath, Soltan	1011–1049	1040	1049	son of Mas'ud I	
11	Mas'ud II			Soltan	?–?	1049	1049	?	
12	Ali			Baha' od-Dowleh, Abolhasan, Soltan	?–?	1049	1049	son of Mas'ud I	
13	Mohammad II			Soltan	?–?	1049	1049	son of Mowdud	
14	Abd or-Rashid			Ezz od-Dowleh, Abumansur, Soltan	1022–1052	1049	1052	son of Mahmud	
15	Toghrel			Soltan	?–1052	1052	1052		Usurper. Killed
16	Farrokhzad			Jamal od-Dowleh, Abushoja', Soltan	1026–1059	1052	1059	son of Mas'ud I	
17	Ebrahim			Zaheer od-Dowleh, Abolmozaffar, Soltan	1026 or 1040–1098	1059	1098	son of Mas'ud I	
18	Mas'ud III			Ala' od-Dowleh, Abusa'id, Soltan	1061–1114	1098	1114	son of Ebrahim	
19	Shirzad			Kamal od-Dowleh, Soltan	?–?	1114	1115	son of Mas'ud III	
20	Arsalan Shah			Soltan od-Dowleh, Abolfat'h, Soltan	1083–1117/8	1115	1117/8	son of Mas'ud III	
21	Baharm Shah			Yameen od-Dowleh, Abolmozaffar, Soltan	?–1152	1117/8	1152	son of Mas'ud III	
22	Khosrow Shah			Taj od-Dowleh, Abushoja', Soltan	?–1160	1152	1160	son of Baharm Shah	
23	Khosrow Malek			Saraj od-Dowleh, Abolmolook, Soltan	?–1193	1160	1186	son of Khosrow Shah	

Alptigin; 963–977
Ebrahim	Piri	Sebük Tigin; 977–997	Belka Tigin
Ismail; 997–998	Mahmud; 998–1030
Mohammed; 1st, 1030–1031; 2nd, 1041	Mass'ud I 1031–1041
Maw'dud; 1041–1050

== Nasrid dynasty (Sistan) (1029–1225) ==
Throne Name		Original Name	Portrait	Title	Born-Died	Entered office	Left office	Family Relations	Note
Nasrid dynasty (Sistan), 1029-1225
1	Tadj al-Din I Abu l-Fadl Nasr			Malik		1029	1073		Malik of Sistan under the Ghaznavids
2	Baha al-Dawala Tahir ibn Nasr			Malik		1073	1088	son of Tadj al-Din I Nasr	
3	Badr al-Dawala Abu ‘l-‘Abbas ibn Nasr			Malik		1088	1090	son of Tadj al-Din I Nasr	
4	Baha al-Dawala Khalaf ibn Nasr			Malik		1090	1106	son of Tadj al-Din I Nasr	
5	Taj al-Din II Nasr ibn Khalaf			Malik		1106	1164	son of Baha al-Dawala Khalaf	
6	Taj al-Din II Nasr ibn Khalaf			Malik		1164	1169	son of Baha al-Dawala Khalaf	
7	Taj al-Din II Nasr ibn Khalaf			Malik		1106	1164	son of Baha al-Dawala Taj al-Din II Nasr	
8	Taj al-Din III Harb ibn Muhammad ibn Nasr			Malik		1169	1213	grandson of Tadj al-Din I Nasr	Vassal to the Ghurids
9	Yamin al-Din Bahram Shah ibn Harb			Malik		1213	1221	son of Taj al-Din III Harb	Killed during the Mongol invasion, ushering in a period of succession instability and subsequent dissolution.
10	Taj al-Din IV Nasr ibn Bahram Shah			Malik		1221	1221	son of Bahram Shah	
11	Shihab al-Din Mahmud I ibn Harb			Malik		1221	1225	son of Taj al-Din III Harb	
12	Rukn al-Din Mahmud ibn Bahram Shah			Malik		1221	1222	son of Bahram Shah	
13	Abu ‘l-Muzaffar Ali ibn Harb			Malik		1222	1222	son of Taj al-Din III Harb	
14	Ala al-Din Ahman ibn Uthman Nasr al-Din ibn Harb			Malik		1223	1223	son of Taj al-Din III Harb	
15	Uthman Shah ibn Uthman Nasr al-Din ibn Harb			Malik		1225	1225	son of Taj al-Din III Harb	

== Great Seljuq Empire, 1037–1194 ==
A map showing the Great Seljuk Empire at its height, upon the death of Malik Shah I in 1092.

Throne Name		Original Name	Portrait	Title	Born-Died	Entered office	Left office	Family Relations	Note
Seljuq Empire, 1029–1194
1	Toğrül I	Mohammad		Rukn od-Din, Abutaleb, Beg, Sultan	995–1063	1029	1063	son of Mikayil son of Seljuq	
2	Alp Arslan	Mohammad		Azad od-Dowleh, Abushoja', Sultan	1029–1072	1064	1072	son of Chaghri Beg Dawud brother of Toğrül I	killed by a captured soldier
3	Malik Shah I	Hasan		Jalal od-Dowleh, Abolfat'h, Sultan	1055–1092	1072	1092	son of Alp Arslan	killed by assassins
4	Mahmud I			Nasir od-Din, abolqasem, Sultan	1086–1094	1092	1094	son of Malik Shah I	
5	Barkiyaruq	Mohammad		Rukn od-Din, Abolmozaffar, Sultan	1080–1105	1094	1105	son of Malik Shah I	
6	Malik Shah II			Mu'izz od-Din, Abolfat'h, Sultan	1101–?	1105	1105	son of Barkiyaruq	deposed & blinded by Mohammad I
7	Mohammad I	Tapar		Ghiyath od-Din, Abushoja', Sultan	1082–1118	1105	1118	son of Malik Shah I	
8	Sanjar	Ahmad		Mu'izz od-Din, Abolhareth, Sultan	1087–1157	1097	1157	son of Malik Shah I	
9	Mahmud II			Moghith od-Din, Sultan	1104–1131	1118	1131	son of Mohammad I	
10	Dawud			Moghith od-Din, Abolfat'h, Sultan	?–1132	1131	1132	son of Mahmud II	
11	Toğrül II			Rukn od-Din, Abutaleb, Sultan	1109–1134	1132	1134	son of Mohammad I	
12	Mas'ud			Ghiath od-Din, Abolfat'h, Sultan	1109–1152	1134	1152	son of Mohammad I	
13	Malik Shah III			Moghith od-Din, Sultan	1128–1160	1152	1153	son of Mahmud II	
14	Mohammad II			Ghith od-Din, Abushoja', Sultan	1128–1160	1153	1160	son of Mahmud II	
15	Süleyman Shah			Mu'izz od-Din, Abolhareth, Sultan	1118–1162	1160	1161	son of Mohammad I	deposed
16	Arsalan			Rukn od-Din, Sultan	1134–1176	1161	1176	son of Toğrül II	
17	Toğrül III			Rukn od-Din, Abutaleb, Sultan	?–1194	1176	1194	son of Arsalan	killed

== Khwārazm-Shāh dynasty (1077–1231) ==
Khwarazmian Empire at its greatest extent.

Throne Name		Original Name	Portrait	Title	Born-Died	Entered office	Left office	Family Relations	Note
Khwārazm-Shāh Empire, 1153–1231
1	Atsiz			Ala' od-Din, Abolmozaffar, Sultan	?–1156	1153	1156	son of Muhammad I of Khwarazm	Ruling in Khwārazm from 1127
2	Il-Arslan			Taj od-Din, Abolfat'h, Sultan	?–1171	1156	1172	son of Atsiz	
3	Soltanshah	Mahmud		Jalal od-Din, Abolqasem, Sultan	?–1172	1172	1193	son of Il-Arslan	
4	Tekish			Ala' od-Din, Abolmozaffar, Sultan	?–1199	1172	1200	son of Il-Arslan	
5	Mohammad			Ala' od-Din, Qotb od-Din, Abolfat'h, Sultan	?–1221	1200	1221	son of Tekish	
6	Jalal al-Din Mangburni			Jalal al-Din, Sultan	?–1231	1220	1231	son of Mohammad II	Killed

Anushtiginids

Anush Tigin; 1077–1097
Muhammad I 1097–1127
Aziz; 1127–1156
Il-Arslan; 1156–1172
Sultan Shah; 1172–1193	Takesh; 1172–1200
Muhammad II; 1200–1220
Jalal al-Din; 1220–1231

- Mongol invasion of Khwarezmia, 1218–1221

- Mongol Empire, 1231–1256
- Ilkhanate, 1256–1335

== Chupanids (1335–1357) ==
Chupan
Hassan	Timurtash	Demasq Kaja	Shaikh Mahmoud	Bagdad Katun
Hassan Kuchak	Malek Ashraf	Delsad Katun

== Muzaffarids (1335–1393) ==
Sharaf al-Din Mozaffar
Mubariz al-Din Muhammad; 1314–1358
Imad al-Din Ahmad; 1387–1391	Bayazid	Sharaf al-Din Muzaffar	Shah Shuja; 1335–1364; 1366–1384	Qutb Al-Din Shah Mahmud; 1358–1366
Shah Mansur; 1391–1393	Mubariz al-Din Shah Yahya; 1387–1391	Mujahid al-Din Zain Al-Abidin 'Ali; 1384–1387

== Jalayirids (1335–1432) ==
Husein Gurkan	daughter of Arghun
Hasan Buzurg; 1336–1356	Delsad Katun
Uvais I 1356–1374
Alishah	Husain I 1374–1382	Ahmad; 1383–1410	Hasan; 1374
Shah Valad; 1410–1411	Tandura Khatun	Al'a od-Dowleh
Mahmud; 1411–1415	Uvais II; 1415–1421	Mohammed; 1421–1422	Husain II; 1424–1432

== See also ==
- Shah
- Timurid family tree
- Genealogy of Ilkhans
- Safavid dynasty family tree

== Bibliography ==
- Zambaur, E. Manuel (1927). de genealogie et de chronologie pour l'historie de l'Islam. Hannover.
- Bosworth, Clifford Edmund (1967). The Islamic Dynasties: a Chronological and Genealogical survey. Edinburgh.
- The Cambridge History of Iran, vol. 4, The Period From the Arab Invasion to the Saljuqs, Cambridge University Press, 1975.
- The Cambridge History of Iran, vol. 5, The Saljuq and Mongol Periods, Cambridge University Press, 1968.
- The Cambridge History of Iran, vol. 6, The Timurid and Safavid Periods, Cambridge University Press, 1986.
- The Cambridge History of Iran, vol. 7, From Nadir Shah to the Islamic Republic, Cambridge University Press, 1991.
