= Bahram ibn Mafinna =

Buyid Vizier from 1025/6 to 1041/2

Bahram ibn Mafinna (Persian: بهرام بن مافنه), also known as al-'Adil ("the just one") was an Iranian statesman who served as the vizier of the Buyid ruler Abu Kalijar from 1025/6 to 1041/2.

== Biography ==
=== Early career ===
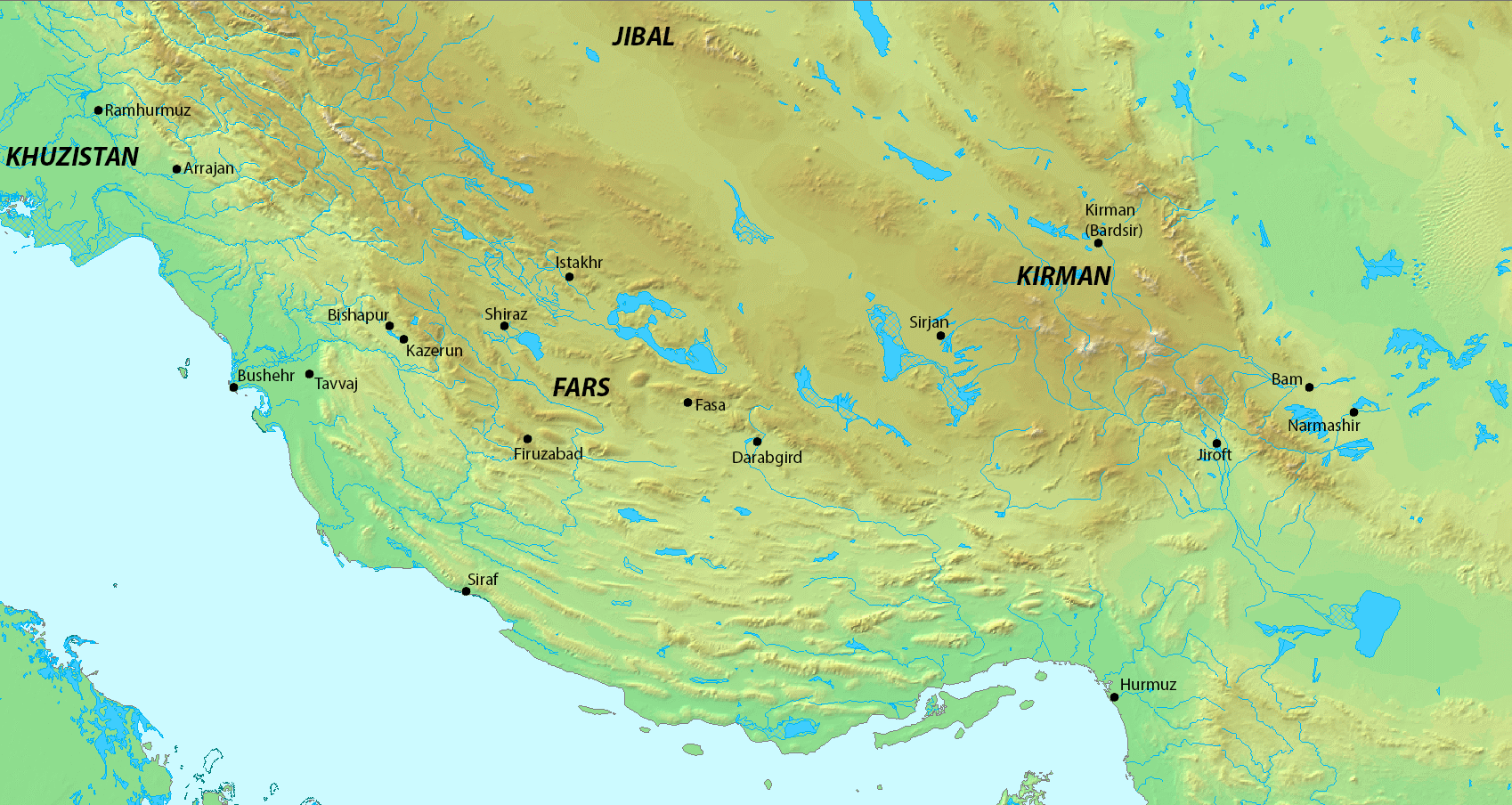
Map of Fars and its surrounding regions in the 9th–10th centuries

Unlike the majority of the Buyid viziers, Bahram bore an Iranian name, and his father also had an Iranian name which was an Arabicized form of Mah-panah. Bahram was born at Kazerun in Fars in 976/7, and when he became older, he began serving the Buyids as a secretary, and later rose to higher offices, eventually in the 1020s becoming the adviser of the Buyid vizier Ibn Makram. In 1024, the Buyid ruler of Fars, Sultan al-Dawla, died, and a succession crisis shortly occurred; His son Qawam al-Dawla, the governor of Kerman, who claimed Fars for himself, rebelled against his own brother Abu Kalijar. Nevertheless, Abu Kalijar managed to gain control over Fars, and successfully defended his domains against his brother.

=== Vizierate ===
However, during the conflict his vizier Ibn Makram was killed, and Bahram was shortly appointed by Abu Kalijar as his new vizier. During his period as a vizier, Bahram's prominent talents as a general and an administrator, and tolerance against other religions, made him famous among the subjects of the Buyid state. He also had good relations with the Ismaili missionary Mu'ayyad fi'l-Din al-Shirazi. In 1028, Qawam al-Dawla was poisoned, and Abu Kalijar shortly conquered Kerman.

In 1030, another rival and relative of Abu Kalijar, Jalal al-Dawla, sent a fleet of 1300 ships under his vizier Abu Ali Hasan to capture Basra from Abu Kalijar, but the expedition eventually proved to be a disaster and ended in a complete defeat for Jalal al-Dawla. Abu Ali Hasan was then taken prisoner, but was soon released. Abu Kalijar shortly sent an army under Bahram, who managed to conquer Khuzistan. Abu Kalijar then made Ahvaz his capital.

In 1033 the Ghaznavids invaded Kerman, with the object of overrunning the Buyid states. However, the financial obligations imposed on the people of Kerman convinced them that Buyid rule would be preferable. In the following year, Bahram ibn Mafinna expelled the Ghaznavids from the province. In 1037/8, a civil war broke in Oman between the princes of the local vassal dynasty in the region. Bahram shortly interfered in the civil war, and brought peace to the region.

Bahram later died in 1041/2, and was succeeded by Dhu'l-Sa'adat as the vizier of Abu Kalijar. According to the historian Hugh N. Kennedy, Bahram was the last great vizier of the Buyids.

== Sources ==
- Bosworth, C. Edmund (2010). "EBN MAFANA". Encyclopaedia Iranica. London et al.: C. Edmund Bosworth.
- Bosworth, C. E. (1975). "Iran under the Buyids". In Frye, R. N. (ed.). The Cambridge History of Iran, Volume 4: From the Arab Invasion to the Saljuqs. Cambridge: Cambridge University Press. pp. 250–305. ISBN 0-521-20093-8.
- Kennedy, Hugh N. (2004). The Prophet and the Age of the Caliphates: The Islamic Near East from the 6th to the 11th Century (Second ed.). Harlow, UK: Pearson Education Ltd. ISBN 0-582-40525-4.

Preceded by Ibn Makram	Vizier of the Buyid amirate of Fars; 1025/6 – 1041/2	Succeeded by Dhu'l-Sa'adat
