= Ala al-Din Abu'l-Ghana'im Sa'd =

Ala al-Din Abu'l-Ghana'im Sa'd (Persian: علاءالدین ابوالغنائم سعد) was an Iranian statesman from the Fasanjas family who served as the vizier of the Buyid ruler al-Malik al-Rahim (r. 1048–1055) from 1048 to 1055.

== Biography ==
Abu'l-Ghana'im Sa'd was the son of Dhu'l-Sa'adat, who had served as the vizier of the Buyid rulers Jalal al-Dawla and Abu Kalijar. During his early life, Abu'l-Ghana'im Sa'd participated in his father's expeditions in Batihah. At the ascension of Abu Kalijar's son al-Malik al-Rahim in 1048, Abu'l-Ghana'im Sa'd was appointed as his vizier, although nothing is known of him during this service.

In 1055, the Seljuq ruler Tughril captured Baghdad and deposed al-Malik al-Rahim. Abu'l-Ghana'im Sa'd was shortly appointed as the governor of Wasit by the latter's vizier Al-Kunduri, but was suspected of preparing a rebellion by strengthening the defenses of the city. This shortly resulted in a Seljuq expedition to Wasit; Abu'l-Ghana'im Sa'd then rebelled and allied himself with al-Basasiri, with whom he openly changed their adherence to the Fatimid Caliphate of Egypt. However, he was finally defeated in 1057 and was captured and executed. His death marked the end of the Fasanjas family.

== Sources ==
- Cahen, Cl. (1965). "Fasandjus". In Lewis, B.; Pellat, Ch. & Schacht, J. (eds.). The Encyclopaedia of Islam, Second Edition. Volume II: C–G. Leiden: E. J. Brill. p. 827. OCLC 495469475.

Unknown	Vizier of the Buyid amirate of Iraq; 1048–1055	Seljuq conquest
