= Al-Malik =

al-Malik (Arabic: الملك), literally "the King", is a name that may refer to:

- The title King of Kings
- One of the 99 names of God in Islam
- Imam Malik
- Abd al-Malik ibn Marwan, Umayyad caliph
- Al-Malik al-Rahim, Buyid rulers
- Al-Malik al-Aziz, Buyid prince
- Al-Kamil, sultan of Egypt

== See also ==
- Malik
