= Makula family =

The Makula family was a Persian noble-family which was mostly active at Baghdad in the 11th-century. The family produced several prominent statesmen, such as Abu Ali Hasan, who served as the vizier of the Buyid dynasty.

== Sources ==
- D. M. Dunlop. "Al-e Makula." Encyclopaedia Iranica. Ed. Ehsan Yarshater. Columbia University. Retrieved 27 January 2016.
