= Al-Ma'ali =

al-Ma'ali is both a given name and a surname. Notable people with the name include:

- al-Malik al-Kamel Naser al-Din Abu al-Ma'ali Muhammed (1180–1238), Ayyubid sultan
- Anushirvan Sharaf al-Ma'ali (11th century), Ziyarid ruler
