= Kitab al-Taji =

- Author: Abu Ishaq Ibrahim al-Sabi
- Language: Arabic
- Subject: History of the Buyid dynasty
- Publication date: c.980-982

Kitab al-Taji, is a historical chronicle, written in Arabic, by Abu Ishaq Ibrahim al-Sabi. Started in c.980 the Kitab al-Taji was patronized by the Shāhanshāh of the Buyid dynasty, 'Adud al-Dawla. Each section of the chronicle was systematically checked by 'Adud al-Dawla, who instructed changes or revisions.

There are no known modern versions of the Kitab al-Taji, though M.S. Khan found a fragment of the chronicle in a work of Zaydi jurisprudence called, al-Gāmiʿ al-Kāfī at the Great Mosque of Sanaa, Yemen.

== Background ==
Abu Ishaq Ibrahim al-Sabi was the chief secretary of 'Izz al-Dawla, Buyid amir of Iraq. Following the downfall and death of Izz al-Dawla, al-Sabi was imprisoned. 'Adud al-Dawla's vizier, Mutahhar, requested al-Sabi be freed to be the seneschal in the capital. As a condition of al-Sabi's release, 'Aḍud al-Dawla ordered that he compose a book about the greatness of the Būyid dynasty. In c. 980, Al-Sabi started writing the Kitab al-Taji in Arabic. Each time he finished a section, al-Sabi would present it to ʿAdud al-Dawla for review, so that it could be revised as needed. Al-Sabi was displeased with the changes imposed by ʿAdud al-Dawla, a fact evident from a comment he made, when asked how his work was going, he replied that he was writing nonsense and falsehoods—an answer that, once relayed to ʿAdud al-Dawla, provoked his anger. Al-Sabi finished the Kitab al-Taji sometime between c. 980-982.

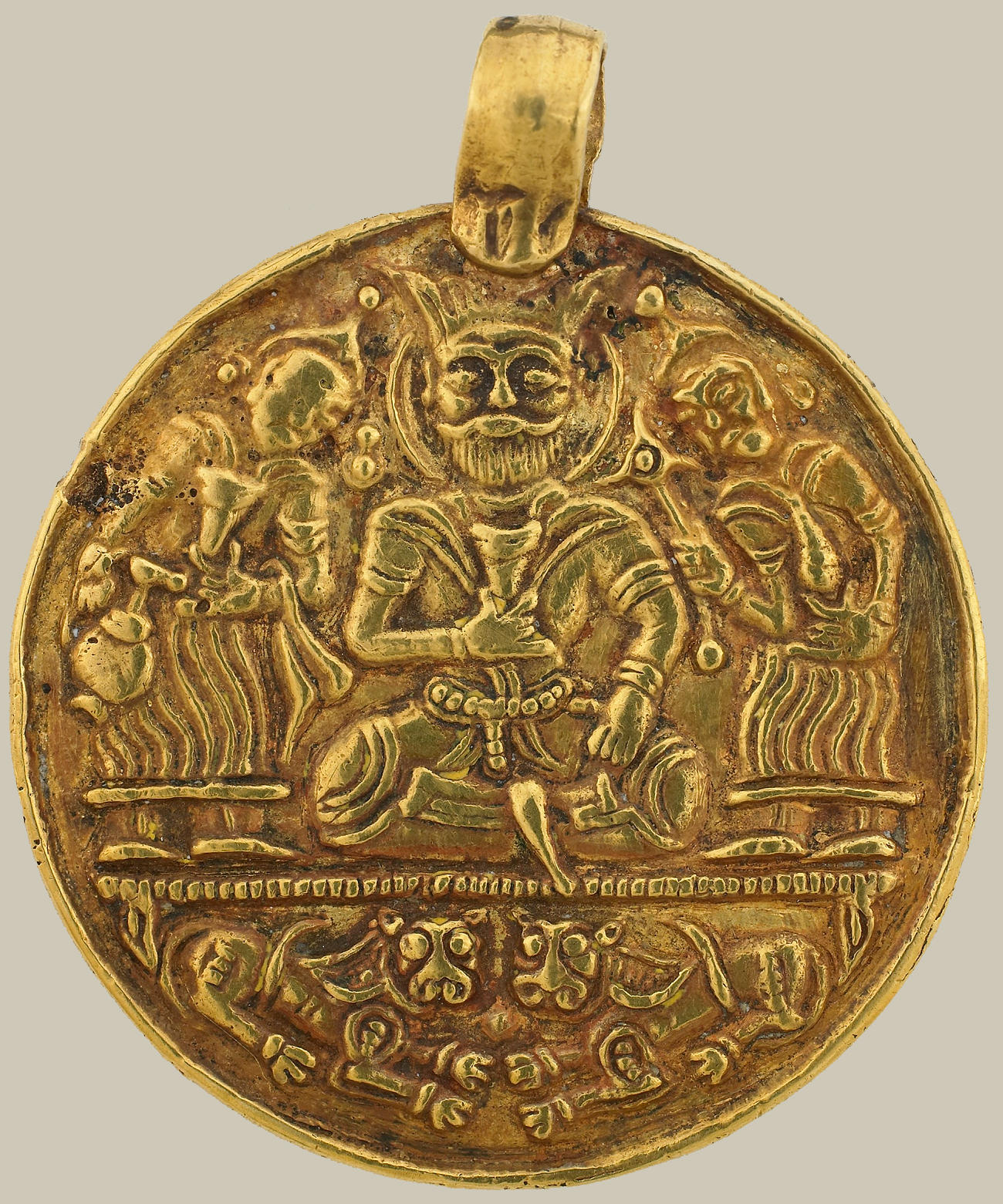
Medallion of Adud al-Dawla patron of the Kitāb al-Ṭājī

== Titles ==
The Kitāb al-Ṭāgī, often referred to as al-Kitāb al-Ṭāgī, was so named because it was written at the order of Ṭāg al-Milla, a title granted to ʿAḍud al-Dawla by Caliph al-Ṭāʾiʿ bi-llāh. Contemporary authors—such as Abu Hayyan al-Tawhidi, al-Thaʿālibī, Ibn al-Nadīm, al-ʿUtbī, and al-Bayhaqi —also cite al-Sabi’s historical work under the title al-Kitāb al-Ṭāgī. However, al-Bīrūnī—though younger and a contemporary of al-Sabi—refers to the work as Kitab al-Tag.

Abu ʿAlī al-Rudhrawārī and Ibn Ḥassūl, who even composed a treatise criticizing the work, referred to it by the same title, and their usage was adopted by numerous later Arabic and Persian historians.

== Composition ==
Although there is no known copy of the Kitab al-Taji, its contents can be partially reconstructed from references made by contemporary and later authors.

Ibn al-Nadīm and al-Thaʿālibī noted the Daylamite's origin, which al-Saji states consisted of Arab and Persians living in Daylam, and their ascent and the establishment of their rule over Iraq and Persia. Al-Thaʿālibī further mentions that the chronicle described the wars fought by Daylamite rulers, their military successes, national character, and related topics. According to Sheila Blair, a fragment of the Kitab al-Taji relates the history of the Daylamites conversion to Islam by the 'Alids.

The ancestors of ʿAdud al-Dawla are highly praised, with numerous anecdotes at the start of the work illustrating these qualities. Additionally, the tribe of Serzil, from which ʿAdud al-Dawla descended, is described as the noblest of all tribes, enhancing the prestige of the Buwayhids.

Numerous medieval historians—including Al-Biruni, Ibn Ḥassūl, Ibn Isfandiyar, Ibn al-Athir, Ibn Ḥallīkān, Ibn Khaldūn, al-Qazwīnī, Zāhir al-Dīn al-Maqrīzī, Mīrḥwand, and Ḥusayn Khwāndmīr —copied the Buyid genealogical table citing the Kitab al-Ṭagi as the source. Some of these historians noted that al-Sabi may have fabricated the ancestry for the Buyids tracing back to Bahram Gur.

The Kitab al-Taji indicates that al-Sabi adopted a distinctly anti-Tahirid, anti-Saffarid, and anti-Samanid perspective. His treatment of the ʿAbbasids was also unfavorable, with little attention devoted to the history of the Caliphs. The pronounced anti-Samanid orientation is straightforward, given that the Samanids were political rivals of the Buyid dynasty. Al-Saji largely disregarded Iraq in his account, focusing primarily on the military, political, and religious developments in Daylam, Gilan, and Tabaristan, the ancestral regions of the Buyids. The Samanids of Bukhara and Khorasan are portrayed not as sovereign rulers but as vassals under the authority of the Abbasids.

== Modern times ==
The Kitāb al-Ṭaji was thought to be lost, although a single manuscript containing an abbreviated portion of the work has been discovered. (Note: Christine D. Baker, assistant Professor of History at Indiana University of Pennsylvania, states only fragments remain of the Kitab al-Taji) This illustration of the Ṭaji is preserved as MS no. 145 in the Maktabat al-Mutawakkiliyya, located in the Great Mosque of Sanaa, Yemen. The chronicle appears at the end of a copy of al-Gāmiʿ al-Kāfī, a work on Zaydī jurisprudence. This is the only known manuscript, in which the text is written in black ink in a continuous paragraph. It consists of twenty-two folios; forty-one and a half written pages.

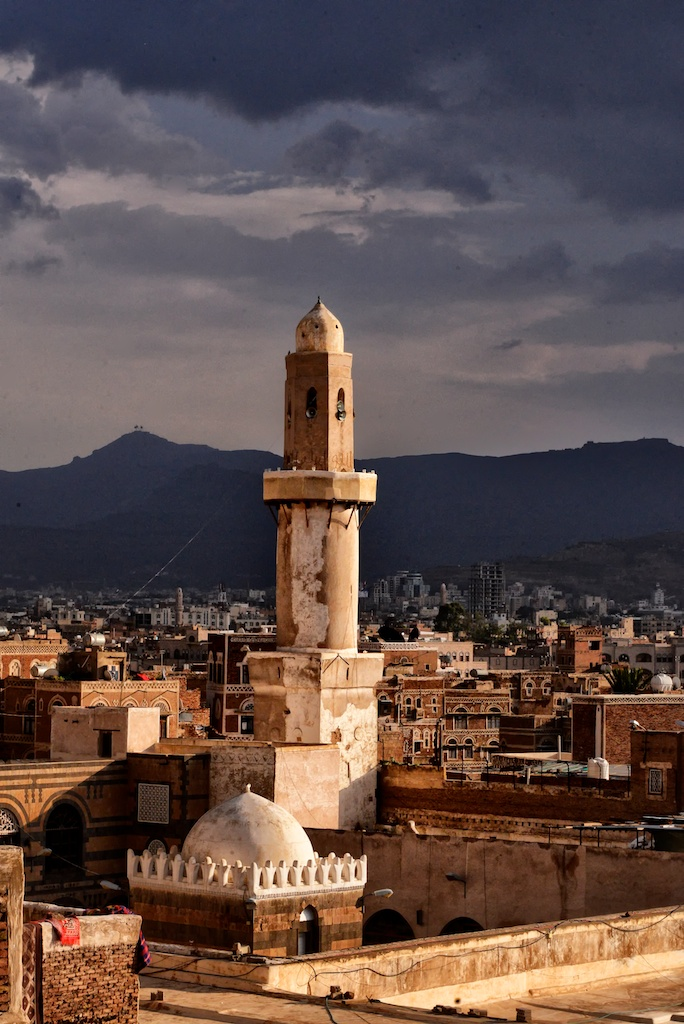
Great mosque of Sana'a, the location for where a fragment of the Kitāb al-Ṭājī resides.

== Sources ==
- Baker, Christine D. (2016). "The lost origins of the Daylamites: the construction of a new ethnic legacy for the Buyids". In Jones-Lewis, Molly; Kennedy, Rebecca Futo (eds.). The Routledge Handbook of Identity and the Environment in the Classical and Medieval Worlds. Routledge. pp. 281–296. ISBN 9781317415701.
- Blair, Sheila S. (1992). The Monumental Inscriptions from Early Islamic Iran and Transoxiana. E.J. Brill. ISBN 90 04 09367 2.
- Khan, M. S. (1965). "A Manuscript of an Epitome of al-Ṣābī's Kitāb al-Tāǧī". Arabica (T. 12, Fasc. 1 (Feb.)). Brill: 27–44.
- Khan, M. S. (1970). "Studies in the "Kitāb al-Tāǧī" epitome of al-Ṣābī". Arabica. T. 17, Fasc. 2 (Jun.): 151–160.
- Madelung, Wilfred (1970). "Further Notes on Al-Ṣabi's Kitāb al-Tājī". Islamic Studies. 9 (1 (MARCH)): 81–88.
