= Abu Ali Hasan =

Buyid Vizier (976/77–1031)

Abu 'Ali Hasan ibn Ali ibn Ja'far ibn Makula (Persian: ابو علی حسن بن علی بن جعفر بن ماکولا), better known simply as Abu Ali Hasan, was a Persian statesman from the Makula family, who served as the vizier of Jalal al-Dawla from 1026 to 1031.

Abu Ali Hasan was born in 976/977. In 1026, he succeeded his cousin Abu Sa'd Abd al-Wahid as the vizier of the Buyid ruler Jalal al-Dawla. In 1030 he was given command of a fleet of 1300 ships in order to capture Basra from Abu Kalijar, but the expedition was a disaster and ended in a complete defeat. He was then taken prisoner, but was soon released. He died the following year in Ahvaz in a family conflict. He was succeeded by his elder brother Abu'l-Qasim Hibatallah.

== Sources ==
- D. M. Dunlop. "Al-e Makula." Encyclopaedia Iranica. Ed. Ehsan Yarshater. Columbia University. Retrieved 5 March 2014.

Preceded by Abu Sa'd Abd al-Wahid	Vizier of the Buyid amirate of Iraq; 1026 – 1031	Succeeded by Abu'l-Qasim Hibatallah
