= Baha al-Dawla =

Amir of Iraq from 988 to 1012

- Amir al-umara
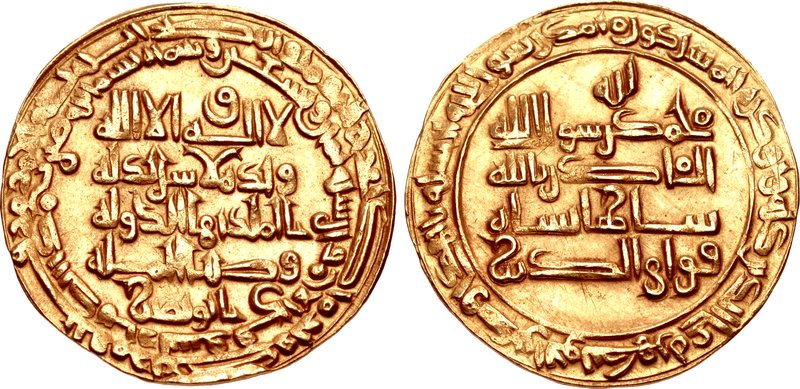
- Gold dinar of Baha al-Dawla

Amir of Iraq
- Reign: 988–1012
- Predecessor: Sharaf al-Dawla
- Successor: Sultan al-Dawla

Amir of Fars and Kerman
- Reign: 998–1012
- Predecessor: Samsam al-Dawla
- Successor: Qawam al-Dawla (in Kerman); Sultan al-Dawla (in Fars)
- Born: 971
- Died: December 22, 1012; Arrajan
- Issue: Qawam al-Dawla; Sultan al-Dawla; Musharrif al-Dawla; Jalal al-Dawla
- Father: Adud al-Dawla
- Religion: Twelver Shia Islam

Abu Nasr Firuz Kharshadh (Arabic: أبو نصر فيروز خوارشاذ; died December 22, 1012), better known by his laqab of Baha al-Dawla (Arabic: بهاء الدوله, romanized: Bahaʾ al-Dawla, lit. 'Splendour of the State') was the Buyid amir of Iraq (988–1012), along with Fars and Kerman (998–1012). His early reign was dominated by struggles with his rival relatives over control of the western Persian provinces, but by 998 he managed to establish his supremacy over the Buyid confederation. His reign nevertheless saw the increasing encroachment of neighbouring powers on Buyid territory, and marks the beginning of the decline of the Buyids' power. He was the third son of 'Adud al-Dawla.

== Early life ==
In 986, a Dailamite officer named Asfar ibn Kurdawayh rebelled against the ruler of Iraq, Samsam al-Dawla, and changed his allegiance to Sharaf al-Dawla. However, Asfar quickly changed his mind, and declared allegiance to the latter's other brother Abu Nasr Firuz Kharshadh, who was shortly given the honorific epithet of "Baha' al-Dawla." However, Samsam al-Dawla, with the aid of Fuladh ibn Manadhar, suppressed the rebellion, and imprisoned Baha al-Dawla. Samsam al-Dawla shortly made peace with Sharaf al-Dawla, and agreed to release Baha al-Dawla. Sharaf al-Dawla shortly betrayed Samsam al-Dawla, conquered Iraq, and had him imprisoned in a fortress.

== Reign ==
Upon the death of Sharaf al-Dawla in 988, Baha' al-Dawla succeeded him, whereupon he took the additional title of Diya' al-Milla. Samsam al-Dawla, who managed to flee from prison, prevented Baha' al-Dawla from gaining all of Sharaf al-Dawla's possessions by taking control of Fars, Kerman and Khuzestan. Both Baha' al-Dawla and Samsam al-Dawla, however, were threatened by their granduncle Fakhr al-Dawla, the ruler of Jibal, who invaded Khuzestan in an attempt to drive a wedge between the two brothers' territories. This act prompted the brothers to draw up an alliance. Samsam al-Dawla recognized Baha' al-Dawla as the ruler of Iraq and Khuzestan, while he himself kept Arrajan, Fars and Kerman. Both promised to consider each other as equals, and took the title of king (malik). In 990, Baha' al-Dawla appointed Sabur ibn Ardashir as his vizier.

In 991 Baha' al-Dawla attempted to gain supremacy over Samsam al-Dawla's realm. He took the ancient Persian title of Shâhanshâh and invaded the latter's territory. His forces were defeated, however, and Samsam al-Dawla regained Khuzestan and even gained control of the Buyid territories in Oman. He then recognized Fakhr al-Dawla as senior amir, submitting to his authority.

Fakhr al-Dawla's death in 997, coupled with Samsam al-Dawla's increasing troubles within his realm, provided Baha' al-Dawla with the opportunity to assert his authority in Persia. He gained the support of the Hasanwayhid ruler Badr ibn Hasanwayh and prepared for the expedition. The invasion began in December 998; scarcely had it commenced when Samsam al-Dawla was killed by one of the sons of 'Izz al-Dawla who had risen in revolt. Baha' al-Dawla then took Shiraz, defeated 'Izz al-Dawla's sons, and was joined by the Dailamites of Fars under Ibn Ustadh-Hurmuz. For the rest of his life Baha' al-Dawla remained in Fars. He also managed to gain indirect control over northern Iran, where Fakr al-Dawla's two sons Majd al-Dawla and Shams al-Dawla recognized him as senior amir by 1009 or 1010. In 1001, Baha' al-Dawla appointed Ibn Ustadh-Hurmuz as the governor of Ahvaz, and one year later, appointed him as the governor of Iraq, where he kept order by solving disputes between different religious sects, and by defeating bandits who had caused chaos in the region.

He also managed to defeat the former governor of Iraq, Abu Ja'far al-Hajjaj, who was supported by Kurds and Shayban Arabs. In 1007, Baha' al-Dawla made peace with the Al-Mazeedi ruler Ali ibn Mazyad, who was given the honorific title of "Sanad al-Dawla", and agreed to become a vassal of Baha' al-Dawla in return for recognition of his rule. This treaty was highly in favor of Baha' al-Dawla, who managed to use Ali ibn Mazyad as the keeper of Buyid influence in Iraq and its surrounding regions. In 1011, Ibn Ustadh-Hurmuz died and was succeeded by Baha' al-Dawla's new vizier Fakhr al-Mulk as the governor of Iraq.

Baha' al-Dawla's reign coincided with the beginning of the decline of the Buyids. The Kurdish chief Badh laid the foundations for the Marwanid amirate in Diyarbakr, while the initially subservient 'Uqaylids of Mosul expanded into Iraq at the Buyids' expense. By the time Baha' al-Dawla died, Baghdad and Wasit were the only two major Iraqi cities directly under his control. In the north, where Fakhr al-Dawla's sons ruled, the Buyid frontier also fell back, as the Ziyarids of Gorgan and Tabaristan permanently wrested themselves from Buyid control. The Ghaznavids kept putting pressure on the Khurasan border, while the Kakuyids began to set up a state in Isfahan.

== Death ==
For various reasons, Baha' al-Dawla did not actively defend the borders. Having gained undisputed control of the Buyid state, he seemed content to allow external enemies to seize territories in the west and north. He died in Arrajan in December 1012. Shortly before his death, he named his son Sultan al-Dawla as his successor.

== Sources ==
- Bosworth, C. E. (1975). "Iran under the Būyids". In Frye, Richard N. (ed.). The Cambridge History of Iran: From the Arab Invasion to the Saljuqs. Vol. 4. Cambridge: Cambridge University Press. pp. 250–305. ISBN 0-521-20093-8.
- Donohue, John J. (2003). The Buwayhid Dynasty in Iraq 334 H./945 to 403 H./1012: Shaping Institutions for the Future. Leiden and Boston: Brill. ISBN 90-04-12860-3.
- Houtsma, M. Th (1905). First Encyclopaedia of Islam: 1913–1936. BRILL. pp. 1–42. ISBN 9789004097964.
- Kennedy, Hugh (2004) [1986]. The Prophet and the Age of the Caliphates: The Islamic Near East from the 6th to the 11th Century (Second ed.). Harlow: Longman. ISBN 978-0-582-40525-7.
- Kraemer, Joel L. (1992). Humanism in the Renaissance of Islam: The Cultural Revival During the Buyid Age. BRILL. pp. 1–329. ISBN 9789004097360.
- Nagel, Tilman (1990). "BUYIDS". In Yarshater, Ehsan (ed.). Encyclopædia Iranica. Vol. IV/6: Burial II–Calendars II. London and New York: Routledge & Kegan Paul. pp. 578–586. ISBN 978-0-71009-129-1.

Preceded by Sharaf al-Dawla	Buyid Amir (in Iraq); 988–1012	Succeeded by Sultan al-Dawla
Preceded by Samsam al-Dawla	Buyid Amir (in Fars); 998–1012	Succeeded by Sultan al-Dawla
Preceded by Samsam al-Dawla	Buyid Amir (in Kerman); 998–1012	Succeeded by Qawam al-Dawla
