= Shams al-Dawla =

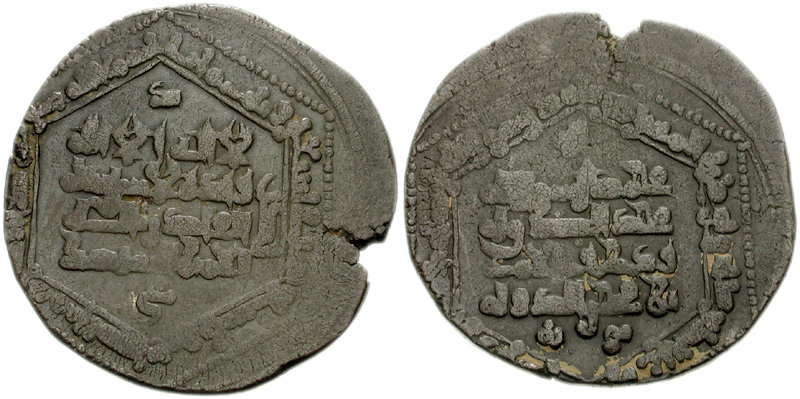
- Coin of Shams al-Dawla

Amir of Hamadan
- Reign: 997-1021
- Predecessor: Fakhr al-Dawla
- Successor: Sama' al-Dawla
- Died: 1021
- Father: Fakhr al-Dawla
- Mother: Sayyida Shirin
- Religion: Shia Islam

Abu Taher (died 1021), better known by his regnal name Shams Al-Dawla ("Sun Of The State"), was the Buyid ruler of Hamadan from 997 to 1021. He was the son of Fakhr al-Dawla.

== Biography ==
Fakhr al-Dawla died in 997; his elder son Abu Taleb Rostam ("Majd al-Dawla") took power in the bulk of his father's possessions in Jibal. Abu Taher himself gained the governorships of Hamadan and Kirmanshah, and was hence known as Shams al-Dawla. Since both sons were still minors their mother, the "Sayyida", assumed the regency.

Both sons originally took the title of Shâhanshâh, implying that they were subordinate to no one. They abandoned the title, however, when they accepted their cousin Baha' al-Dawla's authority by 1009 or 1010 at the latest.

In 1006 or 1007, Majd al-Dawla tried to throw of the Sayyida's regency. However, she gained the support of the Kurdish ruler Badr ibn Hasanwaih and Shams al-Dawla. Their forces laid siege to Ray and fought several battles with Majd al-Dawla's forces. When Ray was finally taken, Majd al-Dawla was imprisoned for a year, and Shams al-Dawla ruled in the city during that time. When the Sayyida released Majd al-Dawla, Shams al-Dawla returned to Hamadan.

Around 1013, following the death of the Badr ibn Hasanwaih, Shams al-Dawla occupied part of the former ruler's territory. Sometime in the later part of his reign, he tried to replace Majd al-Dawla as the ruler of Ray, but the Sayyida foiled his plans. In 1015, Shams al-Dawla called upon the prominent Persian scholar Avicenna in order to treat him. During Avicenna's stay at Shams al-Dawla's court, the latter became his vizier. Shams al-Dawla later died in 1021 and was succeeded by his son Sama' al-Dawla.

Preceded by Fakhr al-Dawla	Buyid Ruler (in Hamadan); 997–1021	Succeeded by Sama' al-Dawla
