= Sultan al-Dawla =

Amir of Fars and Iraq (993–1024)

- Amir al-umara
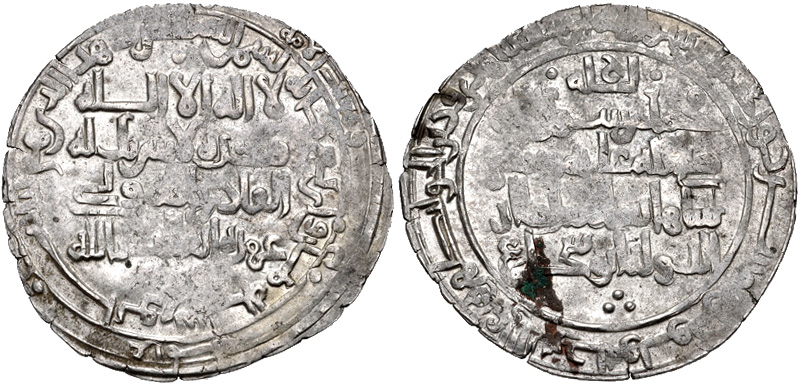
- Coin of Sultan al-Dawla

Amir of Fars
- Reign: 1012–1024
- Predecessor: Baha' al-Dawla
- Successor: Abu Kalijar

Amir of Iraq
- Reign: 1012–1021
- Predecessor: Baha' al-Dawla
- Successor: Musharrif al-Dawla
- Born: 993
- Died: December 1024; Shiraz
- Issue: Abu Kalijar
Names
- Abu Shuja Sultan al-Dawla
- Father: Baha' al-Dawla
- Religion: Twelver Shia Islam

Abu Shuja (Persian: ابو شجاع; 993 – December 1024), better known by his laqab of Sultan al-Dawla (Persian: سلطان الدوله, "Power of the Dynasty"), was the Buyid amir of Fars (1012–1024) and Iraq (1012–1021). He was the son of Baha' al-Dawla.

== Biography ==
Abu Shuja lived in Baghdad during his youth. Shortly before Baha' al-Dawla's death, he named Abu Shuja as his successor. Upon succeeding his father, he took the title Sultan al-Dawla wa 'Izz al-Milla ("Power of the Dynasty and Glory of the Community"). Travelling to his father's capital in Shiraz, he did seek for the traditional investiture by the Abbasid caliph, but instead had the required materials sent to him. He entrusted his oldest brothers Jalal al-Dawla and Qawam al-Dawla with the governorships of Basra and Kerman, respectively. He stayed in Persia for a long time; when he returned to Iraq three years later, he only went to Ahvaz to meet with his governor.

In 1018 Sultan al-Dawla again came to Iraq, in an attempt to maintain friendly terms with the neighboring Amirate of Mosul. Qawam al-Dawla, taking advantage of his brother's presence in the west, invaded Fars with the support of the Ghaznavids. The attack failed, but Qawam al-Dawla's attempt marked the division of the Buyid state. After repulsing Qawam al-Dawla's attack, Sultan al-Dawla returned to Iraq in order to solidify his rule there. The marchlands of the region, which had long resisted Buyid authority, were finally subjugated.

The Turkic mercenaries, however, became discontented over the presence of Sultan al-Dawla's Daylamite troops. They therefore raised a brother of the amir, Musharrif al-Dawla, as their ruler in 1021. After a long series of negotiations, Sultan al-Dawla recognized his brother as "King of Iraq", in exchange for the latter's submission as a vassal. Sultan al-Dawla, however, wanted to retain direct rule over the region, and he invaded with his army. His defeat by Musharrif al-Dawla's forces put an end to this plan, and Iraq became fully independent. The concept of the senior amir temporarily died; each region of the Buyid state was now ruled independently of one another. Having overseen the fragmentation of the Buyids, Sultan al-Dawla died in Shiraz in December 1024. He was succeeded in Fars by his son Abu Kalijar.

== Sources ==
- Bosworth, C. E. (1975). "Iran under the Būyids". In Frye, Richard N. (ed.). The Cambridge History of Iran: From the Arab Invasion to the Saljuqs. Vol. 4. Cambridge: Cambridge University Press. pp. 250–305. ISBN 0-521-20093-8.
- Nagel, Tilman (1990). "BUYIDS". In Yarshater, Ehsan (ed.). Encyclopædia Iranica. Vol. IV/6: Burial II–Calendars II. London and New York: Routledge & Kegan Paul. pp. 578–586. ISBN 978-0-71009-129-1.

Preceded by Baha' al-Dawla	Buyid amir of Fars; 1012–1024	Succeeded by Abu Kalijar
Preceded by Baha' al-Dawla	Buyid amir of Iraq; 1012–1021	Succeeded by Musharrif al-Dawla
