= Abu Mansur Fulad Sutun =

Buyid Emir of Fars from 1048 to 1062

- Buyid Emir of Fars
- Reign: 1048–1062
- Predecessor: Abu Kalijar
- Successor: Shabankara conquest
- Died: 1062; Fars
- Spouse: One of the Chaghri Beg's daughter
- House: Buyid
- Father: Abu Kalijar
- Religion: Shia Islam

Abu Mansur Fulad Sutun (Persian: ابو منصور فولاد ستون, died 1062) was the last Buyid amir of Fars, ruling more or less continuously from 1048 until his death. He was the son of Abu Kalijar.

== Reign ==
=== Struggle for power ===
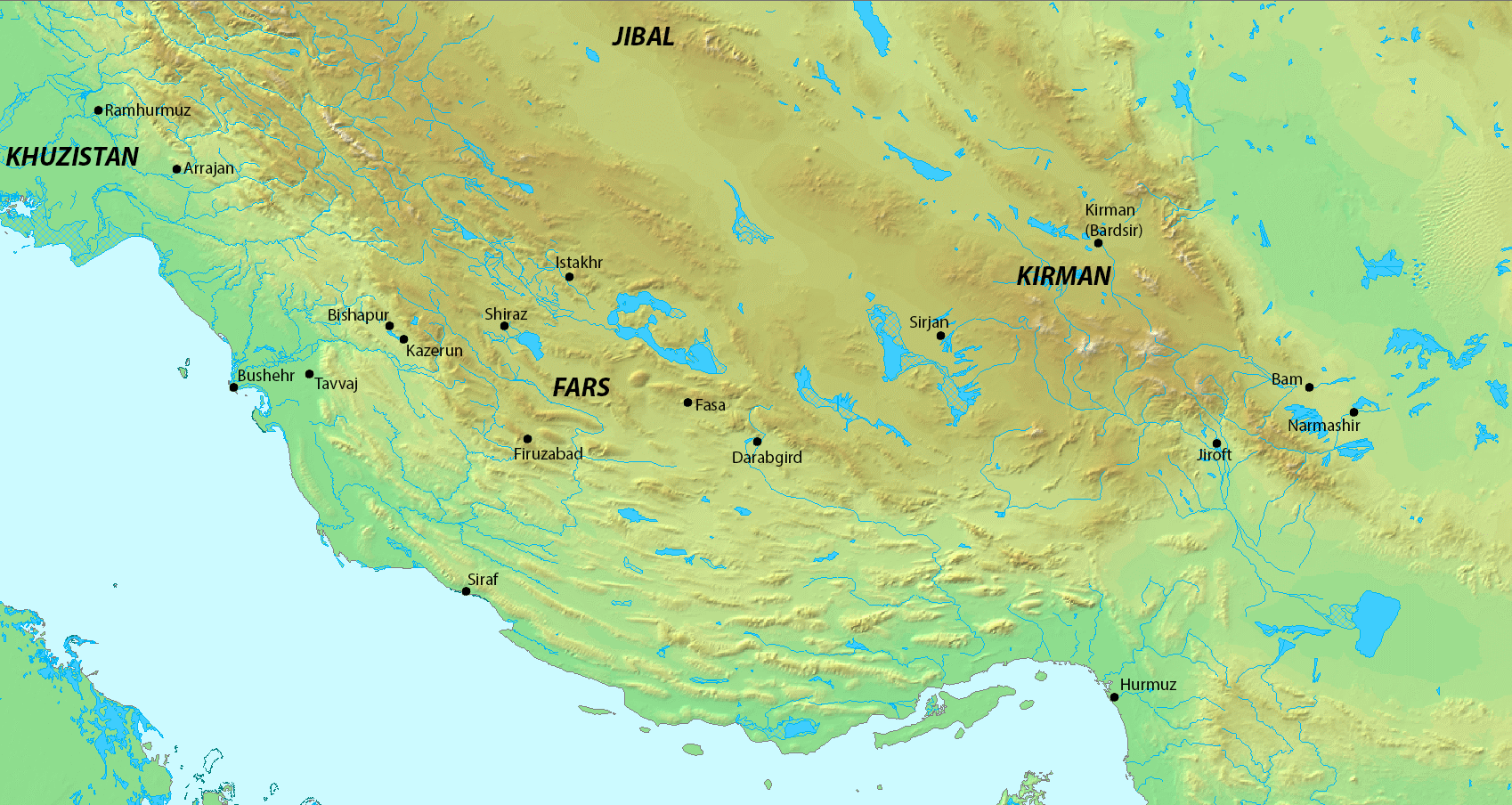
Map of Fars and its surrounding regions in the 10th–11th centuries

After the death of Abu Kalijar in 1048, his eldest son Abu Nasr Khusrau Firuz succeeded him as senior amir in Baghdad and assumed the title "al-Malik al-Rahim." Abu Mansur, however, rose up against his brother and took control of Fars. Al-Malik al-Rahim along with his brother Abu Sa'd Khusrau Shah invaded Fars and occupied Shiraz, also capturing Abu Mansur during the invasion. However, turmoil between the Turks and Daylamites in his army forced them to abandon the province and leave it in the hands of Abu Mansur. Abu Mansur then became the ruler of Fars once again, and captured parts of Ahvaz from Al-Malik al-Rahim. Al-Malik al-Rahim, however, managed to recapture Ahvaz and seize another town named Askar Mukram from Abu Mansur.

In 1051 or 1052 al-Malik al-Rahim's army again invaded Fars and this time defeated Abu Mansur and his allies. Fars was for the next year or so reunited with Iraq and governed by Abu Sa'd Khusrau Shah on al-Malik al-Rahim's behalf. Abu Mansur, however, requested the support of the Seljuk sultan Toghrul Beg, and was able to recapture Shiraz in 1053 or 1054. He then recognized Toghrul Beg as his overlord and placed the sultan's name first in the khutba, in front of al-Malik al-Rahim's. In 1055, a Dailamite military leader named Fuladh captured Shiraz and forced Abu Mansur to withdraw from Fars. Fuladh then made an agreement with Al-Malik al-Rahim where he agreed to acknowledge his authority. However, Al-Malik al-Rahim and Abu Sa'd Khusrau Shah did not trust him, and, along with Abu Mansur, reconquered Shiraz from Fuladh. Abu Mansur then agreed once more to acknowledge the authority of Al-Malik al-Rahim.

=== Seljuq suzerainty ===
In December 1055 al-Malik al-Rahim was arrested and deposed by Toghrul Beg's forces in Baghdad, bringing an end to Buyid rule in Iraq. Abu Mansur, who once again acknowledged Seljuk authority, however, was able to remain in power in Fars for another seven years as a Seljuk vassal. Constant fighting with his brothers, however, weakened his rule, and in 1062 he was killed while fighting against the Shabankara tribal chief Fadluya. The Seljuks shortly afterward entered Shiraz and took control of Fars.

== Notes ==
Preceded by Abu Kalijar	Buyid Amir (in Fars); 1048–1062	Shabankara rule over Fars
