= Musharrif al-Dawla =

- Amir al-umara Amir of Iraq
- Reign: 1021 – 1025
- Predecessor: Sultan al-Dawla
- Successor: Jalal al-Dawla
- Born: 1003
- Died: May 1025 (aged 21–22)
- House: Buyid
- Father: Baha' al-Dawla
- Religion: Shia Islam

Abu 'Ali (Persian: ابو علی), better known by his laqab of Musharrif al-Dawla (1003 – May 1025), was the Buyid amir of Iraq (1021–1025). He was the youngest son of Baha' al-Dawla.

== Biography ==
In 1021 the Turkish establishment in Baghdad, which had become upset over the influence of amir Sultan al-Dawla's Daylamite troops, raised Abu 'Ali to power. Given the title "Musharrif al-Dawla", he decided to negotiate with Sultan al-Dawla. At length, he became Sultan al-Dawla's vassal and was given a heretofore unused title, the "King of Iraq". The latter, however, wanted direct control over the region, and invaded Iraq. He was defeated by Musharrif al-Dawla's army. Musharrif al-Dawla thereafter considered himself as Sultan al-Dawla's equal and assumed the title of "Shahanshah". For the rest of his reign, he was forced to placate the troops that had brought him to power.

During his reign, Musharrif al-Dawla undertook a campaign against the Kakuyids. After establishing a state in Isfahan that was independent of the Buyids, they had steadily expanded, culminating with their seizure of Hulwan from the 'Annazids. Musharrif al-Dawla forced them to withdraw from that city, but the Kakuyids maintained their hold elsewhere, and peace was declared between the two sides. The truce was cemented with a marriage alliance. Despite his success at keeping his neighbors in check, Musharrif al-Dawla failed to solve the internal problems of his state. These problems were largely intact when he died in mid-1025. The army, which took charge of the succession, took more than two years before finally definitively agreeing to Jalal al-Dawla as amir.

Preceded by Sultan al-Dawla	Buyid Amir (in Iraq); 1021–1025	Succeeded by Jalal al-Dawla
