= Gilanshah =

Ziyarid emir from 1087 to 1090

Gilanshah (Persian: گیلانشاه) was the last ruler of the Ziyarid dynasty from c. 1087 to 1090. He was the son and successor of Keikavus. Little is known about Gilanshah; his kingdom was invaded by the Nizari Ismaili state in 1090, ending Ziyarid rule in Tabaristan.

== Sources ==
- Madelung, W. (1975). "The Minor Dynasties of Northern Iran". In Frye, Richard N. (ed.). The Cambridge History of Iran: From the Arab Invasion to the Saljuqs. Vol. 4. Cambridge: Cambridge University Press. pp. 198–249. ISBN 0-521-20093-8.
- Bosworth, C. E. (1968). "The Political and Dynastic History of the Iranian World (A.D. 1000–1217)". In Boyle, John Andrew (ed.). The Cambridge History of Iran: The Saljuq and Mongol Periods. Vol. 5. Cambridge: Cambridge University Press. pp. 1–202. ISBN 0-521-06936-X.
- Marlow, Louise (2018). "Kay Kāʾūs b. Iskandar". In Fleet, Kate; Krämer, Gudrun; Matringe, Denis; Nawas, John; Rowson, Everett (eds.). Encyclopaedia of Islam (3rd ed.). Brill Online. ISSN 1873-9830.

Preceded by Keikavus	Ziyarid ruler c. 1087–1090	Succeeded by None
