= Al-Malik al-Aziz =

Abu Mansur Khusrau Firuz (Persian: ابو منصور خسرو فیروز), better known by his laqab of Al-Malik al-Aziz (Arabic: الملك العزيز, "the strong king"), was a Buyid prince who served as the governor of Wasit. He was the son of Jalal al-Dawla.

During his father's lifetime, Al-Malik al-Aziz served as the governor of Wasit, and was considered his heir. However, when his father died in 1044, Abu Kalijar, the Buyid ruler of Fars and Kerman, invaded Iraq, and captured Baghdad. Al-Maik al-Aziz managed to flee from Baghdad, and take refuge with the Mazyadids, and then with the Uqaylids. He also made some fruitless attempts to capture Iraq and regain his throne. He later died in 1049 at Mayyafariqin.
