= Abu Ali Fana-Khusrau =

Son of the Buyid ruler Abu Kalijar (died 1094)

Abu Ali Fana-Khusrau (Persian: ابو علی فنا-خسرو), was the son of the Buyid ruler Abu Kalijar. After the fall of the Buyid Empire in 1055, Abu Ali spent the rest of his life residing at Naubandajan in Fars, where he became an honored figure among the Seljuq sultans. He died in 1094, and was given an honorable funeral.

== Sources ==
- Frye, R.N. (1975). "The Saljuq and Mongol periods". In Frye, R.N. (ed.). The Cambridge History of Iran, Volume 5: The Iranian world. Cambridge: Cambridge University Press. pp. 1–659. ISBN 0-521-20093-8.
