= Sama' al-Dawla =

Sama' al-Dawla was the Buyid ruler of Hamadan (1021-1023 or 1024). He was the son of Shams al-Dawla.

Upon his father's death, Sama' al-Dawla succeeded him to the governorship of that province. Only after a short reign, however, the Kakuyid ruler Muhammad ibn Rustam Dushmanziyar overran Hamadan and ended Sama' al-Dawla's rule.

Preceded by Shams al-Dawla	Buyid Ruler (in Hamadan); 1023/4	Succeeded by None
