= Abu Sa'd Khusrau Shah =

Buyid amir of Fars during 1049 and from 1051 to 1054

Abu Sa'd Khusrau Shah (Persian: ابو سعد خسرو شاه), was the Buyid amir of Fars (1049 and 1051–1054). He was the son of Abu Kalijar.

== Biography ==
Upon his father's death, Abu Sa'd Khusrau Shah's brother Abu Nasr Khusrau Firuz took the throne in Baghdad with the title "al-Malik al-Rahim". His succession to the entire Buyid Empire was prevented by his brother Abu Mansur Fulad Sutun, who took control of Fars. The two then entered into a struggle for supremacy. In 1049, Al-Malik al-Rahim then sent an army under Abu Sa'd Khusrau Shah, who managed to capture Shiraz and also capture Abu Mansur. However, Abu Sa'd Khusrau was shortly forced back to Iraq due to increased hostility between the Turks and the Dailamite troops there. At about the same time, the Buyid lands in Oman were permanently lost. Abu Mansur then managed to become the ruler of Fars once again, and captured parts of Ahvaz from Al-Malik al-Rahim. Al-Malik al-Rahim, however, managed to recapture Ahvaz and seize another town named Askar Mukram from Abu Mansur. The next year, a combined army of Arab and Kurdish tribes ravaged Ahvaz and its surrounding regions, but were later repelled by Al-Malik al-Rahim.

In 1051 or 1052, Al-Malik al-Rahim once again defeated Abu Mansur and captured Fars. He then appointed Abu Sa'd Khusrau Shah as governor of the province. Shiraz, however, was lost in 1053 or 1054, when Abu Mansur returned as a vassal to the Seljuk ruler Toghrül. In 1055, a Dailamite military leader named Fuladh captured Shiraz and expelled Abu Mansur from Fars. Fuladh then made an agreement with Al-Malik al-Rahim where he agreed to acknowledge his authority. However, Al-Malik al-Rahim and Abu Sa'd Khusrau Shah did not trust him, and, along with Abu Mansur, reconquered Shiraz from Fuladh. Abu Mansur then agreed to acknowledge the authority of Al-Malik al-Rahim.

Toghrül later made Al-Malik al-Rahim his vassal. However, barely a week had passed before the citizens of Baghdad began to complain to the amir about looting committed by the Seljuk troops, and asked him to expel them out of the city. Toghrül then summoned him to his camp to negotiate over the issue. When he arrived, he was accused of acts of retribution against the Seljuk troops, and was arrested over the caliph's protests. What happened to Abu Sa'd Khusrau after this event is not known, but he probably died a few years later.

Preceded by Abu Mansur Fulad Sutun	Buyid Amir (in Fars) ca. 1051–ca. 1054	Succeeded by Abu Mansur Fulad Sutun
