= Abu Kalijar =

Buyid amir of Fars and Kerman (died 1048)

Abu Kalijar Marzuban
- Amir al-umara
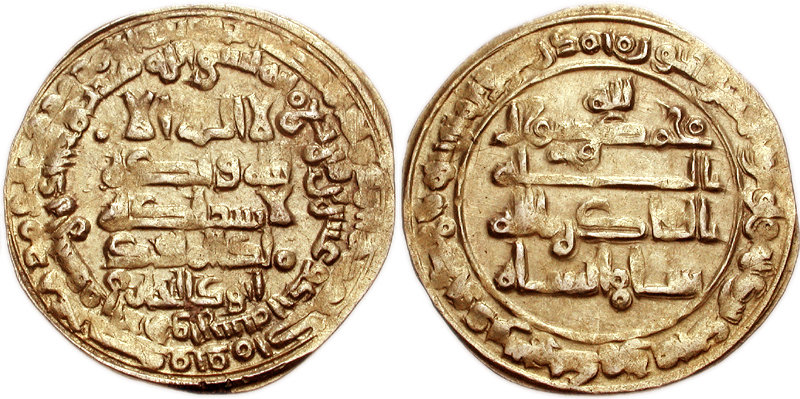
- Coin of Abu Kalijar

Amir of Fars
- Reign: 1024–1048
- Predecessor: Sultan al-Dawla
- Successor: Abu Mansur Fulad Sutun

Amir of Kerman
- Reign: 1028–1048
- Predecessor: Qawam al-Dawla
- Successor: Seljuq conquest

Amir of Iraq
- Reign: 1044–1048
- Predecessor: Jalal al-Dawla
- Successor: Al-Malik al-Rahim
- Born: 1010; Basra
- Died: October 1048 (aged 38)
- Issue: Abu Ali Fana-Khusrau; Abu Mansur Fulad Sutun; Al-Malik al-Rahim; Kamrava; Abu'l-Muzaffar Bahram; Abu Sa'd Khusrau Shah
- House: Buyid
- Father: Sultan al-Dawla
- Religion: Shia Islam

Abu Kalijar Marzuban (Persian: ابوکالیجار مرزبان; died October 1048) was the Buyid amir of Fars (1024–1048), Kerman (1028–1048) and Iraq (1044–1048). He was the eldest son of Sultan al-Dawla.

== Struggle for supremacy over the Buyid kingdom ==
The death of Sultan al-Dawla in 1024 prompted a succession crisis within the Buyid state. Not until 1027 did the army in Baghdad pick his brother Jalal al-Dawla as ruler. In the meantime Abu Kalijar had built up his power in Fars, although the first several years of his reign were marked by the oversight of his tutor, a eunuch named Sandal, and entered into a conflict with the Buyid ruler of Kerman, Qawam al-Dawla. The latter's death in 1028 allowed Abu Kalijar to occupy the province. In 1030, Jalal al-Dawla sent a fleet of 1300 ships under his vizier Abu Ali Hasan to capture Basra from Abu Kalijar, but the expedition was a disaster and ended in a complete defeat. Abu Ali Hasan was then taken prisoner, but was soon released. Abu Kalijar shortly sent an army under his vizier Bahram ibn Mafinna, who managed to conquer Khuzistan. Abu Kalijar then made Ahvaz his capital.

In 1033 the Ghaznavids invaded Kerman, with the object of overrunning the Buyid states. However, the financial obligations imposed on the people of Kerman convinced them that Buyid rule would be preferable. In the following year, Bahram ibn Mafinna expelled the Ghaznavids from the province.

Abu Kalijar also wanted to gain control of Iraq. Around 1037 his army marched on Baghdad; although he did not take the city, Jalal al-Dawla recognized him as senior amir. Abu Kalijar subsequently used the title "Shahanshah" on his coins. However, the amir of Mosul, along with the Arab tribe of the Asadids, supported Jalal al-Dawla, and the two Buyids were forced to come to a compromise. Both rulers used the same titles and were genuinely independent of each other. Iraq therefore stayed out of Abu Kalijar's control, though he managed to make his son the governor of Basra. In 1041/1042, Bahram ibn Mafinna died, and was succeeded by Dhu'l-Sa'adat as the vizier of Abu Kalijar.

Jalal al-Dawla's death in 1044 gave Abu Kalijar possession of Iraq. His control over the region, however, remained weak; his capital therefore remained in Ahvaz, instead of being moved to Baghdad. In the meantime, the Kakuyids of Isfahan were torn between two rival brothers, and Abu Kalijar attempted to force them to submit to his authority. They preferred, however, to recognize the Seljuks as their overlords. During the same year, Abu Kalijar strengthened the walls of Shiraz.

== Height of power and death ==
Abu Kalijar continued to cement his authority by traveling to Baghdad, where he received the title of senior amir as well as the title "Muhyi al-Din" (Arabic: محي الدین, romanized: Muḥyī al-Dīn, lit. 'Reviver of Religion'). Several minor rulers of Mesopotamia recognized his authority, and even the Kakuyids declared their allegiance. This last act, however, prompted a Seljuk intervention, and Abu Kalijar decided to negotiate and create a marriage alliance. The Buyid governor of Kerman, however, decided to submit to the Seljuk Qavurt. Abu Kalijar marched to reassert his authority, only to be met with an ambassador of the governor, who brought gifts and a promise to renew his allegiance. Shortly afterwards, Abu Kalijar died at the age of thirty-eight. He was succeeded by his son al-Malik al-Rahim, but the Buyids suffered a succession struggle soon after his death, and Kerman entered into the Seljuk orbit.

== Sources ==
- Bosworth, C. E. (1975). "Iran under the Būyids". In Frye, Richard N. (ed.). The Cambridge History of Iran: From the Arab Invasion to the Saljuqs. Vol. 4. Cambridge: Cambridge University Press. pp. 250–305. ISBN 0-521-20093-8.
- Nagel, Tilman (1990). "BUYIDS". In Yarshater, Ehsan (ed.). Encyclopædia Iranica. Vol. IV/6: Burial II–Calendars II. London and New York: Routledge & Kegan Paul. pp. 578–586. ISBN 978-0-71009-129-1.
- Kennedy, Hugh (2004) [1986]. The Prophet and the Age of the Caliphates: The Islamic Near East from the 6th to the 11th Century (Second ed.). Harlow: Longman. ISBN 978-0-582-40525-7.

Preceded by Sultan al-Dawla	Buyid Amir (in Fars); 1024–1048	Succeeded by Abu Mansur Fulad Sutun
Preceded by Qawam al-Dawla	Buyid Amir (in Kerman); 1028–1048	Seljuk conquest
Preceded by Jalal al-Dawla	Buyid Amir (in Iraq); 1044–1048	Succeeded by al-Malik al-Rahim
