= Qawam al-Dawla =

Buyid ruler of Kerman from 1012 to 1028

Abu'l-Fawaris (Persian: ابوالفوارس), better known by his regnal name Qawam al-Dawla (Persian: قوام‌الدوله; April 1000 – October/November 1028), was the Buyid ruler of Kerman (1012–1028). He was the son of Baha' al-Dawla.

== Biography ==
When Abu'l-Fawaris' brother Sultan al-Dawla became the senior amir of the Buyids in 1012, he appointed Abu'l-Fawaris (thereafter known as Qawam al-Dawla, "Foundation of the State") as governor of Kerman. When Sultan al-Dawla left Fars for Iraq in around 1017, Qawam al-Dawla decided to attack. With the support of the Ghaznavids, he invaded and occupied Fars. A counterattack expelled him from that province, but he managed to retain his hold on Kerman. Sultan al-Dawla died in 1024, and his son Abu Kalijar managed to gain control of Fars. Eventually, Qawam al-Dawla and Abu Kalijar engaged in hostilities against each other; the fighting ceased only when Qawam al-Dawla died in late 1028. He was poisoned; Abu Kalijar took over Kerman.

Preceded by Baha' al-Dawla	Buyid Governor (in Kerman); 1012–1028	Succeeded by Abu Kalijar
