= Al-Malik al-Rahim =

Buyid Emir of Iraq from 1048 to 1055

- Amir al-umara Amir of Iraq
- Reign: 1048–1055
- Predecessor: Abu Kalijar
- Successor: Muhammad Tughril (as Seljuq sultan)
- Died: 1058/59; Ray
- Issue: Abu'l-Ghana'im al-Marzuban
- House: Buyid
- Father: Abu Kalijar
- Religion: Shia Islam

Abu Nasr Khusrau Firuz (Persian: ابونصر خسرو فیروز, died 1058 or 1059), better known by his laqab of Al-Malik al-Rahim (Arabic: الملک الرحیم, "the merciful king") was the last Buyid amir of Iraq (October 1048 – 1055). He was the son of Abu Kalijar.

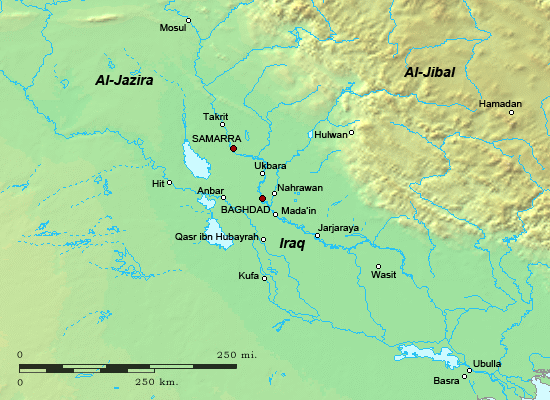
Map of Iraq region in the 9th–11th centuries

== Life ==
=== Independent rule ===
Upon his father's death, he took the throne in Baghdad with the title "al-Malik al-Rahim". His succession to the entire Buyid Empire was prevented by his brother Abu Mansur Fulad Sutun, who took control of Fars. The two then entered into a struggle for supremacy. During this period Al-Malik al-Rahim appointed the Fasanjas Ala al-Din Abu'l-Ghana'im Sa'd as his vizier. In 1049, Al-Malik al-Rahim sent an army under his brother Abu Sa'd Khusrau Shah, who managed to capture Shiraz and also capture Abu Mansur.

However, Abu Sa'd Khusrau was shortly forced back to Iraq due to increased hostility between the Turks and the Dailamite troops there. At about the same time, the Buyid lands in Oman were permanently lost. Abu Mansur then became the ruler of Fars once again, and captured parts of Ahvaz from Al-Malik al-Rahim. Al-Malik al-Rahim, however, managed to recapture Ahvaz and seize another town named Askar Mukram from Abu Mansur. The next year, a combined army of Arab and Kurdish tribes ravaged Ahvaz and its surrounding regions, but were later repelled by Al-Malik al-Rahim.

In 1051 or 1052, Al-Malik al-Rahim once again defeated Abu Mansur and captured Fars. He then appointed Abu Sa'd Khusrau Shah as governor of the province. Shiraz, however, was lost in 1053 or 1054, when Abu Mansur returned as a vassal to the Seljuk ruler Toghrül. In 1055, a Dailamite military leader named Fuladh captured Shiraz and forced Abu Mansur to withdraw from Fars.

Fuladh then made an agreement with Al-Malik al-Rahim where he agreed to acknowledge his authority. However, Al-Malik al-Rahim and Abu Sa'd Khusrau Shah did not trust him, and, along with Abu Mansur, reconquered Shiraz from Fuladh. Abu Mansur then once again agreed to acknowledge the authority of Al-Malik al-Rahim.

=== Seljuq suzerainty ===
Toghrül, however, soon decided to put an end to the Buyid authority in Iraq. On December 17, 1055, he arrived in Baghdad as a pilgrim on his way to Mecca, and made it known that after he returned, he would make war with the Fatimids. The Abbasid caliph, who had initially preferred the weak Buyids over the strong Seljuks despite the latter's Sunni religion, declared that Toghrül's name should be recited before that of al-Malik al-Rahim in the Friday sermons. The amir thereupon became a vassal of the Seljuks.

Barely a week had passed, however, before the citizens of Baghdad began to complain to the amir about looting committed by the Seljuk troops, asking him to expel them out of the city. Toghrül then summoned him to his camp to negotiate over the issue. When he arrived, he was accused of acts of retribution against the Seljuk troops, and was arrested over the caliph's protests. Al-Malik al-Rahim was the last Buyid ruler of Iraq. He died a prisoner in Ray in 1058 or 1059.

Preceded by Abu Kalijar	Buyid Amir (in Iraq); 1048–1055	Seljuk rule over Iraq
