= Jalal al-Dawla =

Buyid amir of Iraq from 1027 to 1044

- Amir of Iraq; Amir al-umara
- Reign: 1027–1044
- Predecessor: Musharrif al-Dawla
- Successor: Abu Kalijar
- Born: 993 or 994
- Died: March 1044
- Issue: Al-Malik al-Aziz; Abu Mansur Ali; Unnamed daughter
Names
- Laqab: Jalal al-Dawla; Kunya: Abu Tahir; Given name: Firuz Khusrau
- Father: Baha' al-Dawla
- Religion: Shia Islam

Abu Tahir Firuz Khusrau (Persian: ابوطاهر فیروزخسرو), better known by his laqab of Jalal al-Dawla (993 or 994 – March 1044), was the Buyid amir of Iraq (1027–1044). He was the son of Baha' al-Dawla.

== Biography ==
In 1012, Jalal Al-Dawla's father died. His brother, Sultan al-Dawla, came to the throne and appointed him as governor of Basra. He ruled there up until Musharrif al-Dawla, who had taken control of Iraq, died in 1025. His death caused a succession crisis. Jalal al-Dawla, with the aid of his vizier Abu Sa'd Abd al-Wahid, tried to capture Baghdad, but was shortly repelled by a Buyid army which had taken control of the city. Jalal al-Dawla then had Abu Sa'd imprisoned, and appointed the latter's cousin Abu Ali Hasan as his vizier.

The army took more than two years before choosing Jalal al-Dawla as his father's successor in June 1027. He subsequently became involved in a bitter fight with his nephew Abu Kalijar, who controlled Fars and Kerman. Abu Kalijar shortly managed to seize Basra from him. In 1030, Jalal al-Dawla sent a fleet of 1300 ships under his vizier Abu Ali Hasan to capture Basra, but the expedition was a disaster and ended in a complete defeat. Abu Ali Hasan was then taken prisoner, but was soon released. He died the following year in Ahvaz in a family conflict. Jalal al-Dawla then appointed the latter's elder brother Abu'l-Qasim Hibatallah as his vizier. Jalal al-Dawla and Abu Kalijar were not always enemies; for example, Jalal al-Dawla provided support to Abu Kalijar when the Ghaznavids invaded Kerman in 1033.

Jalal al-Dawla was however also forced to deal with problems in his own realm, which consisted of little more than Baghdad and Wasit following Abu Kalijar's seizure of Basra. His army was continually hostile, a situation which devolved to the point where the Abbasid caliph often acted as a mediator between the amir and his troops. A mutiny led by a Turk named Barstoghan in 1036 or 1037 was therefore not surprising. The revolt provided Abu Kalijar with an opportunity to invade. He failed to take Baghdad, but gained Jalal al-Dawla's allegiance. The latter, however, had the support of the Uqailid amir of Mosul and the Arab tribe of the Asadids, and he was soon restored to his full power as an independent ruler. Jalal al-Dawla's vizier Abu'l-Qasim Hibatallah was choked to death in 1038. He continued his rule in Iraq until his death in 1044, following which Abu Kalijar managed to gain control of Iraq, and expel Jalal al-Dawla's son and heir Al-Malik al-Aziz.

A daughter of Jalal al-Dawla was married to Rashid al-Dawla Mahmud, the Mirdasid emir of Aleppo.

| Preceded by Musharrif al-Dawla | Buyid Amir (in Iraq); 1027–1044 | Succeeded by Abu Kalijar |
