= Tilman Nagel =

German orientalist (born 1942)

Tilman Nagel (born 19 April 1942, in Cottbus) is a German Orientalist and Professor Emeritus at the University of Göttingen and member of the academie of science there. He is the author of books including The Koran and Timor the Conqueror. His book, Mohammed: Life and Legend, depicts what he sees as the historic reality of the life of Muhammad. One reviewer considers this "monumental piece of research" to remain "highly relevant for decades to come".

== Published works ==
- Alexander der Große in der frühislamischen Volksliteratur (= Beiträge zur Sprach- und Kulturgeschichte des Orients, Band 28). Verlag für Orientkunde, Walldorf 1978, ISBN 978-3-936687-28-6.
- Staat und Glaubensgemeinschaft im Islam. Bd. 1: Von den Anfängen bis ins 13. Jahrhundert, ISBN 3-7608-4529-X; Bd. 2: Vom Spätmittelalter bis zur Neuzeit, Artemis, Zürich 1981, ISBN 978-3-7608-4531-9.
- Der Koran. Einführung, Texte, Erläuterungen. Beck, München 1983; 4., 2002, ISBN 978-3-406-43886-8.
- Die Festung des Glaubens. Triumph und Scheitern des islamischen Rationalismus im 11. Jh. Beck, München 1988, ISBN 978-3-406-33280-7.
- Timur der Eroberer und die islamische Welt des späten Mittelalters. Beck, München 1993, ISBN 978-3-406-37171-4.
- Geschichte der islamischen Theologie. Beck, München 1994, ISBN 978-3-406-37981-9.
- Die islamische Welt bis 1500. München 1998 (= Oldenbourg Grundriss der Geschichte, Band 24), ISBN 978-3-486-53011-7.
- Das islamische Recht. Eine Einführung, WVA-Verlag, Westhofen 2001, ISBN 978-3-936136-00-5.
- Islam – Die Heilsbotschaft des Korans und ihre Konsequenzen, WVA-Verlag, Westhofen 2001, ISBN 978-3-936136-01-2.
- Im Offenkundigen das Verborgene. Die Heilszusage des sunnitischen Islams, Vandenhoeck & Ruprecht, Göttingen 2002.
- Allahs Liebling. Ursprung und Erscheinungsformen des Mohammedglaubens, Oldenbourg, München 2008, ISBN 978-3-486-58535-3.
- Mohammed – Leben und Legende, Oldenbourg-Verlag, München 2008, ISBN 978-3-486-58534-6.
- Mohammed – 20 Kapitel über den Propheten der Muslime, München 2010, ISBN 978-3-486-59705-9.
- (Hg.) Der Koran und sein religiöses und kulturelles Umfeld (= Schriften des Historischen Kollegs. Kolloquien. Bd. 72), München 2010, ISBN 978-3-486-59052-4 (Digitalisat).
- Angst vor Allah? Auseinandersetzungen mit dem Islam, Duncker & Humblot, Berlin 2014, ISBN 978-3-428-14373-3.
- Was ist der Islam? Grundzüge einer Weltreligion, Duncker & Humblot, Berlin 2018, ISBN 978-3-428-15228-5.
- Die erdrückende Last des ewig Gültigen. Der sunnitische Islam in dreißig Porträtskizzen, 2 Teilbände, Bd. I: Erster und Zweiter Teil; Bd. II: Dritter und Vierter Teil, Berlin 2018.
