= Buyid dynasty =

Shia dynasty in Iran and Iraq (934–1062)

Buyid dynasty آل بویه Âl-i Būya
- 934–1062
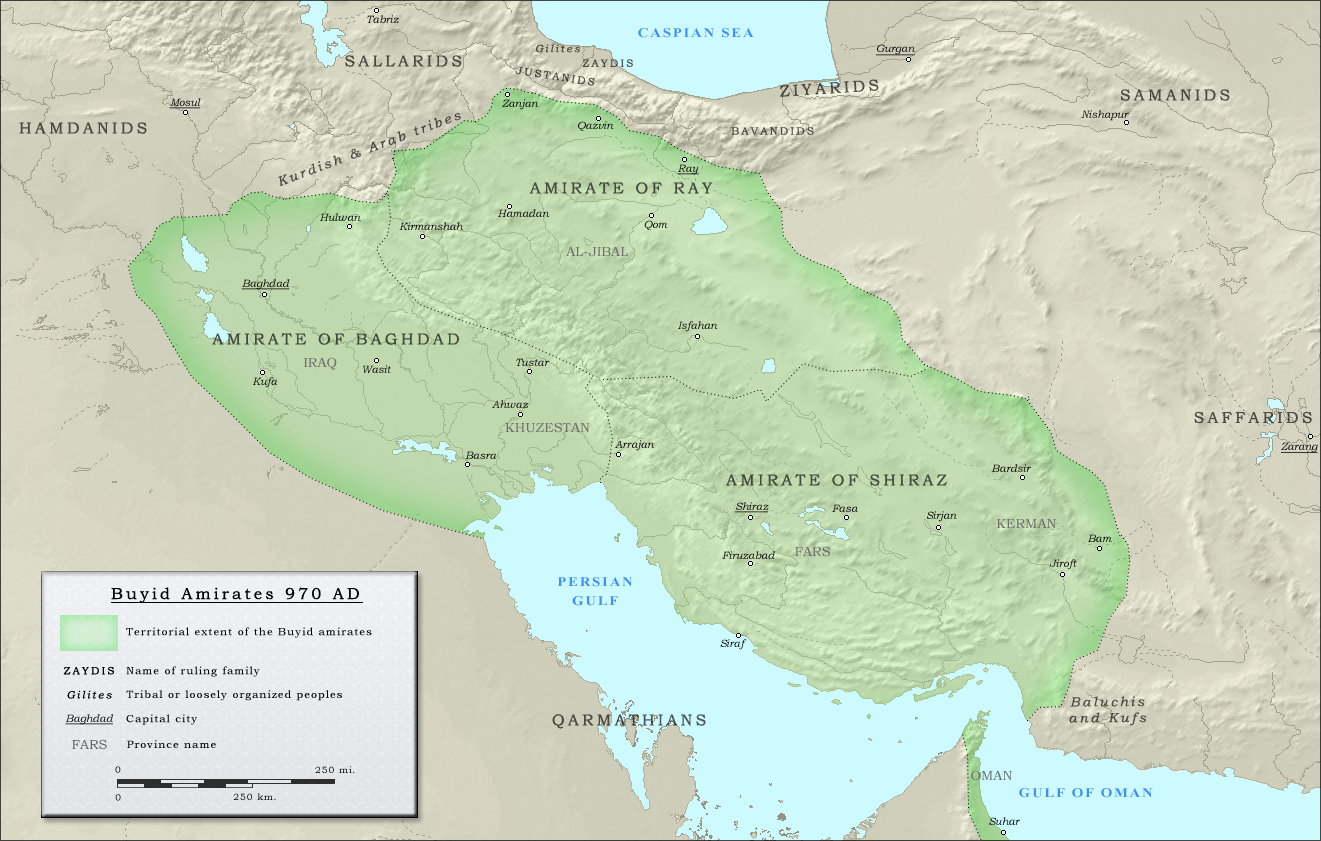
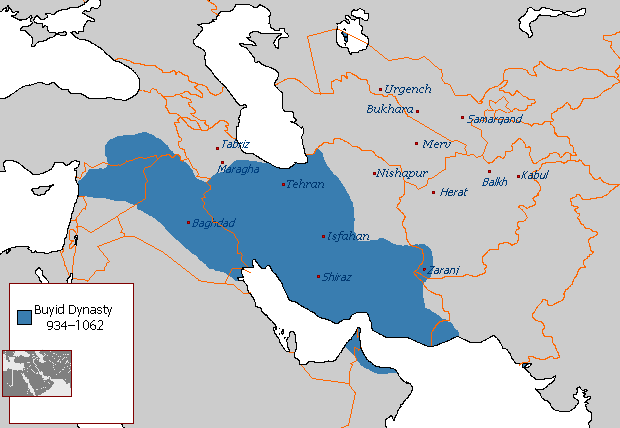
- Capital: Shiraz (Buyids of Fars, 934–1062); Ray (Buyids of Jibal, 943–1029); Baghdad (Buyids of Iraq, 945–1055)
- Common languages: Arabic (official and court language; lingua franca); Middle Persian (secondary court language); New Persian (popular, literature); Daylami (ruling dynasty)
- Religion: Shia Islam (dynasty); Sunni Islam (majority); Zoroastrianism; Christianity; Judaism
- Government: Hereditary monarchy
- Emir, Shahanshah
  - 934–949: Imad al-Dawla
  - 1048–1062: Abu Mansur Fulad Sutun
- Historical era: Middle Ages; Islamic Golden Age; Iranian Intermezzo
  - Established: 934
  - Imad al-Dawla proclaimed himself Emir: 934
  - Adud al-Dawla becomes the supreme ruler of the Buyid dynasty: 979
  - Ghaznavid invasion: 1029
  - Disestablished: 1062

Area
- 980 est.: 1,600,000 km^{2} (620,000 sq mi)
- Currency: dirham, dinar
Preceded by
Abbasid Caliphate
Ziyarids
Banu Ilyas
Abu Abdallah al-Baridi
Succeeded by
Ghaznavids
Seljuk Empire
Kakuyids
Uqaylid dynasty
Marwanids
Shabankara
Banu Mazyad
Annazids

The Buyid dynasty (Note: Persian: آل بویه, romanized: Âl-i Būya) (Note: Also spelled as Bowayhids, Buwaihids or Buwayhids etc. Arabic: البويهية, romanized: al-Buwayhiyyah) or Buyid Empire was a Zaydi and later Twelver Shi'a dynasty of Daylamite origin. (Note: Historiography and scholarship agree that the Buyids were Daylamites.) Founded by Imad al-Dawla, they mainly ruled over central and southern Iran, and Iraq from 934 to 1062. The Buyids, together with the rise of other Iranian dynasties in the region, represents a period in Iranian history sometimes referred to as the Iranian Intermezzo.

The Buyid dynasty was founded by Ali ibn Buya, who in 934 conquered Fars and made Shiraz his capital. He received the laqab or honorific title of Imad al-Dawla (lit. 'Fortifier of the State'). His younger brother, Hasan ibn Buya (r. 935–976) conquered parts of Jibal in the late 930s, and by 943 managed to capture Ray, which he made his capital. Hasan was given the laqab of Rukn al-Dawla (lit. 'Pillar of the State'). In 945, the youngest brother, Ahmad ibn Buya, conquered Iraq and made Baghdad his capital. He was given the laqab, Mu'izz al-Dawla.

As Iranians of Daylamite origin, the Buyids consciously revived the symbols and practices of the Sasanian Empire. Beginning with Imad al-Dawla, some of the Buyid rulers used the ancient Sasanian title of Shahanshah, literally "king of kings". The Buyids had many inscriptions carved into the Achaemenid ruins at Persepolis, thus suggesting a form of veneration of the site, which the Buyids thought was built by the mythical Iranian king Jamshid.

The Buyid dynasty reached its zenith under Fanna Khusraw (r. 949–983), whose laqab was Adud al-Dawla. He is remembered for his open-mindedness and building projects such as the Band-e Amir dam near Shiraz. Under him, the Buyid realm stretched from the Byzantine border in Syria in the west to the borders of Khorasan in the east.

Although the Buyids were initially Zaydi Shi'a, they became Twelver Shi'a following the Major Occultation of Muhammad al-Mahdi after the death of his fourth agent in 941. Regardless, the Buyids were known for supporting the Sunni Abbasid caliphs and being tolerant of the Sunni population, who were the majority in their realm. They were, by contrast, unfriendly towards the Fatimids, centered in Egypt, who were Isma'ilis.

In contrast to the Samanids, who ruled over a mostly Sunni Muslim population in Central Asia, the Buyid realm contained many Zoroastrians and Christians (primarily from the Church of the East). Because of this, many records written under the Buyids were composed in Middle Persian, Syriac and Arabic.

== Etymology ==
The etymology of the name Būya (Būyāk in Middle Persian) is defined by the Dehkhoda Dictionary as something that is "pleasant-smelling" or "aromatic". The Amid Dictionary lists the word Būya as equivalent to New Persian ārzū, also meaning "aromatic", as well as "hope", "desire", and "wish". This name was given to Abu Shoja Buya, the eponymous ancestor of the Buyid dynasty.

== Origins ==
The Buyids were descendants of Panah-Khusrow, a Zoroastrian from Daylam. He had a son named Buya, who was a fisherman from Lahijan, and later left Zoroastrianism and converted to Islam. Buya later had three sons, named Ahmad, 'Ali, and Hasan, who would later carve out the Buyid kingdom together. The Buyids claimed royal lineage from Bahram V (r. 420–438), the King of Kings (shahanshah) of the Sasanian Empire. The Buyids belonged to the clan of "Shīrdil Awandān".

== History ==
=== Rise (934–945) ===
The founder of the dynasty, 'Ali ibn Buya, was originally a soldier in the service of the Daylamite warlord Makan ibn Kaki, but later changed his allegiance to the Iranian ruler Mardavij, who had established the Ziyarid dynasty, and was himself related to the ruling dynasty of Gilan, a region bordering Daylam. 'Ali was later joined by his two younger brothers, Hasan ibn Buya and Ahmad ibn Buya. In 932, 'Ali was given Karaj as his fief, and thus was able to enlist other Daylamites into his army. However, 'Ali's initiative proved too much for Mardavij, who planned to have him killed, but 'Ali was informed of Mardavij's plan by the latter's own vizier. The brothers, with 400 of their Daylamite supporters, then fled to Fars, where they managed to take control of Arrajan. However, the Buyids and the Abbasid general Yaqut shortly fought for control of Fars, with the Buyids eventually emerging victorious. This victory opened the way for the conquest of the capital of Fars, Shiraz.

'Ali also allied with the landowners of Fars, which included the Fasanjas family, which would later produce many prominent statesmen for the Buyids. 'Ali also enlisted more soldiers — including Turks, who were made part of the cavalry. 'Ali then sent his brother Ahmad on an expedition to Kerman, but was forced to withdraw after opposition from the Baloch and the Qafs. However, Mardavij, who sought to depose the Abbasid caliph of Baghdad and recreate a Zoroastrian Iranian Empire, shortly wrested Khuzestan from the Abbasids and forced 'Ali to recognize him as his suzerain.

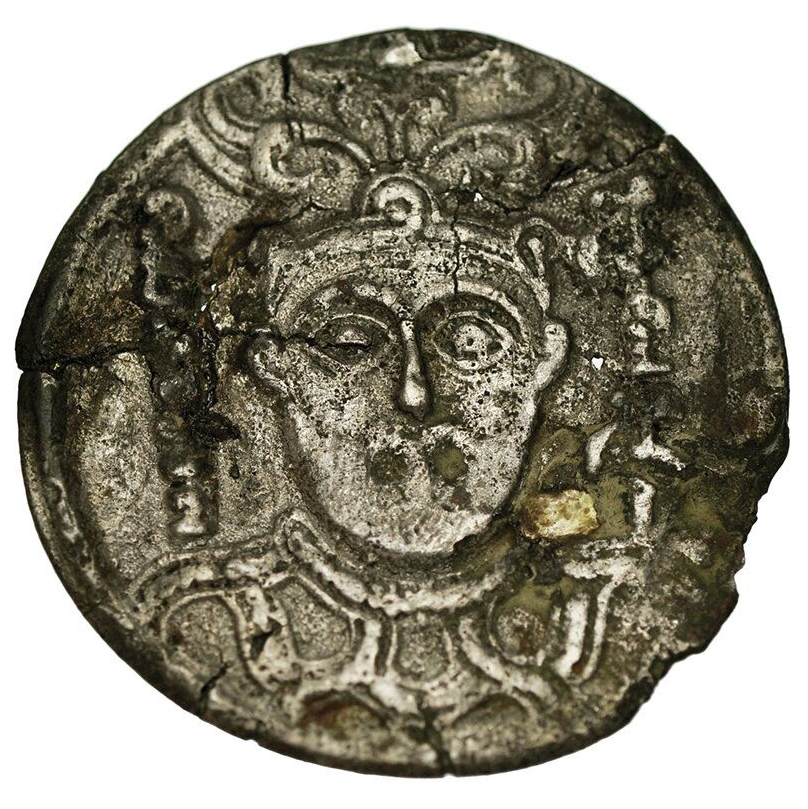
Portrait of Rukn al-Dawla (949-977), Al-Muhammadiya mint, dated 962-3

Luckily for the Buyids, Mardavij was assassinated shortly thereafter in 935, which caused chaos in the Ziyarid territories, a perfect situation for the Buyid brothers; Ali and Ahmad conquered Khuzistan, while Hasan captured the Ziyarid capital of Isfahan, and, in 943, captured Ray, which became his capital, thus conquering all of Jibal. In 945, Ahmad entered Iraq and seized control of Baghdad, leaving the Abbasid court with no real option but to submit to their authority as de facto rulers. He received the laqab Mu'izz ad-Dawla ("Fortifier of the State"), while 'Ali was given the laqab Imād al-Dawla ("Support of the State"), and Hasan was given the laqab Rukn al-Dawla ("Pillar of the State"). The Buyids constructed a royal palace (Dar al-Mamlaka) in Baghdad, situated just north of the caliphal palace (Dar al-Khilafa), symbolizing a division of authority. Meanwhile, the caliph's influence continued to decline — he no longer had a vizier and effectively became a figurehead under Buyid control.

=== Height of power and Golden age (945–983) ===
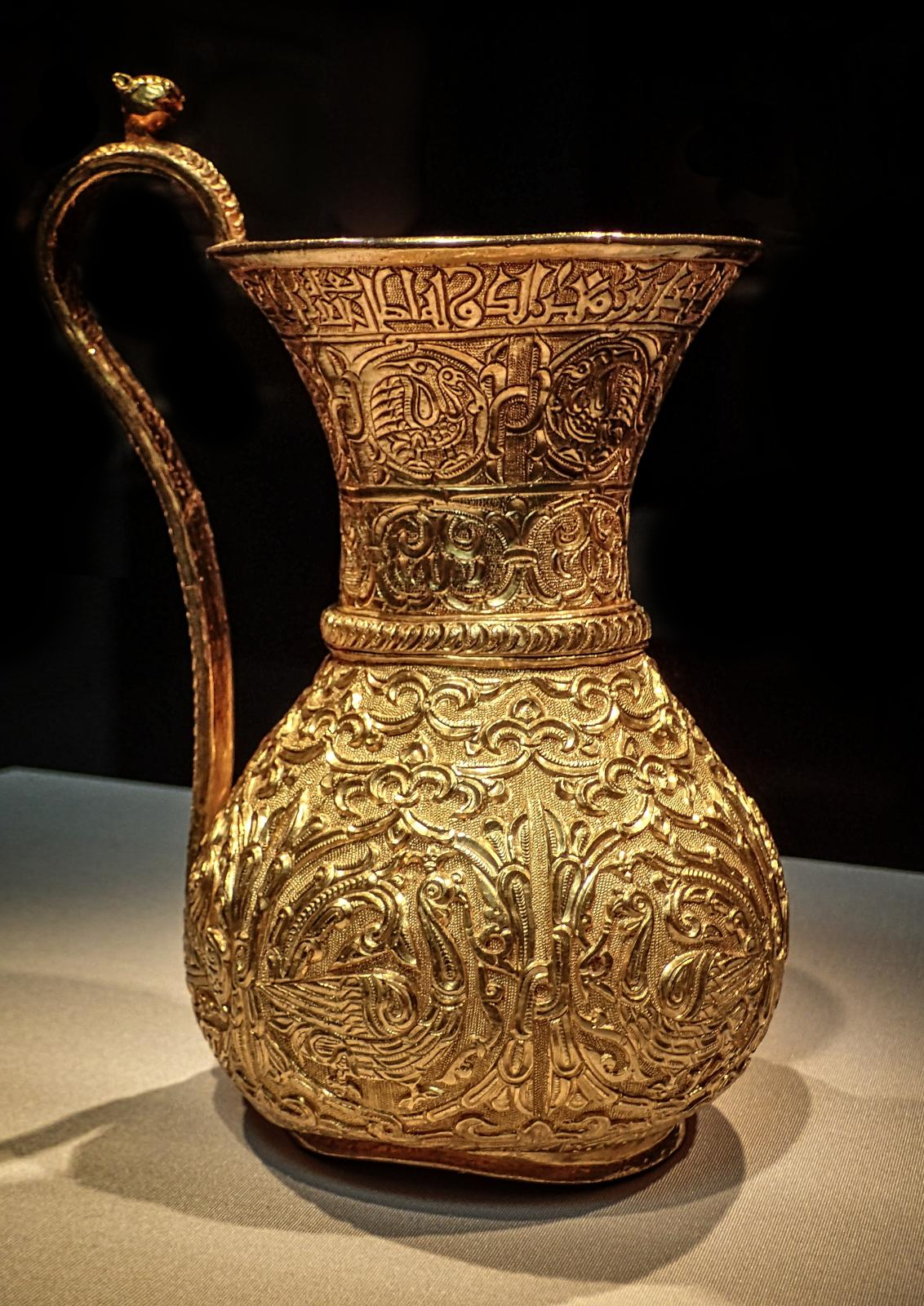
Gold ewer of the Buyid Period, mentioning Buyid ruler Izz al-Dawla Bakhtiyar ibn Mu'izz al-Dawla, 966–977 CE, Iran

In addition to the other territories the Buyids had conquered, Kerman was conquered in 967, followed by Oman (967), the Jazira (979), Tabaristan (980), and Gorgan (981). After this, however, the Buyids went into a slow decline, with pieces of the confederation gradually breaking off and local dynasties under their rule becoming de facto independent.

=== Decline and fall (983–1062) ===
The death of Adud al-Dawla is considered the start of the decline of the Buyid dynasty; his son Abu Kalijar Marzuban, who was in Baghdad when he died, at first kept his death secret to ensure his succession and avoid civil war. When he eventually made the death of his father public, he was given the title of "Samsam al-Dawla". However, Adud's other son, Shirdil Abu'l-Fawaris, challenged his authority, and the feared civil war occurred anyway. Meanwhile, a Kurdish Marwanid chieftain named Badh ibn Dustak seized Diyabakr and forced Samsam al-Dawla to recognize him as the vassal ruler of the region. Furthermore, Mu'ayyad al-Dawla, son of and successor to Rukn al-Dawla, also died during this period. Mu'ayyad al-Dawla was succeeded by his brother Fakhr al-Dawla, who, with the aid of Mu'ayyad al-Dawla's vizier Sahib ibn 'Abbad, became the ruler of Mu'ayyad al-Dawla's possessions. Another son of Adud al-Dawla, Abu Tahir Firuzshah, established himself as the ruler of Basra and took the title of "Diya' al-Dawla", while another son, Abu'l-Husain Ahmad, established himself as the ruler of Khuzistan, taking the title of "Taj al-Dawla".

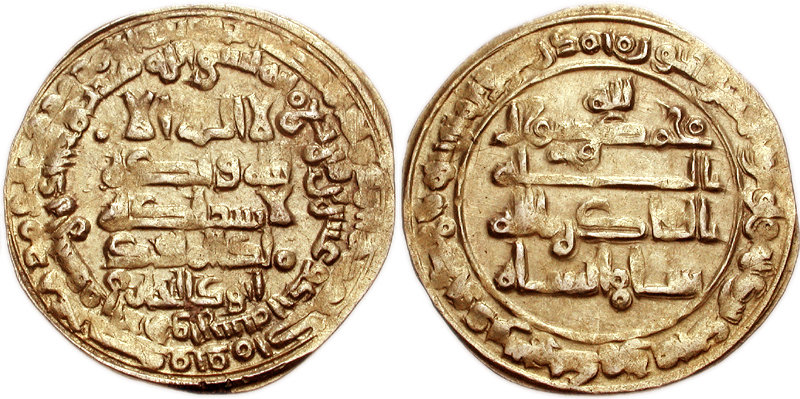
Coinage of Buyid amir Abu Kalijar (r.1024–1048)

Shirdil Abu'l-Fawaris (known by his title of "Sharaf al-Dawla") quickly seized Oman from Samsam al-Dawla, and, in 983, the Turkic troops of Samsam al-Dawla mutinied against him and some left Iraq for Fars, but most of them were persuaded by his relative Ziyar ibn Shahrakawayh to stay in Iraq. However, Iraq was in a grim state, and several rebellions occurred, which he managed to suppress, the most dangerous being that of Asfar ibn Kurdawayh, who tried to make Abu Nasr Firuz Kharshadh (known by his title of "Baha' al-Dawla") the ruler of Iraq. During the same period, Samsam al-Dawla also managed to seize Basra and Khuzistan, forcing his two brothers to flee to Fakhr al-Dawla's territory.

During the mid-11th century, the Buyid amirates gradually fell to the Ghaznavids and Seljuk Turks. In 1029, Majd al-Dawla, who was facing an uprising by his Daylami troops in Ray, requested assistance from Mahmud of Ghazna. When Sultan Mahmud arrived, he deposed Majd al-Dawla, replaced him with a Ghaznavid governor and ended the Buyid dynasty in Ray.

In 1055, Tughril occupied Baghdad, the seat of the caliphate, and ousted the last of the Buyid rulers. Like the Buyids, the Seljuks kept the Abbasid caliphs as figureheads.

== Government ==
The Buyids established a confederation in Iraq and western Iran. This confederation formed three principalities: one in Fars, with Shiraz as its capital, the second one in Jibal, with Ray as its capital, and the last one in Iraq, with Baghdad as its capital. However, during their late period, more principalities formed in the Buyid confederation. Succession was hereditary, with rulers dividing their land among their sons.

The title used by the Buyid rulers was amir, meaning "governor" or "prince". Generally, one of the amirs would be recognized as having seniority over the others; this individual would use the title of amir al-umara, or senior amir. Although the senior amīr was the formal head of the Būyids, he did not usually have any significant control outside of his amirate; each amir enjoyed a high degree of autonomy within his territories. As mentioned above, some stronger amirs used the Sassanid title of Shahanshah. Furthermore, several other titles such as malik ("king"), and malik al-muluk ("king of kings"), were also used by the Buyids. On a smaller scale, the Buyid territory was also ruled by princes from other families, such as the Hasanwayhids.

=== Military ===
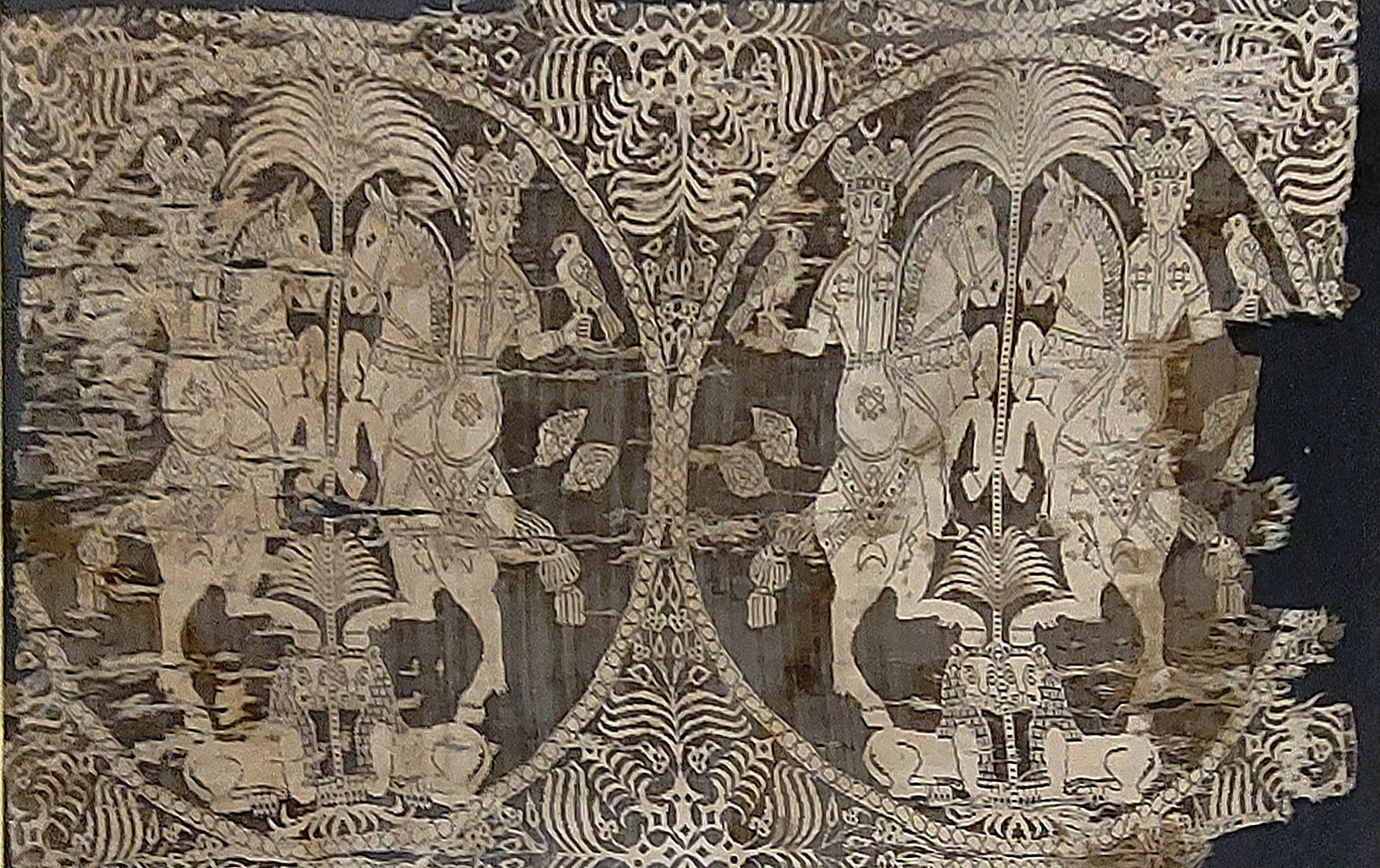
Silk with depiction of horsemen, produced under the Buyids

During the beginning of the Buyid dynasty, their army consisted mainly of their fellow Daylamites, a warlike and brave people of mostly peasant origin, who served as foot soldiers. The Daylamites had a long history of military activity dating back to the Sasanian period, and had been mercenaries in various places in Iran and Iraq, and even as far as Egypt. The Daylamites, during a battle, normally bore a sword, a shield, and three spears. Furthermore, they were also known for their formidable shield formation, which was hard to break through.

However, when the Buyid territories increased, they began recruiting Turks into their cavalry, who had played a prominent role in the Abbasid military. The Buyid army also consisted of Kurds, who, along with the Turks, were Sunnis, while the Daylamites were Shi'i Muslims. However, the army of the Buyids of Jibal was mainly composed of Daylamites.

The Daylamites and Turks often quarrelled with each other for dominance within the army. To compensate their soldiers, the Buyid amīrs often distributed iqtāʾs, or the rights to a percentage of tax revenues from a province (tax farming), although the practice of payment in kind was also frequently used. While the Turks were favoured in Buyid Iraq, the Daylamites were favoured in Buyid Iran.

== Culture ==
=== Language ===
Contrary to the Samanids, the Buyids did not adopt Dari (also known as New Persian) as their official language. Instead, Arabic served as the lingua franca of their realm, while Middle Persian was occasionally used as a secondary court language.

Buyids were notable as patrons of Arabic language and culture, and used Arabic in correspondence as well as poetry. Under the Buyids, Arabic culture experienced a remarkable flourishing, and the Dailami rulers who succeeded the founding brothers — the sons of Buya — readily and enthusiastically embraced this culture. Adud al-Dawla, Shāhanshāh of the Buyid dynasty, patronized the writing of the Kitab al-Taji, a history of the Buyid dynasty written in Arabic by Abu Ishaq Ibrahim al-Sabi. One notable example of Buyid patronage of Arabic literature is the well-known account of al-Mutanabbī — a great Arabic poet — being warmly received at the court of ʿAḍud al-Dawla in Shiraz. Abu al-Faraj al-Isfahani, an Arab historian, was primarily patronized by the Buyids, though his magnum opus, Kitab al-Aghani, was sponsored by an anonymous patron.

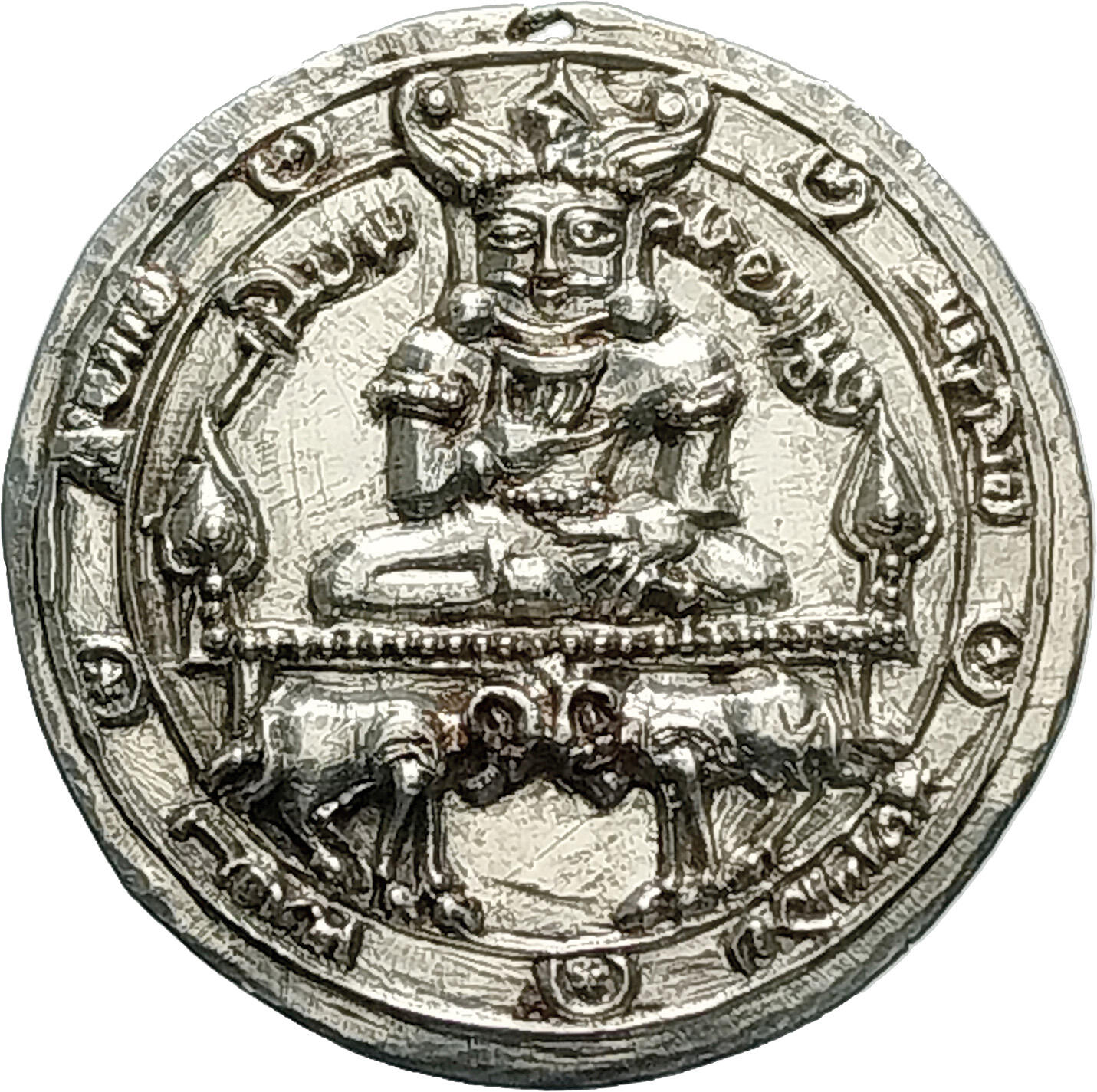
Silver medallion of Adud al-Dawla (949–983) with Middle Persian legends

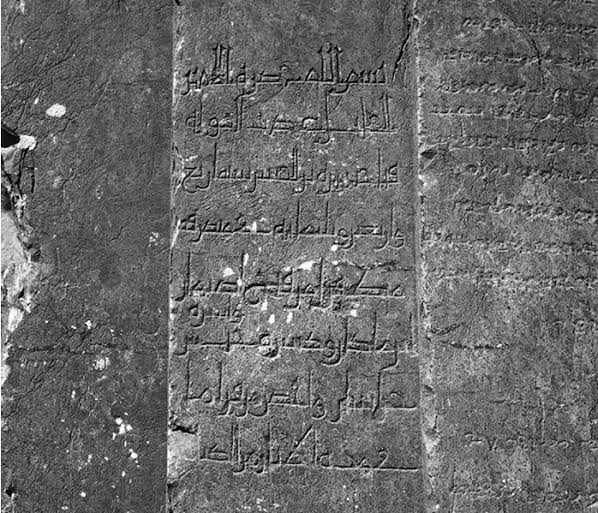
One of the two Arabic inscriptions of Adud al-Dawla in Persepolis.

It is uncertain why the Buyids did not promote the use of New Persian. According to the historians Edmund Herzig and Sarah Stewart in their book Early Islamic Iran (2011), it may have been due to three factors; the Buyids had been influenced during their stay in Baghdad and thus aspired to be important supporters of Arabic writing; New Persian may have been discouraged by the Zoroastrian priests, who still wrote in Middle Persian in regions such as Fars; New Persian may have been very different/at odds with the dialects of western Iran, and was only mostly welcomed in eastern Iran.

However, New Persian was still used as language of poetry at the Buyid courts. Many prominent poets in the Buyid realm wrote in New Persian, such as Abu Muhammad Mansur ibn Ali al-Mantiqi al-Razi, Khusrawi Sarakhsi and Abu Zayd Muhammad ibn Ali al-Ghada'iri al-Razi. The Persian vizier Sahib ibn Abbad (died 995), who was the leading figure at the Buyid court at Ray for a lengthy period, wrote only in Arabic, which he preferred instead of his native tongue. However, he also accepted New Persian panegyrics that were dedicated to him.

The Buyids also promoted the use of fahlaviyat, a designation for poetry composed in the local northwestern Iranian dialects and languages. Due to having a large Zoroastrian and Christian population, many records written under the Buyids were composed in Middle Persian, Syriac and Arabic.

=== Naming traditions, celebrations and identity ===
While the brothers that established the Buyid kingdom had the Arabic names of Ali, Hasan, and Ahmad, the second Buyid generation notably had Iranian names, such as Kamrava, Marzuban, Bahram and Khusraw. The Buyids had many inscriptions carved at the Achaemenid ruins of Persepolis, thus suggesting a form of veneration of the site, which the Buyids thought was built by the mythical Iranian king Jamshid. Adud al-Dawla celebrated the ancient Iranian festivals of Sadeh and Mehregan, and like many previous Islamic rulers — including the caliphs — he most likely celebrated Nowruz as well. He used Nowruz as a model for two newly created festivals, which were celebrated annually in the town of Fana Khusraw-gird.

Under the Buyids, the idea of "Iranshahr" (Iran) appears in geographical works, which were all written in Arabic by mostly Iranian authors. The geographer Istakhri, who was active in the late 10th-century and wrote; "The best cultivated (ma'mur), fairest and most fertile part of the world, and the most established in its political life is the kingdom of Iranshahr."

Herzig and Stewart adds that;

Considered together the preceding materials offer important clues to the question of Iranian identity under the Buyids. In the first instance we have rulers who are unashamedly Iranian and who sought by genealogy, title and homage to Persepolis to show their connection with the pre-Islamic Iranian past. At the same time, the inhabitants of the Buyid kingdoms and eastern Iranians showed a sometimes embarrassingly high level of self-esteem as the people of Iranshahr.

=== Religion ===
The Buyids were originally Zaydi Shi'is, but their rise to power in the tenth century proved particularly favorable to the development of Twelver Shi'ism. After establishing their authority in Baghdad, the Buyids cultivated the support of the Twelver Shi'a community and supported the articulation of a distinctive Twelver identity, including their patronage of Twelver scholars. The Sunni Abbasids retained the caliphate but were deprived of all secular power.

In 962 Buyid amir Mu'izz al-Dawla ordered curses against the first three caliphs painted on the walls in the mosques of Baghdad, which were later blotted out by opponents of the Shias. During Rukn al-Dawla's reign, the khutba continued to be read in the caliph's name despite opposition from Shi'a Muslims, who refused to participate in Friday services. He also continued to recognize the caliphate by minting the caliph's name on his coins. Rukn al-Dawla permitted considerable latitude in Shi'a religious affairs, which Busse links to Qom's emergence as an important center of Shi'a theology.

During Buyid rule, the shrines of the seventh and ninth Imams at Kadhimiya underwent extensive construction and renovation. They also built the Jurjir mosque in Isfahan. In 960, the Buyids constructed the Friday Mosque in Na'in. (Note: Jonathan Bloom states the Buyids restored the Friday mosques of Isfahan and Na'in.)

== Architecture ==
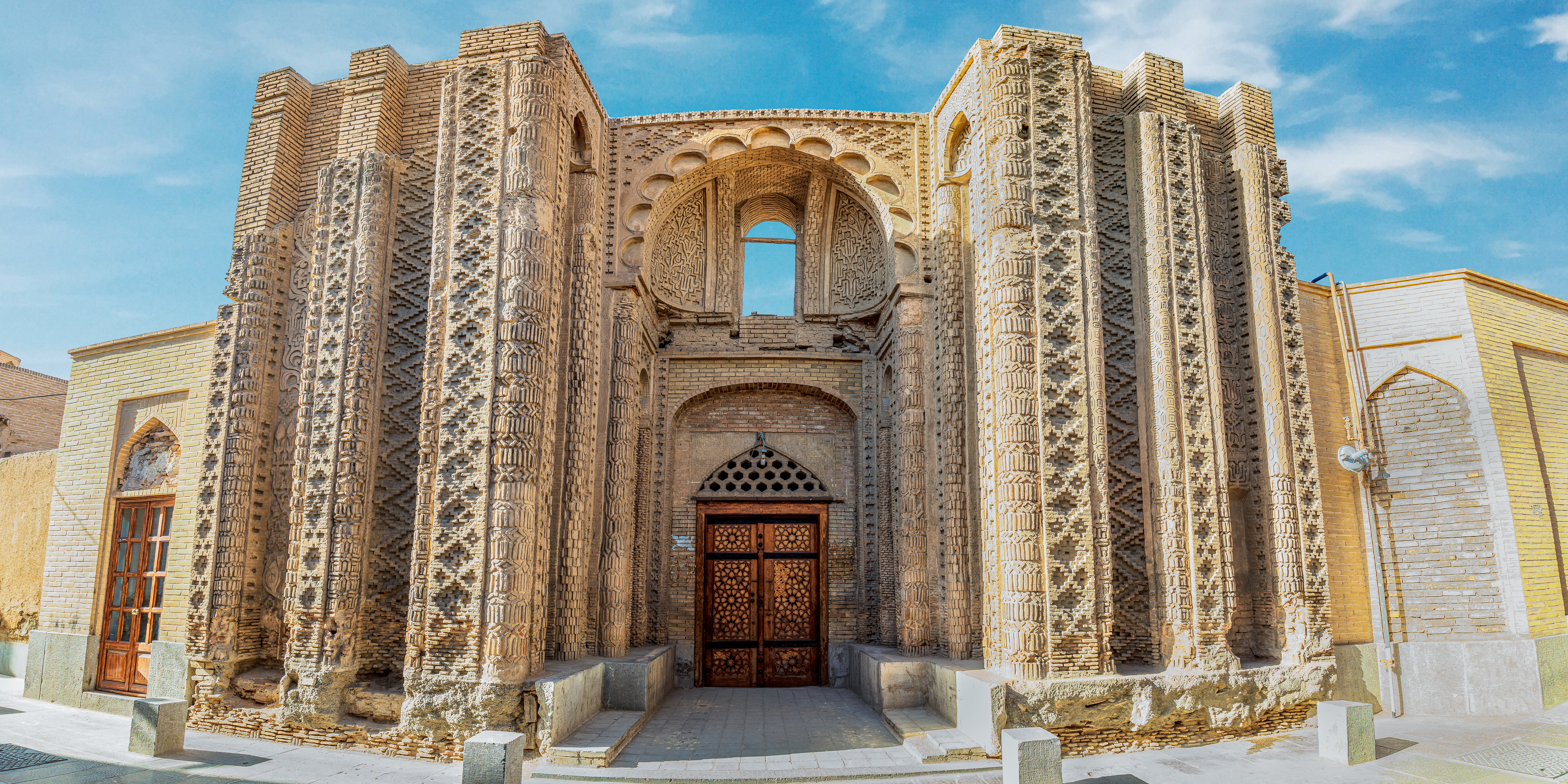
The Jorjir Mosque in Isfahan was built by the Buyids circa 1000.

Under the supervision of the Buyids, large construction and engineering projects took place, such as irrigation systems and agricultural developments, all of which led to an increase in income. In comparison to other local rulers in Iraq, particularly the Baridis and Hamdanids, it was clear that the Buyids had a liking to construction projects. When Mu'izz al-Dawla arrived in Iraq, the country had been ravaged as a result of local struggles over control of Baghdad. Under his instructions, the Baduriya dam on the Rufayl river was restored, subsequently resulting in lower prices of common foods, such as bread. This also inspired people to migrate to Baghdad.

During the reign of Adud al-Dawla the Buyid palaces in east Baghdad were started. Under him, Shiraz became so crowded that the garrison had no place to roam, which led Adud al-Dawla to have a special quarter created, Fana Khusraw-gird ("Fana Khusraw made it"), a name which deliberately reflected the name of towns established by the Sasanian kings. The town of Firuzabad, considered to be linked to the Sasanian king Ardashir I (r. 224–242), was revamped by Adud al-Dawla, possibly done in order to stress his claim to Sasanian ancestry. One of Adud al-Dawla's lasting building projects was the mausoleum erected on the burial place of Ali. Adud ad-Dawlah constructed a hospital on the ruins of the Khuld Palace in west Baghdad.

== Buyid rulers ==
=== Major rulers ===
Generally, the three most powerful Buyid amirs at any given time were those controlling Fars, Jibal and Iraq. Sometimes a ruler would come to rule more than one region, but no Buyid rulers ever exercised direct control of all three regions.

Buyids in Fars

- Imad al-Dawla (934–949)
- 'Adud al-Dawla (949–983)
- Sharaf al-Dawla (983–989)
- Samsam al-Dawla (989–998)
- Baha' al-Dawla (998–1012)
- Sultan al-Dawla (1012–1024)
- Abu Kalijar (1024–1048)
- Abu Mansur Fulad Sutun (1048–1051)
- Abu Sa'd Khusrau Shah (1051–1054)
- Abu Mansur Fulad Sutun (1051–1062)

Buyids in Ray

- Rukn al-Dawla (935–976)
- Fakhr al-Dawla (976–980)
- Mu'ayyad al-Dawla (980–983)
- Fakhr al-Dawla (restored; 984–997)
- Majd al-Dawla (997–1029)

Buyids in Iraq

- Mu'izz al-Dawla (945–967)
- 'Izz al-Dawla (966–978)
- 'Adud al-Dawla (978–983)
- Samsam al-Dawla (983–987)
- Sharaf al-Dawla (987–989)
- Baha' al-Dawla (989–1012)
- Sultan al-Dawla (1012–1021)
- Musharrif al-Dawla (1021–1025)
- Jalal al-Dawla (1025–1044)
- Abu Kalijar (1044–1048)
- Al-Malik al-Rahim (1048–1055)

=== Minor rulers ===
It was not uncommon for younger sons to found collateral lines, or for individual Buyid members to take control of a province and begin ruling there. The following list is incomplete.

Buyids in Basra

- Diya' al-Dawla (980s)

Buyids in Hamadan

- Mu'ayyad al-Dawla (976–983)
- Shams al-Dawla (997–1021)
- Sama' al-Dawla (1021–1024)

Buyids in Kerman

- Qawam al-Dawla (1012–1028)

Buyids of Khuzistan

- Taj al-Dawla (980s)

== Family tree ==
Buya
Imad al-Dawla; 934–949	Rukn al-Dawla; 935–976	Mu'izz al-Dawla; 945–967	Kama
Abu Ishaq Ibrahim	Izz al-Dawla; 967–978	Sanad al-Dawla	Marzuban	Zubayda	Abu Tahir	Ali ibn Kama
Marzuban ibn Bakhtiyar	Salar	Unnamed princess
Fakhr al-Dawla; 976–997	'Adud al-Dawla; 949–983	Mu'ayyad al-Dawla; 980–983
Shams al-Dawla; 997–1021	Majd al-Dawla; 997–1029	Sharaf al-Dawla; 983–989	Samsam al-Dawla; 983–998	Baha' al-Dawla; 998–1012	Shahnaz
Sama' al-Dawla; 1021–1024	Qawam al-Dawla; 1012–1028	Sultan al-Dawla; 1012–1024	Musharrif al-Dawla; 1021–1025	Jalal al-Dawla; 1027–1044
Fana-Khusrau	Abu Dulaf
Abu Kalijar; 1024–1048	Al-Malik al-Aziz	Abu Mansur Ali
Abu Ali Fana-Khusrau	Abu Mansur Fulad Sutun; 1048–1062	Al-Malik al-Rahim; 1048–1055	Kamrava	Abu'l-Muzaffar Bahram	Abu Sa'd Khusrau Shah
Abu'l-Ghana'im al-Marzuban	Surkhab

== See also ==
- Iranian Intermezzo
- List of kings of Persia
- List of Shi'a Muslims dynasties

== Sources ==
- Afsaruddin, Asma (2018). "Alternative Patterns of Legitimacy: Sunni-Shi'i Debates on Political Leadership". In Salvatore, Armando (ed.). The Wiley Blackwell History of Islam. John Wiley & Sons Ltd.
- Baker, Christine D. (2016). "The lost origins of the Daylamites: the construction of a new ethnic legacy for the Buyid". In Kennedy, Rebecca Futo; Jones-Lewis, Molly (eds.). The Routledge Handbook of Identity and the Environment in the Classical and Medieval Worlds. p. 281-296. ISBN 9781317415701.
- Berkey, Jonathan (2003). The Formation of Islam: Religion and Society in the Near East, 600–1800. Cambridge University Press. ISBN 978-0-521-58813-3.
- Blair, Sheila (1992). The Monumental Inscriptions from Early Islamic Iran and Transoxiana. Brill. pp. 1–307. ISBN 9789004093676.
- Blair, Sheila S. (2009). "Būyid art and architecture". In Fleet, Kate; Krämer, Gudrun; Matringe, Denis; Nawas, John; Rowson, Everett (eds.). Encyclopaedia of Islam (3rd ed.). Brill Online. ISSN 1873-9830.
- Bloom, Jonathan M. (2004). "Facts and Fantasy in Buyid Art". Oriente Moderno, Nuova serie. 23 (84) (2): 387–400.
- Bloom, Jonathan M.; Blair, Sheila, eds. (2009). "Isfahan". Grove Encyclopedia of Islamic Art & Architecture. Vol. 2: Delhi-Mosque. Oxford University Press. ISBN 978-0-19-530991-1.
- Bonner, Jay (2017). Islamic Geometric Patterns: Their Historical Development and Traditional Methods of Construction. Springer. ISBN 9781441902177.
- Bosworth, C. E. (1963). The Ghaznavids: Their Empire in Afghanistan and Eastern Iran, 994 : 1040. Edinburgh University Press. pp. 1–331.
- Bosworth, C. E. (1968). "The Political and Dynastic History of the Iranian World (A.D. 1000–1217)". In Boyle, John Andrew (ed.). The Cambridge History of Iran: The Saljuq and Mongol Periods. Vol. 5. Cambridge: Cambridge University Press. pp. 1–203. ISBN 0-521-06936-X.
- Bosworth, Clifford Edmund (1976). The Mediaeval Islamic Underworld: The Banū Sāsān in Arabic Society and Literature. E.J. Brill. ISBN 9789004659445.
- Bosworth, C.E. (1996). The New Islamic Dynasties: A Chronological and Genealogical Manual. New York City: Columbia University Press. ISBN 0-231-10714-5.
- Browne, Edward Granville (2002). Islamic Medicine. Cambridge University Press. ISBN 81-87570-19-9.
- Bürgel, Ch.; Mottahedeh, R. (1988). "ʿAżod-al-dawla, Abū Šojāʿ Fannā Ḵosrow". In Yarshater, Ehsan (ed.). Encyclopædia Iranica. Vol. III/3: Azerbaijan IV–Bačča(-ye) Saqqā. London and New York: Routledge & Kegan Paul. pp. 265–269. ISBN 978-0-71009-115-4.
- Busse, Heribert (1975). "Iran Under the Buyids". In Frye, Richard N. (ed.). The Cambridge History of Iran: From the Arab Invasion to the Saljuqs. Vol. 4. Cambridge: Cambridge University Press. pp. 250–305. ISBN 0-521-20093-8.
- Cahen, Cl. (1960). "Buwayhids or Būyids". In Gibb, H. A. R.; Kramers, J. H.; Lévi-Provençal, E.; Schacht, J.; Lewis, B. & Pellat, Ch. (eds.). The Encyclopaedia of Islam, Second Edition. Volume I: A–B. Leiden: E. J. Brill. pp. 1350–1357. OCLC 495469456.
- Clawson, Patrick; Rubin, Michael (2005). Eternal Iran: Continuity and Chaos. Springer. ISBN 978-1-4039-6276-8.
- Davaran, Fereshteh (2010). Continuity in Iranian Identity: Resilience of a Cultural Heritage. Routledge. ISBN 978-1138780149.
- Donohue, John J. (2003). The Buwayhid Dynasty in Iraq 334 H./945 to 403 H./1012: Shaping Institutions for the Future. Leiden and Boston: Brill. ISBN 90-04-12860-3.
- El-Hibri, Tayeb (2021). The Abbasid Caliphate: A History. Cambridge University Press.
- Felix, Wolfgang; Madelung, Wilferd (1995). "Deylamites". In Yarshater, Ehsan (ed.). Encyclopædia Iranica. Vol. VII/4: Deylam, John of–Divorce IV. In modern Persia. London and New York: Routledge & Kegan Paul. pp. 342–347. ISBN 978-1-56859-022-6.
- Frye, R.; Keshk, K. (2014). "Būyids". The Oxford Encyclopedia of Islam and Politics (1). Oxford University Press. doi:10.1093/acref:oiso/9780199739356.001.0001. ISBN 978-0-19-973935-6.
- Herzig, Edmund; Stewart, Sarah (2011). Early Islamic Iran. I. B. Tauris. ISBN 978-1780760612.
- Ibn Isfandiyar (1905). An Abridged Translation of the History of Tabaristan. University of Michigan: BRILL. pp. 1–356. "'."
- Kabir, Mafizullah (1964). The Buwayhid Dynasty of Baghdad, 334/946-447/1055. Brill. pp. 1–248.
- Karsh, Efraim (2007). Islamic Imperialism: A History. Yale University Press. pp. 1–284. ISBN 9780300122633.
- Kennedy, Hugh (2004) [1986]. The Prophet and the Age of the Caliphates: The Islamic Near East from the 6th to the 11th Century (Second ed.). Harlow: Longman. ISBN 978-0-582-40525-7.
- Khan, M. S. (1965). "A Manuscript of an Epitome of al-Ṣābī's Kitāb al-Tāǧī". Arabica. 12 (T. 12, Fasc. 1 (Feb.)). Brill: 27–44. doi:10.1163/157005865X00391. JSTOR 4055552.
- Kraemer, Joel L. (1992). Humanism in the Renaissance of Islam: The Cultural Revival During the Buyid Age. BRILL. ISBN 9789004097360.
- Khan, Ruqayya Yasmine (2008). Self and Secrecy in Early Islam. University of South Carolina Press. ISBN 978-1-57003-754-2.
- Le Strange, G. (1899). "Baghdad during the Abbasid Caliphate. A Topographical Summary, with a Notice of the Contemporary Arabic and Persian Authorities". The Journal of the Royal Asiatic Society of Great Britain and Ireland. Oct.: 847–893.
- Lewis, Bernard (1986). "Abbasids". In Gibb, H. A. R.; Kramers, J. H.; Levi-Provençal, E.; Schacht, J. (eds.). The Encyclopaedia of Islam. Vol. I. E.J. Brill. ISBN 90 04 08114 3.
- Lewis, Bernard (1995). The Middle East: A Brief History of the Last 2,000 Years. Scribner. ISBN 0-684-80712-2.
- Madelung, Wilfred (1975). "The Minor Dynasties of Northern Iran". In Frye, Richard N. (ed.). The Cambridge History of Iran: From the Arab Invasion to the Saljuqs. Vol. 4. Cambridge: Cambridge University Press. pp. 198–249. ISBN 0-521-20093-8.
- Momen, Moojan (1985). An Introduction to Shi'i Islam. Yale University Press. ISBN 978-0-300-03531-5.
- Mottahedeh, Roy P. (2023). In the Shadow of the Prophet: Essays in Islamic History. Oneworld Publications. ISBN 9780861545612.
- Nagel, Tilman (1990). "Buyids". In Yarshater, Ehsan (ed.). Encyclopædia Iranica. Vol. IV/6: Burial II–Calendars II. London and New York: Routledge & Kegan Paul. pp. 578–586. ISBN 978-0-71009-129-1.
- Paul, Ludwig (2000). "Persian Language i. Early New Persian". Encyclopædia Iranica.
- Rustow, Marina (2020). The Lost Archive Traces of a Caliphate in a Cairo Synagogue. Princeton University Press.
- Sajjadi, Sadeq; Asatryan, Mushegh; Melvin-Koushki, Matthew. "Būyids". In Madelung, Wilferd; Daftary, Farhad (eds.). Encyclopaedia Islamica Online. Brill Online. ISSN 1875-9831.
- Tafazzoli, Ahmad (1999). "Fahlavīyāt". In Yarshater, Ehsan (ed.). Encyclopædia Iranica. Vol. IX/2: Excavations IV–Fārābī V. Music. London and New York: Routledge & Kegan Paul. pp. 158–162. ISBN 978-0-933273-27-6.
- Turner, John P. (2006). "'Adud al-Dawla". Medieval Islamic Civilization: A-K, index. Taylor & Francis. p. 16. ISBN 9780415966917.
