= Abu Ishaq Ibrahim (Buyid) =

Son of Buyid emir Mu'izz al-Dawla

- Born: 21 September 953; Baghdad
- Died: after 978; Egypt (?)
- Dynasty: Buyid dynasty
- Father: Mu'izz al-Dawla
- Mother: Daughter of Ispahdost
- Religion: Shia Islam

Abu Ishaq Ibrahim, also known by his honorific title of Umdat al-Dawla ("Mainstay of the Empire"), was a Buyid prince, who was the youngest son of the Buyid ruler Mu'izz al-Dawla.

== Life ==
=== Family and conflict with the Hamdanids ===
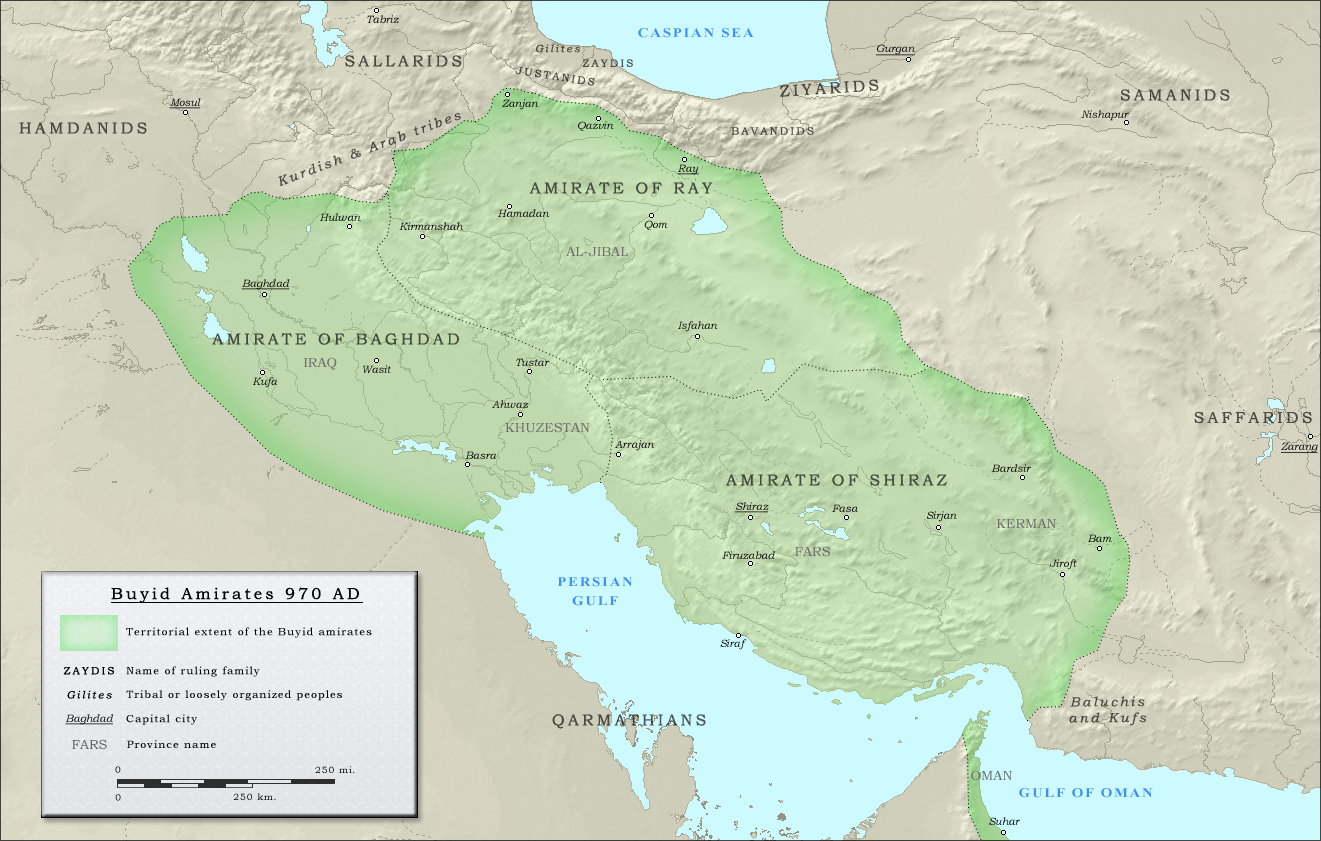
The Buyid amirates in ca. 970

Abu Ishaq was born on 21 September 953, his father was Mu'izz al-Dawla, while his mother was a daughter of the Dailamite officer Ispahdost. Abu Ishaq had four brothers named Bakhtiyar, Habashi, Marzuban, Abu Tahir, and a sister named Zubayda. Abu Ishaq, during his youth, was tutored in Baghdad. In 967, Mu'izz al-Dawla died and was succeeded by Bakhtiyar, who was then given the title of "'Izz al-Dawla". In ca. 972, Abu Ishaq was given the honorific title of "Umdat al-Dawla".

In 973, while Izz al-Dawla and his Turkish general Sabuktakin were campaigning in the territories of the Hamdanid ruler Abu Taghlib, the latter outflanked the Buyid army and marched towards Baghdad. Abu Ishaq, along with his mother, the Abbasid Caliph al-Muti, including the women and children of the city, fortified themselves in a castle, waiting for Sabuktakin to return to Baghdad. The vizier of 'Izz al-Dawla, Ibn Baqiyya, shortly arrived to Baghdad and aided Abu Ishaq in strengthening the defenses of Baghdad. In the end a treaty was made, which resulted in the restoration of Mosul and its surrounding areas to the Hamdanids.

=== Rebellion of Sabuktakin ===
Some months later, 'Izz al-Dawla, who had financial difficulties, tried to solve them by seizing the Turkish fiefs, most of which were in Khuzestan. At the same time, he dismissed Sabuktakin from his post. These actions made most of the army become hostile to 'Izz al-Dawla, and while 'Izz al-Dawla was away from Baghdad, the army under Sabuktakin then wished to make Abu Ishaq to become the new Buyid ruler of Iraq. Abu Ishaq shortly received these news, and at first thought to join them, but after the urging from his mother, he declined the proposal.

The army then shortly openly rebelled, and Abu Ishaq along with his mother and brother Abu Tahir, including their followers, then made an agreement with Sabuktakin to stop resistance in return for safety. The rebels shortly managed to capture Baghdad, and then marched towards Wasit, where 'Izz al-Dawla had fortified himself. During the siege, Sabuktakin died, and was succeeded by Alptakin as the leader of the rebels.

Fortunately for the family of 'Izz al-Dawla, his cousin, 'Adud al-Dawla, the ruler of Fars, who had been ordered by his father Rukn al-Dawla to aid 'Izz al-Dawla, arrived to Iraq, and in 974, along with 'Izz al-Dawla and Abu Ishaq, including other officers, advanced towards al-Mada'in, and by 975 the rebels were completely defeated. After order was made in Iraq, Abu Ishaq was given a robe of honor by Rukn al-Dawla. He was also appointed as the governor of Ahvaz by 'Izz al-Dawla.

Map of Early Islamic Syria and its provinces

=== Invasion of 'Adud al-Dawla and the flight to Syria ===
In 976, after the death of Rukn al-Dawla, war shortly ensured between 'Izz al-Dawla and 'Adud al-Dawla. Abu Ishaq was then sent to 'Askar Mukram in Khuzistan to secure the front of Izz al-Dawla's kingdom. Meanwhile, 'Adud al-Dawla was advancing towards Ramhurmuz, where he routed the army of the city and captured it. After receiving the news of the fall of Ramhurmuz, 'Izz al-Dawla ordered Abu Ishaq to withdraw from 'Askar Mukram and return to Iraq. 'Adud al-Dawla then advanced towards Iraq, and routed another army, which made Abu Ishaq, his brother, and Ibn Baqiyya flee from the frontier.

'Adud al-Dawla eventually managed to capture Baghdad, and gave 'Izz al-Dawla and his brothers permission to settle in Syria. 'Izz al-Dawla, along with his son Marzuban ibn Bakhtiyar and his brothers Abu Ishaq and Abu Tahir, then went to Damascus, which had been captured by the rebel Alptakin and his followers. Alptakin warmly received the Buyid brothers and their followers, but then made them involved in his conflict with the Fatimid Caliphate of Egypt. A battle shortly ensued at Ramla. However, during the battle, Marzuban betrayed Alptakin and abandoned the battlefield.

The forces of Alptakin were shortly defeated, and Abu Tahir was killed, while Abu Ishaq was taken captive by the Fatimids. After this event, Abu Ishaq is no longer mentioned any source. He died in 994/95.

== Sources ==
- Amedroz, Henry F.; Margoliouth, David S., eds. (1921). The Eclipse of the 'Abbasid Caliphate. Original Chronicles of the Fourth Islamic Century, Vol. V: The concluding portion of The Experiences of Nations by Miskawaihi, Vol. II: Reigns of Muttaqi, Mustakfi, Muti and Ta'i. Oxford: Basil Blackwell.
- Busse, Heribert (2004) [1969]. Chalif und Grosskönig – Die Buyiden im Irak (945-1055) [Caliph and Great King – The Buyids in Iraq (945-1055)] (in German). Würzburg: Ergon Verlag. ISBN 3-89913-005-7.
- Donohue, John J. (2003). The Buwayhid Dynasty in Iraq 334 H./945 to 403 H./1012: Shaping Institutions for the Future. Leiden and Boston: Brill. ISBN 90-04-12860-3.
- Kennedy, Hugh (2004). The Prophet and the Age of the Caliphates: The Islamic Near East from the 6th to the 11th Century (Second ed.). Harlow: Longman. ISBN 978-0-582-40525-7.
