= Marzuban ibn Bakhtiyar =

Marzuban ibn Bakhtiyar was a Buyid prince, and the son of the Buyid ruler of Iraq, 'Izz al-Dawla Bakhtiyar.

Little is known of Marzuban's life. In 970, he married a daughter of the Turkic officer Bukhtakin Azadruwayh. In 975, he received the title of I'zaz al-Dawla (lit. 'Fortification of the Empire') from the Abbasid caliph al-Ta'i, while several other of his family members and officers received other titles. After the defeat of his father in 977 at the hands of his relative 'Adud al-Dawla, he, along with his father and uncles went to Damascus, where they were warmly received by its ruler, Alptakin, who, however, made them involved in his conflict with the Fatimid Caliphate of Egypt.

A battle shortly ensured at Ramla between the army of Alptakin and the Fatimids. However, during the battle, Marzuban betrayed Alptakin and abandoned the battlefield. The forces of Alptakin were shortly defeated, and Marzuban's uncle Abu Tahir was killed, while his other uncle Abu Ishaq Ibrahim was taken captive by the Fatimids. Nothing further is heard of Marzuban.

== Sources ==
- Amedroz, Henry F.; Margoliouth, David S., eds. (1921). The Eclipse of the 'Abbasid Caliphate. Original Chronicles of the Fourth Islamic Century, Vol. V: The concluding portion of The Experiences of Nations by Miskawaihi, Vol. II: Reigns of Muttaqi, Mustakfi, Muti and Ta'i. Oxford: Basil Blackwell.
