= Lashkarwarz =

Buyid general

Abu Mansur Lashkarwarz ibn Sahlan, better known as simply Lashkarwarz (also spelled Lashkarwaz), was a Daylamite military officer who served the Buyid dynasty. He was the son of a certain Sahlan, and had a brother named Musafir. Lashkarwarz is first mentioned in participating in the army of the Buyid vizier Abu Muhammad al-Hasan al-Muhallabi in the defense of Basra against the Wajihid ruler of Oman, Yusuf ibn Wajih. In 954, Lashkarwarz was sent to aid the Muhtajid ruler Abu 'Ali Chaghani, whose claims to Samanid Khorasan was supported by the Buyids. However, this attempt turned fruitless, and Abu 'Ali died one year later of disease. Lashkarwarz also had a daughter who married the son of the Buyid ruler Mu'izz al-Dawla, Izz al-Dawla. Lashkarwarz along with his brother died in 958.

== Sources ==
- Amedroz, Henry F.; Margoliouth, David S., eds. (1921). The Eclipse of the 'Abbasid Caliphate. Original Chronicles of the Fourth Islamic Century, Vol. V: The concluding portion of The Experiences of Nations by Miskawaihi, Vol. II: Reigns of Muttaqi, Mustakfi, Muti and Ta'i. Oxford: Basil Blackwell.
- Donohue, John J. (2003). The Buwayhid Dynasty in Iraq 334 H./945 to 403 H./1012: Shaping Institutions for the Future. Leiden and Boston: Brill. ISBN 90-04-12860-3.
