= Battle of Baghdad (946) =

Buyid victory over the Hamdanid dynasty

- Part of the Buyid–Hamdanid Wars
- Boundary established between the Buyid and Hamdanid amirates at the end of the war (dashed line).
Date	April–August 946
Location	Baghdad, modern-day Iraq
Result	Buyid victory
Territorial changes	Baghdad conquered by the Buyids

Belligerents
Buyid Emirate of Iraq and Khuzestan	Abbasid Caliphate; Hamdanid Emirate of Mosul

Commanders and leaders
Mu'izz al-Dawla; Abu Ja'far Saymari; Ispahdost	Nasir al-Dawla (surrendered); Abu Ja'far Muhammad ibn Shirzad; Abu 'Abdallah Husayn b. Sa'id

The Battle of Baghdad (946) (Arabic: مَعْرَكَةُ بَغْدَاد, romanized: Maʿrakatu baghdād) was fought between the forces of the Buyid Emirate of Iraq under Mu'izz al-Dawla and the Hamdanid Emirate of Mosul under Nasir al-Dawla within the city of Baghdad. The battle lasted for several months; it eventually ended in victory for the Buyids, who expelled the Hamdanids from Baghdad with a major offensive and secured control of the city.

The battle was the first conflict in the Buyid–Hamdanid wars; it was also the only conflict to occur largely in Buyid, rather than Hamdanid, territory.

== Background ==
Baghdad became a Buyid possession when Ahmad ibn Buya advanced from Ahvaz with his army and entered the city in December 945. Upon his arrival he met with the Abbasid caliph al-Mustakfi, who agreed to give him control of the affairs of the state and conferred on him the honorific of "Mu'izz al-Dawla." News of this event was received negatively by the Hamdanid amir Nasir al-Dawla, who ruled over Mosul and the districts of the eastern Jazira. Nasir al-Dawla had previously controlled Baghdad in 942 and he still entertained hopes of regaining the city; Mu'izz al-Dawla's takeover of the capital was therefore an unwelcome development for him.

Nasir al-Dawla had reason to be confident that he could defeat Mu'izz al-Dawla if he made an attempt to capture Baghdad. His army had been bolstered by the arrival of numerous Turkish soldiers who had fled from Baghdad just before Mu'izz al-Dawla's entrance into the capital, and he was much more familiar with the territory between Mosul and Baghdad than his rival was. Mu'izz al-Dawla, on the other hand, was on less secure ground; Baghdad was in a sorry state thanks to years of mismanagement and he was hamstrung by its numerous financial and military problems. Nasir al-Dawla furthermore gained a pretext for war when in January 946 Mu'izz al-Dawla deposed and blinded the caliph al-Mustakfi and replaced him with the more obedient al-Muti'. As a result of these factors, Nasir al-Dawla took a belligerent tone with the Buyids; he withheld the payment of tribute to Baghdad, refused to recognize al-Muti' as caliph, and continued to mint coins in al-Mustakfi's name.

== Initial hostilities ==
It quickly became clear that the two amirs would be unable to work out an agreement with each other. In February 946, Mu'izz al-Dawla sent an army under the command of Musa Fayadhah and Yanal Kushsh to Ukbara in preparation for a campaign to conquer Mosul. The expedition was terminated, however, when Yanal Kusush suddenly attacked Musa and deserted to the Hamdanids. Nasir al-Dawla responded to this act of aggression by leading his army, which included a number of Turks, to Samarra the following month. Mu'izz al-Dawla similarly gathered his forces and departed from Baghdad with the caliph al-Muti' for Ukbara.

While stationed at Samarra, Nasir al-Dawla sent his brother Jubayr to sneak around the Buyid army and head south to Baghdad. When Jubayr arrived at the city, he was welcomed by the citizens and by Mu'izz al-Dawla's former secretary Abu Ja'far ibn Shirzad, who declared his allegiance to the Hamdanids and administered the affairs of Baghdad on their behalf. Nasir al-Dawla then decided to head for Baghdad himself. Leaving his cousin al-Husayn ibn Sa'id in the field to distract Mu'izz al-Dawla, he headed south and reached western Baghdad on April 15, and though he was forced to destroy his baggage when a number of Dailamites threatened to seize it, he and his forces were able to gain control of the city.

When Mu'izz al-Dawla learned that he had lost Baghdad, he gathered his Dailamite soldiers, who had been busy plundering Tikrit and Samarra, and headed back to the city. When he arrived, he found that Nasir al-Dawla had crossed the Tigris and set up camp outside the Shammasiyyah quarter of eastern Baghdad; he therefore dug in on the western side of the city, and the two sides prepared for fighting.

== The battle ==
=== Stalemate ===
For the next three months, control of Baghdad was divided between the Hamdanids and Buyids, with the Tigris acting as a dividing line between them. On the Hamdanid side, Nasir al-Dawla promoted Ibn Shirzad to serve as one of his chief commanders, while on the western side, Abu Ja'far Saymari, the chief secretary of Mu'izz al-Dawla, managed the Buyid war effort.

Both sides were clearly determined to take permanent control of the city, and the battle quickly turned into a stalemate. Combat took place in multiple locations throughout Baghdad, with both the Hamdanid and Buyid forces launching offensive sorties against each other. Neither side, however, was able to generate a victory large enough to win control of both halves of the city. Getting troops across the Tigris successfully was a challenge, and even if an army managed to make it to the opposite shore, they were usually forced to retreat in short order.

The attempts of the opposing sides to gain control of the Tigris were a major aspect of the fighting. The Hamdanid and Buyid armies both built zabzabs or small riverboats and used these to launch attacks on each other. Each day, Ibn Shirzad led a number of zabzabs filled with Turks up and down the Tigris, and they shot arrows at the Dailamites stationed on the western side of the city. Mu'izz al-Dawla also constructed a fleet of zabzabs, and his troops used these to battle the Hamdanid forces patrolling the river.

On the eastern side, Nasir al-Dawla attempted to legitimize his seizure of the city by re-issuing the coinage of 942–3, from when he had last been in control of Baghdad. At least part of the population accepted his claims and supported him throughout the fighting. Ibn Shirzad was also able to augment the ranks of the Hamdanid forces by enlisting local citizens and criminals, and they participated in attacks on Mu'izz al-Dawla's Dailamite troops.

The economy of Baghdad suffered greatly throughout the fighting. Both sides seized the produce of local cultivators to feed their troops. Eastern Baghdad was able to avoid any serious shortages thanks to shipments flowing down from Mosul, but the western side was subjected to a blockade for the duration of the conflict. Nasir al-Dawla's forces prevented civilians on the western side from crossing to the eastern, while a number of allied Arab tribes surrounded western Baghdad and cut off the flow of supplies. The blockade was effective and soon shortages were rampant on the Buyid side; the price of bread soared to more than six times what it was selling for on the eastern side of the river, and was sometimes not available at all. Starving people were reduced to eating grass and carrion, and several women were executed for acts of cannibalism.

=== Buyid victory ===
By July 945, with no end to the battle in sight and with the blockade making supplies increasingly scarce, Mu'izz al-Dawla was giving serious thought to abandoning western Baghdad and retreating to Ahvaz. He eventually decided to make one final attempt to take the eastern side, and if the effort failed he would give the order to withdraw. He gave orders to his chief secretary Saymari to cross to the eastern bank with a number of handpicked Dailamites, while he himself would attempt to distract the Hamdanid forces with a ruse.

The plan was carried out on the night of August 1. Mu'izz al-Dawla led a number of men north, instructing them to light torches and blast trumpets along the way. The Hamdanid army, seeing his movements, moved north as well to prevent him from crossing the river. Saymari and his soldiers were therefore free to cross to the eastern side and began to do so. When the Hamdanid army realized what was happening, they sent a number of men in zabzabs to stop him, and a fierce fight broke out. Eventually the Dailamites were victorious and the Hamdanid forces were pushed back to the Shammasiyyah gate at the northeastern corner of the city.

As the Dailamites spread throughout eastern Baghdad, the Hamdanid army began to fall apart in disorder. Nasir al-Dawla, realizing that he was in danger of losing the city, ordered Ibn Shirzad to take command of the troops and push the Dailamites back across the river. Ibn Shirzad set out, but when he attempted to convince the panicking soldiers to regroup he was unable to do so and therefore decided to flee. Nasir al-Dawla then realized that the fight was lost and joined the retreat; the Hamdanid forces withdrew from Baghdad and allowed the Buyids to take control of the city.

Eastern Baghdad, meanwhile, remained in a state of turmoil. The Dailamite army occupied the eastern quarters of the city and began retaliating against the population for their support of the Hamdanids during the fighting. Ignoring an order by Mu'izz al-Dawla to refrain from pillaging, they began looting, set fire to houses, and killed a number of civilians. Many of the residents fled in fear and attempted to head north to Ukbara, but died along the way in the summer heat. The chaos ceased only when Saymari executed several pillagers and sent out patrols to reestablish order.

== Aftermath ==
Following their expulsion from Baghdad, Nasir al-Dawla, Ibn Shirzad, and the Hamdanid army proceeded up the Tigris to Ukbara to regroup. After they arrived, Nasir al-Dawla sent an envoy to Mu'izz al-Dawla to sue for peace. Mu'izz al-Dawla agreed to the terms, and the war between the two sides came to an end. Mu'izz al-Dawla agreed to recognize the Hamdanid as ruler of the territory from Tikrit northwards, and to release him from the obligation of transmitting tax revenues from Mosul and the Diyar Bakr district. In exchange, Nasir al-Dawla was made responsible for forwarding the tax proceeds of Ikhshidid Egypt and Syria on to Baghdad, and promised to regularly send supplies to the city which were to be exempt from any taxes; in addition, he agreed to recognize al-Muti' as the legitimate caliph.

The Turkish mercenaries in the Hamdanid army, who were vehemently opposed to Mu'izz al-Dawla's continued occupation of Baghdad, were not informed that Nasir al-Dawla was seeking peace with the Buyids. When they learned that the two amirs had agreed to a treaty, they rebelled against Nasir al-Dawla and compelled him to flee. Nasir al-Dawla was forced to call on Mu'izz al-Dawla for assistance, and a Buyid army under the command of Saymari was sent to quell the Turks and enforce the treaty. Saymari defeated the rebels and confirmed Nasir al-Dawla in his position, but also confiscated a number of supplies and took a son of Nasir al-Dawla as a hostage to ensure that he would abide by the terms of the peace; he then returned to Baghdad.

Ultimately, peace did not last for long between the two sides, and less than three years later the Buyids and Hamdanids were again at war with each other.
