= Wajihids =

Arab dynasty

Wajihids بَنُو وَجِيْه
- 926–965
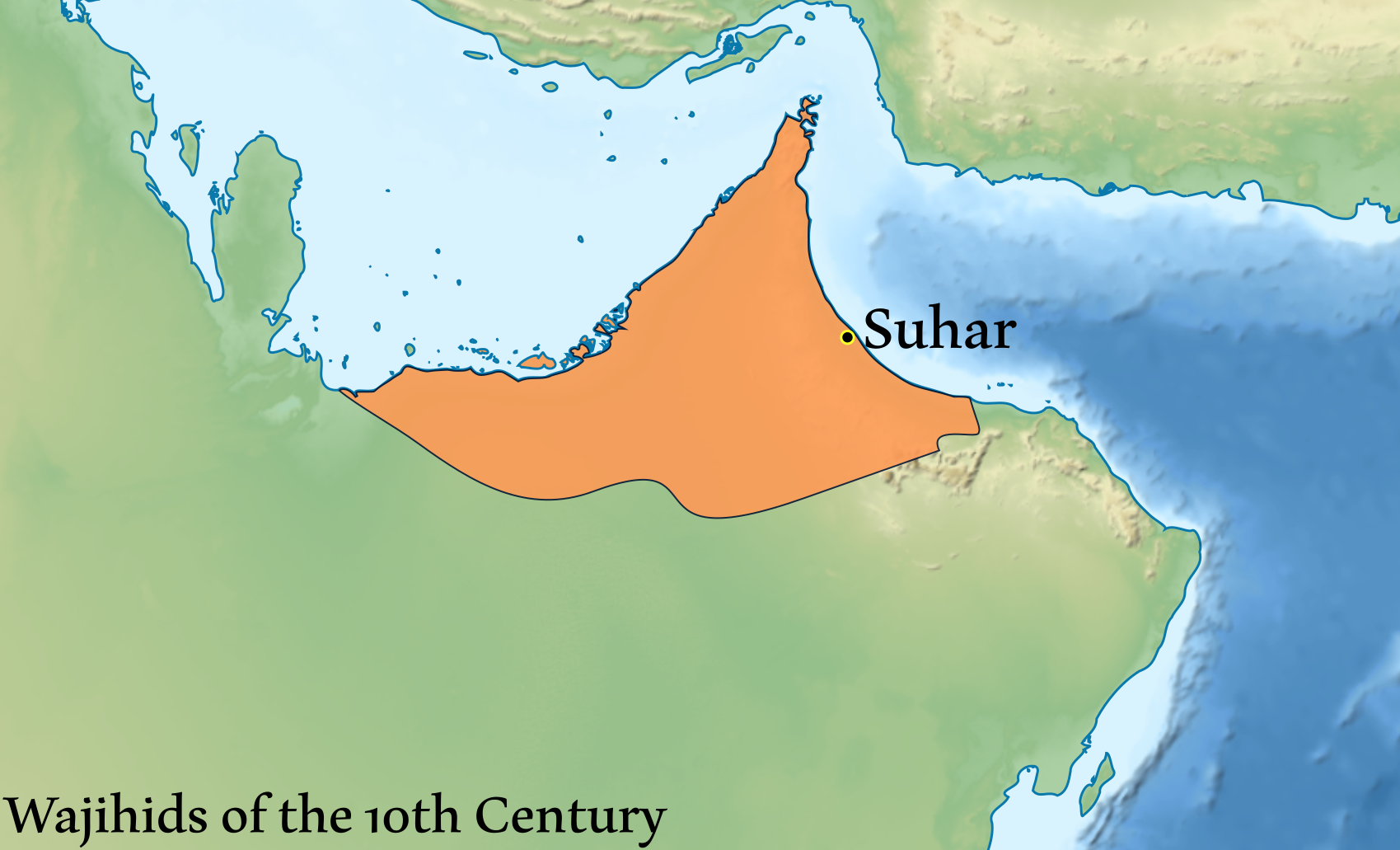
- Capital: Suhar
- Official languages: Arabic
- Religion: Islam
- Government: Monarchy
- Emir
  - 926–945: Yusuf ibn Wajih (first)
  - 950–965: 'Umar ibn Yusuf (last)
- Historical era: Early Middle Ages
  - Established: 926
  - Disestablished: 965
| Preceded by | Succeeded by |
| Abbasids | Buyids |
- Today part of: Oman; UAE

The Wajihids (Arabic: بَنُو وَجِيْه, romanized: Banū Wajīh) were an Arab dynasty that ruled in coastal Oman in the early and mid-10th century AD. Their capital was the town of Suhar, after moving there from Al-Buraimi Oasis or Tawam, where they had been in the 9th century.

== History ==
The origins and history of this dynasty are obscure. They may have been of either Omani or Bahraini origin, and they were possibly related to Ahmad ibn Hilal, a previous governor of Oman on behalf of the Abbasid Caliphate. In any event, by about 929, the coastal regions of Oman were under the control of Yūsuf ibn Wajīh (Arabic: يُوْسُف ابْن وَجِيْه), the first member of the dynasty.

According to the archaeologist Timothy Power, the origins of the Wajihids can be found in an account by the tenth-century chronicler al-Tabari. The latter source reported that in 893 or 894 during the Abbasid era, there was a dispute about who should rule Oman among the local factions. A faction that approached the Abbasids was the Bani Sama, who were based in Al-Buraimi or Tawam (which includes the modern Omani town of Al-Buraimi and the UAE city of Al Ain), before moving to Sohar. The Bani Sama also referred to themselves as the "Wajihid Dynasty", and assumed leadership over the region.

The Wajihids did not enjoy undisputed control of Oman. In the mountainous interior of the country, the Ibadi imams centered at Nizwa opposed Wajihid rule and were intent on maintaining their independent status. In addition, the neighboring Qarmatians of al-Hasa sought to gain possession of Suhar, and Qarmatian raids into Oman were common during this period. The Wajihids were able to neutralize these threats by using a mixture of force and diplomacy against both the Ibadis and Qarmatians. Wajihid policy in its relations with the neighboring powers was opportunistic, and they recognized the suzerainty of both the Qarmatians and Abbasids at different times during their rule.

Suhar during Wajihid rule was an extremely prosperous town and, along with Siraf, was one of the main seaports of the Gulf of Oman and the Persian Gulf. Its development during the tenth century turned it into a major center of international commerce and the chief city of Oman. The Wajihids were able to take control of the Suhari trade and they actively worked to maintain the town's economic status.

The Wajihids were chiefly known in the medieval sources for their two attacks on Basra. The first campaign occurred in 943, in response to excessive Basran customs dues on Omani shipping. The Wajihid military moved up the Tigris River and took possession of al-Ubullah, but the expedition failed when the Baridi rulers of Basra managed to destroy much of the Wajihid fleet. The second campaign, of 951-2, saw the Wajihids and their Qarmatian allies again advancing against Basra, which was now controlled by the Buyid amir Mu'izz al-Daula. The latter's vizier Abu Muhammad al-Hasan al-Muhallabi went to defend the town, and the Wajihids were once again defeated.

Yusuf ibn Wajih was succeeded by his son Muhammad, who was in term followed by his brother 'Umar. Wajihid rule was suddenly brought to an end in around 962 when 'Umar was killed by Nafi', a longtime mawlā of the dynasty. Nafi' then attempted to rule in 'Umar's place, and for the next several years Oman entered a period of anarchy, which ended only with the arrival of the Buyids and the establishment of a Buyid province in Oman.

== Rulers ==
The exact chronology of the Wajihid dynasty is difficult to determine. Coins that they minted during their reign are important in creating a ruler list. Based on available numismatic data, the Wajihids ruled as follows:

- Yusuf ibn Wajih (926/929–945)
- Muhammad ibn Yusuf (945)
- 'Umar ibn Yusuf (950–962/965)

Abdulrahman al-Salimi, in attempting to reconcile the numismatic data with information provided by written sources, came up with an alternative chronology:

- Ahmad ibn Hilal (c. 898–929)
- Yusuf ibn Wajih (926–952)
- Muhammad ibn Yusuf (942–951; as a co-ruler with his father)
- 'Umar ibn Yusuf (952–962; but posthumously recognized as ruler until 965)

== See also ==
- Lashkarwarz, a Buyid officer who warred with the Wajihids

== Sources ==
- Bates, Michael L. "Unpublished Wajihid and Buwayhid Coins from 'Uman in the American Numismatic Society." Arabian Studies I. Ed. R.B. Serjeant and R.L. Bidwell. Totowa, N.J.: Rowman and Littlefield, 1974. ISBN 0-87471-482-6
- Miles, S. B. The Countries and Tribes of the Persian Gulf. 1919. Reading, UK: Garnet & Ithaca Press, 1997. 187393856X
- Miskawaihi. The Eclipse of the Abbasid Caliphate: the Concluding Portion of the Experiences of the Nations, Vol. II. Trans. & ed. H. F. Amedroz and D. S. Margoliouth. London, 1921.
- Piacentini, Valeria Fiorani. "Sohar and the Daylami interlude (356–443/967–1051)." Proceedings of the Seminar for Arabian Studies 35: Papers from the thirty-eighth meeting of the Seminar for Arabian Studies held in London, 22–24 July 2004. Oxford: Archaeopress, 2005. ISBN 0-9539923-7-3
- Al-Salimi, Abdulrahman. "The Wajihids of Oman." Proceedings of the Seminar for Arabian Studies 39: Papers from the forty-second meeting of the Seminar for Arabian Studies held in London, 24–26 July 2008. Oxford: Archaeopress, 2009. ISBN 978-1-905739-23-3
- Wilkinson, John C. (2010). Ibadism: Origins and Early Development in Oman. New York: Oxford University Press. ISBN 978-0-19-958826-8.
