= Syrian campaigns of John Tzimiskes =

Campaigns in Syria and the Lavant, 974–975

- Part of the Arab–Byzantine wars
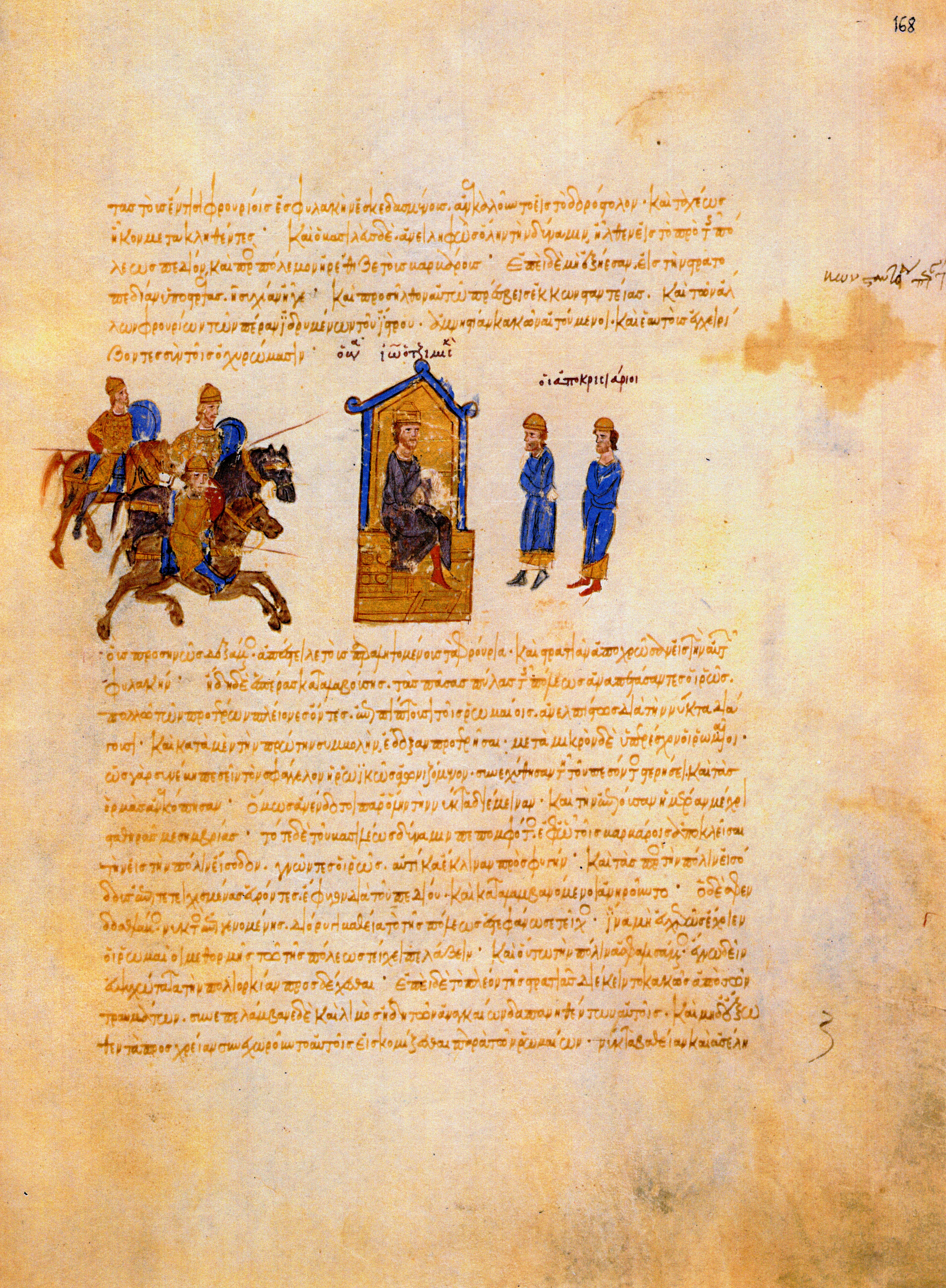
- John Tzimiskes receiving ambassadors from the Rus, miniature from the Madrid Skylitzes.
Date	974–975
Location	Syria, the Levant
Result	Byzantine victory
Territorial changes	Ephemeral conquest of much of the Levant by the Byzantine Empire

Belligerents
Byzantine Empire	Fatimid Caliphate; Buyid dynasty Hamdanid dynasty Emirate of Damascus

Commanders and leaders
John I Tzimiskes	Al-Mu'izz; Abu Taghlib; Alptakin; Kulayb; Izz al-Dawla; Sebük-Tegin

Casualties and losses
Unknown	Devastating

The Syrian campaigns of John Tzimiskes were a series of campaigns undertaken by the Byzantine emperor John I Tzimiskes against the Fatimid Caliphate in the Levant and against the Abbasid Caliphate in Syria. Following the weakening and collapse of the Hamdanid Dynasty of Aleppo, much of the Near East lay open to Byzantium, and, following the assassination of Nikephoros II Phokas, the new emperor, John Tzimiskes, was quick to engage the newly successful Fatimid Dynasty over control of the near east and its important cities, namely Antioch, Aleppo, and Caesarea. He also engaged the Hamdanid Emir of Mosul, who was de jure under the suzerainty of the Abbasid Caliph in Baghdad and his Buyid overlords, over control of parts of Upper Mesopotamia (Jazira).

== Background ==
Relations between the Byzantines in Asia Minor and the Fatimids in Egypt had taken a steep downward turn halfway through the 10th Century. Following the disintegration of the Hamdanid Dynasty in Aleppo, tensions between the two empires continued to inflate until conflict became inevitable. However, the Byzantines looked not only to expand into the Levant and Syria, following their conquest of Cilicia, but also to expand further east into Armenia and Upper Mesopotamia, modern Iraq, in order to unite with the native Christian peoples there and to cripple the power of the Abbasid Caliph, who was de facto under the suzerainty of the Buyids. Late in 969, John Tzimiskes, a prominent leader of the Byzantine army, assassinated Nikephoros Phokas, then the Byzantine Emperor, and ascended the throne.

Tzimiskes' reign, however, was almost immediately under threat, as in early 970 a large coalition of Rus armies crossed the Balkan Mountains and invaded Byzantium; Tzimiskes would have to put any eastern campaign on hold. Meanwhile, in the east, the Fatimids crushed the last of the Ikhshidid resistance in Syria and consolidated their power in Cairo. Tzimiskes would swiftly repel the invading Rus force at the Arcadiopolis, and, after conquering much of mainland Greece and Bulgaria in 971, the path for an eastern campaign was cleared. While Tzimiskes had been fighting in Bulgaria, the Fatimids managed to break into the Byzantine Empire itself and laid siege to Antioch, which had been captured from the Hamdanids six years earlier. Soon, by spring 971, an invading force of Qarmatians into Fatimid Syria forced the Egyptian army to withdraw. The failure of the Fatimids to take Antioch proved the stability of Byzantium's eastern front, and, later in 971, Tzimiskes planned to initiate yet another eastern campaign.

Tzimiskes left Constantinople in the spring of 972 and crossed the Euphrates in October of the same year. Tzimiskes quickly besieged and entered the city of Nisibis which he used to stage numerous raids on the surrounding countryside. The Hamdanid Emir of Mosul, Abu Taghlib, soon agreed to pay annual tribute to the Byzantines. Tzimiskes then quickly moved towards Martyropolis, but he was unable to take the city before the campaigning season ended.

=== Domestic of the East ===
As the campaigning season ended, Tzimiskes appointed to the position of Domestic of the East an Armenian named Mleh; his job was to maintain stability at the frontier. During the winter of 972–3, Mleh collected a strong force of Byzantine soldiers with the objective of putting pressure on Abu Taghlib. He quickly set out for the border town of Amida, while Taghlib responded by sending an army under his brother Hibat Allah to challenge the invaders. Mleh's army was swiftly destroyed with a few survivors entering the captivity of Taghlib, including Mleh, who would die in captivity by March 974. The defeat of Mleh was significant, as it undermined the Byzantine's position with the Armenians in terms of securing a possible alliance, as well as losing their annual tribute from Mosul. The defeat of Mleh would also cause a rift to form between Taghlib and the Caliph in Baghdad, Al-Muti, on the subject of how best to deal with the threat they posed. The Armenians soon held a conference, and, after discussing with Byzantine envoys, formed a deal to accompany the Byzantines in a joint invasion of Syria and Mesopotamia in Spring 974, Tzimiskes marched east and joined with the Armenian forces at the capital of Taron, Muş.

== Tzimiskes' invasion ==
Tzimiskes swiftly advanced through Taghlib's lands, accepting tribute from Amida and Martyropolis in turn; he soon passed Nisibis, which was then deserted. Tzimiskes hoped to eventually advance on Mosul, and perhaps even Baghdad itself, thereby breaking the power of the Arabs in Mesopotamia whilst also increasing his legitimacy at home. He soon advanced into Jazira. Later that year, however, Tzimiskes received news from across the fertile crescent: the Fatimids had crushed the Qarmatians in Syria and were now advancing up the Levant towards Antioch, having already taken Tripoli and Berytus. Tzimiskes realized that the risk posed to Antioch and Cilicia was far greater than any gains to be had from possessing Baghdad, and so he soon headed west, splitting his army in two. The Armenians were sent home and the Byzantines went on to resupply and refresh the garrison at Antioch. Tzimiskes then returned to Constantinople to celebrate a Triumph, and returned to the east in Spring 975.

Tzimiskes, once again, marched out of Antioch and down the Orontes, quickly taking Emesa. From there he besieged and took Heliopolis, and then advanced on Damascus, whose ruler, Amir Aftakin, a refugee from Baghdad who had recognized Fatimid suzerainty, surrendered his lands to Tzimiskes. He then marched south, taking Galilee, Tiberias, and Nazareth. Envoys from Acre soon reached Tzimiskes' camp on Mount Tabor accepting a Byzantine garrison. Envoys also arrived from Ramla and Jerusalem expressing their desire for Tzimiskes to take their cities. He soon took Caesarea, which would prove to be the limit of his advance.

At this point, Tzimiskes was far too concerned with the Fatimids' continual hold on the Levantine coast to advance further into Palestine. Important cities such as Tripoli, Sidon, and Byblos were still in Egyptian hands, and the clear threat these cities' garrisons posed to the integrity of Byzantine supply lines forced Tzimiskes to conquer these territories before advancing further. He proceeded to march to the coast and enter Berytus which was surrendered to him. He then marched north, sacked Byblos and headed to Tripoli. At Tripoli, Tzimiskes raided the countryside but did not capture the city. From there he marched north virtually unopposed, taking Balanea, Gabala, and numerous other cities. At this point, Tzimiskes now controlled all of the coast from Antioch to Caesarea, except for Tripoli. Tzimiskes then marched inland, mopping up any last pockets of resistance, including the cities of Lysias and Sahyun. Governors and garrisons were appointed for the conquered cities, the administration arranged, and Tzimiskes returned to Antioch in September 975.
