= Al-Ta'i' =

Abbasid Caliph in Baghdad (r. 974–991)

al-Ṭāʾiʿ liʾllāh الطائع لله
- Caliph; Commander of the Faithful
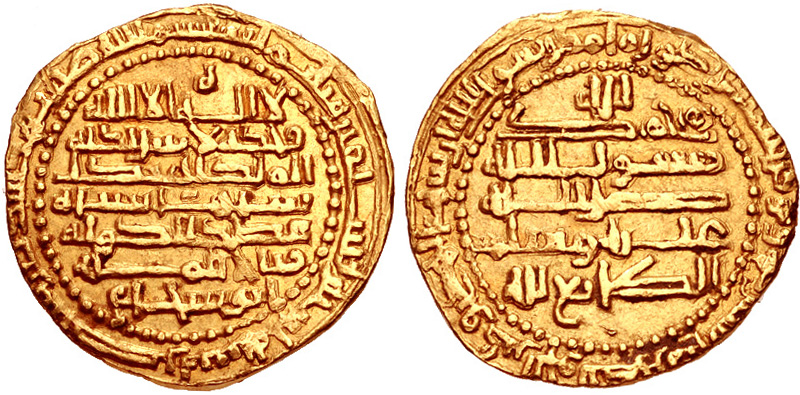
- Gold dinar of the Buyid ruler Adud al-Dawla, in the name of al-Ta'i' as caliph

24th Caliph of the Abbasid Caliphate
- Reign: 5 August 974 – 22 November 991
- Predecessor: al-Muti'
- Successor: al-Qadir
- Born: c. 929; Baghdad
- Died: 3 August 1003 (aged 73–74); Baghdad, Iraq
- Burial: Baghdad
- Spouse: Shah Zanan bint Izz al-Dawla (m. 977); Bint Adud al-Dawla
- Dynasty: Abbasid
- Father: al-Muti'
- Mother: Utb
- Religion: Sunni Islam

Abu Bakr ʿAbd al-Karīm ibn al-Faḍl (Arabic: أبو بكر عبد الكريم بن الفضل; 932 – 3 August 1003), better known by his regnal name al-Ṭāʾiʿ liʾllāh/biʾllāh (Arabic: الطائع لله\بالله, lit. 'He Who Obeys God's Command'), was the Abbasid caliph of Baghdad from 974 to his deposition in 991. He was in office during the domination of Iraq by the Shi'a Buyid dynasty, and as a result is generally considered a powerless figurehead under the thumb of the Buyid emirs. His tenure was also marked by strife between rival Buyid rulers and the frequent change of hands of Baghdad: al-Ta'i' himself was raised to the throne by a rebel Turkic general, Sabuktakin, who deposed al-Ta'i's father, al-Muti'. During periods of such strife, al-Ta'i' was able to exert some measure of political independence, but under stronger rulers he was sidelined, and was obliged to marry the daughters of the emirs Izz al-Dawla and Adud al-Dawla. Al-Ta'i's status suffered under Adud al-Dawla in particular, who turned to pre-Islamic Persian models for legitimacy, and relegated Iraq to the status of a simple province ruled from Fars. Al-Ta'i' was deposed on 22 November 991 by Baha al-Dawla, and replaced with his cousin, al-Qadir. He spent the rest of his days, until his death in 1003, confined to the caliphal palace.

== Origin and early life ==
Abd al-Karim, the future al-Ta'i', was born in Baghdad in 929 as the son of the Abbasid prince al-Fadl, son of Caliph al-Muqtadir, and a concubine of Greek origin, called Utb. As an adult, al-Ta'i's face was marked by smallpox, and he had a prominent nose, which became the object of satire by contemporaries.

His father came to the throne as caliph al-Muti' in 946, following the capture of Baghdad by the Buyid dynasty. While themselves espousing Shi'a beliefs, the Buyids nevertheless decided to retain the Abbasid caliphs out of expediency, and to provide them legitimacy in the eyes of the other Muslim rulers. In practice, however, al-Muti' was a puppet of the ruling Buyid emir of Iraq. A positive corollary of this subservience was that it brought stability to the caliphal throne: al-Muti' reigned as caliph for 29 Hijri years and four months, in stark contrast to his short-lived predecessors, and unlike them had to contend with remarkably few rival pretenders to the caliphate.

== Caliphate ==
=== Rise to the throne ===
On 1 August 974, the Turkic general Sabuktakin seized control of Baghdad from the Buyid ruler Izz al-Dawla. When the coup happened, al-Muti' left Baghdad along with the expelled members of the Buyid clan, but Sabuktakin forced him back and confined him to his palace. Al-Muti' was induced to abdicate with his health as a pretext, and was replaced by his oldest son, Abu Bakr Abd al-Karim, as Caliph al-Ta'i' li'llah on 5 August 974 (13 Dhu'l-Qa'dah 363 AH). This was the first father-to-son succession of the caliphate since al-Muktafi in 902.

Like his father, al-Ta'i' is considered by medieval and modern historians alike to have been a powerless figurehead, limited to appending his name to certificates of appointment and official correspondence, with others holding the real power. He played no role even in the numerous religious controversies of his day, and little is known about his activities other than his often conducting the Friday prayer at the Kadhimayn mosque, and his rebuilding the Bab al-hassa, one of the principal gates to the caliphal palace complex. The historian Heribert Busse however points out that al-Ta'i' managed to maintain his office for sixteen years in a very turbulent time, involving no fewer than six regime changes in Baghdad, and credits him with political acumen and flexibility.

The new caliph promptly named Sabuktakin as the chief emir (amir al-umara), with the honorific title Nasir al-Dawla. Before long, Sabuktakin, accompanied by al-Ta'i' and al-Muti', marched on Wasit, where the Buyid forces under Izz al-Dawla and his cousin, Adud al-Dawla, the ruler of Fars, gathered. Sabuktakin died on the way, and was succeeded by another Turkic ghulam, Alptakin. The Turks were defeated in January 975 near the Diyala River, and withdrew north to Tikrit, before they fled to Syria, while the Buyids entered Baghdad. Al-Ta'i's position under the Turks is unclear. He sent letters to Izz al-Dawla berating him of his errors and omissions as governor, but in later public letters he cursed them and claimed that he had been using dissimulation (taqiyya) in apparently siding with them. Thus, historian John Donohue writes of the "brief six months of independence that the caliphate enjoyed under the Turk rebels", while Heribert Busse writes of the caliph as being virtually the prisoner of the Turks.

At any rate, al-Ta'i' was soon able to recover his position at least somewhat, making use of the Buyids' quarrels and their need for legitimacy: in Baghdad, Adud al-Dawla deposed his cousin and assumed rule of the city. Leaving Tikrit, al-Ta'i' returned to Baghdad, where Adud al-Dawla received him with respect and restored to him his domains, that had apparently been confiscated (it is unclear by whom, likely by Izz al-Dawla). There are indications that he consulted with al-Ta'i' for a formal investment as emir, and his name was included in the Friday prayer before that of Izz al-Dawla. In the event, Adud al-Dawla bowed to pressure by his father, the senior Buyid emir Rukn al-Dawla, to withdraw and allow Iraq to remain a separate emirate under Izz al-Dawla.

=== Under Izz al-Dawla ===
The domains of the Buyid dynasty and the other states of the Middle East in c. 970

Following Adud al-Dawla's departure, Izz al-Dawla tried to consolidate his regime and gather allies against his cousin's hegemonic ambitions. This effort was also in al-Ta'i's interests, and included the awarding by the caliph of several honorific titles with the suffix al-Dawla to regional potentates, as well as Izz al-Dawla's vizier, Ibn Baqiyya.

When Rukn al-Dawla died in September 976, Adud al-Dawla seized control of the eastern half of the Buyid realm, while Izz al-Dawla in Iraq made himself de facto independent. Al-Ta'i' seized the opportunity to deepen the rift between the two cousins by conceding to the ambitious Izz al-Dawla high privileges that made him the co-equal of Adud al-Dawla: Ibn Baqiyya was named joint vizier of Izz al-Dawla and the caliph, Izz al-Dawla's titles were extended, and finally, the caliph himself married a daughter of the Buyid emir. Offended and challenged in his authority as successor of Rukn al-Dawla, Adud al-Dawla moved against his cousin. After a suitable delay likely meant to demonstrate his independence, al-Ta'i' joined Izz al-Dawla at his camp at Khuzistan, and sent a letter proposing peace to Adud al-Dawla. When this was rejected and Adud al-Dawla marched on his cousin, in a symbolic assertion of his independence, the caliph left the camp and returned to Baghdad. Adud al-Dawla defeated Izz al-Dawla in July 977, entering Baghdad on 23 December.

=== Under Adud al-Dawla ===
In a formal ceremony, Adud al-Dawla was invested as amir al-umara by al-Ta'i', with extensive new honours: he was awarded a crown and jewel-studded necklace, given the honorific Taj al-Milla ('Crown of the Muslim Community'), as well as a banner for himself and his heir, something hitherto reserved for the designated heirs of the caliphs. Adud al-Dawla also requested two special privileges: allowing him to enter the caliphal audience chamber on horseback, and the erection of a curtain so that when he prostrated himself in front of the caliph, this gesture of submission would not be seen by his companions. The caliph pointedly refused these demands, and even had a barrier built in front of the audience chamber, so that the Buyid ruler had no choice but dismount and enter on foot. Al-Ta'i' did, however, agree to the addition of some details to the ceremony that hearkened back to ancient Persian protocol, and that made it appear to the Buyid's companions as if Adud al-Dawla had been crowned king by the caliph. It is unclear whether al-Ta'i' was aware of the significance of these changes. Al-Ta'i' also agreed to accompany Adud al-Dawla in his campaign that defeated the remnants of Izz al-Dawla's forces at Samarra in May 978, whereupon he returned to Baghdad.

As the coronation episode reveals, Adud al-Dawla, and the Buyids generally, relied increasingly on pre-Islamic Persian traditions, ceremonies, and titles to bolster their position and claim an independent source of legitimacy. According to C. E. Bosworth, the Buyid ruler aimed at "a division of power between the caliphate and the monarchy, equivalent to the mediaeval European theories of church and empire", a conception entirely alien to al-Ta'i's worldview. Perhaps obliged to acquiesce to caliphal slights in order to secure recognition of his rule over Iraq, Adud al-Dawla initially treated al-Ta'i' with deference, restoring him all his privileges and paying for the renovation of the caliphal palace.

As soon as Izz al-Dawla and his Hamdanid allies in Upper Mesopotamia were defeated though, Adud al-Dawla launched a purge against the caliph's immediate environment, imprisoning the vizier Ibrahim al-Sabi, the chief qadi Ibn Ma'ruf, and other senior members of the Baghdad court. The dismissal of Ibn Ma'ruf in particular was a violation of the main remaining prerogative of the caliph under Buyid rule, namely the appointment of the chief qadi of Baghdad and Iraq. The posts of both the vizier and the chief qadi of Iraq were left vacant, and substituted by those for the Buyid capital province of Fars. Iraq was thus effectively reduced to a regular province of the Buyid empire, governed from a new imperial centre. Adud al-Dawla even usurped the last remaining, symbolic aspects of the caliph's office, namely the nomination of officials and governors in his name.

When Adud al-Dawla returned to Baghdad in 980, following his eastern campaigns, al-Ta'i' in person led the Buyid emir into the city; an unprecedented event, but, as Bosworth comments, "once again the caliph seems to have failed to appreciate the significance of the ceremony in which he was taking part". In a further move to bind the caliph closer to himself, in the second half of 980, Adud al-Dawla arranged for the marriage of one of his daughters with al-Ta'i'. If Adud al-Dawla may have hoped, as the contemporary historian Miskawayh has it, that the offspring of this union would one day unite the Abbasid caliphate with the Buyid kingship, it was not to be. Al-Ta'i' saw this marriage at worst as forced upon him, and at best as a token of distinction and condescension towards the Buyid emir, and resolutely refused to consummate it. This led to the final breach between al-Ta'i' and Adud al-Dawla, who introduced the provocative, Persian-derived and entirely un-Islamic title of shahanshah ('King of Kings') into his coinage even in Iraq.

=== Under Adud al-Dawla's successors ===
Adud al-Dawla died on 26 March 983 at the age of 49, leaving behind a large but unconsolidated empire, and an unregulated succession. Initially, the Buyid commanders gave the oath of allegiance to Adud al-Dawla's second son, Marzuban, under the name of Samsam al-Dawla. Al-Ta'i' recognized the succession, investing Samsam al-Dawla with the title of Shams al-Milla. Adud al-Dawla's oldest son, Shirdil, known as Sharaf al-Dawla, refused to accept this and seized Fars, thus limiting Samsam al-Dawla to Iraq, but even there the latter faced challengers: Upper Mesopotamia was lost to the Kurd Badh, while two younger sons of Adud al-Dawla held Khuzistan and Basra. In the eastern territories of the Buyid empire, at the same time, their uncle Fakhr al-Dawla laid claim to Adud al-Dawla's succession, claiming the tile of shahanshah for himself.

The Buyid quarrels offered opportunities for al-Ta'i': the officials ousted by Adud al-Dawla were reinstated, and the danger of Iraq's permanent relegation to a province ruled from elsewhere was ended for now, as it once again became a separate political unit under one of the Buyid emirs. Samsam al-Dawla reverted, at least formally, to making all appointments 'on the command of the Commander of the Faithful', and the disunity of the Buyids would allow the caliph to play a political role as arbiter between the quarreling emirs. In c. 985, he granted a subsidy to the Samanids towards the protection of the frontiers of Islam, and mediated a peace agreement between Samsam al-Dawla and Sharaf al-Dawla, after the latter occupied Khuzistan and Basra. In the treaty, concluded in June 986, Sharaf al-Dawla was recognized as the chief emir, and his name included in the Friday prayers in Baghdad. Both parties explicitly placed themselves under the caliph's formal authority. In the event, Sharaf al-Dawla quickly reneged on the agreement: using clashes between Daylamites and Turks in Baghdad as a pretext, he marched on the city, captured and imprisoned his brother in January 987, and was invested by the caliph as chief emir in May 987.

Sharaf al-Dawla's ascendancy was brief, as he died at Baghdad on 7 September 988. As his two sons were underage, he was succeeded by his younger brother Abu Nasr Firuz, with the regnal name of Baha al-Dawla. Al-Ta'i' recognized the succession, and invested Baha al-Dawla with the title of Diya al-Milla. Baha al-Dawla was quickly attacked by Fakhr al-Dawla, but the two Buyid emirs quickly came to terms—again with the caliph as arbiter—recognizing each other as rulers over their respective realms.

== Deposition and succession ==
Bereft of money with which to pay his army, the Buyid emir followed the advice of the powerful head of the chancery, Abu'l-Hasan ibn al-Mu'allim, to depose al-Ta'i' in order to seize the caliphal treasury. On 22 November 991 (12 Ramadan 381 AH), under the pretext of an audience, Baha al-Dawla's men seized the caliph. While the caliphal palace was plundered, the caliph was wrapped in a robe and brought to the emir's residence, where he was placed under arrest. He was succeeded by his cousin Abu'l-Abbas Ahmad, who took the throne as al-Qadir.

Al-Ta'i' had had strained relations with his cousin: in 988, the latter's half-sister, apparently motivated by an inheritance dispute, reported him as seeking to replace al-Ta'i' as caliph. To escape capture, Ahmad went into hiding for a while, before seeking refuge with the governor of the swamps of Bathihah near Basra, Muhadhdhib al-Dawla, for about three years. From there, Ahmad plotted against al-Ta'i', harping on his own loyalty to the Buyids, and drawing contrast to the fact that al-Ta'i' had been installed by a Turk.

Al-Ta'i' remained under arrest until September 992, when he was allowed to move to the caliphal palace. Despite their previous differences, al-Qadir treated him well. Al-Ta'i' was not blinded, as had been the case for previous deposed caliphs, and he was accorded treatment due to a reigning caliph. Al-Ta'i' died at the palace on 3 August 1003, and was buried in Rusafa, at a mausoleum he had erected across from the tombs of his father, al-Muti', and of his great-grandmother, the mother of al-Muqtadir, Shaghab.

Al-Ta'i's deposition had a long denouement: considering al-Qadir a puppet of the Buyids, the eastern dynasties of the Samanids and Ghaznavids refused to recognize the succession until 999/1000, continuing to use al-Ta'i's name in the Friday prayer and on coins until then. Furthermore, a relative of the deposed caliph, Abdallah ibn Ja'far, managed to escape custody in Baghdad and fled to Gilan, where he persuaded the local ruler that he was indeed al-Ta'i'. Only after Baghdad found out about this pretender was his true identity revealed.

== See also ==
- Timeline of 10th-century Muslim history

== Sources ==
- Al Rudainy, Reem Saud (2014). The Role of Women in the Būyid and Saljūq Periods of the Abbasid Caliphate (339-447/9501055&447-547/1055-1152): The Case of Iraq (PhD thesis). University of Exeter. hdl:10871/17529.
- Bosworth, C. E. (1975). "Iran under the Buyids". In Frye, Richard N. (ed.). The Cambridge History of Iran. Vol. 4. Cambridge: Cambridge University Press. pp. 250–305. ISBN 0-521-20093-8.
- Bürgel, Ch.; Mottahedeh, R. (1988). "ʿAŻOD-AL-DAWLA, ABŪ ŠOJĀʾ FANNĀ ḴOSROW". In Yarshater, Ehsan (ed.). Encyclopædia Iranica. Vol. III/3: Azerbaijan IV–Bačča(-ye) Saqqā. London and New York: Routledge & Kegan Paul. pp. 265–269. ISBN 978-0-71009-115-4.
- Busse, Heribert (2004) [1969]. Chalif und Grosskönig – Die Buyiden im Irak (945-1055) [Caliph and Great King – The Buyids in Iraq (945-1055)] (in German). Würzburg: Ergon Verlag. ISBN 3-89913-005-7.
- Demircan, Adnan (2010). "Tâi'-Lillâh". TDV Encyclopedia of Islam, Vol. 39 (Şeri̇f Paşa – Tanzanya) (in Turkish). Istanbul: Presidency of Religious Affairs, Centre for Islamic Studies. pp. 447–448. ISBN 978-975-389-632-0.
- Donohue, John J. (2003). The Buwayhid Dynasty in Iraq 334 H./945 to 403 H./1012: Shaping Institutions for the Future. Leiden and Boston: Brill. ISBN 90-04-12860-3.
- El-Azhari, Taef (2019). Queens, Eunuchs, and Concubines in Islamic History, 661-1257. Edinburgh: Edinburgh University Press. ISBN 978-1-4744-2319-9.
- Hanne, Eric J. (2007). Putting the Caliph in His Place: Power, Authority, and the Late Abbasid Caliphate. Madison, New Jersey: Fairleigh Dickinson University Press. ISBN 978-0-8386-4113-2.
- Kennedy, Hugh (2004). The Prophet and the Age of the Caliphates: The Islamic Near East from the 6th to the 11th Century (Second ed.). Harlow: Longman. ISBN 978-0-582-40525-7.
- Küçükaşcı, Mustafa Sabri (2001). "Kādir-Billâh". TDV Encyclopedia of Islam, Vol. 24 (Kāânî-i Şîrâzî – Kastamonu) (in Turkish). Istanbul: Presidency of Religious Affairs, Centre for Islamic Studies. pp. 127–128. ISBN 978-975-389-451-7.
- Zetterstéen, K. V. & Bosworth, C. E. (2000). "al- Ṭāʾiʿ Li-Amr Allāh". In Bearman, P. J.; Bianquis, Th.; Bosworth, C. E.; van Donzel, E. & Heinrichs, W. P. (eds.). The Encyclopaedia of Islam, Second Edition. Volume X: T–U. Leiden: E. J. Brill. p. 115. doi:10.1163/1573-3912_islam_SIM_7323. ISBN 978-90-04-11211-7.

al-Ta'i' Abbasid dynasty Born: 929 Died: 3 August 1003
Sunni Islam titles
| Preceded by al-Muti' | Caliph of the Abbasid Caliphate; 974–991 | Succeeded by al-Qadir |
