= Sabuktakin =

Turkic commander

Sabuktakin or Sübüktegin was a Turkic commander in the service of the Buyid dynasty. His power was such that he defied the Buyid ruler Bakhtiyar Izz al-Dawla, and even rose in revolt against him in 974, seizing control of Baghdad and threatening to overthrow Buyid rule in Iraq completely. His career was cut short by his own death in late 974. His successor, Alptakin, was defeated by the Buyids and fled to Damascus, where he eventually joined the Fatimids.

== Life ==
Sabuktakin was a Turkic slave who was set free by the first Buyid ruler of Iraq, Mu'izz al-Dawla (r. 945–967), and became, according to the historian Heribert Busse, the latter's "right-hand man". Sabuktakin first appears in 948/9, when was sent to aid Rukn al-Dawla in Rayy, which was threatened by the Sallarids and Samanids. There he also had to face the revolt of a Daylamite contingent in his army, led by a certain Burarish. Appointed to the post of chamberlain (hajib), Sabuktakin was primarily the commander of his fellow Turkic slave-soldiers (ghilman, sing. ghulam), but in addition he also functioned as commander-in-chief of the entire army (amir al-jaysh). He amassed a huge fortune, and built a large palace in the Mukharrim quarter of Baghdad. At the time of his death, he is reported to have possessed 10,000 camels and 4,000 brocade garments, including 2,000 of fine shushari silk and 500 prized pieces from the state factories of the Byzantine Empire.

Sabuktakin was one of a number of Turkic generals promoted to high office by Mu'izz al-Dawla as part of a policy designed to balance the dominant Daylamite element in the Buyid armies, which was prone to unrest and whose loyalty to the Buyids was dubious. The rivalry between the two main ethnic groups of the Buyid army, the freeborn Daylamites and the Turkish slave-soldiers, was intense. The Turks had provided the core of the Iraqi military since Abbasid times, but the Buyids were brought to power by their Daylamite soldiery, and both groups competed for privileges and income. In addition, where the Daylamites were partisans of Shi'a Islam, the Turks favoured Sunnism. Sabuktakin in particular became the object of hatred among the Daylamites. Mu'izz al-Dawla, and his successor, Bakhtiyar Izz al-Dawla (r. 967–978), tried to conciliate and balance the two groups, but largely in vain.

=== Conflict with Bakhtiyar Izz al-Dawla ===
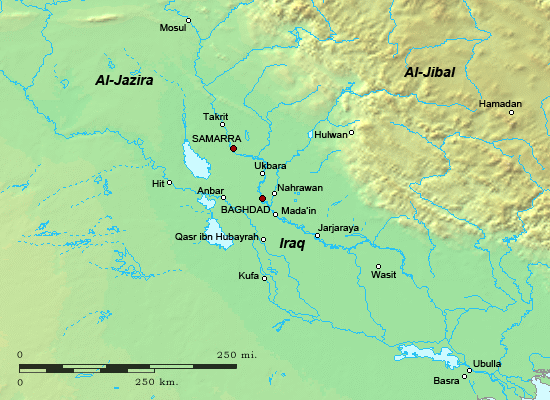
Map of Iraq in the 9th–10th centuries

As part of the efforts to strike a balance between the two groups, Mu'izz al-Dawla in his testament explicitly recommended to Bakhtiyar to retain Sabuktakin in office. Relations between Sabuktakin and Bakhtiyar Izz al-Dawla were strained and deteriorated further over time, as Sabuktakin felt offended by the Buyid's choices. Already in 972, the Buyid ruler tried to dismiss his powerful commander from office. In the event, Sabuktakin managed to retain his position. In 974, Bakhtiyar and Sabuktakin campaigned north in an attempt to take advantage of recent Byzantine advances in Upper Mesopotamia to finally subdue the Hamdanid ruler of Mosul, Abu Taghlib. The Hamdanids abandoned Mosul without a fight, but sent an army to threaten Baghdad, forcing Sabuktakin to return to the capital to confront the Hamdanids there. In the meantime, Bakhtiyar was left with little military strength in Mosul; the contemporary historian Miskawayh assumed that Sabuktakin deliberately delayed coming to his aid, and that he was conspiring with the Hamdanids to depose the Buyids. In the event, Bakhtiyar was forced to come to terms with the Hamdanids, making concessions to them. This deepened the rift between Bakhtiyar and Sabuktakin.

In the meantime, Sabuktakin was able to use the widespread calls for jihad among the populace for his own ends, by diverting the mob's ire to the Shi'a Buyids and their supporters. As the contemporary historian Miskawayh commented, "the dispute between the two factions, which had formerly been on religious questions, now became political as well, as the Shi'a adopted the watchword of Bakhtiyar and the Daylamites while the Sunni adopted that of Sabuktakin and the Turks".

=== Uprising ===
These events made the breach between Sabuktakin and his ostensible master inevitable: following the advice of Ibn Baqiyya, Bakhtiyar left Baghdad for Wasit and Ahwaz. They confiscated the military fiefs (iqta) of the Turks—including those of Sabuktakin himself—and instead sought to gain the support of the Daylamites. Finally, in July 974, the two rival parties clashed openly: Sabuktakin took control of Baghdad, and after a brief siege of their palace expelled the Buyid family members and the Daylamite soldiers from the city. Sabuktakin appointed a Sunni police prefect (sahib al-shurta) in Baghdad, who instituted a reign of terror among the capital's Shi'a population; after the Buyids recovered the city, he was publicly executed in the predominantly Shi'a quarter of Karkh. In the process, Sabuktakin also deposed the ailing caliph al-Muti and replaced him with his son, al-Ta'i. The new caliph promptly named Sabuktakin as the chief emir (amir al-umara), and gave him the honorific title of Nasr al-Dawla.

As the historian Hugh Kennedy comments, within a few months Sabuktakin had established what amounted to a Turkish emirate in Baghdad. Sabuktakin appears initially to have been content with ruling over Baghdad, and proposed leaving southern Iraq to the Buyids, but this was evidently unacceptable to the Buyids and untenable in the long run, as it would leave the Turks sandwiched between the Hamdanids in the north and the Buyids in the south. Before long, Sabuktakin and his forces marched on Wasit.

Bakhtiyar's position at Wasit was saved by turning to his relatives in Iran for assistance. Adud al-Dawla, the ruler of Fars, arrived to his aid. In addition, Sabuktakin died on the way to Wasit.

== Aftermath ==
Sabuktakin was succeeded by another ghulam, Alptakin, who lacked Sabuktakin's ability and was now faced with superior Buyid forces, which were joined by Arab bedouin tribes and the Hamdanids. Defeated in January 975 near the Diyala River, Alptakin moved west to Damascus with about 300 of his followers. Alptakin and his men ruled the city for a while, before they entered the service of the Fatimid Caliphate. Buyid control over Baghdad was restored, but the events had severely shaken the foundation of Buyid power in the area, and Baghdad entered a period of decline that lasted for the rest of the Buyid era.

Sabuktakin's utilization of anti-Shi'a sentiment in his conflict with the Buyids was also the first instance that the Turks as a people first became associated with the anti-Shi'a faction, presaging the policies of the Ghaznavids and the Seljuks and the Sunni Revival of the 11th century.

== Sources ==
- Bosworth, C. E. (1975). "Iran under the Būyids". In Frye, Richard N. (ed.). The Cambridge History of Iran. Vol. 4. Cambridge: Cambridge University Press. pp. 250–305. ISBN 0-521-20093-8.
- Busse, Heribert (2004) [1969]. Chalif und Grosskönig – Die Buyiden im Irak (945-1055) [Caliph and Great King – The Buyids in Iraq (945-1055)] (in German). Würzburg: Ergon Verlag. ISBN 3-89913-005-7.
- Donohue, John J. (2003). The Buwayhid Dynasty in Iraq 334 H./945 to 403 H./1012: Shaping Institutions for the Future. Leiden and Boston: Brill. ISBN 90-04-12860-3.
- Kennedy, Hugh (2004). The Prophet and the Age of the Caliphates: The Islamic Near East from the 6th to the 11th Century (Second ed.). Harlow: Longman. ISBN 978-0-582-40525-7.
