= Ispahdost =

Buyid general

Ispahdost (Persian: اسپهدوست) or Isfahdust (Arabic: اسفهدوست), was a Daylamite military officer who served the Buyid dynasty. He first appears as an officer of the Buyid ruler Mu'izz al-Dawla during his conquest of Abbasid Iraq in 945. Furthermore, Ispahdost is later mentioned as the brother-in-law of Mu'izz al-Dawla, and one year later, participated in the defense of Baghdad against the Hamdanids. In 948, Ispahdost, along with the Abbasid caliph al-Muti, planned a plot against Mu'izz al-Dawla, which, however, Mu'izz al-Dawla became informed of, and had Ispahdost imprisoned, who soon died.

== Sources ==
- Amedroz, Henry F.; Margoliouth, David S., eds. (1921). The Eclipse of the 'Abbasid Caliphate. Original Chronicles of the Fourth Islamic Century, Vol. V: The concluding portion of The Experiences of Nations by Miskawaihi, Vol. II: Reigns of Muttaqi, Mustakfi, Muti and Ta'i. Oxford: Basil Blackwell.
- Donohue, John J. (2003). The Buwayhid Dynasty in Iraq 334 H./945 to 403 H./1012: Shaping Institutions for the Future. Leiden and Boston: Brill. ISBN 90-04-12860-3.
