= Ibn Baqiyya =

Abu Tahir Muhammad ibn Muhammad ibn Baqiyya, also known as Nasir-al-Dawla, Naseh, best known as Ibn Baqiyya, was a statesman of the Buyid dynasty, who served as the vizier of Izz al-Dawla from 973 to 977.

== Biography ==
A native of Awana, a place near Baghdad, Ibn Baqiyya belonged to a low-class family. Because of this, he would later get suspected by his opponents in helping low-class statesman to prominent posts. He first appears during conquest of Abbasid Iraq by Buyid ruler Mu'izz al-Dawla. He soon rapidly rose to higher posts, and by 973 managed to become the vizier of Mu'izz al-Dawla's son and successor, Izz al-Dawla (r. 967–978). However, hostiles slowly arose between Izz al-Dawla and his cousin Adud al-Dawla, who ruled in Fars and Kerman. Ibn Baqiyya, who knew of the strong power which Adud al-Dawla possessed, sought to gain his favor.

In 975, Adud al-Dawla invaded Iraq; meanwhile Izz al-Dawla suspected Ibn Baqiyya of treachery, and after his defeat at Ahvaz in 977 by Adud al-Dawla, removed Ibn Baqiyya from the vizierate and had him blinded. After a bloody struggle, Adud al-Dawla managed in the end to defeat Izz al-Dawla and have him executed. Ibn Baqiyya was spared, but because an insult he had made to Adud al-Dawla he was later arrested by a force sent by Adud al-Dawla under Bahram ibn Ardashir al-Majusi and other statesmen; Ibn Baqiyya was shortly trampled to death, and would first be buried after the death of Adud al-Dawla in 983.

== Sources ==
- Bosworth, C. Edmund (2010). "EBN BAQIYA". In Yarshater, Ehsan (ed.). Encyclopædia Iranica (Online ed.). Encyclopædia Iranica Foundation.
- Donohue, John J. (2003). The Buwayhid Dynasty in Iraq 334 H./945 to 403 H./1012: Shaping Institutions for the Future. Leiden and Boston: Brill. ISBN 90-04-12860-3.
- Kennedy, Hugh (2004). The Prophet and the Age of the Caliphates: The Islamic Near East from the 6th to the 11th Century (Second ed.). Harlow: Longman. ISBN 978-0-582-40525-7.
- Kraemer, Joel L. (1992). Humanism in the Renaissance of Islam: The Cultural Revival During the Buyid Age. BRILL. ISBN 9789004097360.

Preceded by Abu'l-Fadl Shirazi	Vizier of the Buyid amirate of Iraq; 973–977	Unknown
