= Al-Muti' =

Abbasid Caliph in Baghdad (r. 946–974)

al-Muṭīʿ li-ʾllāh المطيع لله
- Caliph; Commander of the Faithful
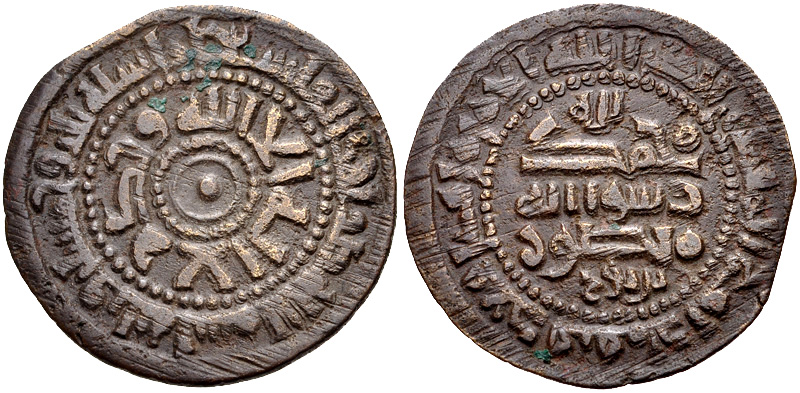
- Copper fals of the Samanid ruler Mansur I ibn Nuh, citing al-Muti' as overlord, Bukhara, 964/65 CE

Caliph of the Abbasid Caliphate
- Reign: 28 January 946 – 5 August 974
- Predecessor: al-Mustakfi
- Successor: al-Ta'i
- Born: 913/14; Baghdad
- Died: 12 October 974 (aged 60); Dayr al-Aqul
- Burial: al-Rusafa, Baghdad
- Consort: Utb
- Issue: al-Ta'i
Names
- Abu'l-Qasim al-Fadl ibn Ja'far al-Muqtadir al-Muti' li-'llah
- Dynasty: Abbasid
- Father: al-Muqtadir
- Mother: Mash'ala
- Religion: Sunni Islam

Abū ʾl-Qāsim al-Faḍl ibn al-Muqtadir (Note: Arabic: أبو القاسم الفضل بن المقتدر) (913/14 – September/October 974), better known by his regnal name of al-Muṭīʿ li-ʾllāh (Note: Arabic: المطيع لله) (lit. 'Obedient to God'), was the Abbasid caliph in Baghdad from 946 to 974, ruling under the tutelage of the Buyid emirs.

Al-Muti's reign represented the nadir of the Abbasid caliphate's power and authority. In previous decades, the secular authority of the caliphs had shrunk to Iraq, and even there had been curtailed by powerful warlords; with the Buyid conquest of Baghdad, it was now abolished entirely. Al-Muti' was raised to the throne by the Buyids and was effectively reduced to a rubber-stamp figurehead, albeit with some vestiges of authority over judicial and religious appointments in Iraq. The very fact of his subordination and powerlessness helped restore some stability to the caliphal institution: in stark contrast to his short-lived and violently deposed predecessors, al-Muti' enjoyed a long and relatively unchallenged tenure, and was able to hand over the throne to his son al-Ta'i'.

Al-Muti's prestige as the nominal leader of the Muslim world sharply declined during his tenure. Regional rivals to the Buyids delayed their recognition of al-Muti's caliphate, seeing in him only a Buyid puppet, and his inability to respond effectively to Byzantine advances tarnished his reputation. More importantly, the rise of Shi'a regimes across the Middle East directly challenged Sunni and Abbasid predominance. The Buyids themselves were Shi'a, but they retained the Abbasid caliphate out of expedience. Further west, the expanding Fatimid Caliphate posed a direct ideological and political challenge to the Abbasids. During al-Muti's reign, the Fatimids conquered Egypt and started to expand into the Levant, threatening Baghdad itself.

== Biography ==
=== Early life ===
The future al-Muti' was born in Baghdad in 913/14 as al-Fadl, a son of the Abbasid caliph, al-Muqtadir (r. 908–932), and a Slavic concubine, Mash'ala. He was the brother of caliphs al-Radi (r. 934–940) and al-Muttaqi (r. 940–944). Al-Muti' grew up in a time of crisis. Al-Muqtadir's reign was marked by factional strife, attacks by the Qarmatians, economic decline, and revenue shortages that led to military unrest, culminating in the murder of the caliph in 932. During the subsequent reigns of al-Radi and al-Muttaqi, the Abbasid central government lost control of the provinces to regional military strongmen. Even in the Abbasid metropolitan region of Iraq, military strongmen deprived the caliphs of real authority, and vied with one another for the title of amir al-umara (commander-in-chief, lit. 'chief emir') and the attendant control of the Abbasid government apparatus in Baghdad, that would allow them to pay their restive troops. Al-Muttaqi himself had been raised to the throne by the amir al-umara Bajkam, but attempted to play off the regional warlords—notably the Hamdanids of Mosul—to recover the independence and authority of his office. These attempts ended in failure, and resulted in his deposition and blinding by the amir al-umara Tuzun in September 944.

As the chief of the remaining sons of al-Muqtadir and brother of the two previous caliphs, al-Fadl was an obvious candidate for the throne. Tuzun instead chose al-Mustakfi (r. 944–946), a son of Caliph al-Muktafi (r. 902–908). The medieval sources report that al-Mustakfi and al-Fadl hated each other, and quarreled already during their stay in the Tahirid Palace as young princes. Not only were they members of two rival lines of succession, but their characters were diametrically opposed: though al-Fadl, like his father, was renowned for his piety, al-Mustakfi offended pious opinion by his association with the ayyarun militia—drawn from the poorer urban classes, they were often decried as troublemakers and suspected for their association with heterodox and sectarian groups like the Sufis—and his participation in 'vulgar' games. Once al-Mustakfi was enthroned, he sent his agents to capture al-Muti', but the latter had already gone into hiding, and the caliph had to satisfy himself with demolishing his house. This futile act only served to mark al-Fadl as a serious rival; on hearing of it, the veteran vizier, Ali ibn Isa, is said to have remarked that "This day he [al-Fadl] has been acknowledged heir to the throne."

=== Caliphate ===
==== Rise to the throne ====
The domains of the Buyid dynasty, controlling Iraq and large parts of Iran, and the other states of the Middle East in c. 970

In December 945, the Daylamite troops of the Buyid ruler Mu'izz al-Dawla (r. 945–967) seized Baghdad. Mu'izz al-Dawla became the de facto 'protector' of the Abbasid caliph, although the title of amir al-umara apparently passed to his older brother, Imad al-Dawla, who was reckoned as the chief Buyid emir. (Note: On Imad al-Dawla's death in 949, the title of amir al-umara passed to the middle brother, Rukn al-Dawla, while Mu'izz al-Dawla continued to govern Iraq and 'protect' the Caliph as his brother's deputy.) On 29 January 946 (or 9 March, according to other accounts), al-Mustakfi was deposed, and on the same day, Mu'izz al-Dawla raised al-Fadl to the caliphate, with the regnal name of al-Muti' li-'llah (lit. 'Obedient to God'). The sudden reappearance of al-Muti', and his rise to the throne, was apparently a surprise to contemporaries, and led to stories that he had conspired with the Buyids already since the time of al-Muktafi's accession.

Medieval sources tended to justify this change on religious grounds. The Buyids and their followers were Shi'a sympathizers, and two later chroniclers, Muhammad ibn Abd al-Malik al-Hamadhani (d. 1127) and Ibn al-Athir (d. 1233), report that Mu'izz al-Dawla toyed with the idea of deposing the Abbasids outright and installing an Alid on the throne of Baghdad, only to be dissuaded by his secretary, Abu Ja'far al-Saymari, who pointed out that in a clash between himself and a Shi'a caliph, the Daylamite soldiery were likely to side with the latter. This is clearly a later anachronistic interpolation, (Note: Al-Hamadhani names the Rassid Zaydi imam Abu'l-Hasan Muhammad ibn Yahya as the preferred candidate, and Ibn al-Athir asserts that it was the Isma'ili Fatimid caliph, al-Mu'izz li-Din Allah. Both are incorrect, since Abu'l-Hasan had died nine years earlier, and al-Mu'izz li-Din Allah only ascended the throne in 953.) and the historian John Donohue disclaims any religious motivation in al-Mustakfi's deposition. Other chroniclers offer different reasons, such as the caliph's intrigues with the Hamdanids or al-Fadl's emerging from hiding and inciting the Buyid ruler against his cousin, but the chief reason was likely simply that Mu'izz al-Dawla wished to have a caliph under his full control, with no external sources of support.

The deposed al-Mustakfi was blinded, apparently as a revenge act initiated by al-Muti', and spent the rest of his life as a prisoner in the caliphal palace, where he died in September 949.

==== Role and relations with the Buyids ====
Al-Muti' was a weak figure, for all intents and purposes a puppet ruler of the Buyid ruler of Iraq, first Mu'izz al-Dawla, and then his son, Izz al-Dawla (r. 967–978). As a result of his lack of real power, al-Muti' himself barely figures in the chronicles of his reign, and medieval historians generally considered his tenure as the lowest ebb of the Abbasid caliphate, an opinion shared by modern scholars as well.

"[The Buyids] were not out to overthrow the established order but to find a place in it and, like many of the Germanic leaders who assumed power in the Roman empire in the fifth century, they were more concerned to maintain the status quo and derive legitimacy from it than they were to destroy it."

— Historian Hugh Kennedy on the Buyids' retention of the Abbasid caliphate

In theory, the Buyids and all their officials in Iraq continued to act in the name of the Abbasid caliph, and all appointments and legal acts continued to be made in his name. In practice, al-Muti' was deprived of any meaningful authority. In exchange for being allowed to lead a comfortable and secure life in the vast caliphal palaces, he served to provide legitimacy to the upstart Buyid regime in the eyes of the Muslim world. The options of abolishing the caliphate or installing an Alid as caliph were quickly rejected, if they were ever seriously entertained: such an act would cause widespread opposition, another Sunni caliphate might easily be set up elsewhere, but a docile caliph under Buyid control would help maintain the obedience of the Sunni majority to the new regime, as well as lend its symbolic weight to the Buyids in their relations with the other Muslim princes. Furthermore, there was a lack of suitable Alid candidates: the last imam of the Twelver Shi'a, who represented the main strand of Shi'a followers in the Buyid domains, was held to have gone into occultation seventy years earlier, and Zaydi doctrine held that the imams had to seize power themselves if they were to be legitimate.

The Buyids quickly integrated themselves into the traditional Abbasid system and eagerly sought the legitimacy conferred by the caliph, in the form of honorific titles and diplomas of governorship, or in his signature in treaties. At the same time, al-Muti' was effectively reduced to a salaried state official, and his responsibility was curtailed to the oversight over the judiciary, religious institutions, and the affairs of the members of the wider Abbasid clan. The caliph's chief secretary was no longer termed 'vizier' (wazir), but merely 'secretary' (katib), and his role was limited to the management of the diwan al-khilafa, a department managing the caliph's properties, the formal conferment of titles and offices and certificates in the name of the caliph, and the appointment of judges and jurors. In reality, judicial appointments too were under the purview of the Buyid emir, but at least for the more senior ones, such as the chief qadi of Baghdad, the caliph was expected to provide his assent, the robe of honour and the requisite diploma. With one known exception, al-Muti' generally complied with the emir's appointments.

The Buyids kept a close watch on the caliph, especially during their periodic conflicts with the Hamdanids, lest he might try to defect to them, as al-Muttaqi had done. During the battles of summer 946, when the Hamdanids briefly occupied East Baghdad, he was kept under house arrest in a church in West Baghdad, and not released until he had sworn an oath of loyalty to the Buyids. Whenever Mu'izz al-Dawla campaigned against rebels south of Baghdad, al-Muti' was forced to accompany the Buyid ruler, lest he defect north to the Hamdanids. Conversely, when the Buyid amir al-umara campaigned against the Hamdanids in the north, al-Muti' was left behind in Baghdad. In 948/49, Ispahdost, Mu'izz al-Dawla's brother-in-law, was arrested on suspicion of conspiring with al-Muti' (or with an unnamed Alid).

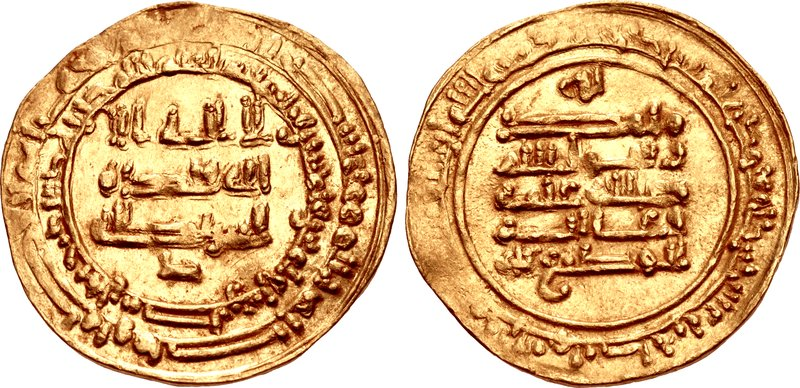
Gold dinar of the Ikhshidid ruler Abu al-Misk Kafur minted in 966 in Ramla, Palestine, in the name of al-Muti'

Upon taking power, Mu'izz al-Dawla distributed the former caliphal crown domains for the upkeep of the army, and al-Muti' had to content himself with a daily salary of 2,000 silver dirhams. When Basra was recovered from the Baridi family shortly after, he was assigned extensive possessions there, raising his income to 200,000 gold dinars per year. Although the general decline of Iraq later reduced his income by three quarters of its original value, this allowed the caliph to financially support members of the Abbasid clan in need, and to make rich gifts to the Kaaba. The income also sufficed for the construction of a series of pavilions in the caliphal palace grounds: the Peacock Palace (Dar al-Tawawis), the Octagon House (Dar al-Muthammana) and the Square House (Dar al-Murabba'a).

The troubled relations between the caliph and the Buyids gradually assumed a more regular and tranquil character: the Buyids at least formally respected the caliph's remaining responsibilities, and al-Muti' apparently accepted his subservient role, regained some freedom of action, and maintained cordial relations with Mu'izz al-Dawla. In 955/56, Mu'izz al-Dawla even appointed his 13-year-old son, the future Izz al-Dawla, as the caliph's chamberlain. The most notable exception to the good relationship between the caliph and the amir al-umara was the latter's attempt to rent out the appointment of chief qadi of Baghdad to Abdallah ibn Abi al-Shawarib for 200,000 dirhams per year between 961 and 963. Both Sunni and Shi'a scholars opposed this as illegal, and al-Muti' refused to sign the appointments made by Mu'izz al-Dawla during this period. This is also almost the only reference in the sources to al-Muti's activity in the religious or judicial sphere; otherwise, his reign is passed over in silence.

A positive corollary of this subservience was stability. Although of a sickly disposition, al-Muti' reigned as caliph for 29 Hijri years and four months, in stark contrast to his short-lived predecessors, and unlike them had to contend with remarkably few rival pretenders to the caliphate. A grandson of al-Muktafi rebelled in Armenia in 960 and claimed the caliphate as al-Mustajir Billah before being defeated by the local Sallarid rulers. In 968, Abu'l-Hasan Muhammad, a son of al-Mustakfi, who had fled to the Ikhshidid court in Egypt, gained considerable support in Iraq by hiding his identity and posing as the Mahdi (the Islamic messiah). The leading convert to his cause was a Buyid commander, the Turk Sübüktegin al-Ajami, who gave him protection and was preparing to mount a coup in his name, before his identity was uncovered and he was handed over to al-Muti'. The caliph did not severely punish him, other than ordering his nose cut off, thereby disqualifying him from the succession; although Abu'l-Hasan Muhammad eventually managed to escape, his hopes of seizing the throne were never realized, and the caliphal succession henceforth firmly remained with the line of al-Muqtadir.

==== Facing the Shi'a and Byzantine challenges ====
"The Sacred War would be incumbent on me if the world were in my hands, and if I had the management of the money and the troops. As things are, when all I have is a pittance, insufficient for my wants, and the world is in your hands and those of the provincial rulers, neither the Sacred War, nor the Pilgrimage, nor any other matter requiring the attention of the Sovereign is a concern of mine. All you can claim from me is the name which is uttered in the khutbah from your pulpits as a means of pacifying your subjects; and if you want me to renounce that privilege too, I am prepared to do so and leave everything to you."

— al-Muti's reply to Izz al-Dawla's demand to finance the jihad against the Byzantines

Outside the Buyid domains, on the other hand, the Abbasid caliph's authority over the wider Muslim world declined. Until the conclusion of a peace with the Buyids in 955, the Samanids of Khurasan refused to acknowledge his caliphate, and, in the west, the rival Isma'ili Shi'a Fatimid Caliphate was growing more and more powerful, conquering Egypt in 969 and beginning its expansion into the Levant. Even in Baghdad, the pro-Shi'a sympathies of the Buyids meant that Shi'a influence, although numerically small, was growing. Shi'a practices were introduced in the city, such as the ritual condemnation of the Umayyad caliph Mu'awiya, or the celebration of the Ghadir Khumm festival, attested since 963. Alids assumed the leadership of the annual Hajj caravans, and street clashes between Sunni and Shi'a partisans are recorded in several years during this period.

At the same time, al-Muti' played a leading role as a mediator in the formation of an anti-Fatimid coalition that included the Qarmatians under al-Hasan al-A'sam and the Hamdanid ruler of Mosul, Abu Taghlib, with the backing of the Buyids. This coalition managed to stop the Fatimid expansion into the Levant until 973/74. In the process, the Qarmatians recognized al-Muti's suzerainty in the khutbah (Friday sermon) and their coins, and denounced the Fatimids as impostors. In 951, when the Qarmatians returned the Black Stone to the Kaaba in Mecca, whence they had taken it in 930, al-Muti' is rumoured to have paid them 30,000 gold dinars as the Stone's ransom.

Another source of danger was the Byzantine advance against the Hamdanids in Upper Mesopotamia and northern Syria. In the 960s, the Byzantines broke the centuries-old border at the Taurus Mountains and seized Cilicia and Antioch, reducing the Hamdanid emirate of Aleppo to a tributary vassal in the process. In 972, the Byzantine raids reached Nisibis, Amida, and Edessa. Muslim refugees from these cities flooded Baghdad and clamoured for protection. Unwilling and unable to help, Izz al-Dawla pointed them to al-Muti', since the jihad was still formally the caliph's responsibility. Bereft of any military or financial resources, al-Muti' was powerless to help them, and his prestige suffered accordingly; the riots engulfed the Shi'a quarter of Karkh, which went up in flames. Izz al-Dawla used the opportunity to pressure al-Muti' into selling off his valuables and providing 400,000 dirhams, ostensibly to be used to employ soldiers against the Byzantines. Al-Muti' protested in a much-quoted letter, but had no option but to comply; the profligate Buyid ruler soon squandered the money. This act proved to be a costly political mistake for Izz al-Dawla, further alienating Sunni sympathies in Baghdad, where his control grew even more tenuous.

==== Abdication and death ====
Over the years, Izz al-Dawla increasingly alienated his Turkic soldiery, under their commander Sabuktakin, culminating in a failed assassination attempt on the latter. The Turks had also gained the support of the Sunni populace in Baghdad after putting down the riots in 972. As a result, on 1 August 974, Sabuktakin seized control of Baghdad from Izz al-Dawla.

When the coup occurred, al-Muti' left Baghdad with members of the Buyid clan, but Sabuktakin forced him back and confined him to his palace. Of advanced years, and with his right side paralyzed following a stroke in 970, al-Muti' was induced to abdicate with his health as a pretext, and was replaced by his son Abd al-Karim, as al-Ta'i (r. 974–991), on 5 August. This was the first father-to-son succession of the caliphate since al-Muktafi in 902.

Sabuktakin had himself appointed amir al-umara by the new caliph, and left Baghdad to campaign against the Buyids, accompanied by both al-Muti' and al-Ta'i. Al-Muti' died on the way, at Dayr al-Aqul, on 12 October 974. He was buried at the mausoleum of his paternal grandmother, Shaghab, in the Baghdad quarter of al-Rusafa, where his brother al-Radi had also been buried.

== Sources ==
- Bowen, Harold (1928). The Life and Times of ʿAlí Ibn ʿÍsà, ‘The Good Vizier’. Cambridge: Cambridge University Press.
- Brett, Michael (2001). The Rise of the Fatimids: The World of the Mediterranean and the Middle East in the Fourth Century of the Hijra, Tenth Century CE. The Medieval Mediterranean. Vol. 30. Leiden, Boston, Köln: Brill. ISBN 90-04-11741-5.
- Busse, Heribert (2004) [1969]. Chalif und Grosskönig – Die Buyiden im Irak (945–1055) [Caliph and Great King – The Buyids in Iraq (945–1055)] (in German). Würzburg: Ergon Verlag. ISBN 3-89913-005-7.
- Cahen, Cl. (1960). "Buwayhids or Būyids". In Gibb, H. A. R.; Kramers, J. H.; Lévi-Provençal, E.; Schacht, J.; Lewis, B. & Pellat, Ch. (eds.). The Encyclopaedia of Islam, Second Edition. Volume I: A–B. Leiden: E. J. Brill. pp. 1350–1357. OCLC 495469456.
- Donohue, John J. (2003). The Buwayhid Dynasty in Iraq 334 H./945 to 403 H./1012: Shaping Institutions for the Future. Leiden and Boston: Brill. ISBN 90-04-12860-3.
- Güner, Ahmet (2006). "Mutî'-Lillâh". TDV Encyclopedia of Islam, Vol. 31 (Muhammedi̇yye – Münâzara) (in Turkish). Istanbul: Presidency of Religious Affairs, Centre for Islamic Studies. pp. 401–402. ISBN 978-975-389-458-6.
- Hanne, Eric J. (2007). Putting the Caliph in His Place: Power, Authority, and the Late Abbasid Caliphate. Madison, New Jersey: Fairleigh Dickinson University Press. ISBN 978-0-8386-4113-2.
- Kennedy, Hugh (2004) [1986]. The Prophet and the Age of the Caliphates: The Islamic Near East from the 6th to the 11th Century (Second ed.). Harlow: Longman. ISBN 978-0-582-40525-7.
- Le Strange, Guy (1922). Baghdad During the Abbasid Caliphate. From Contemporary Arabic and Persian Sources (Second ed.). Oxford: Clarendon Press.
- Özaydin, Abdülkerim (2006). "Müstekfî-Bi̇llâh". TDV Encyclopedia of Islam, Vol. 32 (el-Münci̇d – Nasi̇h) (in Turkish). Istanbul: Presidency of Religious Affairs, Centre for Islamic Studies. pp. 139–140. ISBN 978-975-389-454-8.
- Tor, Deborah (2014). "ʿAyyār". In Fleet, Kate; Krämer, Gudrun; Matringe, Denis; Nawas, John; Rowson, Everett (eds.). Encyclopaedia of Islam (3rd ed.). Brill Online. doi:10.1163/1573-3912_ei3_COM_24259. ISSN 1873-9830.
- Zetterstéen, K. V. & Bosworth, C. E. (1993). "al-Muṭīʿ Li 'llāh". In Bosworth, C. E.; van Donzel, E.; Heinrichs, W. P. & Pellat, Ch. (eds.). The Encyclopaedia of Islam, Second Edition. Volume VII: Mif–Naz. Leiden: E. J. Brill. p. 799. doi:10.1163/1573-3912_islam_SIM_5674. ISBN 978-90-04-09419-2.

al-Muti' Abbasid dynasty Born: 913/14 Died: 12 October 974
Sunni Islam titles
Preceded by al-Mustakfi	Caliph of the Abbasid Caliphate; 29 January/9 March 946 – 5 August 974	Succeeded by al-Ta'i
