= Alptakin =

Turkic ruler

Alptakin (also known as Aftakin) was a Turkish military officer of the Buyids, who participated, and eventually came to lead, an unsuccessful rebellion against them in Iraq from 973 to 975. Fleeing west with 300 followers, he exploited the power vacuum in Syria to capture several cities, including Damascus. For the next three years, Alptakin withstood attempts by the Fatimid Caliphate to capture Damascus, until he was defeated and captured by Caliph al-Aziz Billah. Taken to Egypt and incorporated into the Fatimid army, he was poisoned by the vizier Ibn Killis shortly after this.

== Early life and rebellion against the Buyids ==
He was a freedman of the Buyid ruler of Iraq, Izz al-Dawla Bakhtiyar. Nothing further is known about him until 973, when he joined the rebellion of the Turkish officer Sabuktakin, who managed to occupy Baghdad and many other parts of Iraq. The Turkish rebels under Sabuktakin then besieged Wasit, where Izz al-Dawla had fortified himself. Sabuktakin died during the siege, and Alptakin was shortly chosen as the new leader of the Turks. Meanwhile, a Buyid army under Izz al-Dawla's cousin Adud al-Dawla was marching towards Iraq, and by 975 managed to completely defeat the rebels at the Diyala River.

== Invasion of Syria and war with the Fatimids ==
Map of Early Islamic Syria and its provinces

After his defeat at the hands of the Buyids, along with c. 300 of his followers, Alptakin fled to Syria, where they managed to capture Hims. Alptakin then allied himself with the Qarmatians, and in the winter of 975 invaded the Mediterranean coast and laid siege to Fatimid city of Sidon. He shortly managed to capture the city, resulting in the massacre of 4,000 Fatimid troops. He then captured Tiberias, and marched towards to Damascus, which he took without much resistance. In the meantime, the Byzantine emperor John I Tzimiskes was undertaking campaigns in Syria, which made Alptakin surrender his lands to John, but through diplomacy, he prevented the Byzantines from attempting to annex the city.

The Fatimid caliph al-Aziz Billah then sent an army under his general Jawhar, who managed to reconquer the Mediterranean coast and reach as far as Damascus, which laid siege to in July 976.

The Qarmatians reacted by sending an army to aid Alptakin—according to some sources, Alptakin himself appealed to the Qarmatians for aid—forcing Jawhar to lift the siege in January 977. The allies pursued Jawhar to Ramla, where they were joined by the Banu Tayy Bedouin; Jawhar was defeated in a pitched battle at the Yarqon River, and was forced to abandon Ramla and retreat to Ascalon. The Qarmatians entered Ramla on 12 March 977. The combined army of Alptakin and the Qarmatians then besieged Ascalon, where the Fatimid army had fled to. After a long siege which lasted until April 978, the starving Fatimid army agreed to make a peace treaty: in addition to Damascus, Alptakin would receive Palestine, while the northern border of the Fatimid domain was set at Gaza. To make the treaty more palatable to the Fatimids, Alptakin agreed to recognize the Fatimid caliph as his suzerain, although this was a purely nominal gesture: Alptakin would retain all revenue collected from the territories under his control.

In 978, Izz al-Dawla, whose territories had been conquered by Adud al-Dawla, fled along with his two brothers and other Dailamite followers to Damascus, where they were warmly received by Alptakin, who incorporated the Dailamites into his army. Meanwhile, a new Fatimid army under al-Aziz himself was marching towards Damascus, and a battle ensued between the Turks and the Fatimids near Ramla; Alptakin charged the left wing of the Fatimids, killing many. However, the Fatimids turned the tide of the battle by making a counter-attack on the centre and right wing of Alptakin's army, killing c. 20,000 of his men.

Alptakin managed to flee from the battlefield to the desert, where he almost died of thirst, but was found by the leader of the Tayy tribe and an old friend of his, Mufarrij ibn Daghfal ibn al-Jarrah. Alptakin was brought to the latter's home, where he was treated with honour. During his stay the latter's home, however, Mufarrij betrayed him and gave him to al-Aziz in exchange for 100,000 gold dinars.

Alptakin was then taken to the Fatimid capital of Cairo, where he was honourably treated by al-Aziz, who incorporated Alptakin along with his Turkish followers into the Fatimid army. However, Alptakin was later poisoned by al-Aziz's vizier, Yaqub ibn Killis.

== Sources ==
- Canard, Marius (1965). "D̲j̲arrāḥids". In Lewis, B.; Pellat, Ch. & Schacht, J. (eds.). The Encyclopaedia of Islam, Second Edition. Volume II: C–G. Leiden: E. J. Brill. pp. 482–485. OCLC 495469475.
- Gil, Moshe (1997) [1983]. A History of Palestine, 634–1099. Translated by Ethel Broido. Cambridge: Cambridge University Press. ISBN 0-521-59984-9.
- Kennedy, Hugh (2004) [1986]. The Prophet and the Age of the Caliphates: The Islamic Near East from the 6th to the 11th Century (Second ed.). Harlow: Longman. ISBN 978-0-582-40525-7.
- Romane, Julian (2015). Byzantium Triumphant. Pen and Sword Books. ISBN 978-1473845701.
