= Izz al-Dawla =

Buyid Emir of Iraq and Amir al-umara (967–978)

- Amir al-umara
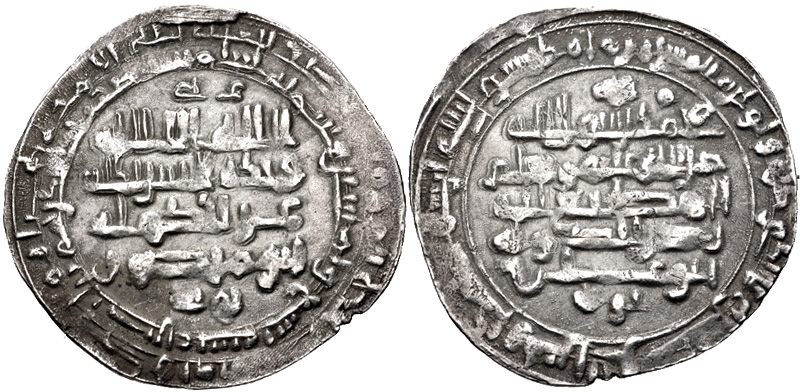
- Coin minted during the reign of Izz al-Dawla

Buyid Emir of Iraq
- Reign: 967–978
- Predecessor: Mu'izz al-Dawla
- Successor: Adud al-Dawla
- Born: 943; Ahvaz, Abbasid Caliphate
- Died: 978; Iraq, Abbasid Caliphate
- Spouse: Daughter of Lashkarwarz
- Issue: Marzuban ibn Bakhtiyar; Salar; Unnamed princess
- House: Buyid
- Father: Mu'izz al-Dawla
- Religion: Shia Islam

Bakhtiyar (Persian: بختیار, died 978), better known by his laqab of Izz al-Dawla (Arabic: عز الدولة, romanized: ʿIzz ad-Dawla, lit. 'Glory of the Dynasty'), was the Buyid amir of Iraq (967–978).

== Early life ==
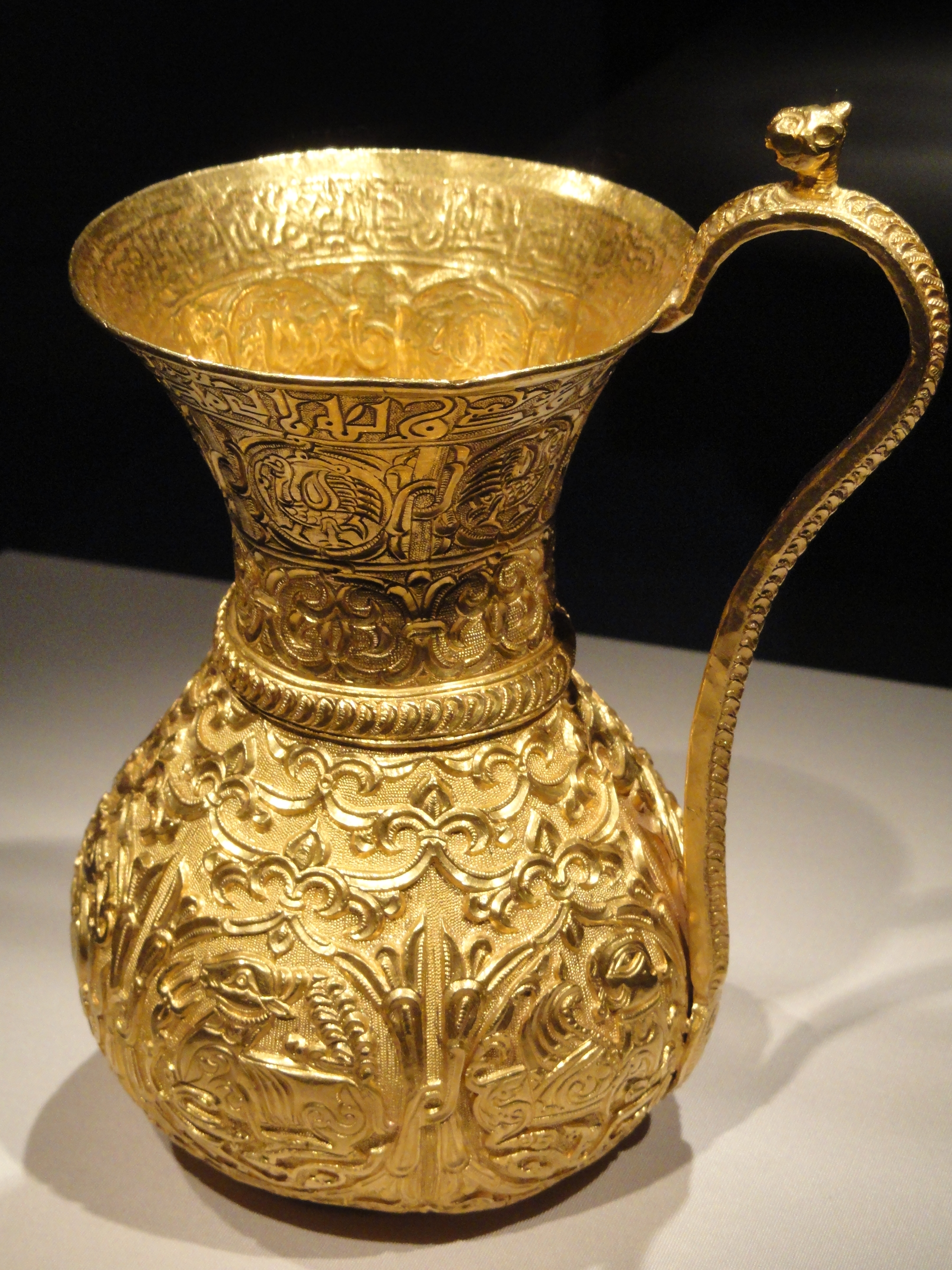
Gold Ewer inscribed with the name and titles of Abu Mansur Izz al-Amir al-Bakhtiyar ibn Muizz al-Dawla

Izz al-Dawla was born as Bakhtiyar, and was the son of Mu'izz al-Dawla. He also had three brothers named Sanad al-Dawla, Marzuban and Abu Ishaq Ibrahim. Bakhtiyar, during his early life, married a daughter of the Dailamite officer Lashkarwarz.

In the spring of 955, Mu'izz al-Dawla became very ill and decided to name his son as his successor. Five years later, the caliph officially recognized this by granting Bakhtiyar the title of "Izz al-Dawla". During his father's military expeditions, Izz al-Dawla ruled in Baghdad. Mu'izz al-Dawla died in 967, leaving behind several pieces of advice for his son. He recommended keeping the services of the Turkish commander Sebük-Tegin, respecting the wishes of the Turks, recognizing his uncle Rukn al-Dawla, who ruled northern Persia, as senior amir, and respecting his cousin 'Adud al-Dawla, who ruled from Fars. He also gave a strategy for dealing with the Hamdanid emir of Mosul, Abu Taghlib.

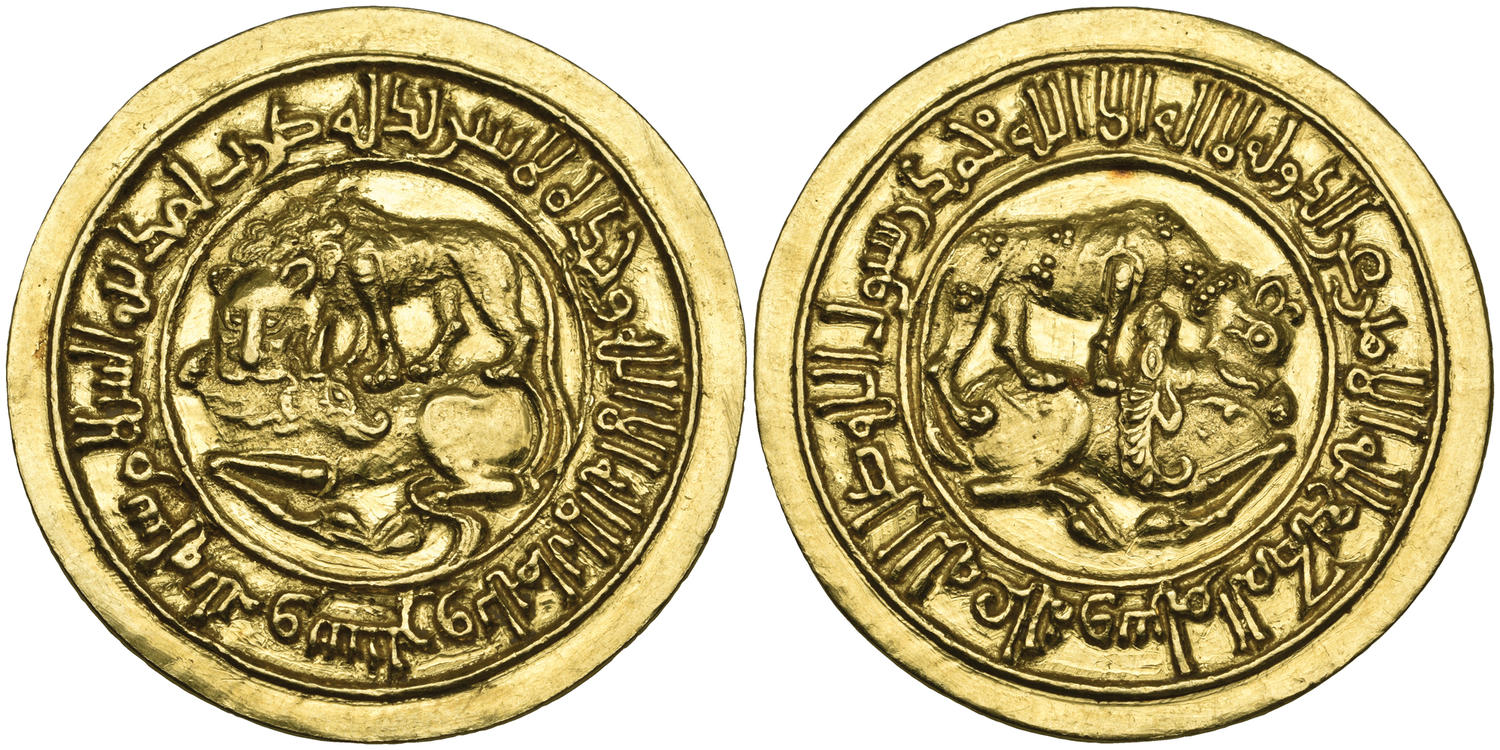
Gold five-dinar coin of Izz ad-Dawla (AD 974/5); it depicts a lion killing a deer and a leopard killing an ibex.

== Reign ==
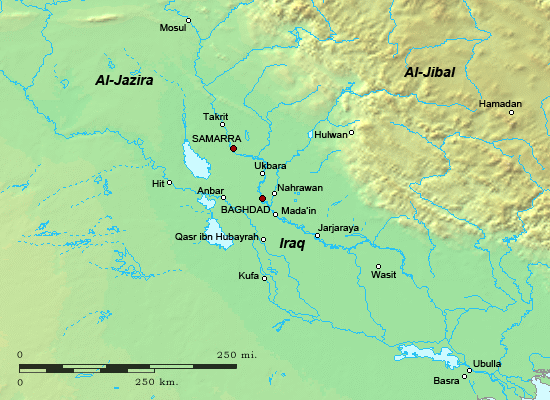
Map of Iraq in the 9th–10th centuries

In 970, Izz al-Dawla, in order to end the hostilities between the Dailamites and Turks in his army, began to make several marriages with high ranking Turks to strengthen the Dailamite-Turkic relationship; his son Marzuban ibn Bakhtiyar married a daughter of Bukhtakin Azadruwayh, and his other son Salar married a daughter of Baktijur.

Izz al-Dawla continued his father's policy of fighting the Shahinids who ruled the Iraqi marshlands, but he was unable to overcome them. At the same time, he ignored the border with the Byzantine Empire, considering this to be a matter for the caliph to handle. When the Byzantines under John I Tzimisces overran much of northern Mesopotamia in 971, he did not even return to Baghdad. The person who took it upon himself to defend Iraq was Sebük-Tegin, who felt himself increasingly alienated from the Buyid. Two years later, Izz al-Dawla appointed Ibn Baqiyya as his vizier.

Izz al-Dawla also had financial problems; in 973 he invaded the Amirate of Mosul, against the advice his father had left him. The campaign was a disaster; the Hamdanids under Abu Taghlib marched on Baghdad, while Sebük-Tegin was probably secretly supporting them. The Buyid amir then tried to solve his financial difficulties by seizing the Turkish fiefs, most of which were in Khuzestan. At the same time, he dismissed Sebük-Tegin from his post. The Turk revolted, forcing Izz al-Dawla to entrench himself in Wasit. He rejected Sebük-Tegin's offer to relinquish Baghdad in exchange for southern Iraq. The Turk then marched on Wasit, and laid siege to the city.

At this point, Rukn al-Dawla ordered 'Adud al-Dawla to march on Wasit and relieve Izz al-Dawla. The choice of 'Adud al-Dawla was somewhat curious: he had earlier advocated the removal of Izz al-Dawla due to the latter's perceived incompetence, and had granted asylum to a brother of the Iraqi amir that had launched a failed rebellion in Basra. Despite this, 'Adud al-Dawla complied with the order, although he traveled as slowly as possible in order to give Sebük-Tegin the chance to overpower Wasit.

Izz al-Dawla, however, managed to hold out, and Sebük-Tegin died during the siege. 'Adud al-Dawla therefore eventually decided to restore him in Baghdad. Shortly afterwards however, a revolt launched by Izz al-Dawla's Dailamite mercenaries gave 'Adud al-Dawla the opportunity to overthrow his cousin. Having done so, he would have ruled Iraq directly, but Rukn al-Dawla vehemently opposed this. Izz al-Dawla was therefore made 'Adud al-Dawla's viceroy to Iraq. The latter's departure for Shiraz prompted Izz al-Dawla to immediately revoke his subservience.

=== Civil war and death ===
Rukn al-Dawla died in 976, throwing the Buyid empire into chaos. Izz al-Dawla refused to recognize 'Adud al-Dawla's succession to the position of senior amir. He took new titles for himself, and married one of the caliph's daughters, signifying the caliph's assent to his policy. 'Adud al-Dawla then prepared to invade Iraq. Despite having prepared his army and his allies, Izz al-Dawla was defeated in Khuzestan in 977 and was forced to retreat to Wasit. There he raised a new army, but the two cousins then entered into negotiations. After a long while, Izz al-Dawla was granted freedom of passage to Syria, in exchange for a promise not to ally with the Hamdanids. When he broke that agreement, hostilities were resumed. Both Izz al-Dawla and the Hamdanids were defeated in Samarra in the spring of 978, and the Buyid was captured. He was put to death soon after with 'Adud al-Dawla's consent.

== Sources ==
- Amedroz, Henry F.; Margoliouth, David S., eds. (1921). The Eclipse of the 'Abbasid Caliphate. Original Chronicles of the Fourth Islamic Century, Vol. V: The concluding portion of The Experiences of Nations by Miskawaihi, Vol. II: Reigns of Muttaqi, Mustakfi, Muzi and Ta'i. Oxford: Basil Blackwell.
- Bosworth, C. E. (1975). "Iran under the Būyids". In Frye, Richard N. (ed.). The Cambridge History of Iran: From the Arab Invasion to the Saljuqs. Vol. 4. Cambridge: Cambridge University Press. pp. 250–305. ISBN 0-521-20093-8.
- Donohue, John J. (2003). The Buwayhid Dynasty in Iraq 334 H./945 to 403 H./1012: Shaping Institutions for the Future. Leiden and Boston: Brill. ISBN 90-04-12860-3.
- Kennedy, Hugh (2004) [1986]. The Prophet and the Age of the Caliphates: The Islamic Near East from the 6th to the 11th Century (Second ed.). Harlow: Longman. ISBN 978-0-582-40525-7.
- Nagel, Tilman (1990). "BUYIDS". BUYIDS – Encyclopaedia Iranica. Encyclopaedia Iranica, Vol. IV, Fasc. 6. London: Routledge & Kegan Paul. pp. 578–586.

Preceded by Mu'izz al-Dawla	Buyid Amir (in Iraq); 967–978	Succeeded by 'Adud al-Dawla
