= Mu'izz al-Dawla =

1st Buyid emir of Iraq from 945 to 967

- Emir of Iraq; Amir al-umara
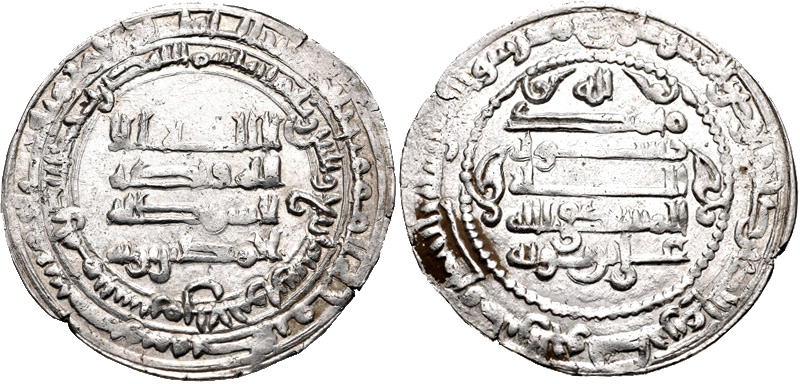
- Coin of Mu'izz al-Dawla
- Reign: 945–967
- Successor: Izz al-Dawla
- Born: 915; Daylam, Abbasid Caliphate
- Died: April 8, 967 (aged 52); Iraq, Buyid dynasty
- Issue: Abu Ishaq Ibrahim; Izz al-Dawla; Sanad al-Dawla; Marzuban; Zubayda; Abu Tahir
Names
- Ahmad ibn Buya
- House: Buyid
- Father: Buya
- Religion: Twelver Shia Islam

Ahmad ibn Buya (Persian: احمد بن بویه, died April 8, 967), after 945 better known by his laqab of Mu'izz al-Dawla (Arabic: معز الدولة البويهي, "Fortifier of the Dynasty"), was the first of the Buyid emirs of Iraq, ruling from 945 until his death.

The son of a Daylamite fisherman who had converted to Islam, Ahmad ibn Buya was born in the mountainous region of Daylam, and by 928, he along with his two brothers served the Daylamite military leader Makan ibn Kaki. However, they quickly changed their allegiance to the Ziyarid ruler Mardavij; some years later they rebelled against him after finding out that he planned to murder one of them. In 935/6, Ahmad ibn Buya unsuccessfully invaded Kerman, and was later sent to Istakhr. From there he started making incursions into Khuzestan and later Iraq; by 945, he was officially recognized as the ruler of Iraq and Khuzestan and had received the title of "Mu'izz al-Dawla" from the Caliph, while his two brothers were the rulers of other territories, having also received titles from the Caliph.

Throughout his rule, Mu'izz al-Dawla was devoted to conflicts with other dynasties for control over Iraq—in 946, an important battle took place in Baghdad between Mu'izz al-Dawla and the Hamdanid amir Nasir al-Dawla, which lasted several months, with Mu'izz al-Dawla emerging victorious. Mu'izz al-Dawla also fought against the Batihah amirate several times, but was unable to decisively defeat it. Mu'izz al-Dawla also had problems with some of his Daylamite kinsmen, who would sometimes rebel against him, the most dangerous instance being the rebellion of Ruzbahan from 955 to 957. By Mu'izz al-Dawla's death in 967, he had defeated all his foes and was the unchallenged ruler of Iraq. He was succeeded by his son Izz al-Dawla.

== Family and early career ==
Ahmad was the son of Buya, a Daylamite fisherman from Lahijan, who had left his Zoroastrian faith and converted to Islam. Ahmad had two older brothers named 'Ali and Hasan, and a sister named Kama.

Around 928, Ahmad's brother Ali joined the service of Makan ibn Kaki, who was the Samanid governor of Ray. 'Ali then managed to gain military positions for Ahmad and their other brother, Hasan. At the time, Ahmad was about thirteen years old. When Makan attacked his Samanid overlords and was subsequently defeated by the Ziyarid prince Mardavij, the brothers transferred their allegiance to the latter. In the following years, 'Ali repudiated his subservience to Mardavij and, after some time, managed to create an empire in Fars, where Ahmad distinguished himself in battle.

In 935 or 936, 'Ali sent Ahmad to Kerman with the task of conquering that province from the Banu Ilyas. Ahmad overran much of Kerman, but encountered resistance from the Baluchis and Arab Qafs, receiving a wound to the head and losing a hand and several fingers on the other. Direct Buyid control over Kerman was not established, resulting in 'Ali's recall of Ahmad. The latter was then sent to Istakhr to await further orders.

Ahmad's next opportunity to expand the possessions of the Buyids came when the Baridis requested help from 'Ali. The Baridis, who ruled in Khuzestan, were nominally subordinate to the Abbasid Caliphate, but were attempting to establish their independence. Ahmad was sent by 'Ali to the area; he succeeded in uprooting the authority of the Baridis and taking control of that province.

== Invasion and conquest of Iraq ==
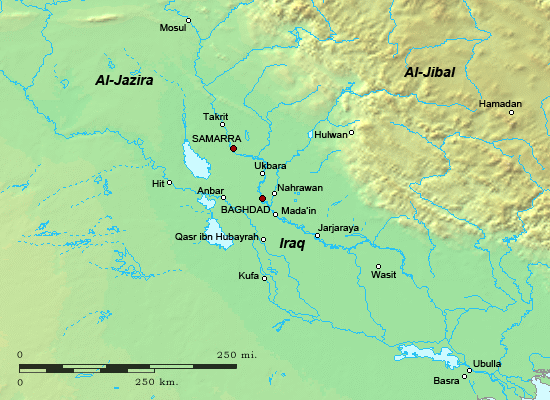
Map of Iraq in the 9th–10th centuries

From Khuzestan he launched several campaigns into Iraq, where the Caliphate was in serious internal disarray. These expeditions were on his own initiative; Ali had not ordered them and did not send support for them. In 944, Ahmad captured Wasit, but was met by an Abbasid army near Al-Mada'in under the de facto ruler of the Caliphate, Tuzun. Ahmad eventually emerged victorious during the battle, and then marched towards Baghdad, but was forced to retreat back to Ahvaz on July 28 after Tuzun destroyed the bridge to Baghdad. In 945, an Abbasid officer, Yanal Kushah, joined Ahmad, who shortly invaded Iraq again.

Ahmad then gained control of Baghdad on December 19, 945 without a struggle. He took charge of the administration of the Caliphate by taking the position of amir al-umara'. The Caliph Al-Mustakfi also gave him the honorific title of "Mu'izz al-Dawla" ("Glorifier of the State"). 'Ali was given the title of "'Imad al-Dawla" ("Support of the State"); another of Ahmad's brothers, Hasan, who had gained control of northern Persia, gained the title of "Rukn al-Dawla" ("Pillar of the State"). Mu'izz had brought many of his Daylamite soldiers to Iraq, whom he settled there. He also brought many prominent Persian statesmen, including Abu'l-Fadl al-Abbas ibn Fasanjas from the Fasanjas family, who served as the financial minister of Basra.

Despite the fact that Mu'izz al-Dawla had taken control of Iraq by himself, he remained subordinate to 'Imad al-Dawla, who ruled in Shiraz. Coins bearing 'Imad al-Dawla's name in addition to his own were made. His title of amir al-umara', which in theory made him the senior amir of the Buyids, meant little in reality and was soon claimed by 'Imad al-Dawla. Although he maintained a certain level of independence, he was largely subordinate to 'Imad al-Dawla.

== First war with the Hamdanids ==
=== Background ===
News of this event was received negatively by the Hamdanid amir Nasir al-Dawla, who ruled over Mosul and the districts of the eastern Jazira. Nasir al-Dawla had previously controlled Baghdad in 942 and he still entertained hopes of regaining the city.

Nasir al-Dawla had reason to be confident that he could defeat Mu'izz al-Dawla if he made an attempt to capture Baghdad. His army had been bolstered by the arrival of numerous Turkish soldiers who had fled from Baghdad just before Mu'izz al-Dawla's entrance into the capital, and he was much more familiar with the territory between Mosul and Baghdad than his rival was. Mu'izz al-Dawla, on the other hand, was on less secure ground; Baghdad was in a sorry state thanks to years of mismanagement and he was hamstrung by its numerous financial and military problems. Nasir al-Dawla furthermore gained a pretext for war when in January 946 Mu'izz al-Dawla deposed and blinded the caliph al-Mustakfi and replaced him with the more obedient al-Muti'. As a result, Nasir al-Dawla took a belligerent tone with the Buyids: he withheld the payment of tribute to Baghdad, refused to recognize al-Muti' as caliph and continued to mint coins in al-Mustakfi's name.

=== Initial hostilities ===
It quickly became clear that the two amirs would be unable to work out an agreement with each other. In February 946, Mu'izz al-Dawla sent an army under the command of Musa Fayadhah and Yanal Kushah to Ukbara, in preparation for a campaign to conquer Mosul. The expedition was terminated, however, when Yanal Kushah suddenly attacked Musa and deserted to the Hamdanids. Nasir al-Dawla responded to this act of aggression by leading his army, which included a number of Turks, to Samarra the following month. Mu'izz al-Dawla similarly gathered his forces and departed from Baghdad with the caliph al-Muti' for Ukbara.

While stationed at Samarra, Nasir al-Dawla sent his brother Jubayr to sneak around the Buyid army and head south to Baghdad. When Jubayr arrived at the city, he was welcomed by the citizens and by Mu'izz al-Dawla's former secretary Muhammad ibn Shirzad, who declared his allegiance to the Hamdanids and administered the affairs of Baghdad on their behalf. Nasir al-Dawla then decided to head for Baghdad himself. Leaving his cousin al-Husayn ibn Sa'id in the field to distract Mu'izz al-Dawla, he headed south and reached western Baghdad on April 15, and though he was forced to destroy his baggage when a number of Daylamites threatened to seize it, he and his forces were able to gain control of the city.

When Mu'izz al-Dawla learned that he had lost Baghdad, he gathered his Daylamite soldiers, who had been busy plundering Tikrit and Samarra, and headed back to the city. When he arrived, he found that Nasir al-Dawla had crossed the Tigris and set up camp outside the Shammasiyyah quarter of eastern Baghdad; he therefore dug in on the western side of the city, and the two sides prepared for fighting.

=== Stalemate ===
For the next three months, control of Baghdad was divided between the Hamdanids and Buyids, with the Tigris dividing the two. On the Hamdanid side, Nasir al-Dawla promoted Ibn Shirzad to serve as one of his chief commanders, while on the western side, Abu Ja'far Saymari, the chief secretary of Mu'izz al-Dawla, managed the Buyid war effort.

Both sides were clearly determined to take permanent control of the city, and the battle quickly turned into a stalemate. Combat took place in multiple locations throughout Baghdad, with both the Hamdanid and Buyid forces launching offensive sorties against each other. Neither side, however was able to generate a victory large enough to win control of both halves of the city. Getting troops across the Tigris successfully was a challenge, and even if an army managed to make it to the opposite shore, they were usually forced to retreat in short order.

Control of the Tigris was a major objective for both sides. The Hamdanid and Buyid armies both built zabzabs or small riverboats and used these to launch attacks on each other. Each day, Ibn Shirzad led a number of zabzabs filled with Turks up and down the Tigris, and they shot arrows at the Daylamites stationed on the western side of the city. Mu'izz al-Dawla also constructed a fleet of zabzabs, and his troops used these to battle the Hamdanid forces patrolling the river.

On the eastern side, Nasir al-Dawla attempted to legitimize his seizure of the city by re-issuing the coinage of 942–943, from when he had last been in control of Baghdad. At least part of the population accepted his claims and supported him throughout the fighting. Ibn Shirzad was also able to augment the ranks of the Hamdanid forces by enlisting local citizens and criminals, and they participated in attacks on Mu'izz al-Dawla's Daylamite troops.

The economy of Baghdad suffered greatly throughout the fighting. Both sides seized the produce of local cultivators to feed their troops. Eastern Baghdad was able to avoid any serious shortages thanks to shipments flowing down from Mosul, but the western side was subjected to a blockade for the duration of the conflict. Nasir al-Dawla's forces prevented civilians on the western side from crossing to the eastern, while a number of allied Arab tribes surrounded western Baghdad and cut off the flow of supplies. The blockade was effective and soon shortages were rampant on the Buyid side; the price of bread soared to more than six times what it was selling for on the eastern side of the river, and was sometimes not available at all. Starving people were reduced to eating grass and carrion, and several women were executed for acts of cannibalism.

=== Buyid victory ===
By July 945, with no end to the battle in sight and with the blockade making supplies increasingly scarce, Mu'izz al-Dawla was giving serious thought to abandoning western Baghdad and retreating to al-Ahwaz. He eventually decided to make one final attempt to take the eastern side, and if the effort failed he would give the order to withdraw. He gave orders to his chief secretary Saymari to cross to the eastern bank with a number of handpicked Daylamites, while he himself would attempt to distract the Hamdanid forces with a ruse.

The plan was carried out on the night of August 1. Mu'izz al-Dawla led a number of men north, instructing them to light torches and blast trumpets along the way. The Hamdanid army, seeing his movements, moved north as well to prevent him from crossing the river. Saymari and his soldiers were therefore free to cross to the eastern side and began to do so. When the Hamdanid army realized what was happening, they sent a number of men in zabzabs to stop him, and a fierce fight broke out. Eventually the Daylamites were victorious and the Hamdanid forces were pushed back to the Shammasiyyah gate at the northeastern corner of the city.

As the Daylamites spread throughout eastern Baghdad, the Hamdanid army began to fall apart in disorder. Nasir al-Dawla, realizing that he was in danger of losing the city, ordered Ibn Shirzad to take command of the troops and push the Daylamites back across the river. Ibn Shirzad set out, but when he attempted to convince the panicking soldiers to regroup he was unable to do so and therefore decided to flee. Nasir al-Dawla then realized that the fight was lost and joined the retreat; the Hamdanid forces withdrew from Baghdad and allowed the Buyids to take control of the city.

Eastern Baghdad, meanwhile, remained in a state of turmoil. The Daylamite army occupied the eastern quarters of the city and began retaliating against the population for their support of the Hamdanids during the fighting. Ignoring an order by Mu'izz al-Dawla to refrain from pillaging, they began looting, set fire to houses and killed a number of civilians including Ali ibn Isa ibn al-Jarrah. Many of the residents fled in fear and attempted to head north to Ukbara, but died along the way in the summer heat. The chaos ceased only when Saymari executed several pillagers and sent out patrols to reestablish order.

=== Aftermath and war against minor rulers ===
Following their expulsion from Baghdad, Nasir al-Dawla, Ibn Shirzad and the Hamdanid army proceeded up the Tigris to Ukbara to regroup. After they arrived, Nasir al-Dawla sent an envoy to Mu'izz al-Dawla to sue for peace. Mu'izz al-Dawla agreed to the terms, and the war between the two sides came to an end. Mu'izz al-Dawla agreed to recognize the Hamdanid as ruler of the territory from Tikrit northwards, and to release him from the obligation of transmitting tax revenues from Mosul and the Diyar Bakr district. In exchange, Nasir al-Dawla was made responsible for forwarding the tax proceeds of Ikhshidid Egypt and Syria on to Baghdad, and promised to regularly send supplies to the city which were to be exempt from any taxes; in addition, he agreed to recognize al-Muti' as the legitimate caliph.

The Turkish mercenaries in the Hamdanid army, who were vehemently opposed to Mu'izz al-Dawla's continued occupation of Baghdad, were not informed that Nasir al-Dawla was seeking peace with the Buyids. When they learned that the two amirs had agreed to a treaty, they rebelled against Nasir al-Dawla and compelled him to flee. Nasir al-Dawla was forced to call on Mu'izz al-Dawla for assistance, and a Buyid army under the command of Saymari was sent to quell the Turks and enforce the treaty. Saymari defeated the rebels and confirmed Nasir al-Dawla in his position, but also confiscated a number of supplies and took a son of Nasir al-Dawla as a hostage to ensure that he would abide by the terms of the peace; he then returned to Baghdad.

Mu'izz al-Dawla now focused on the Baridis, who still controlled Basra and Wasit. He managed to defeat them and annex their lands in 947. Their defeat marked the end of major fighting.

Conflict between the Buyids and Hamdanids was renewed in 948, when Mu'izz al-Dawla again marched against Mosul, but was forced to cut off his campaign to assist his brother Rukn al-Dawla, who was having trouble in Persia. In exchange, Nasir al-Dawla agreed to recommence the payment of tribute for the Jazira and Syria, as well as to add the names of the three Buyid brothers after that of the Caliph in the Friday prayer.

== War against the Batihah amirate and death of Imad al-Dawla ==
Mu'izz al-Dawla, having assisted his brother, then sent Abu Ja'far al-Saymari to subdue the Batihah amirate. He managed to inflict a series of defeats upon the Batihah ruler 'Imran ibn Shahin, who fled and whose family was imprisoned. During the same period, Mu'izz al-Dawla had his brother-in-law Ispahdost imprisoned for plotting with al-Muti against him.

'Imad al-Dawla shortly died in 949, and Rukn al-Dawla then took the title of senior amir. Mu'izz al-Dawla accepted the change of rulers, and then sent al-Saymari to Shiraz to ensure that Fana-Khusrau, who was the son of Rukn al-Dawla and 'Imad al-Dawla's successor, would take power there. Still, he raised objections when Fana-Khusrau requested the title of "Taj al-Dawla". The title of "Taj" ("crown") implied that Fana-Khusrau was superior to his father and uncle, provoking a reaction from Mu'izz al-Dawla. A more suitable title ("'Adud al-Dawla") was instead chosen. Shortly afterwards, Mu'izz al-Dawla sent another expedition against the Batihah. This campaign, led by a Daylamite officer named Ruzbahan, ended badly. Ruzbahan discovered 'Imran's location and attacked him, but was heavily defeated and forced to withdraw.

'Imran then became even more bold, with his subjects demanding protection money from anyone, including government officials, that crossed their path, and the path to Basra by water was effectively closed off. Mu'izz al-Dawla's chief secretary, Abu Ja'far al-Saymari, died in 950/951, and Abu Muhammad al-Hasan al-Muhallabi succeeded him. Mu'izz al-Dawla, after receiving numerous complaints from his officers about 'Imran, sent another army in 950 or 951, under the joint command of al-Muhallabi and Ruzbahan.

Ruzbahan, who disliked the vizier, convinced him to directly attack 'Imran. He kept his forces in the rear and fled as soon as fighting between the two sides began. 'Imran used the terrain effectively, laying ambushes and confusing al-Muhallabi's army. Many of the vizier's soldiers died in the fighting and he himself only narrowly escaped capture, swimming to safety. Mu'izz al-Dawla then came to terms with 'Imran, acceding to his terms. Prisoners were exchanged and 'Imran was made a vassal of the Buyids, being instated as governor of the Batihah.

Peace lasted for approximately five years between the two sides. A false rumor of Mu'izz al-Dawla's death in 955, however, prompted 'Imran to seize a Buyid convoy traveling from Ahvaz to Baghdad. Mu'izz al-Dawla demanded that the items confiscated be returned, at which point 'Imran returned the money, but kept the goods. Mu'izz al-Dawla sent Ruzbahan a third time to the swamp, but the latter revolted and 'Imran was spared a new attack. Ruzbahan was further joined by the Daylamite soldiers of al-Muhallabi.

== Rebellion of Ruzbahan ==
While Mu'izz was preoccupied with the rebellion of his Daylamite troops under Ruzbahan in southern Iraq, Nasir al-Dawla used the opportunity to advance south and capture Baghdad. In 957, Mu'izz al-Dawla fought a final battle against Ruzbahan. Ruzbahan almost managed to win the battle, but was defeated by Mu'izz al-Dawla's Turkic ghulams. The defeat marked the end of Ruzbahan's rebellion. Ruzbahan was captured during the battle and was imprisoned in a fortress known as Sarat. The Daylamite supporters of Ruzbahan then began planning to capture the fortress and rescue Ruzbahan.

Abu'l-Abbas Musafir, an officer of Mu'izz al-Dawla, who managed to discover the Daylamites' plan, urged Mu'izz al-Dawla to have Ruzbahan killed. Mu'izz al-Dawla, initially demurred, but was convinced of the threat of the plot by a number of his other officers. At nightfall, Mu'izz al-Dawla's guards drowned Ruzbahan in the Tigris river.

Mu'izz al-Dawla then began removing the Daylamites who had followed Ruzbahan from their offices, and arrested a number of them, while installing his Turkic ghulams to higher offices and giving them more land.

== Second war with the Hamdanids ==
Mu'izz al-Dawla then began counter-attacking Nasir al-Dawla, who was not able to maintain his position, and abandoned Baghdad. Peace was renewed in exchange for the resumption of tribute and an additional indemnity, but when Nasir al-Dawla refused to send the second year's payment, the Buyid ruler advanced north. Unable to confront the Buyid army in the field, Nasir al-Dawla abandoned Mosul and fled to Mayyafariqin and then to his brother Sayf al-Dawla in Aleppo. The Buyids captured Mosul and Nasibin, but the Hamdanids and their supporters withdrew to their home territory in the mountains of the north, taking with them their treasures as well as all government records and tax registers. As a result, the Buyid army was unable to support itself in the conquered territory, all the more so since the predominantly Daylamite troops were resented by the local people, who launched guerrilla attacks on them. Sayf al-Dawla tried to mediate with Mu'izz al-Dawla, but his first approaches were rebuffed. Only when he agreed to assume the burden of paying his brother's tribute for the entire Diyar Rabi'a did Mu'izz al-Dawla agree to peace.

In 964, Nasir al-Dawla tried to renegotiate the terms of the arrangement he had made with Mu'izz al-Dawla, and secure Buyid recognition for his eldest son, Fadl Allah Abu Taghlib al-Ghadanfar, as his successor. Mu'izz al-Dawla refused Nasir al-Dawla's offer, and again invaded Hamdanid territory. Once again Mosul and Nasibin were captured, while the Hamdanids fled to the mountain fortresses. As in 958, the Buyids were unable to maintain themselves for long in the Jazira, and soon an agreement was reached which allowed the Hamdanids to return to Mosul. This time, however, Abu Taghlib emerged as the effective leader in his father's place: it was with him, rather than the aged Nasir al-Dawla, that Mu'izz al-Dawla concluded a treaty.

== Later life and death ==
Rukn al-Dawla's struggles in northern Persia against various enemies caused Mu'izz al-Dawla to send military aid for several years. This, combined with continually having to deal with the Hamdanids, prevented Mu'izz al-Dawla from expanding the borders of his state for several years. Despite this, he managed to annex Oman with military support from 'Adud al-Dawla, and shortly afterwards undertook a campaign against the Shahinids of the Mesopotamian marshlands. It was during this campaign that he died, in 967. His son 'Izz al-Dawla, whom he had named his successor during a serious illness in 955, took power following his death. Mu'izz al-Dawla also had other sons named Habashi (known by his title of "Sanad al-Dawla"), Abu Ishaq Ibrahim, Abu Tahir, Marzuban, and a daughter Zubayda.

== Impact and assessment ==
Mu'izz al-Dawla's entrance into Baghdad in 945 began over a century of Buyid rule in Iraq, and also of Shi'ite Buyid control over the Sunni Caliphate. Nevertheless, by the time of his death several problems remained unsolved. The Buyids had difficulty adjusting to Baghdad; Mu'izz al-Dawla almost left the city in favor of Ahvaz. The enemies of the Buyids, such as the Hamdanids and the Byzantines, continued to pose a threat. The struggle for power between Baghdad and Shiraz that first showed itself during Mu'izz al-Dawla's lifetime exploded into violence soon after his death.

Finally, the hostility between the Turks and Daylamites in Baghdad continued to pose a problem. The Sunni Turks, who found their privileges eroded by the Daylamite troops that had entered Baghdad with their master in 945, constantly threatened to upset the internal stability of the state. Mu'izz al-Dawla at first favored the Daylamite troops but later attempted to compromise between the two groups, making a Turk named Sebük-Tegin his chief commander. 'Izz al-Dawla's ascension would soon upset this balance, however, resulting in internal disunity.

== Sources ==
- Bacharach, Jere L. Islamic History through Coins: An Analysis and Catalogue of Tenth-Century Ikhshidid Coinage. Cairo: The American University in Cairo Press, 2006. ISBN 977-424-930-5
- Bosworth, C. E. (1975). "Iran under the Būyids". In Frye, Richard N. (ed.). The Cambridge History of Iran: From the Arab Invasion to the Saljuqs. Vol. 4. Cambridge: Cambridge University Press. pp. 250–305. ISBN 0-521-20093-8.
- Busse, Heribert (1975). "Iran Under the Buyids". In Frye, Richard N. (ed.). The Cambridge History of Iran: From the Arab Invasion to the Saljuqs. Vol. 4. Cambridge: Cambridge University Press. pp. 250–305. ISBN 0-521-20093-8.
- Busse, Heribert (2004) [1969]. Chalif und Grosskönig – Die Buyiden im Irak (945-1055) [Caliph and Great King – The Buyids in Iraq (945-1055)] (in German). Würzburg: Ergon Verlag. ISBN 3-89913-005-7.
- Donohue, John J. (2003). The Buwayhid Dynasty in Iraq 334 H./945 to 403 H./1012: Shaping Institutions for the Future. Leiden and Boston: Brill. ISBN 90-04-12860-3.
- Felix, Wolfgang; Madelung, Wilferd (1995). "DEYLAMITES". In Yarshater, Ehsan (ed.). Encyclopædia Iranica. Vol. VII/4: Deylam, John of–Divorce IV. In modern Persia. London and New York: Routledge & Kegan Paul. pp. 342–347. ISBN 978-1-56859-022-6.
- Kabir, Mafizullah. The Buwayhid dynasty of Baghdad. Calcutta: Iran Society, 1964.
- Kennedy, Hugh (2004) [1986]. The Prophet and the Age of the Caliphates: The Islamic Near East from the 6th to the 11th Century (Second ed.). Harlow: Longman. ISBN 978-0-582-40525-7.
- Miskawaihi. The Eclipse of the Abbasid Caliphate: the Concluding Portion of the Experiences of the Nations, Vol. II. Trans. & ed. H. F. Amedroz and D. S. Margoliouth. London, 1921.
- Nagel, Tilman (1990). "BUYIDS". Encyclopaedia Iranica, Vol. IV, Fasc. 6. London u.a.: Routledge & Kegan Paul. pp. 578–586.
- Zetterstéen, K.V. & Busse, H. (1993). "Mu'izz al-Daula". In Bosworth, C. E.; van Donzel, E.; Heinrichs, W. P. & Pellat, Ch. (eds.). The Encyclopaedia of Islam, Second Edition. Volume VII: Mif–Naz. Leiden: E. J. Brill. ISBN 978-90-04-09419-2.
- Gil, Moshe (1997) [1983]. A History of Palestine, 634–1099. Translated by Ethel Broido. Cambridge: Cambridge University Press. ISBN 0-521-59984-9.

Preceded by Muhammad ibn Shirzad	amir al-umara of the Abbasid Caliphate; 945–967	Succeeded by Izz al-Dawla
New title	Buyid emir of Iraq; 945–967	Succeeded by Izz al-Dawla
