= Henry Frederick Amedroz =

British orientalist (1854–1917)

Henry Frederick Amedroz (8 November 1854 – March 1917) was a leading British orientalist.

== Life ==
Amedroz was born in London, the eldest of the two sons of Henry Frederick Amedroz, a secretary to the First Lord of the Navy, and Magdalene Judith Thornton. He was of French Huguenot descent through his father, and through his mother he was descended from a mixed-race family of planters from Grenada.

Amedroz was educated at Winchester College, gaining an entrance scholarship there in 1866. Amedroz tried to embark on an army career, but was rejected on medical grounds. He attended what is now University College London was called to the bar in 1882 and spent several years working as a bar reporter in the Chancery Courts. During this period he began to study Arabic. Wealthy thanks to an inheritance from his mother's family, he was able to retire while still in his forties, and became a noted scholar of the early Islamic period, with a particular focus on the history of manuscripts and of coins.

His books include The historical remains of Hilāl al-Sābi (1904) and History of Damascus, 263-555 A.H., by Ibn al-Qalānisi (1908), while journal articles appeared in The Journal of the Asiatic Society, as well as German and Italian academic publications. He served on the council for the Royal Asiatic Society from 1912 to 1915, was one of the Gibb Trustees, and was a fellow of the Royal Numismatic Society.

Amedroz never married, and died childless in March 1917.

== Selected works ==
- The Mazalim Jurisdiction in the Ahkam Sultaniyya of Mawardi (1911)
- The Office of Kadi in the Ahkam Sultaniyya of Mawardi (1908)
- The Hisba Jurisdiction in the Ahkam Sultaniyya of Mawardi (1916)
