= Al-Dawla =

Arabic-language title

The Arabic title al-Dawla (الدولة, often rendered ad-Dawla, ad-Daulah, ud-Daulah, etc.) means 'dynasty' or 'polity', (in modern usage, 'government' or "nation-state") and appears in many honorific and regnal titles in the Islamic world. Invented in the 10th century for senior statesmen of the Abbasid Caliphate, such titles soon spread throughout the Islamic world and provided the model for a broad variety of similar titles with other elements, such as al-Din ('Faith' or 'Religion').

== Origin and evolution ==
The term dawla originally meant 'cycle, time, period of rule'. It was particularly often used by the early Abbasid caliphs to signify their "time of success", i.e. reign, and soon came to be particularly associated with the reigning house and acquire the connotation of 'dynasty'. In modern usage, since the 19th century, it has come to mean "state", in particular a secular state of the Western type as opposed to the dynastic or religion-based state systems current until then in the Islamic world.

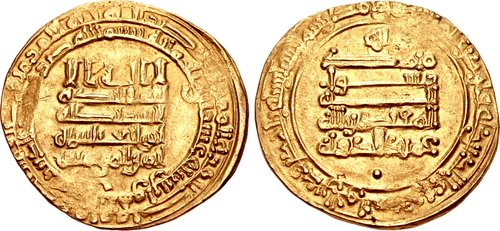
Gold dinar of al-Muqtadir with the names of his heir, Abu'l-Abbas, and vizier, Amid al-Dawla

From the early 10th century, the form al-Dawla began appearing as a compound in honorific titles granted by the caliphs to their senior-most courtiers, beginning with the vizier al-Qasim ibn Ubayd Allah ibn Wahb, who was granted the title of Wali al-Dawla ('Friend of the Dynasty') by the caliph al-Muktafi (r. 902–908), an epithet which also appeared on caliphal coinage. The same honour was also bestowed on al-Qasim's son, al-Husayn, who was named Amid al-Dawla ('Support of the Dynasty') by al-Muqtadir in February 932.

The major turning point was the double award of the titles of Nasir al-Dawla ('Helper of the Dynasty') and Sayf al-Dawla ('Sword of the Dynasty') to the Hamdanid princes Hasan and Ali in April 942. After this time, "the bestowing of such titles on governors formally symbolised the handing over of political power to the 'princelings' of provincial dynasties" (G. Endress). In 946, with the victory of the Buyids in the contest for control of Iraq and the Caliphate's capital of Baghdad, the victorious Ahmad ibn Buya assumed the title of Mu'izz al-Dawla ('Fortifier of the Dynasty'), while his brothers assumed the titles of Imad al-Dawla and Rukn al-Dawla ('Support' and 'Pillar of the Dynasty' respectively).

The example set by the Hamdanids and Buyids was soon imitated throughout the Islamic world, from the Samanids and Ghaznavids in the east to the Fatimids of Egypt and even some of the taifa kingdoms in Muslim Spain. By the end of the 10th century, however, the use of the al-Dawla element had become so widespread that it had become debased, and began to be complemented—and eventually replaced—by other titles. The Buyids, who had from early on begun to use pre-Islamic, Sasanian titles like Shahanshah in parallel to their Arabic titles, again led the way, with Adud al-Dawla receiving from the Caliph the title of Taj al-Milla ('Crown of the [Islamic] Community'). Henceforth, titles with the elements milla ('religion'), umma ([Islamic] community'), din ('faith') began to appear.

Indeed, the proliferation of multiple and ever more lofty titles which began with the award of the al-Dawla forms was so swift and extensive, that already around the year 1000 the scholar al-Biruni lamented the practice, complaining that "the matter became utterly opposed to common sense, and clumsy to the highest degree, so that he who mentions them gets tired before he has scarcely commenced, and he who writes them loses his time and writing space, and he who addresses them risks missing the time of prayer". By the 12th century, the titles with al-Dawla had become lowly honorific appellations; a simple court physician at the Baghdad court, such as Ibn al-Tilmidh, could receive the title of Amin al-Dawla ('Trusted Supporter of the Dynasty'). Nevertheless, despite their debasement, the titles remained indicative of their bearer's "high standing in the community", according to F. Rosenthal. In India, they continued to be used by individual Muslim rulers, and in Iran, cabinet ministers until 1935 often received titles with the al-Dawla compound.

In the major Indian Muslim princely state of Hyderabad, Dawla was one of the aristocratic titles bestowed by the ruling Nizam upon Muslim court retainers, ranking above Khan, Khan Bahadur, Nawab (homonymous with a high Muslim ruler's title), Jang (in ascending order), but under Mulk, Umara and Jah. The equivalent for the court's Hindu retainers was Vant. In Bahwalpur, Mukhlis al-Dawla ('Devoted Servant of the State'), Sayf al-Dawla, Muin al-Dawla and Rukn al-Dawla were all subsidiary titles of the ruling Nawab and Amir. The Qajar dynasty of Persia used titles with the suffix Ed-Dowleh as an honorific for members of the royal family. In early modern Egypt and the Beylik of Tunis, Sahib al-Dawla ('Lord of the State') were used as honorifics for high-ranking ministers, while Ra'is al-Dawla ('Head of the State"' was the formal title of Abd el-Krim, the leader of the Rif Republic.

In kingdoms of pre-colonial Maritime Southeast Asia influenced by the Malay cultural realm, daulat tuanku (Jawi: دولة توانکو, lit. 'thine sovereignty') is the standard salutation for a king or queen regnant (raja or raja permaisuri like Patani's Raja Ijau, or sultanah as in of Aceh) as recorded in many historical texts like the Sejarah Melayu and Hikayat Patani; the greeting is a loyal affirmation of a kingdom's standing solely on the capacity or power of its ruler.

== Examples of the honorific al-Dawla ==
- Adud al-Dawla
- Ala al-Dawla
- Amid al-Dawla
- Amin al-Dawla
- Asad al-Dawla
- Baha' al-Dawla
- Diya' al-Dawla
- Fakhr al-Dawla
- Husam al-Dawla
- Iftikhar al-Dawla
- Imad al-Dawla
- I'timad al-Dawla
- Izz al-Dawla
- Jalal al-Dawla
- Majd al-Dawla
- Mu'ayyad al-Dawla
- Mu'izz al-Dawla
- Mumahhid al-Dawla
- Murtada al-Dawla
- Musharrif al-Dawla
- Mushir al-Dawla
- Mu'tamid al-Dawla
- Nasir al-Dawla
- Najib al-Dawla
- Qawam al-Dawla
- Rukn al-Dawla
- Sa'ad al-Dawla
- Sa'd al-Dawla
- Sa'id al-Dawla
- Sama' al-Dawla
- Samsam al-Dawla
- Sayf al-Dawla
- Shams al-Dawla
- Sharaf al-Dawla
- Shibl al-Dawla Nasr
- Siraj ud-Dawla
- Sultan al-Dawla
- Taj al-Dawla
- 'Uddat al-Dawla
- Zahir al-Dawla
