= Khusrau Shah =

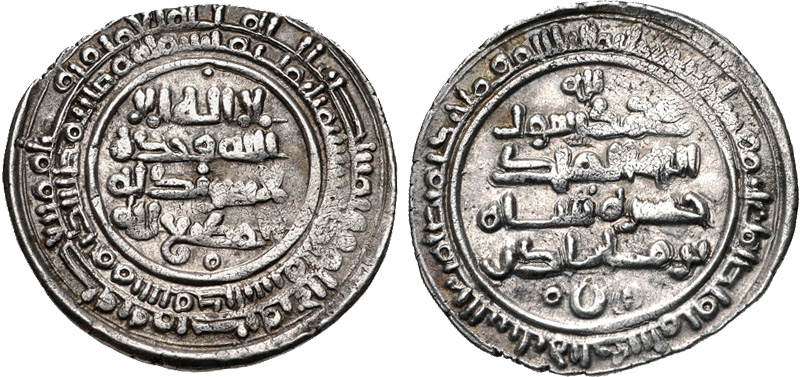
Coin minted during the reign of Khusrau Shah.

Khusrau Shah (also spelled Khosrau Shah, Khosrow Shah, and Khusraw Shah) was the last king of the Justanids from 972 to ca. 1004. He was the son and successor of Manadhar.

The words "Khosrow" and "Shah" are both Persian words that mean "king".

== Reign ==
During the reign of Khusrau Shah, relations between the Buyids flourished; he aided the Buyid ruler Adud al-Dawla in his campaigns by reinforcing him with Daylamite troops. When Khusrau Shah was sick, Adud al-Dawla sent one of his physicians, Jibrail III, to treat him. Fanna Khusraw (Adud al-Dawla) married the sister of Khusrau Shah, who bore him Taj al-Dawla (Abu'l-Husain Ahmad) and Diya' al-Dawla (Abu Tahir Firuzshah). Khusrau Shah's brother Fuladh ibn Manadhar was a prominent Buyid officer who held much influence in the Buyid court of Baghdad.

Khusrau Shah died ca. 1004. The name of his successor is unknown, but the dynasty continued to rule in Rudbar until the late 11th-century.

== Sources ==
- Donohue, John J. (2003). The Buwayhid Dynasty in Iraq 334 H./945 to 403 H./1012: Shaping Institutions for the Future. Leiden and Boston: Brill. ISBN 90-04-12860-3.
- Madelung, W. (1992). Religious and ethnic movements in medieval Islam. Variorum. ISBN 0860783103.
- Madelung, W. (1975). "The Minor Dynasties of Northern Iran". In Frye, Richard N. (ed.). The Cambridge History of Iran. Vol. 4. Cambridge: Cambridge University Press. pp. 198–249. ISBN 0-521-20093-8.

Preceded by Manadhar	Justanid king 972-1004	Succeeded by Unnamed Justanid ruler
