= Shahanshahvand =

Shahanshahvand was the name of a royal Gilite clan roaming in Dakhel, Iran. A member of the clan, Lili ibn al-Nu'man, ruled as the King of the Gilites in the early 10th-century until he was killed in 921 in a battle with the Samanids.

== History ==
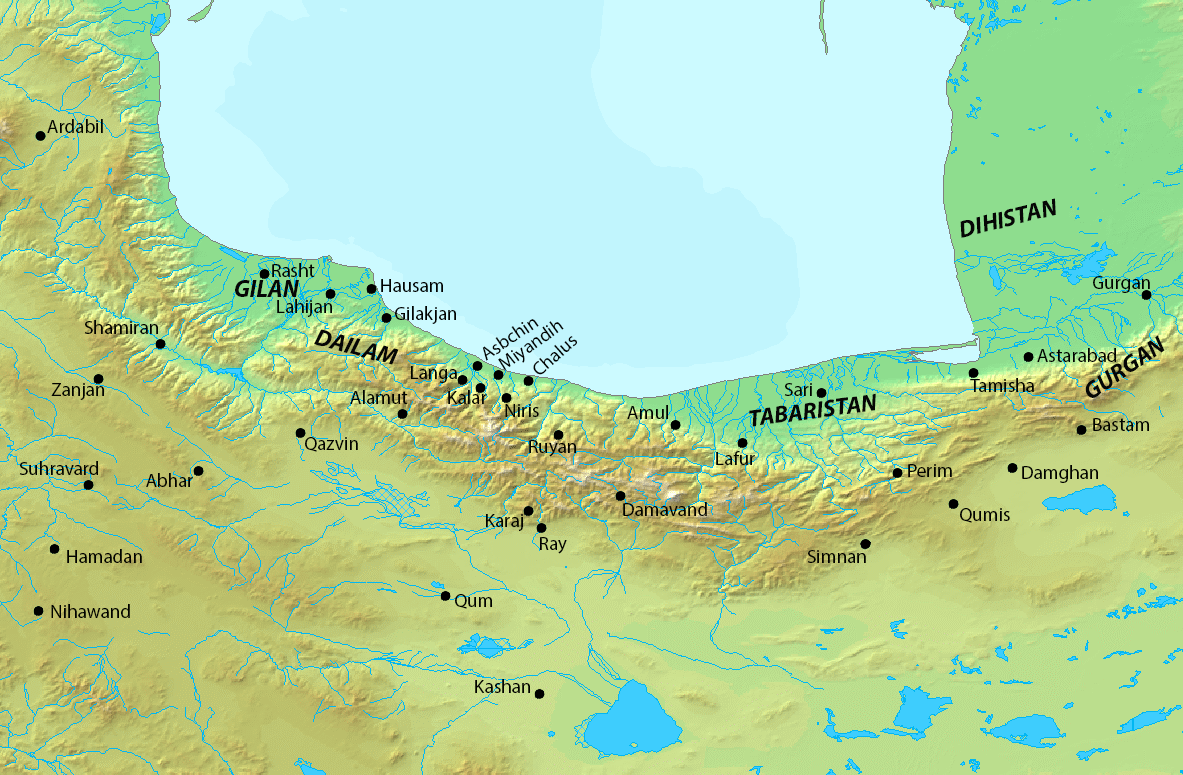
Map of northern Iran

The Shahanshahvand clan is first mentioned during Tirdadh's rule as king of the Gilites in the early 10th-century.

== Sources ==
- Madelung, W. (1975). "The Minor Dynasties of Northern Iran". In Frye, R. N. (ed.). The Cambridge History of Iran, Volume 4: From the Arab Invasion to the Saljuqs. Cambridge: Cambridge University Press. pp. 198–249. ISBN 978-0-521-20093-6.
- Madelung, W. "GĪLĀN iv. History in the Early Islamic Period". Encyclopaedia Iranica, Online Edition.
