= Asfar ibn Kurduya =

Dailamite officer

Asfar ibn Kurduya (also spelled Kurdawayh, Kardawayh and Kurdawaih), was a Daylamite officer who served the Buyid dynasty.

Asfar is first mentioned during the reign of the Buyid ruler Adud al-Dawla, as one of the most prominent officers of the Empire. After the death of Adud al-Dawla in 983, the Buyid Empire was thrown into civil war; the Empire was disputed between his two sons Samsam al-Dawla and Sharaf al-Dawla. Samsam al-Dawla ruled Iraq, while Sharaf al-Dawla ruled Fars and Kerman.

In 986, Asfar rebelled against Samsam al-Dawla, and changed his allegiance to Sharaf al-Dawla. However, Asfar quickly changed his mind, and declared allegiance to the latter's other brother Abu Nasr Firuz Kharshadh, who was shortly given the laqab of "Baha' al-Dawla." However, Samsam al-Dawla, with the aid of Fuladh ibn Manadhar, suppressed the rebellion, and imprisoned Baha al-Dawla. After this event, Asfar is no longer mentioned.

== Sources ==
- Donohue, John J. (2003). The Buwayhid Dynasty in Iraq 334h., 945 to 403h., 1012: Shaping Institutions for the Future. ISBN 9789004128606.
- Houtsma, M. Th (1905). First Encyclopaedia of Islam: 1913-1936. BRILL. pp. 1–42. ISBN 9789004097964.
- Kraemer, Joel L. (1992). Humanism in the Renaissance of Islam: The Cultural Revival During the Buyid Age. BRILL. pp. 1–329. ISBN 9789004097360.
