= Samsam al-Dawla =

Buyid amir of Iraq (983–987)

- Amir al-umara
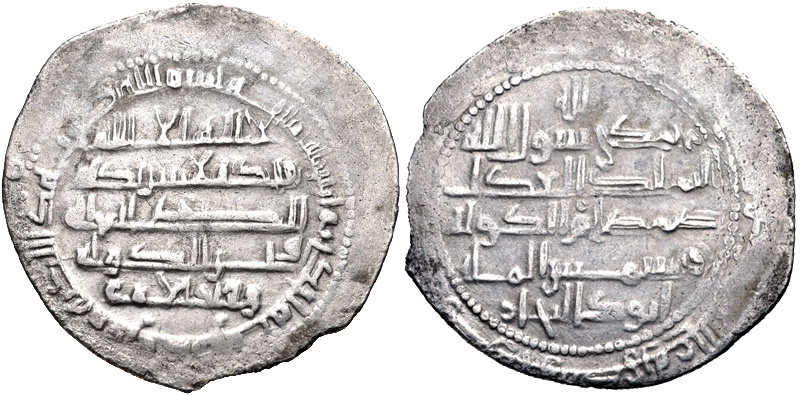
- Coin minted during the reign of Samsam al-Dawla.

Amir of Iraq
- Reign: 983–987
- Predecessor: 'Adud al-Dawla
- Successor: Sharaf al-Dawla

Amir of Fars
- Reign: 988/9 – 998
- Predecessor: Sharaf al-Dawla
- Successor: Baha' al-Dawla
- Born: c. 963
- Died: December 998; Near Isfahan
- Dynasty: Buyid
- Father: 'Adud al-Dawla
- Mother: Sayyida bint Siyahgil
- Religion: Shia Islam

Abu Kalijar Marzuban, also known as Samsam al-Dawla (Arabic: صمصام الدولة, romanized: Ṣamṣām al-Dawla, lit. 'Cutting Sword of the Dynasty'; c. 963 – December 998) was the Buyid amir of Iraq (983–987), as well as Fars and Kerman (988 or 989 – 998). He was the second son of 'Adud al-Dawla. The Abbasids recognized his succession and conferred upon him the title Samsam al-Dawla. He lacked the qualities of his father 'Adud al-Dawla and failed to have a grip upon his state affairs. His rule was marked by revolts and civil wars.

== Biography ==
=== Early life and rise ===
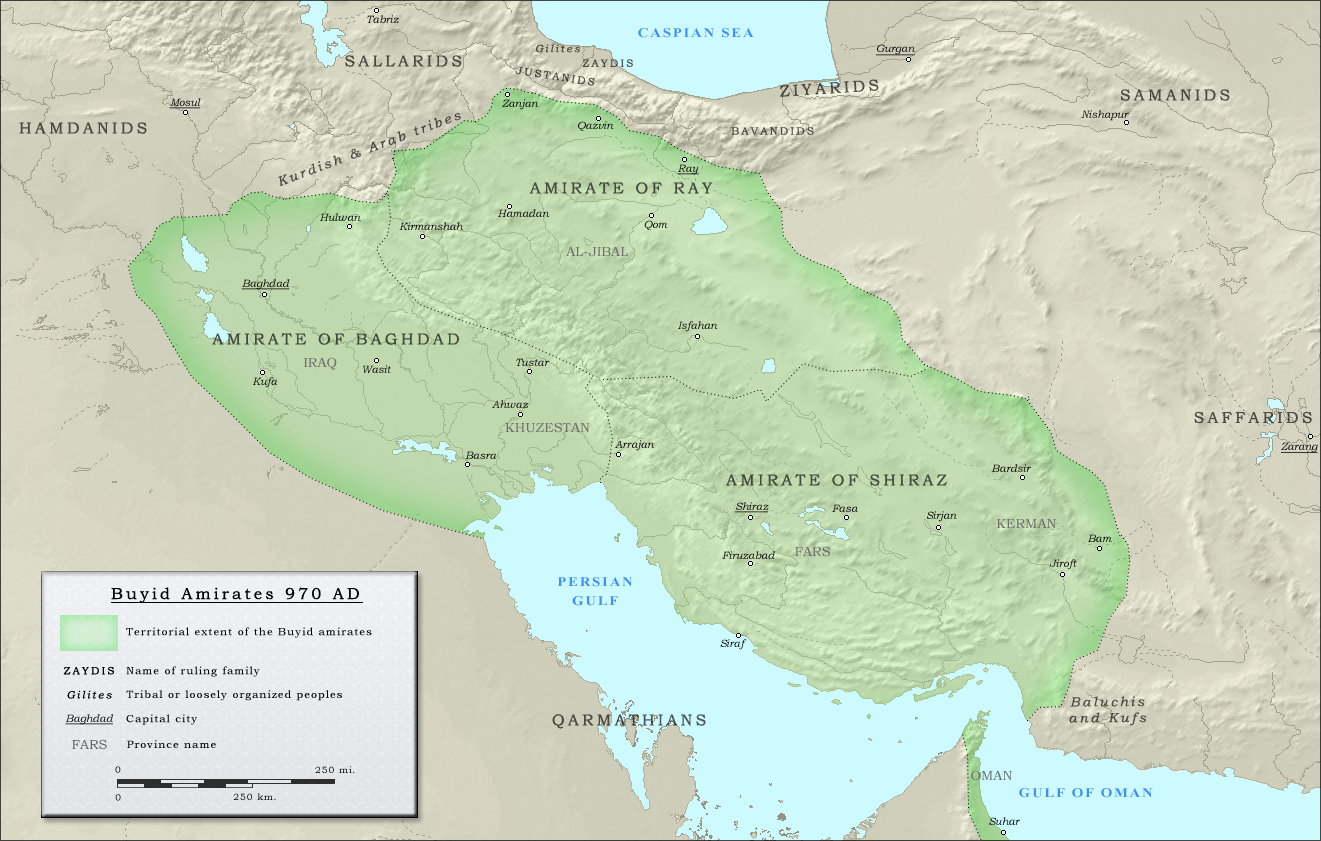
The Buyid amirates in ca. 970

Abu Kalijar Marzuban was born in 963, the son of Adud al-Dawla and Sayyida bint Siyahgil, a daughter of Siyahgil, a Gilite ruler, which made Abu Kalijar Marzuban a distant relation to the Ziyarid dynasty, who were in turn descended from a sister of the Gilite ruler Harusindan, the father of Siyahgil.

During 'Adud al-Dawla's lifetime, Abu Kalijar Marzuban was assigned the governorships of Buyid Oman and Khuzestan. Despite Marzuban's status as second son (Shirdil being the eldest), he was considered to be his father's heir. This issue was never completely clarified by 'Adud al-Dawla before his death, resulting in a succession crisis. Marzuban, who was in Baghdad when his father died, at first kept his death secret in order to ensure his succession. When he made the death of his father public, he took the title "Samsam al-Dawla".

Shirdil also claimed the succession, and from his province of Kerman invaded and captured Fars. He took the title "Sharaf al-Dawla". Sharaf al-Dawla's invasion of Fars allowed two more of Samsam al-Dawla's brothers, Taj al-Dawla and Diya' al-Dawla, to set up their own rule in Basra and Khuzestan. In Diyar Bakr, a Kurd named Badh ibn Hasanwaih took power and forced Samsam al-Dawla to confirm him as its ruler. To the north, Samsam al-Dawla's uncle Fakhr al-Dawla ruled an extensive territory from Ray. The rulers of Basra and Khuzestan soon acknowledged Fakhr al-Dawla as senior amir, making the latter the most powerful of the Buyids and moving the senior amirate from Iraq to Jibal.

=== Early reign ===
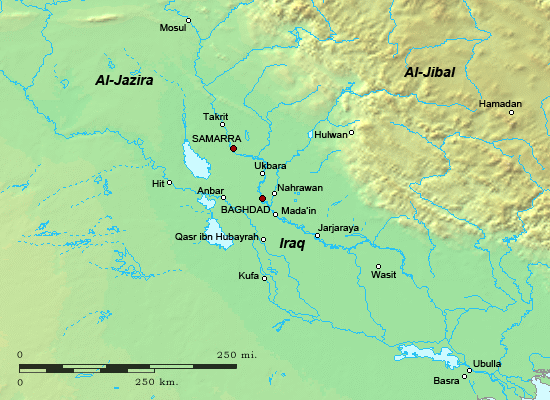
Map of Iraq in the 9th–10th centuries

Despite Fakhr al-Dawla's power, it was Sharaf al-Dawla who posed the largest threat to Samsam al-Dawla. He recovered Buyid Oman, which had earlier seceded to Samsam al-Dawla. In 983, the Turkic soldiers of Iraq betrayed Samsam al-Dawla, and defected to Sharaf. However, his relative from his mother's side, Ziyar ibn Shahrakawayh, managed to make most of them change their mind and stay loyal to Samsam al-Dawla.

In 985, a Dailamite chief, Saffar ibn Quddawiyah, revolted against the authority of Samsam and joined with Shirdil. Saffar led a force against Samsam to Baghdad. Samsam sent a stronger force in response, and consequently Saffar was defeated. In early 986 Samsam captured Basra and Khuzestan, forcing the two brothers to flee to Fakhr al-Dawla's territory. During the same period, another Dailamite named Asfar ibn Kurdawayh rebelled against Samsam al-Dawla, and changed his allegiance to Sharaf al-Dawla.

However, Asfar quickly changed his mind, and declared allegiance to the latter's other brother Abu Nasr Firuz Kharshadh, who was shortly given the honorific epithet of "Baha' al-Dawla." However, Samsam al-Dawla, with the aid of Fuladh ibn Manadhar, suppressed the rebellion, imprisoned Baha al-Dawla, and executed his supporters, including Bahram ibn Ardashir al-Majusi. Samsam al-Dawla then made peace with Sharaf al-Dawla, and agreed to release Baha' al-Dawla.

However, Sharaf betrayed Samsam, and quickly marched against him. Sharaf occupied Ahwaz, then sent his forces to Wasit which fell to him in 986 AD. From there Samsam marched to Baghdad. Before any confrontation could take place, there was a revolt in the army of Samsam. He was therefore defeated and forced to surrender. Thereupon Baghdad fell to Sharaf and Samsam was put in prison.

=== Regaining his lost position ===
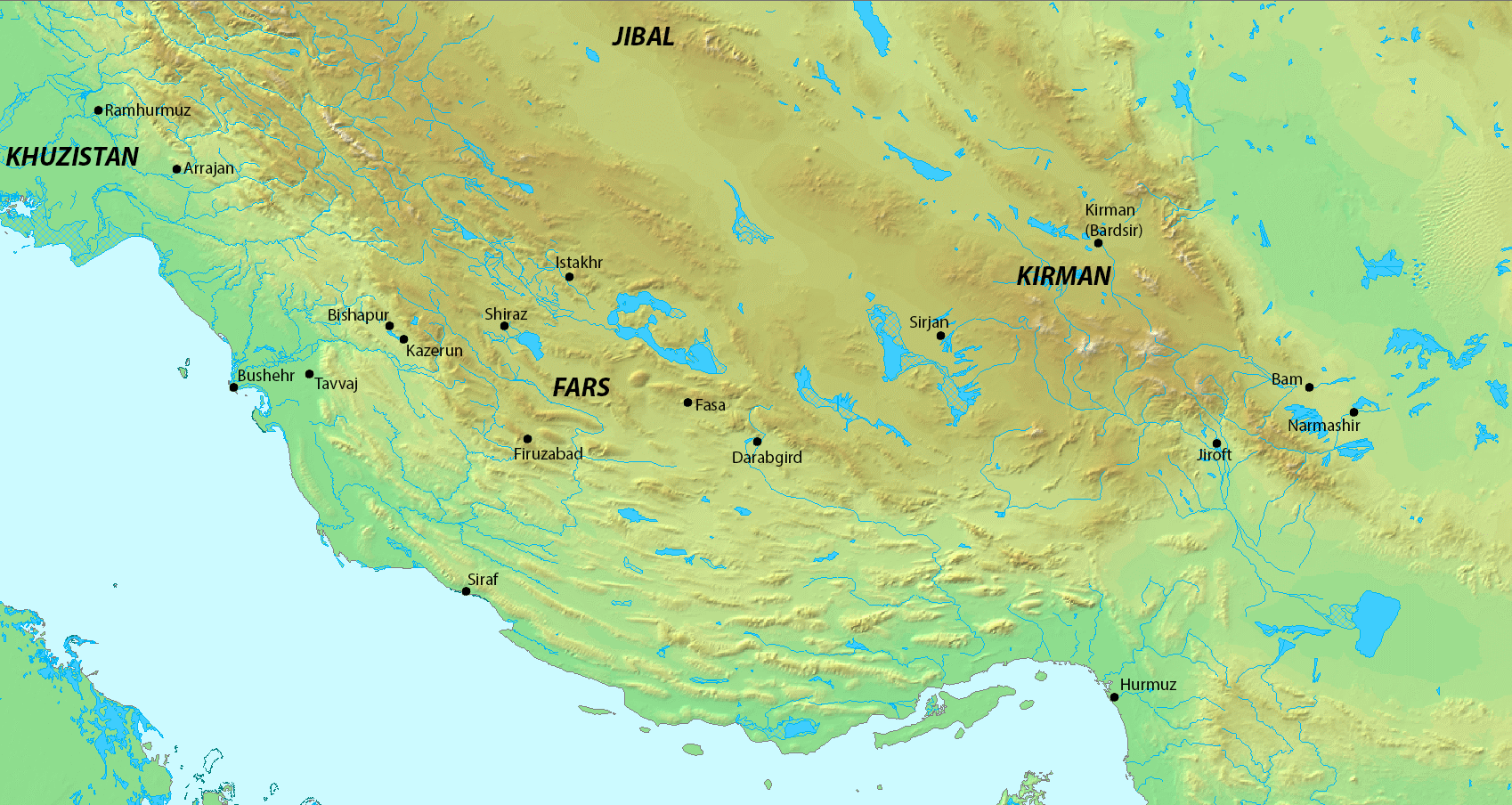
Map of Fars and its surrounding regions in the 9th–10th centuries

Sharaf al-Dawla's death in 988 or 989 provided Samsam al-Dawla with the opportunity to make a return to power. Despite having been partially blinded shortly before Sharaf al-Dawla's death, he managed to escape from prison and with the aid of Sharaf al-Dawla's former vizier Ala ibn Hasan, wrested control of Fars, Kerman and Khuzestan from his brother Baha' al-Dawla, who had succeeded Sharaf al-Dawla. Both Baha' al-Dawla and his brother found their positions threatened by Fakhr al-Dawla. The latter invaded Khuzestan in an attempt to split the two brothers' territories. This act prompted the both of them to draw up an alliance. Samsam al-Dawla recognized Baha' al-Dawla as the ruler of Iraq and Khuzestan, while he himself kept Arrajan, Fars and Kerman. Both promised to consider each other as equals, and took the title of "king".

In 991 Baha' al-Dawla attempted to get rid of Samsam al-Dawla. He took the title of Shâhanshâh and invaded the latter's territory. His forces were defeated, however, and Samsam al-Dawla regained Khuzestan. He even gained control of the Buyid territories in Oman. In order to further strengthen his position, Samsam al-Dawla decided to recognise Fakhr al-Dawla as senior amir, submitting to his authority.

=== Losing power ===
Fakhr al-Dawla's death in 997, coupled with Samsam al-Dawla's increasing troubles within his realm, made Baha' al-Dawla the strongest of the Buyid princes. He gained the support of the Kurdish ruler Badr ibn Hasanwaih and prepared for the expedition. The invasion began in December of 998. Scarcely had the campaign begun, however, when Samsam al-Dawla was murdered by one of the sons of 'Izz al-Dawla near Isfahan while fleeing from Shiraz. Baha' al-Dawla took Shiraz, defeated 'Izz al-Dawla's sons, and reunited Iraq, Fars and Kerman.

== Sources ==
- Bosworth, C. E. (1975). "Iran under the Būyids". In Frye, Richard N. (ed.). The Cambridge History of Iran: From the Arab Invasion to the Saljuqs. Vol. 4. Cambridge: Cambridge University Press. pp. 250–305. ISBN 0-521-20093-8.
- Donohue, John J. (2003). The Buwayhid Dynasty in Iraq 334 H./945 to 403 H./1012: Shaping Institutions for the Future. Leiden and Boston: Brill. ISBN 90-04-12860-3.
- Kennedy, Hugh (2004) [1986]. The Prophet and the Age of the Caliphates: The Islamic Near East from the 6th to the 11th Century (Second ed.). Harlow: Longman. ISBN 978-0-582-40525-7.
- Madelung, W. (1975). "The Minor Dynasties of Northern Iran". In Frye, Richard N. (ed.). The Cambridge History of Iran: From the Arab Invasion to the Saljuqs. Vol. 4. Cambridge: Cambridge University Press. pp. 198–249. ISBN 0-521-20093-8.
- Nagel, Tilman (1990). "BUYIDS". Encyclopaedia Iranica, Vol. IV, Fasc. 6. London u.a.: Routledge & Kegan Paul. pp. 578–586.

Preceded by 'Adud al-Dawla	Buyid Amir (in Iraq); 983–987	Succeeded by Sharaf al-Dawla
Preceded by Sharaf al-Dawla	Buyid Amir (in Fars & Kerman); 988/9–998	Succeeded by Baha' al-Dawla
