= Banu Ilyas =

Iranian dynasty in Kerman (932–968)

Banu Ilyas بنو الیاس Āl-e Ilyās
- 932–968
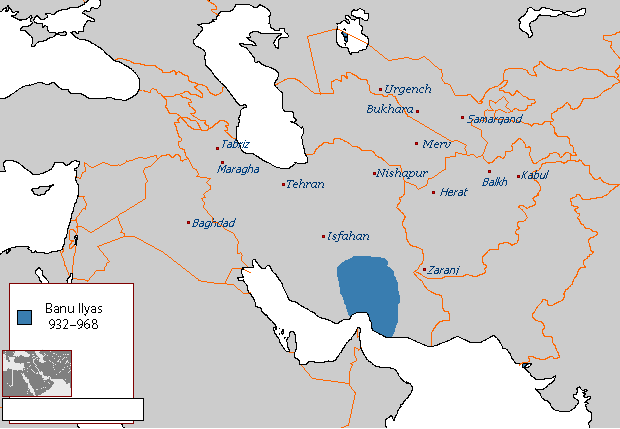
- The Ilyasids at their greatest extent
- Capital: Bardsir
- Common languages: Persian
- Religion: Islam
- Government: Monarchy
- Emir
  - 932–967: Muhammad ibn Ilyas
  - 967–968: Ilyasa ibn Muhammad
- Historical era: Middle Ages
  - Established: 932
  - Buyid conquest: 968
Preceded by	Succeeded by
Samanid Empire	Buyid dynasty

The Banu Ilyas (Persian: بنو الیاس) or Ilyasids were an Iranian dynasty of Sogdian origin which ruled the province of Kerman from 932 until 968 CE. The capital was located at Bardasir.

== Muhammad b. Ilyas ==
Abu 'Ali Muhammad b. Ilyas was a member of the Samanid army and was of Sogdian origin. He supported the failed 929 coup against the Samanid amir Nasr b. Ahmad. After the rebellion failed he fled south, eventually arriving at Kerman in 932. He managed to extend his control over the northern part of the province, while the southern and eastern mountainous portions remained under the control of the local Koch and Baloch who had long supported the Elyasid rulers and earlier regional powers. Despite Samanid and later Buyid attempts to expel him from Kerman, he succeeded in maintaining his rule there for over thirty years. He acknowledged either the Samanids or the Buyids as his overlords but was effectively independent. In 967 he suffered a stroke and was eventually compelled to abdicate in favor of his son Ilyasa.

== Ilyasa b. Muhammad ==
Ilyasa b. Muhammad quickly angered the neighboring Buyids under 'Adud al-Daula by arguing over some territory on the border of Kerman and Fars. Before invading Kerman, 'Adud made sure to win over members of Ilyasa's army. This strategy was effective; when he did invade and capture Bardasir, the bulk of Ilyasa's army deserted him. Control of Kerman was transferred nominally to 'Adud's son Abu'l Fawaris Shirzil, while 'Adud's general Gorgir (Kurkir) was given real control. Ilyasa fled to Bukhara, where the Samanids welcomed him, but he aroused their hostility by complaining that they would not help him retake Kerman. He was expelled from Bukhara to Khwarazm, while the governor of Khurasan seized the possessions of Ilyasa's that he had left in Kuhistan. In Khwarazm Ilyasa was stricken with sympathetic ophthalmia and he soon died.

== Sulaiman b. Muhammad ==
In 969 or 970 Ilyasa's brother Sulaiman, who had fled to the Samanids before the Buyid conquest due to a quarrel with his father, convinced the Samanid amir Mansur b. Nuh to supply him an army to reconquer Kerman. His hope was that he could gain the support of the Koch and Baloch, who were still resisting Buyid authority. Gorgir moved to stop them, and in the ensuing battle between Jiroft and Bam, Sulaiman, two of Ilyasa's sons, Bakr and al-Husain, and a large portion of the Khurasanian troops were killed.

== Al-Husain ==
One more attempt by the Ilyasids to retake Kerman occurred in 975 by a nephew or possibly son of Muhammad, al-Husain. Al-Husain, learning of a rebellion in Kerman, traveled from Khurasan and took control of part of the rebelling forces. 'Adud al-Duala's vizier Abu'l-Qasim al-Mutahhar b. 'Abdallah was sent to restore order to the province; he defeated al-Husain in Jiruft and captured him. Nothing more is heard of him and his capture marked the definite end of the Ilyasids in Kerman.
