= Harusindan =

Third king of the Gilites

Harusindan was the third king of the Gilites, ruling briefly in 921. He was the son of Tirdadh, who was the first king of the Gilites during the 10th century, but later died and was succeeded by another Gilite named Lili ibn al-Nu'man, who was from another clan. Harusindan also had a sister who married a Dailamite nobleman named Ziyar, and together they had a son named Mardavij, who would later create the Ziyarid dynasty.

After the death of Lili in 921, Harusindan ascended the Gilite throne. A group of Gilites and Dailamites shortly planned to kill the Alid ruler Abu Muhammad Hasan ibn Qasim. However, Abu Muhammad eventually found out about the conspiracy, and had Harusindan killed, who was shortly succeeded by the Farawand chieftain Khushkiya. Khushkiya's rule was brief; the kingship shortly returned to Harusindan's son Siyahgil. Harusindan also had another son named Shahrakawayh, who had a son named Ziyar ibn Shahrakawayh.

== Sources ==
- Donohue, John J. (2003). The Buwayhid Dynasty in Iraq 334 H./945 to 403 H./1012: Shaping Institutions for the Future. Leiden and Boston: Brill. ISBN 90-04-12860-3.
- Kennedy, Hugh (2004). The Prophet and the Age of the Caliphates: The Islamic Near East from the 6th to the 11th Century (Second ed.). Harlow: Longman. ISBN 978-0-582-40525-7.
- Madelung, W. (1967), Abu Ishaq al-Sabi on the Alids of Tabaristan and Gilan, Cambridge: The University of Chicago Press, pp. 1–57, ISBN 978-0-521-20093-6, JSTOR 543520
- Madelung, W. (1975). "The Minor Dynasties of Northern Iran". In Frye, Richard N. (ed.). The Cambridge History of Iran. Vol. 4. Cambridge: Cambridge University Press. pp. 198–249. ISBN 0-521-20093-8.

| Preceded by Lili ibn al-Nu'man | King of the Gilites; 921 | Succeeded by Khushkiya |
