= Farawand =

Iranian clan

Farawand was the name of a royal Daylamite clan roaming in Dakhel, Iran. A member of the clan, Khushkiya ibn Wijka, ruled as King of the Gilites in the early 10th-century.

== Sources ==
- Madelung, W. (1967), Abu Ishaq al-Sabi on the Alids of Tabaristan and Gilan, Cambridge: The University of Chicago Press, pp. 1–57, ISBN 978-0-521-20093-6, JSTOR 543520
