= Lili ibn al-Nu'man =

Lili ibn al-Nu'man, also known as Lili ibn Shahdust, was the leader of the Shahanshahvand clan, and also ruled as the second king of the Gilites, ruling from the early 10th-century to 921. He served in high offices under his overlord the Zaydids. In 921, he invaded the territories of Samanids, conquering Damghan, Nishapur and Merv. He was, however, defeated and killed by a Samanid army under Abu'l-Fadl al-Bal'ami and Simjur al-Dawati. Lili was succeeded by Harusindan, who was a Gilite from another clan.

== Sources ==
- Madelung, W. (1975). "The Minor Dynasties of Northern Iran". In Frye, R. N. (ed.). The Cambridge History of Iran, Volume 4: From the Arab Invasion to the Saljuqs. Cambridge: Cambridge University Press. pp. 198–249. ISBN 978-0-521-20093-6.
- C. E. Bosworth "Bal'ami, Abu'l-Fazl Mohammad." Encyclopedia Iranica. 23 January 2014. <http://www.iranicaonline.org/articles/balami-abul-fazl-mohammad-b>
- Treadwell, Luke. "Simjurids." Encyclopaedia Iranica. Ed. Ehsan Yarshater. Columbia University. Retrieved 8 May 2012.

Preceded by Tirdadh	King of the Gilites; 10th-century–921	Succeeded by Harusindan
