= Ziyar ibn Shahrakuya =

Ziyar ibn Shahrakuya (Persian: کوی کشت و ابنشهر; also spelled Shahrakawayh), was a high-ranking Gilaki military officer who served the Buyids.

Ziyar was the son of Shahrakawayh, the son of Harusindan, the maternal uncle of the Ziyarid ruler Mardavij. Ziyar had a cousin, who married the Buyid ruler Adud al-Dawla, and bore him one son named Abu Kalijar Marzuban. During that period, Ziyar, along with a Daylamite officer named Fuladh ibn Manadhar, dominated the Buyid court of Baghdad.

After the death of Adud al-Dawla in 983, the Buyid Empire was thrown into civil war; the Empire was disputed between his two sons Abu Kalijar Marzuban (who took the name Samsam al-Dawla) and Sharaf al-Dawla. The Turkic soldiers of Iraq shortly betrayed Samsam al-Dawla, and went towards to the court of Sharaf al-Dawla. However, Ziyar managed to make most of them change their mind and stay loyal to Samsam al-Dawla. In 987, Sharaf al-Dawla marched towards Baghdad and deposed Samsam al-Dawla. He then imprisoned Fuladh and had Ziyar executed.

== Sources ==
- Donohue, John J. (2003). The Buwayhid Dynasty in Iraq 334 H./945 to 403 H./1012: Shaping Institutions for the Future. Leiden and Boston: Brill. ISBN 90-04-12860-3.
- Madelung, W. (1975). "The Minor Dynasties of Northern Iran". In Frye, Richard N. (ed.). The Cambridge History of Iran. Vol. 4. Cambridge: Cambridge University Press. pp. 198–249. ISBN 0-521-20093-8.
- Madelung, W. (1992). Religious and ethnic movements in medieval Islam. ISBN 0860783103.
