= Ed-Dowleh =

Ed-Dowleh is a suffix used as part of titles for members of royalty who were in governing positions during the Qajar dynasty in Iran (Persia). Some of the children of Abbas Mirza who were governors also carried this title. It derives from the medieval Arabic title al-Dawla. The suffix translates literally into "of the government" but in actual usage is meant to refer to the shah who bestows the title of -dowleh. Ed-Dowleh can also be translated as "of the Empire or State."

== Usage ==
An example of usage would be the brother of Mohammad Ali Shah Qajar, Salar ed-Dowleh (1881-1961). Some other examples using members of the Qajar royal family carrying the title include:

=== Brothers of Mohammad Shah Qajar ===
- Bahram Mirza (royal title: Moez ed-Dowleh)
- Ardeshir Mirza (royal title: Rokn ed-Dowleh)
- Farhad Mirza (royal title: Mo'tamed ed-Dowleh)
- Firuz Mirza (royal title: Nosrat ed-Dowleh)
- Khanlar Mirza (royal title: Ehteshami ed-Dowleh)
- Hamzeh Mirza (royal title: Heshmat ed-Dowleh)
- Lotfollah Mirza (royal title: Shoa' ed-Dowleh)

=== Sons of Nasser al-Din Shah ===
- Mass'oud Mirza Zell-e Soltan (royal title: Yamin ed-Dowleh)
- Jalal ed-Dowleh

== Decline ==
The title was largely lost after Reza Shah, the creator of the Pahlavi dynasty, who had Iranians pick family names. Many families with the ed-Dowleh suffix dropped the title while keeping the first segment of their title as their surnames.
