= Band-e Amir (dam) =

Dam in Fars, Iran

Coordinates: 29.77369°N 52.84736°E

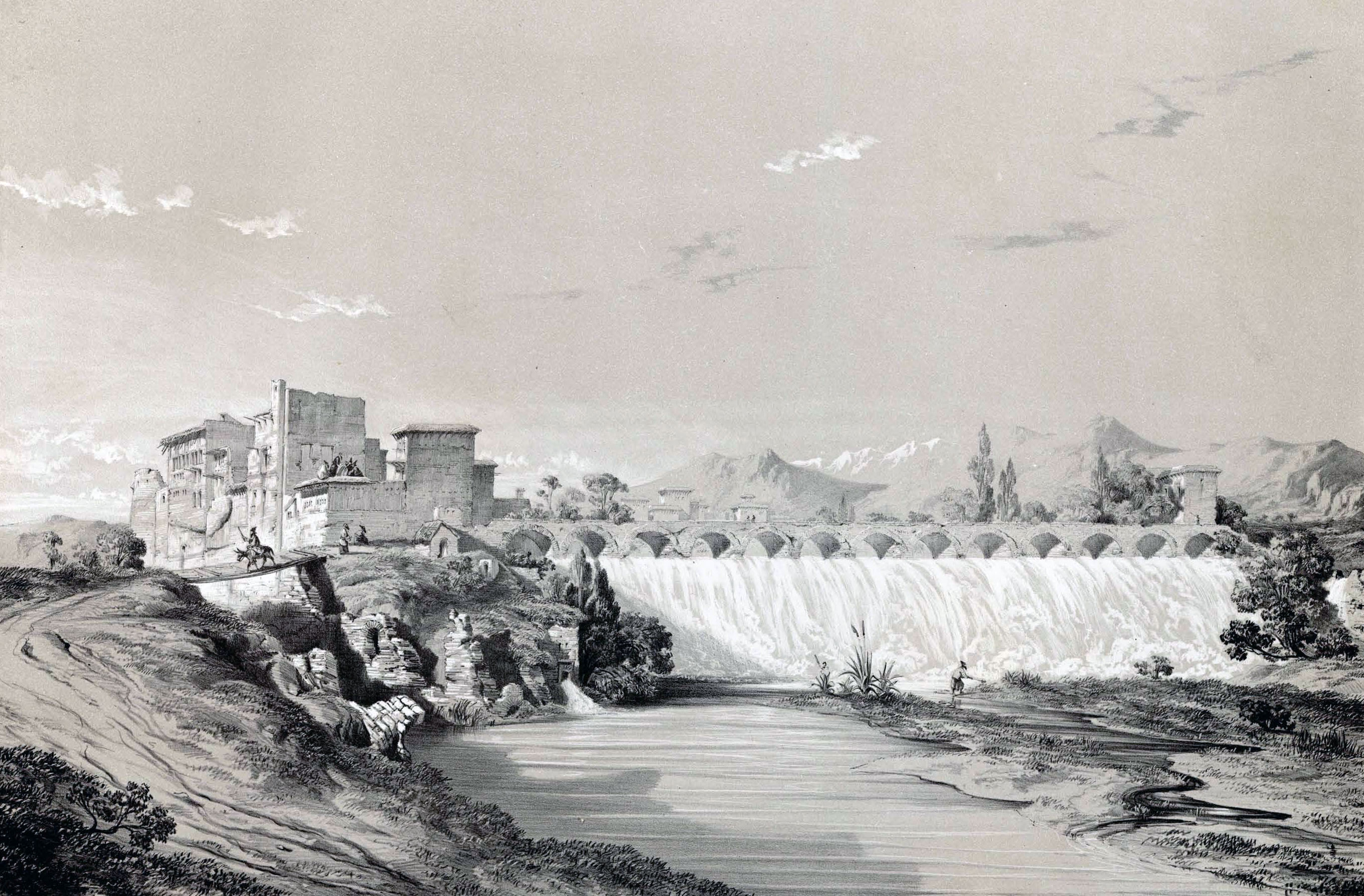
Illustration of the Band-e Amir by Eugène Flandin, dated 1851

Band-e Amir ("Dam of the Amir") or Band-e Azodi, is a dam 20 km northeast of the city of Shiraz in Iran, built by the Buyid ruler Adud al-Dawla (r. 949–983) in 975. It remains in use to this day.

== Sources ==
- Bürgel, Ch.; Mottahedeh, R. (1988). "ʿAżod-al-dawla, Abū Šojāʿ Fannā Ḵosrow". In Yarshater, Ehsan (ed.). Encyclopædia Iranica. Vol. III/3: Azerbaijan IV–Bačča(-ye) Saqqā. London and New York: Routledge & Kegan Paul. pp. 265–269. ISBN 978-0-71009-115-4.
- Lerner, J. (1988). "Band-e Amīr". In Yarshater, Ehsan (ed.). Encyclopædia Iranica. Vol. III/7: Banān–Bardesanes. London and New York: Routledge & Kegan Paul. pp. 680–681. ISBN 978-0-71009-119-2.
