= Kurkir ibn Justan =

Kurkir ibn Justan (Persian: ک کرمنتحقیق بن جو استن) was an Iranian military officer, a Daylamite military officer of the Buyids, who served as the chief captain of the army of Kirman from 968 until his downfall in 972.

== Biography ==
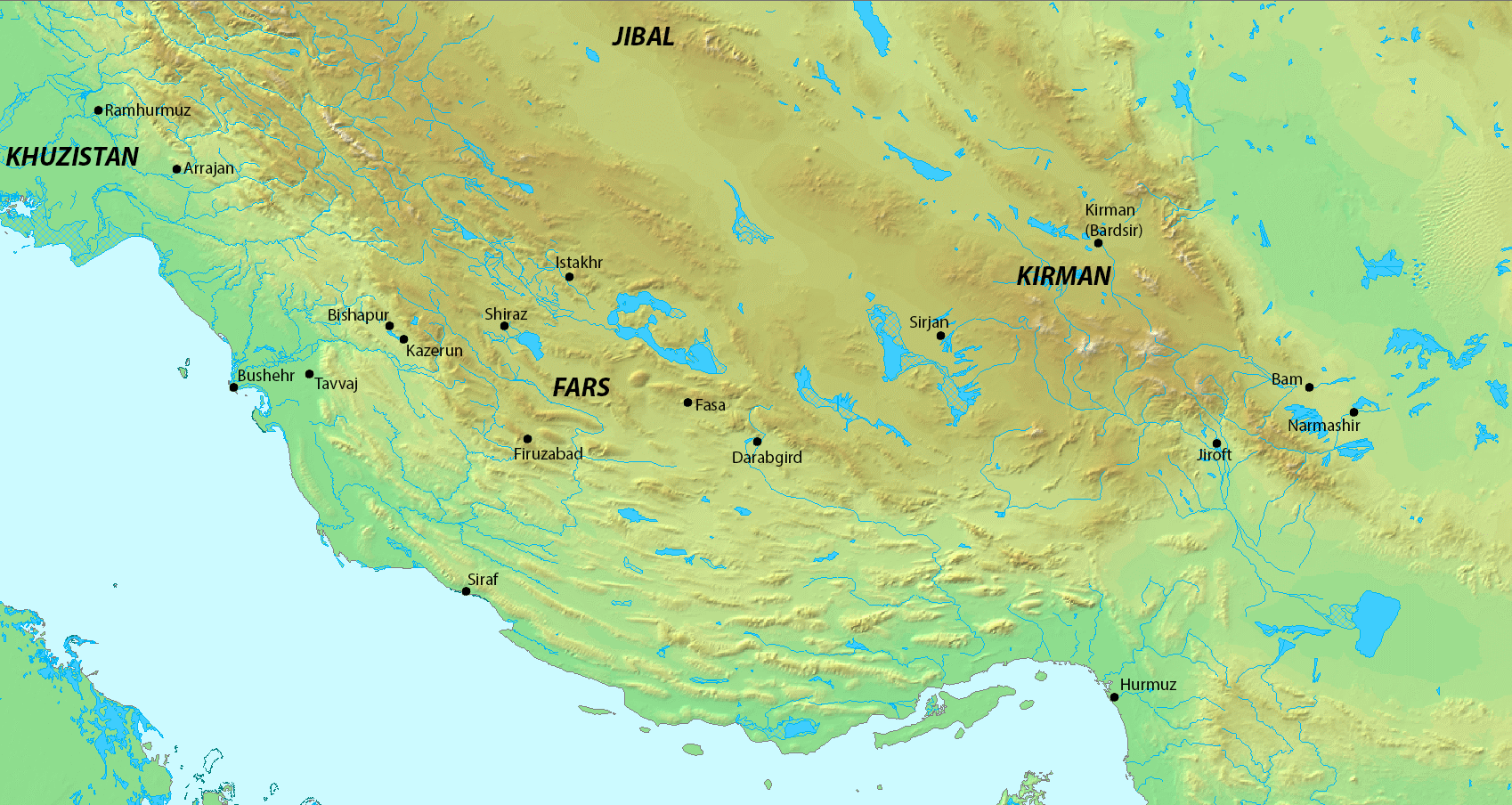
Map of Kirman and its surrounding regions in the 9th–10th centuries

He is first mentioned in 968, when he was appointed as the chief captain of the army of Kirman by the Buyid ruler 'Adud al-Dawla. In ca. 970, was sent on an expedition against the Ilyasid rebel Sulaiman ibn Muhammad; the outcome was positive for the Buyids - Kurkir managed to defeat and kill the rebel, including of his nephews, Bakr and al-Husain. Kurkir then had their heads sent to 'Adud al-Dawla, who was Shiraz. However, the natives of Kirman continued to resist Kurkir, who was shortly reinforced by an army under 'Abid ibn 'Ali.

They then marched towards Jiroft, and fought the rebels on December 13, which resulted in victory for the Buyids, and the death of several leading figures of the rebellion. In 972, Kurkir, who had offended 'Adud al-Dawla, shortly fell out of favor, and was imprisoned in Siraf. During his captivity, he was treated with honor, and after that he disappears from sources.

== Sources ==
- Amedroz, Henry F.; Margoliouth, David S., eds. (1921). The Eclipse of the 'Abbasid Caliphate. Original Chronicles of the Fourth Islamic Century, Vol. V: The concluding portion of The Experiences of Nations by Miskawaihi, Vol. II: Reigns of Muttaqi, Mustakfi, Muti and Ta'i. Oxford: Basil Blackwell.
