= Tirdadh =

Tirdadh was the first king of the Gilites, ruling during an unknown date between the 9th and 10th-century. He was succeeded by Lili ibn al-Nu'man. Tirdadh had a son named Harusindan, who would later succeed Lili ibn al-Nu'man as the new ruler of the Gilites.

== Sources ==
- Madelung, W. (1975). "The Minor Dynasties of Northern Iran". In Frye, R. N. (ed.). The Cambridge History of Iran, Volume 4: From the Arab Invasion to the Saljuqs. Cambridge: Cambridge University Press. pp. 198–249. ISBN 978-0-521-20093-6.

Preceded by	King of the Gilites ???–10th-century	Succeeded by Lili ibn al-Nu'man
