= Al-Badi' al-Asturlabi =

Medieval Arab astrologer

Al-Badīʿ al-Asṭurlābī
- Died: 534 AH (1139–40)

Academic work
- Main interests: physician, philosopher, astronomer and poet

Badīʿ Al-Zaman Abu al-Qasim Hibatallah Ibn Al-Ḥusayn (Arabic: بديع الزمان أبوالقاسم هبة الله بن الحسين البديع الأسطرلابي) more commonly known as al-Badīʿ al-Asṭurlābī, was a prominent medieval Arab physician, philosopher, astronomer, and poet of the Islamic Golden Age.

== Biography ==
Al-Badi' al-Asturlabi birth place and date is unknown. He is recorded to have lived in Isfahan in 510 AH (1116–7 AD) and was in contact with the Christian Arab physician Ibn al-Tilmidh (1074–1165). At a later date he moved to the city of Baghdad, where most of his achievements occurred. He is mostly renowned for designing and creating astronomical instruments, astrolabes and as an astrologer. His most well known scientific achievement is his construction and description of an astrolabe that he called (al-kurah dhat al-kursi) an astrolabe which could be used for all latitudes. The only surviving work of his is a book by the name of Kitab al-'amal bil Kurah (On the use of the Spherical astrolabe).

== See also ==
- List of pre-modern Arab scientists and scholars
