= Sayf al-Dawla (disambiguation) =

Sayf al-Dawla (Arabic: سيف الدولة, lit. 'Sword of the Dynasty/State') was the honorific epithet of Ali ibn Abu'l-Hayja Abdallah, Hamdanid emir of Aleppo in 945–967.

Sayf al-Dawla may also refer to:

- Buluggin ibn Ziri, first Zirid emir of Ifriqiya, 972–984
- Khalaf ibn Mula'ib, emir of Apamea and Homs, 1082–1090/91 and 1095/96–1106
- Sayf al-Dawla ibn Hud al-Mustansir, Andalusian adventurer, briefly ruler of Córdoba in 1145
- Saif ud Daulah or Najabut Ali Khan, Nawab of Bengal, 1766–1770
- Sayf ol-Dowleh an Iranian prince of Qajar dynasty, governor of Isfahan, 1820-1835
- Abd al-Malik al-Muzaffar, an 'Amirid ruler of Al-Andalus, 1002-1008
- Zafadola (Sayf al-Dawla), ruler of Murcia and Valencia, 1145–1146
