= Bahram ibn Ardashir al-Majusi =

Bahram ibn Ardashir al-Majusi was a Buyid officer of Zoroastrian extraction who during his early career served the Buyid ruler Adud al-Dawla, and then later the latter's son Samsam al-Dawla.

== Biography ==
Bahram was the son of a certain Ardashir and belonged to a Zoroastrian family. He is first mentioned as one of the secretaries of the Buyid king Adud al-Dawla, and in 976/7 acted as a negotiator for the latter; after Adud al-Dawla had defeated his cousin Izz al-Dawla at Ahvaz, Bahram was sent to negotiate with Izz al-Dawla and gave the latter permission to retire and settle in Syria, then under Hamdanid control.

However, on his way to Syria, Izz al-Dawla became convinced by Abu Taghlib, the Hamdanid ruler of Mosul, to go fight again against his cousin. On May 29, 978, Izz al-Dawla along with Abu Taghlib invaded the domains of his Adud al-Dawla and fought against him near Samarra. Bahram also participated in this war; Izz al-Dawla was once again defeated and was captured and executed at the orders of Adud al-Dawla.

Bahram along with the rest of the Buyid army then marched to Mosul and captured the city, which forced Abu Taghlib to flee to Byzantine territory in Anzitene where he asked for aid. Meanwhile, the Buyid army was completing the conquest of Diyar Bakr and Diyar Mudar; The important Hamdanid city of Mayyafariqin was shortly captured by them, which forced Abu Taghlib to flee to Rahba from where he tried to negotiate peace with Adud al-Dawla.

During the same period, Bahram along with other Buyid officers, were sent to arrest Izz al-Dawla's former vizier Ibn Baqiyya. In 983, Bahram was sent under an army to fight the Kurdish Marwanid ruler Abu Shuja Badh but was defeated. During the reign of Adud al-Dawla's son Samsam al-Dawla, Bahram served as his deputy, but was executed in 986.

== Sources ==
- Donohue, John J. (2003). The Buwayhid Dynasty in Iraq 334 H./945 to 403 H./1012: Shaping Institutions for the Future. Leiden and Boston: Brill. ISBN 90-04-12860-3.
- Kennedy, Hugh (2004). The Prophet and the Age of the Caliphates: The Islamic Near East from the 6th to the 11th Century (Second ed.). Harlow: Longman. ISBN 978-0-582-40525-7.
- Kraemer, Joel L. (1992). Humanism in the Renaissance of Islam: The Cultural Revival During the Buyid Age. BRILL. ISBN 9789004097360.
- Turner, John P. (2006). "'Adud al-Dawla". Medieval Islamic Civilization: A-K, index. Taylor & Francis. p. 16. ISBN 9780415966917.
