= Ibn Marzuban =

Persian official and physician

Abu Ahmad 'Abd al-Rahman ibn 'Ali ibn Marzuban Tabib Marzubani, better simply known as Ibn Marzuban (Persian: ابن مرزبان), was a Persian official and physician who served the Buyids. He was a disciple of Avicenna.

Not much is known about him; he traced his descent back to a family native to Isfahan. However, during the most of his lifetime he lived in Baghdad and in Khuzestan instead of his native city. During his early life, he was educated in science and religious law. He later became the judge of Shushtar and the head of the famous al-'Adudi Hospital in Baghdad. Ibn Marzuban later died in 1006 at Shushtar.

== Sources ==
- Dunlop, D. M. (1997). "EBN MARZOBĀN, ABŪ AḤMAD ʿABD-AL-RAḤMĀN". Encyclopaedia Iranica, Vol. VIII, Fasc. 1. D. M. Dunlop. p. 39.
