= Muhammad ibn Ilyas =

10th-century Emir of Ilyasid dynasty

- Emir of Ilyasid dynasty
- Reign: 932–967/968
- Successor: Ilyasa ibn Muhammad
- Born: Unknown; Sogdia
- Died: 967/968; Bukhara
- House: Ilyasid
- Father: Ilyas
- Religion: Sunni Islam

Abu 'Ali Muhammad ibn Ilyas (Persian: ابوعلی محمد بن الیاس; died 967 or 968) was the Ilyasid ruler of northern Kerman from 932 until 967. For over thirty years he was able to maintain a virtually independent territory against his aggressive neighbors, the Samanids and Buyids.

== Establishment of rule in Kerman ==
Muhammad is first mentioned as a commander in the service of the Samanids. In 929 he was imprisoned after angering the Samanid amir, Nasr ibn Ahmad. He was freed after receiving the support of Nasr's vizier Abu'l-Fadl al-Bal'ami and was sent on a campaign in Gurgan. At this point Muhammad joined a rebellion started by Nasr's brothers, headed by Yahya ibn Ahmad. As the rebels began to lose Muhammad traveled to Nishapur but was not allowed into the city by its governor, Makan ibn Kaki. Muhammad entered into Makan's service but when the latter left for Gurgan, he allowed the rebel Yahya into Nishapur.

In 932, Nasr's army approached Nishapur, and Yahya's supporters fled. Muhammad made his way to Kerman, a province loosely in the hands of the Abbasids. He was able to establish his authority in the northern portion of Kerman; the southern and eastern parts were inhabited by the Qufs and Baluch tribes, who maintained their autonomy.

== Battle with the Samanids and Buyids ==
In 934, Nasr sent Makan b. Kaki against Muhammad. The Ilyasid attempted to gain the support of the Abbasid general Yaqut but failed, was defeated by Makan and forced to flee. In 935/936 Makan was summoned by Nasr's governor of Khurasan, the Muhtajid Muhammad b. al-Muzaffar, to assist him in fighting the Ziyarids. After Makan left Muhammad returned to Kerman, and after battling the Samanid garrisons left behind by Makan restored his position there.

Meanwhile, in Fars, the Buyids had come to power in 934. Two years later 'Ali sent his younger brother Ahmad to Kerman to take over the province. The Samanids remaining in Kerman withdrew, and Muhammad decided to head to Sistan rather than fight the Buyids. Ahmad soon ran into trouble with the Qufs and Baluch, however, and in one battle with them was seriously wounded. He gradually gained some ground against them, and defeated Muhammad when he returned from Kerman, but eventually 'Ali decided to recall Ahmad from the province. This withdrawal allowed Muhammad to reestablish himself in Kerman.

== Rule in Kerman ==
Little is said of Muhammad and Kerman for the next thirty years. He may have acknowledged either the Samanids or the Buyids as his overlords, although in 959 or 960 the caliph sent him a banner and robe, objects signifying the status of an independent ruler. Muhammad reportedly ruled as a brigand, plundering the caravans coming from Fars, and gained a large amount of wealth. He was also active in creating building projects and giving money to charities.

Muhammad was traveling to the territory of the Qufs to collect his share of plunder that the Qufs had gained from a caravan when he suffered a stroke. As he was paralyzed by the stroke, he made plans for the succession. His son Ilyasa was made his heir and given command of the army, while Ilyas was put next in line.

Muhammad was on bad terms with a third son, Suleiman, who was sent to the Ilyasids' native Sughd and instructed to take command of the family properties there. Suleiman left, but instead of going to Sughd went to the Qufs and received the tribute that they owed his father. He then raised an army from the Qufs and took control of the town of Sirajan, of which he had previously been governor. The army under Ilyasa was sent by Muhammad against him, and after some fighting Suleiman fled to Khurasan. Sirajan was then plundered.

== Abdication and death ==
Meanwhile, relations between Muhammad and Ilyasa became strained as various people at court turned Muhammad against his son. He dismissed Ilyasa from the army command and had him imprisoned (this was not the first time the two had been in conflict with one another; a previous quarrel had forced Ilyasa to temporary flee to Buyid Fars). The mothers of Ilyasa and Ilyas, however, eventually freed Ilyasa, who gained the support of the army. Faced with little choice, Muhammad agreed to abdicate, allowing Ilyasa to succeed him.

Muhammad was allowed to leave with all his wealth. He made his way to Bukhara, where Suleiman was as well. While there, he urged the Samanid amir Mansur b. Nuh to take action against the Ziyarids and Buyids. He died soon afterwards, either in 967 or 968.

== Sources ==
- Bosworth, C. E. "The Banu Ilyas of Kirman." Iran and Islam. Edited by C. E. Bosworth. Edinburgh: Edinburgh University Press, 1971. ISBN 978-0-85224-200-1
- Kabir, Mazifullah. The Buwayhid dynasty of Baghdad, 334/946-447/1055. Calcutta: Iran Society, 1964.
