= Ibn al-Tilmidh =

Syriac Christian physician, pharmacist, poet, musician and calligrapher

Ibn al-Tilmīdh ابن التلمیذ
- Born: Habbat-allah Ibn Said أبو الحسن هبة الله بن صاعد بن هبة الله بن إبراهيم البغدادى النصرانى; 1074; Baghdad, Abbasid Caliphate, now Iraq
- Died: 11 April 1165 (aged 92); Baghdad, Abbasid Caliphate, now Iraq
- Occupations: Physician, Pharmacist, Poet, musician, Calligrapher, As physician in Al-'Adudi Hospital, Baghdad, now Iraq, Personal physician of Caliph Al-Mustadi
- Writing career
- Notable works: Marginal commentary on Avicenna's The Canon of Medicine, Al-Aqrābādhīn al-Kabir, Maqālah fī al-faṣd

Amīn al-Dawla Abu'l-Ḥasan Hibat Allāh ibn Ṣaʿīd ibn al-Tilmīdh (Arabic: هبة الله بن صاعد ابن التلميذ; 1074 – 11 April 1165) was a Christian Arab physician, pharmacist, poet, musician and calligrapher of the medieval Islamic civilization.

== Life ==
Ibn al-Tilmidh worked at the ʻAḍudī hospital in Baghdad where he eventually became its chief physician as well as court physician to the caliph Al-Mustadi, and in charge of licensing physicians in Baghdad. He mastered the Arabic, Persian, Greek and Syriac languages. Al-Tilmidh was a friend of the Muslim scientist al-Badīʿ al-Asṭurlābī with whom he frequently sided against Abu'l-Barakat.

First page of Al-Aqrābādhīn al-Kabir

He compiled several medical works, the most influential being Al-Aqrābādhīn al-Kabir, a pharmacopeia which became the standard pharmacological work in the hospitals of the Islamic civilization, superseding an earlier work by Sabur ibn Sahl. His poetry included riddles: Abū al-Maʿālī al-Ḥaẓīrī quotes five of them, and a verse solution by al-Tilmīdh to another riddle, in his Kitāb al-iʿjāz fī l-aḥājī wa-l-alghāz (Inimitable Book on Quizzes and Riddles).

== Works ==
- Marginal commentary on Ibn Sina's "Canon"
- Al-Aqrābādhīn al-Kabir
- Maqālah fī al-faṣd
