= Al-'Adudi Hospital =

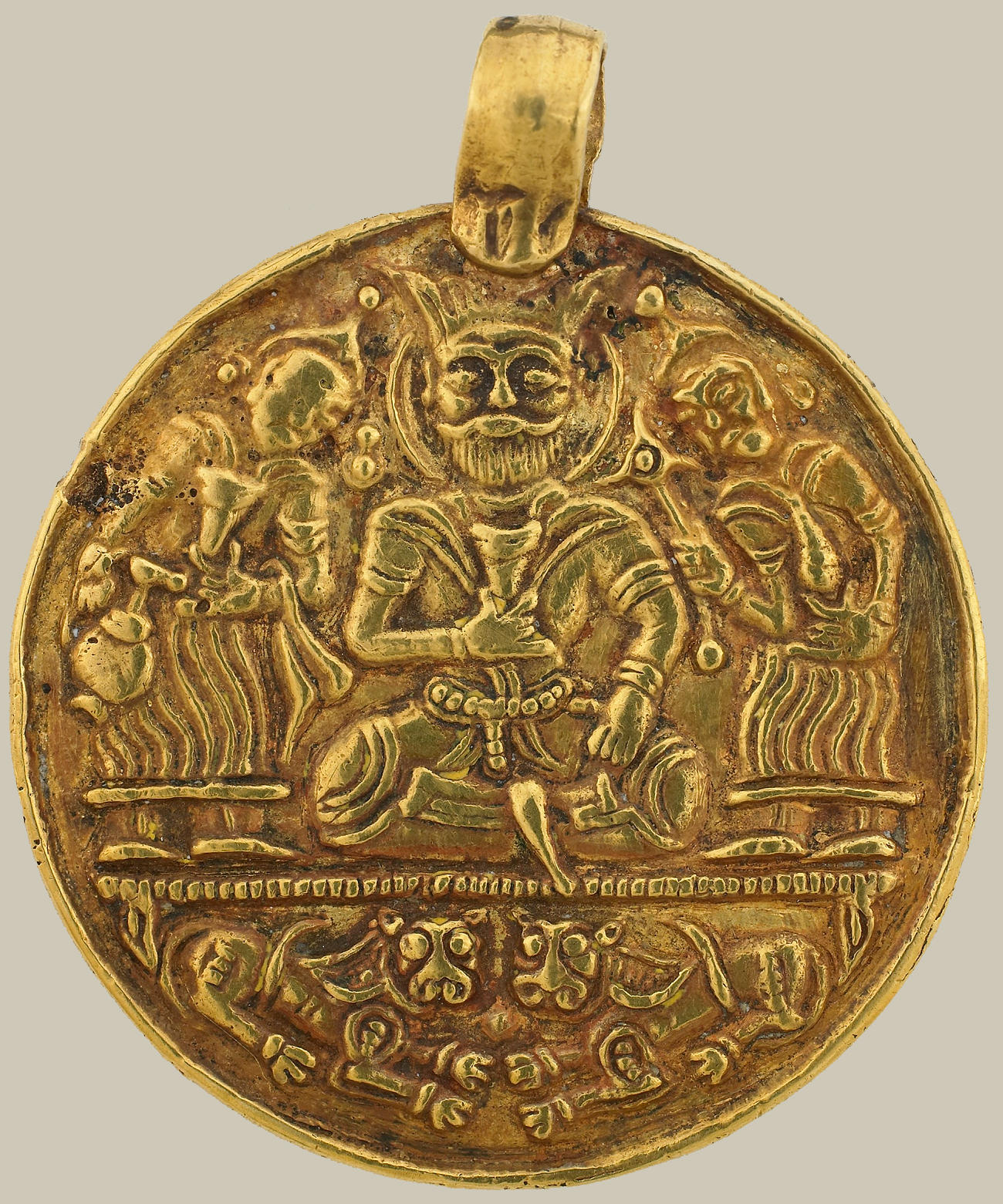
- Medallion depicting King 'Adud al-Dawla, patron of Al-'Adudi Hospital

Geography
- Location: Baghdad, Iraq
- Coordinates: 33°21′N 44°22′E

Organisation
- Type: Teaching
- Patron: 'Adud al-Dawla

History
- Opened: 981
- Demolished: 1258

Links
- Lists: Hospitals in Iraq

The Al-'Adudi Hospital was established during the era of organized hospitals developed in medieval Islamic culture. Some of these early hospitals were located in Baghdad and among those was the bimaristan Al-'Adudi. The hospital came to be when King of the Buyid Dynasty, 'Adud al-Dawla, decided to construct the hospital a few years before he died. Al-'Adudi was considered one of the most innovative and modern hospitals of the medieval Islamic time period. Amongst well-known physicians of the time period, this hospital was known as an institution for learning and practicing medicine.

== Construction ==
King 'Adud al-Dawla provided the funding for the hospital from the properties that he owned. Before the construction of the building and its quarters, well-known physician, al-Razi, was chosen to decide the ideal location for Al-'Adudi. In order to make the appropriate choice, it is said that different areas of the city were tested by hanging meat and choosing the place that resulted in the minimal amount of decay of the meat. The site lay on the highest part of the west bank of the Tigris River. It was thus removed from the stagnant air and insects that infested the lower river bank. For this reason, it had previously been chosen as the location of the Khuld Palace, built in the 8th century by Caliph al-Mansur. The completion of the construction of Al-'Adudi was in 981 AD.

The Al-'Adudi Hospital was reconstructed twice after its initial development. The first time the Al-'Adudi was destroyed occurred in 1068 due to a flood of the Tigris. After it was rebuilt, it is said the hospital improved in its facilities and the care provided to patients. However, visitors who passed through the hospital shared that Al-'Adudi did not actually treat patients with the same quality care. Some shared that the physicians only visited patients a couple times a week. The Al-'Adudi Hospital was destroyed for the second time during the Siege of Baghdad in 1258. The hospital was not rebuilt for a third time.

== Medical institution ==
Al-'Adudi served as more than a place in which infections were cured. The hospital was both a medical institution and an institution for learning medicine. As it was a Bimaristan, it served individuals of all backgrounds regardless of sex and other identities. Males and females were treated at the hospital by expert physicians of different areas of medicine that created set plans for patients. In Al-'Adudi, there were twenty-four physicians hired as well as nurses that cared for patients that shared the same sex. After the second construction of Al-'Adudi, the number of physicians increased to twenty-eight. Among the physicians, were specialists such as surgeons, ophthalmologists, orthopedics, oculists and future physicians. Some of the physicians cared for patients and also taught students of medicine. A traveler named, Ibn Jubayr, is said to have described the hospital to be made of many quarters that had large rooms for different purposes. Al-'Adudi was said to resemble characteristics of palaces. It also held some of the most recent pharmaceutical developments. Although the Al-'Adudi Hospital had its main location of function and work for physicians, Ibn Sina, who was a leader and well-known physician, asked that prisons also schedule organized regular medical checkups for the prisoners. He gave the physician, Sinan bin Thabit, the job to assign medical officers frequent visits to the prisons.

== Learning institution ==
The way of learning for medical students today is similar when compared to the approach for learning medicine in early Islamic hospitals. Al-'Adudi was among the first hospitals that emphasized the importance for medical students to have direct contact with patients. Al-'Adudi began as one of the hospitals that would work as a place in which students could learn and practice their specialty. The education of medicine became significant during the period of hospitals like Al-'Adudi for the goal of having students move beyond the classroom. Al-'Adudi was modeled after hospitals like those in Jundi-Shapur. Medical students in Al-'Adudi were able to participate in rounds, attend lectures, and have discussions with other medical professionals. As there were physicians of different areas of expertise, students were, for example, able to view the skills of surgeons who practiced in optometry and orthopedics among other areas of medicine. One way in which the medical knowledge of students was assessed would be by directly asking students questions relating to the medical conditions of the patients in their presence. Among the physicians that taught and assessed students was Hibat Allah Ibn al-Tilmidh.

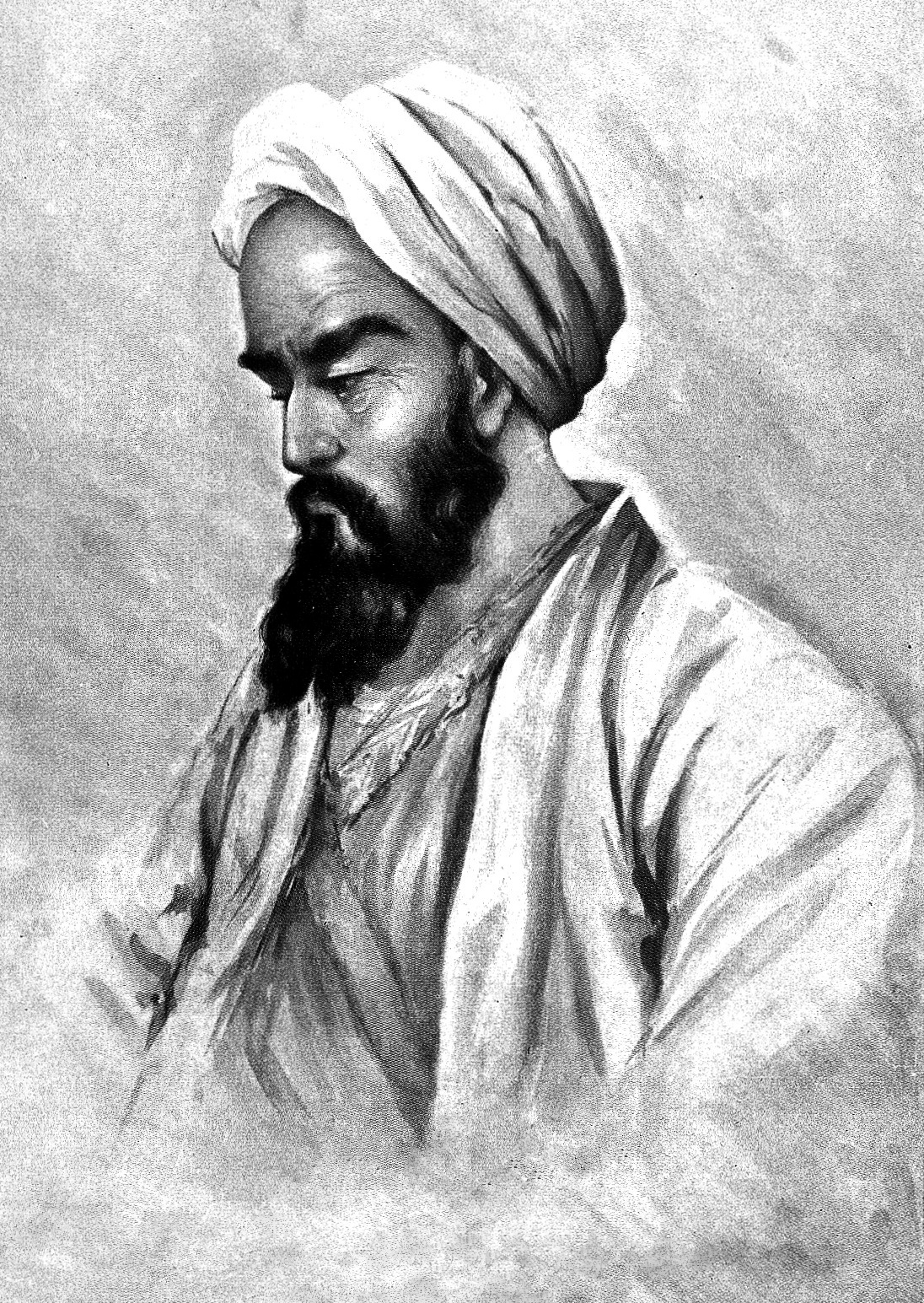
Portrait of physician known as Rhazes (Al-Razi). He was involved in choosing the location of the 'Al-Adudi Hospital.

== Physicians ==
There were numerous experts of medicine throughout the existence of Al-'Adudi that helped the hospital from the beginning of its founding until the end. Among those were Al-Razi, who helped King 'Adud al-Dawla choose the location of the hospital. Before the death of King 'Adud al-Dawla, Ibn Mandevaih worked under his reign for a salary. During Ibn Mandevaih's time at 'Al-Adudi, he was able to prove his medical knowledge, which allowed him to work further outside of the hospital. A physician who received his medical education at Al-'Adudi was Ibn Jazlah. He studied under Ibn Hibat Allah and continued his medical career by contributing to the field with works such as Taqwim al-Abdan fi Tadbir al-Insan (The Almanac of Bodily Parts for the Treatment of People). Ibn al-Tilmidh also contributed to Al-'Adudi during the early part of the 12th century in which he served as the chief of the hospital. Among the medical specialists that worked at Al-'Adudi were also Al-Dakhwar (optometrist), Ibn Tufail (surgeon), and Ibn Butlan, who received an education from the institution.

== See also ==
- Bimaristan
- Khuld Palace, the site of the hospital
- Medicine in the medieval Islamic world
