= Sharaf al-Dawla =

10th century Buyid amir of Kerman and Fars

- Amir al-umara
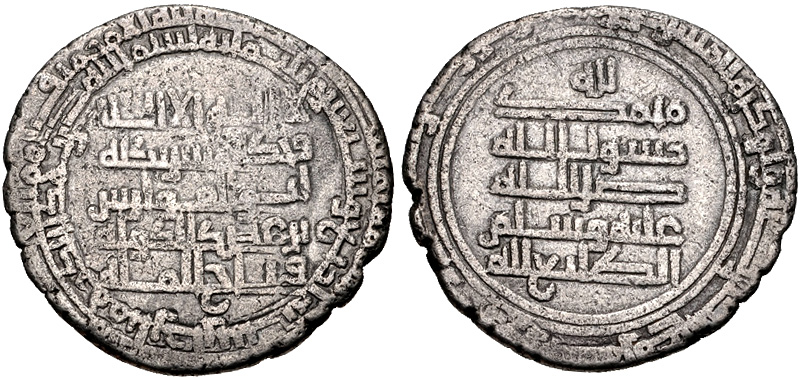
- Coin minted during the reign of Sharaf al-Dawla.

Amir of Fars
- Reign: 983–988/9
- Predecessor: 'Adud al-Dawla
- Successor: Samsam al-Dawla

Amir of Kerman
- Reign: 983–988/9
- Predecessor: 'Adud al-Dawla
- Successor: Samsam al-Dawla

Amir of Iraq
- Reign: 987–988/9
- Predecessor: Samsam al-Dawla
- Successor: Baha' al-Dawla

Amir of Jazira
- Predecessor: Samsam al-Dawla
- Successor: Baha' al-Dawla
- Born: c. 960
- Died: September 7, 988 or September 6, 989
Names
- Shirdil Abu'l-Fawaris
- House: Buyid
- Father: 'Adud al-Dawla
- Religion: Twelver Shia Islam

Shirdil Abu'l-Fawaris (Arabic: شيردل أبو الفوارس) (c. 960-September 7, 988 or September 6, 989) was the Buyid amir of Kerman and Fars (983-988/9), as well as Iraq (987-988/9). He was the eldest son of 'Adud al-Dawla.

== Early life ==
When Kerman was conquered by his father in 968, Shirdil was appointed as viceroy to that province. For some time after 977 he resided in Baghdad, but was then sent back to Kerman. As the eldest son, Shirdil regarded himself as the successor to his father; 'Adud al-Dawla's apparent preference for his second son Marzuban therefore made him hostile toward his brother. 'Adud al-Dawla never definitively named a successor by the time of his death in 983. Marzuban (now Samsam al-Dawla) took power in Baghdad as senior amir, but Shirdil also laid his claims to the succession, and from Kerman he invaded and captured Fars.

== Reign ==
Shirdil, who now used the title "Sharaf al-Dawla" (شرف الدولة), soon found his position surrounded by enemies. In the west, Samsam al-Dawla ruled in Baghdad, while two more of his brothers, Taj al-Dawla and Diya' al-Dawla, were in control of Basra and Khuzestan. To the north, Fakhr al-Dawla ruled in Ray. The next few years were spent by Sharaf al-Dawla fighting against all of these individuals. He provided support to the Samanids when Fakhr al-Dawla attempted to wrest Khorasan from them. Despite this, the rulers of Basra and Khuzestan soon acknowledged Fakhr al-Dawla as senior amir, making the latter the most powerful of the Buyids.

Despite this turn of events, Sharaf al-Dawla was able to expand his position. He recovered Buyid Oman, which had earlier seceded to Samsam al-Dawla. In early 986 he captured Basra and Khuzestan, forcing the two brothers to flee to Fakhr al-Dawla's territory. He then took on Samsam al-Dawla; by May or June 986 the latter recognized Sharaf al-Dawla as senior amir. Sharaf al-Dawla probably intended to invade Fakhr al-Dawla's realm, but Iraq soon slipped into anarchy and he was forced to intervene there. He entered Baghdad in 987, deposed Samsam al-Dawla and imprisoned him along with his official Fuladh ibn Manadhar in Fars. He also had the Daylamite officer Ziyar ibn Shahrakawayh executed. In July of that year the caliph proclaimed Sharaf senior amir.

Sharaf al-Dawla next planned to subdue the Kurd Badr ibn Hasanwayh, who had taken over Diyarbakr during Samsam al-Dawla's reign and was an ally of Fakhr al-Dawla. The campaign failed, and not long afterwards Sharaf al-Dawla died, either in 988 or 989. He had managed to mostly preserve 'Adud al-Dawla's empire, but the Buyids of Ray under Fakhr al-Dawla had become effectively independent. He was succeeded by his brother Baha' al-Dawla, but Samsam al-Dawla escaped from prison and captured Fars, Kerman and Khuzestan.

== Sources ==
- Bosworth, C. E. (1975). "Iran under the Buyids". In Frye, R. N. (ed.). The Cambridge History of Iran, Volume 4: From the Arab Invasion to the Saljuqs. Cambridge: Cambridge University Press. pp. 250–305. ISBN 0-521-20093-8.
- Nagel, Tilman (1990). "BUYIDS". Encyclopaedia Iranica, Vol. IV, Fasc. 6. London u.a.: Routledge & Kegan Paul. pp. 578–586.

Preceded by 'Adud al-Dawla	Buyid Amir (in Kerman & Fars); 983–988/9	Succeeded by Samsam al-Dawla
Preceded by Samsam al-Dawla	Buyid Amir (in Iraq); 987–988/9	Succeeded by Baha' al-Dawla
