= King of the Gilites =

The King of the Gilites (also spelled King of the Jil/Gil) was a title used by the rulers of Dakhel and its surroundings. The kingdom was mostly ruled by the Gilite Shahanshahvand clan.

== Sources ==
- Madelung, W. (1975). "The Minor Dynasties of Northern Iran". In Frye, R. N. (ed.). The Cambridge History of Iran, Volume 4: From the Arab Invasion to the Saljuqs. Cambridge: Cambridge University Press. pp. 198–249. ISBN 978-0-521-20093-6.
- Madelung, W. "GĪLĀN iv. History in the Early Islamic Period". Encyclopaedia Iranica, Online Edition.
