= Dakhel =

Village in Gilan province, Iran

Dakhel Persian: داخل
- Village
- Location within Iran
- Coordinates: 37°16′21″N 49°59′16″E
- Country: Iran
- Province: Gilan
- County: Astaneh-ye Ashrafiyeh
- District: Central
- Rural District: Dehshal

Population (2016)
  - Total: 901
- Time zone: UTC+3:30 (IRST)

Dakhel (Persian: داخل) (Note: Also romanized as Dākhel) is a village in Dehshal Rural District of the Central District in Astaneh-ye Ashrafiyeh County, Gilan province, Iran.

== Demographics ==
=== Population ===
At the time of the 2006 National Census, the village's population was 1,118 in 331 households. The following census in 2011 counted 1,042 people in 348 households. The 2016 census measured the population of the village as 901 people in 343 households.
