= Diya al-Dawla =

Buyid Amir of Basra in 980s

Abu Tahir Firuzshah (Persian: ابو طاهر فیروز شاه), better known by his laqab of Diya' al-Dawla, was the Buyid ruler of Basra during the 980s. He was the son of 'Adud al-Dawla.

== History ==
Abu Tahir Firuzshah was the son of Adud al-Dawla and a daughter of Manadhar, who was a Justanid king. Following 'Adud al-Dawla's death in 983, his possessions were divided between his sons. Samsam al-Dawla, who was the presumed successor of 'Adud al-Dawla, took power, but Sharaf al-Dawla took advantage of his position in Kerman to invade Fars. This invasion distracted Samsam al-Dawla and gave Abu Tahir Firuzshah the ability to set up his own independent rule in Basra, where he took the title of Diya' al-Dawla.

Diya' al-Dawla, as well as another brother, Taj al-Dawla, who controlled Khuzestan, eventually decided to acknowledge the authority of Fakhr al-Dawla, who ruled in Jibal. This was done in an attempt to protect themselves from the conflict between Samsam al-Dawla and Sharaf al-Dawla; Basra and Khuzestan were situated in between the possessions of the two and were therefore vulnerable. Nevertheless, after a few years Sharaf al-Dawla invaded and occupied Basra and Khuzestan, causing the two princes to flee to Fakhr al-Dawla's territory. There they found refuge in Ray. Neither of the two brothers managed to found any lasting line; consequently their role in Buyid politics was short.

Preceded by 'Adud al-Dawla	Buyid Ruler (in Basra); 980s	Succeeded by Sharaf al-Dawla
