= Taj al-Dawla =

Abu'l-Husain Ahmad (Persian: ابوالحسین احمد), better known by his laqab of Taj al-Dawla (Arabic: تاج الدولة،, "Crown of the Dynasty"), was the Buyid ruler of Khuzestan during the 980s. He was the son of 'Adud al-Dawla.

== Biography ==
Abu'l-Husain was the son of Adud al-Dawla and the daughter of Manadhar, who was a Justanid king. Following 'Adud al-Dawla's death in 983, his possessions were divided between his sons. Samsam al-Dawla, who was the presumed successor of 'Adud al-Dawla, took power, but Sharaf al-Dawla took advantage of his position in Kerman to invade Fars. This invasion provided Abu'l-Husain with the opportunity to set up his rule in Ahvaz, and took the title of Taj al-Dawla.

Taj al-Dawla, as well as another brother, Diya' al-Dawla, who controlled Basra, eventually decided to acknowledge the authority of Fakhr al-Dawla, who ruled in Jibal. This was done in an attempt to protect themselves from the conflict between Samsam al-Dawla and Sharaf al-Dawla. Nevertheless, after a few years Sharaf al-Dawla invaded and occupied Khuzestan and Basra, causing the two princes to flee to Fakhr al-Dawla's territory. There they found refuge in Ray. Neither of the two brothers managed to found any lasting line; consequently their role in Buyid politics was short.

Preceded by 'Adud al-Dawla	Buyid Ruler (in Khuzestan); 980s	Succeeded by Sharaf al-Dawla
