= Ibn Faris =

Persian linguist (died 1004)

- أبو الحسين أحمد بن فارس بن زكريا الرازي
- Born: 0940; Qazvin, Persia (modern-day Iran)
- Died: 1004; Ray (near modern Tehran, Iran)
- Movement: Early philological school; method of isytiqq (derivation of word roots)

Academic background
- Influences: Khalīl ibn Aḥmad al‑Farāhīdī

Academic work
- Era: Islamic Golden Age
- Main interests: Arabic lexicography, philology, grammar, poetry, literature, hadith, jurisprudence
- Notable works: Mujmal fi al-Lugha, Maqāyīs al-Lugha, Al‑Ṣāḥibī fī fiqh al‑lugha, Dhamm al‑khata’ fī al‑shi‘r
- Influenced: Al‑Fīrūzābādī

Ibn Faris (Arabic: أبو الحسين أحمد بن فارس بن زكريا بن محمد بن حبيب الرازي, Abū al-Ḥusayn Aḥmad ibn Fāris ibn Zakariyyā ibn Muḥammad ibn Ḥabīb al-Rāzī, died Ray, Iran 395/1004) was a Persian linguist, scribe, scholar, philologist and lexicographer, As well as bearing the epithet al-Rāzī ('meaning 'from Ray'), ibn Fāris was also known variously by the epithets al-Shāfiʿī, al-Mālikī, al-lughawī ('the linguist'), al-naḥwī ('the grammarian'), al-Qazwīnī ('from Qazvin') and (possibly inaccurately) al-Zahrāwī ('from al-Zahrāʾ'). He is noted for compiling two of the early dictionaries to organise words alphabetically rather than according to the word's rhyming pattern. He was primarily associated with Ray. Initially, he was an adherent of the Shafi'i madhhab, but later switched to the Maliki.

== Life ==
Although some sources ascribe precise dates and places of birth to ibn Faris, including 329 AH/941 CE in Kursuf, in the district of al-Zahrāʾ, modern scholars conclude that this cannot be known. His father was Fāris ibn Zakariyyāʾ, who was perhaps a faqīh and who certainly gave ibn Fāris some of his education, passing on to him ibn al-Sikkīt's Kitāb al-Manṭiq.

Ibn Fāris studied in Qazvin, where his teachers included ʿAlī ibn Ibrāhīm al-Qaṭṭān (d. 345/956). He also studied in Zanjān (making the acquaintance of Abū Bakr Aḥmad ibn al-Khaṭīb), Baghdad, and, while undertaking hajj, in Mecca.

Little is known about his family's origins or social status. According to his own account, his father was an educated man.

He was probably raised in Hamadan. where he achieved great fame as a scholar and writer. In Hamadan, he took on many students, one of whom was Al-Hamadhani, who became the celebrated poet and originator of the Maqamat. He was educated at Qazvin, Hamadan and Baghdad

Based in Hamadan and attached to ibn al-ʿAmīd, ibn Fāris became well known for his scholarship, teaching al-Ṣāḥib ibn ʿAbbād (to whom he gave the Kitāb al-Ḥajar) and Badīʿ al-Zamān al-Hamadhānī, though he came to have a bad relationship with each. Nevertheless, he was chosen to be to be tutor to Majd al-Dawla, son of Fakhr al-Dawla in Ray, and dedicated to his employer his book al-Ṣāḥibī.

He relocated to Rayy (now part of Tehran), possibly to take up a position as a tutor to, Majd al-Dawla, the son of the Buyid, Fakhr al-Dawla. At that time, Rayy was a centre of literature, enabling ibn Faris to mix with scholars and men of letters. There ibn Faris, gained favour of the Vizier, Ibn al-Amid, who was a patron of the learning and learned men.

Said to have been kind and humble and an emotive poet, Ibn Fāris is generally accepted to have died in 395/1004, in Ray.

Ibn Fāris specialised in lexicography, but also studied poetry, grammar, Koranic exegesis (tafsīr) and jurisprudence (fiḳh). In the assessment of H. Fleisch, 'Ibn Fāris had an unbiased mind. It is remarkable that in the 4th/10th century, an age dominated grammatically by Sībawayhi and the Baṣrans, he should have returned to the freedom of thought of the Kūfans and should once again have introduced grammatical discussion in his K[itāb] Kifāyat al-mutaʿallimīn fi’k̲h̲tilāf al-naḥwiyyīn'.

Ibn Fāris died in Rayy in 395/1004 (the generally accepted date).

== Works ==
During his lifetime, Ibn Fāris produced many original works on a wide range of subjects: lexicography, grammar, poetry, literature, hadith (the words of the Prophet), the history of the Arabic language, ethics and jurispridence. He is best known for his dictionaries, Mujmal fi al-Lugha [Summary of the Language] and Maqāyīs al-Lugha [Analogical Templates of Language]. He was the first scholar to use the method of isytiqq in which he considers the derivation of words and word roots and shows great ingenuity in tracing the origin of Arabic words. He is generally credited with being the first scholar to organise words in alphabetical order, rather than according to rhyming patterns, as was customary practice at the time.

He has been described as "one of the most original philologists of his time", and "the brightest representative of the philological school".

He wrote some forty works. He also wrote many poems, most of which are now lost or forgotten. Some scholars credit al-Fāris as the originator of the maqamat genre, even before al-Hamadani.

He is best known for his works on lexicography, which was his favourite subject. His most important works include:

1. Kitāb al-mujmal fī al-lugha (Arabic: كتاب المجمل في اللغة, lit. 'Summary of the Language'). A dictionary which traced words with multiple meanings back to their original semantic meaning, analysing and defining classical vocabulary in a clear and concise way, with numerous poetic citations. Words are listed by their first radical consonant, beginning with hamza. The preface says that this work supersedes ibn Fāris's Kitāb al-ʿAyn and Kitāb al-Jīm. The work was influenced by al-Khalīl and in turn influenced al-Fīrūzābādī's Qāmūs.
2. Mu‘jam maqāyīs al-lugha (Arabic: معجم مقاييس اللغة, lit. 'Analogical Templates of Language'). A novel dictionary, inspired by al-Khalīl, which aimed to establish the basic meanings of word-roots, and the semantic connections between their derivatives. But ibn Fāris was committed to a belief that there was no semantic change, but a single divine plan for the form of Arabic, which made his explanations at times convoluted.
3. al-Ṣāḥibī fī fiqh al-lugha wa-sunan al-ʿarab fī kalāmihā (Arabic: الصاحبي في فقه اللغة, lit. 'The Treatise Dedicated to al-Ṣāḥib on the Law of Language and the Use of Speech and Its Use in the Speech of the Arabs'). A novel, small-scale Muzhir, beginning to attempt a comprehensive account of Arab ideas about Arabic lexicography, grammar, and history, arguing for the superiority of the Arabic language. Dedicated to Sahib ibn Abbad and described as "a masterpiece".
4. Dhamm al-khata’ fī al-shi‘r (Arabic: ذم الخطأ في الشعر, lit. 'Reproving Mistakes Made in Poetry'). A polemic concerning the pretentious uses of language by certain tenth-century poets.

Other works that have been attributed to ibn Fāris are:

1. Kitāb al-itbā‘ wa-al-muzāwaja (Arabic: الإتباع والمزاوجة), a collection of words, always used in pairs, of the same pattern.
2. Ikhtilāf al-naḥwiyyīn (Arabic: اختلاف النحويين, lit. 'Disagreements of the Grammarians')
3. Kitāb akhlāq al-nabī (Arabic: كتاب أخلاق النبي, lit. 'The Character of the Prophet')
4. al-Ifrād (Arabic: الإفراد, lit. 'The Grammatical Singular')
5. al-Amālī (Arabic: الأمالي, lit. 'Dictations')
6. Amthilat al-asjā’ (Arabic: أمثلة الأسجاع, lit. 'Examples of Rhymed Prose')
7. Kitāb al-intiṣār li-tha‘lab (Arabic: الانتصار لثعلب, lit. 'A Defense of Tha‘lab'), perhaps identical to the Kitāb Kifāyat al-mutaʿallimīn fi’khtilāf al-naḥwiyyīn below.
8. al-Tāj (Arabic: التاج, lit. 'The Crown')
9. Tafsīr asmā’ al-nabī (Arabic: تفسير أسماء النبي صلى الله عليه وسلم, lit. 'An Explanation of the Names of the Prophet')
10. Tamām faṣīḥ al-kalām (Arabic: تمام فصيح الكلام, lit. 'The Perfection of Eloquent Speech')
11. Jāmi‘ al-ta’wīl (Arabic: جامع التأويل, lit. 'A Compendium of Qur'anic Interpretations')
12. al-Ḥajr (Arabic: الحجر, lit. 'The Interdiction')
13. Ḥilyat al-fuqahā’ (Arabic: حلية الفقهاء, lit. 'The Adornment of the Jurists')
14. al-Ḥamāsa al-muḥdatha (Arabic: الحماسة المحدثة)
15. Khalq al-insān (Arabic: خلق الإنسان, lit. 'The Physical Constitution of Man')
16. دارات العرب
17. ذم الغيبة
18. رائع الدرر ورائق الزهر في أخبار خير البشر
19. Arabic: سيرة النبي صلى الله عليه وسلم (وصفه ياقوت بأنه كتاب صغير الحجم) (Kitāb Sīrat al-Nabī).
20. Arabic: رسالة الزهري إلى عبد الملك بن مروان (Risāla against Abū ʿAmr Muḥammad ibn Saʿīd), supporting the modern movement in Arabic poetry against the supporters of the ancients (quoted in al-Thaʿālibī's Yatīmat al-dahr).
21. الشِيات والحلى، ليس كما يعتقد أنه الثياب والحلى
22. Arabic: كفاية المتعلمين في اختلاف النحويين (Kitāb Kifāyat al-mutaʿallimīn fi’khtilāf al-naḥwiyyīn)
23. قصص النهار وسمر الليل
24. اليشكريات (منها جزء بالمكتبة الظاهرية)
25. Arabic: مقالة كلا وما جاء منها في كتاب الله (Maqālat kallā wa-mā jāʿa minhā fī Kitāb Allāh).
26. مختصر في المؤنث والمذكر
27. مقدمة في النحو (ذكره ابن الأنباري)
28. Arabic: اللامات (منه جزء بالمكتبة الظاهرية) (Kitāb al-Lāmāt), on the grammatical usage of la- and li-.
29. غريب إعراب القرآن
30. العم والخال (ذكره ياقوت الحموي)
31. Arabic: فتيا فقيه العرب (Kitāb Futyā faḳīh al-ʿArab), a series of puzzles based on Islamic law and rare meanings of words.
32. الفرق (بسكون الراء)
33. الفريدة والخريدة
34. الليل والنهار
35. مأخذ العلم (ذكره ابن حجر في المجمع)
36. Arabic: متخير الألفاظ (بتشديد الياء وفتحها) (Mutakhayyar al-alfāẓ), a lexicographical work including post-classical vocabulary drawing on al-Khalīl and Ibn Durayd.
37. مسائل في اللغة
38. مقدمة في الفرائض
39. Arabic: النيروز (نسخته في مكتبة تيمور باشا منتسخة من المكتبة الظاهرية) (Kitāb al-Nayrūz), a study of the etymology of the word nayrūz and of other Arabic words on the pattern fayʿūl.
40. نعت الشعر أو نقد الشعر.
41. The Kitāb Abyāt al-istishhād, an anthology of verse lines which can be deployed as proverbs, is not listed as being by ibn Fāris in medieval sources, but has been attributed to him. Another suggestion is that this work is actually the Kitāb Dhakhāʾir al-kalimāt by one Yāqūt.

== See also ==
- Bibliography of encyclopedias
- Encyclopedia
- Lexicography
- List of encyclopedias by date
- Persian literature
- Philology

== Sources ==
- Bosworth, C. E. (1975). "Iran under the Buyids". In Frye, Richard N. (ed.). The Cambridge History of Iran: From the Arab Invasion to the Saljuqs. Vol. 4. Cambridge: Cambridge University Press. pp. 250–304. ISBN 0-521-20093-8.
