= Badr ibn Hasanwayh =

Kurdish ruler of the Hasanwayhid dynasty

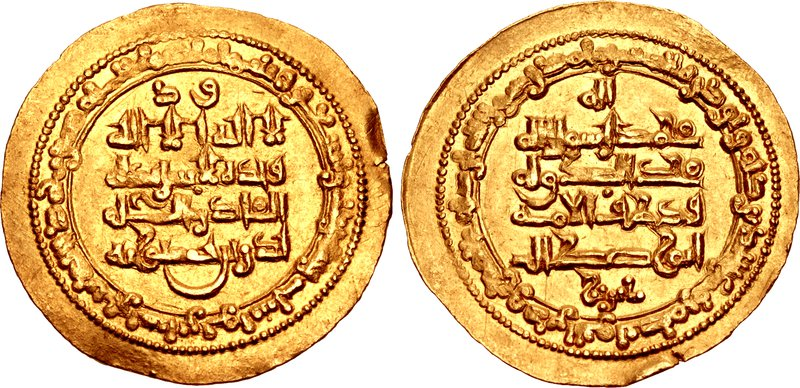
- Gold dinar of Badr ibn Hasanwayh, minted at Sabur-Khwast in 1005 or 1006

Ruler of the Hasanwayhids
- Reign: 979–1014
- Predecessor: Hasanwayh
- Successor: Zahir ibn Hilal ibn Badr
- Died: 1014
- Issue: Hilal ibn Badr
- Dynasty: Hasanwayhids
- Father: Hasanwayh
- Religion: Shia Islam

Badr ibn Hasanwayh was the second ruler of the Hasanwayhids from 979 to 1014. He was the son and successor of Hasanwayh (r. 961–979).

== Biography ==
During the civil war between the two Buyid brothers Adud al-Dawla (r. 949–983) and Izz al-Dawla (r. 967–978), Hasanwayh had supported the latter. Following the death of Hasanwayh in 979, Adud al-Dawla invaded his territories, executed some of his sons, and installed Badr on the Hasanwayhid throne as his deputy over the neighbouring Kurdish territories. Following the death of Adud al-Dawla in 983, Badr showed his gratitude to him by having twenty men sent to on an annual pilgrimage to Mecca in the name of Adud al-Dawla (as well as Badr's parents). Like Adud al-Dawla, historians portray Badr as the ideal ruler, especially in protecting the settled farmers from his own nomad supporters.

Unlike his father, Badr attended many Buyid court meetings. Following the death of the Buyid ruler Fakhr al-Dawla (r. 976–980, 984–997), Badr went to Ray to help Majd al-Dawla (r. 997–1029) administer the local affairs, but his help was rebuffed. As a result, Badr kept gradually dissociating himself from the affairs at Ray.

Badr was killed in 1014 by his commanders during the siege of a Kurdish fortress, due to ignoring their counsel to avoid fighting in the winter. Following Badr's death, most of his domain was conquered by the Annazids, while the Buyid ruler Shams al-Dawla (r. 997–1021) took the rest. Badr's grandson Zahir ibn Hilal ibn Badr attempted to restore his grandfather's position with the support of the Buyids of Hamadan.

== Sources ==
- Bosworth, C. E. (1975). "Iran under the Buyids". In Frye, Richard N. (ed.). The Cambridge History of Iran. Vol. 4. Cambridge: Cambridge University Press. pp. 250–304. ISBN 0-521-20093-8.
- Bosworth, C.E. (1996). The New Islamic Dynasties: A Chronological and Genealogical Manual. New York City: Columbia University Press. ISBN 0-231-10714-5.
- Bürgel, Ch. Bürgel; Mottahedeh, R. (1988). "ʿAżod-al-dawla, Abū Šojāʿ Fannā Ḵosrow". In Yarshater, Ehsan (ed.). Encyclopædia Iranica. Vol. III/3: Azerbaijan IV–Bačča(-ye) Saqqā. London and New York: Routledge & Kegan Paul. pp. 265–269. ISBN 978-0-71009-115-4.
- Kennedy, Hugh (2004). The Prophet and the Age of the Caliphates: The Islamic Near East from the 6th to the 11th Century (Second ed.). Harlow: Longman. ISBN 978-0-582-40525-7.
- Nagel, Tilman (1990). "Buyids". Encyclopaedia Iranica, Vol. IV, Fasc. 6. pp. 578–586.
- Spuler, Bertold (2014). Iran in the Early Islamic Period: Politics, Culture, Administration and Public Life between the Arab and the Seljuk Conquests, 633-1055. Brill. ISBN 978-90-04-28209-4.
- Tor, D. G. (2017). The ʿAbbasid and Carolingian Empires: Comparative Studies in Civilizational Formation. Brill. ISBN 978-9004349896.
