= Hasanwayhids =

Kurdish dynasty

Hasanwayhid dynasty
- 959–1015
- Capital: Dinavar
- Common languages: Kurdish
- Religion: Shia Islam (Twelver)
- Government: Emirate
- History
  - Established: 959
  - Disestablished: 1015
Preceded by	Succeeded by
Buyid dynasty	Annazids; Great Seljuq Empire

The Hasanwayhids or Hasanuyids (Kurdish: حەسەنووییەکان) were a Kurdish Twelver Shia dynasty which ruled over parts of the region of Jibal in western Iran from around 959 to 1015. The dynasty had collapsed by 1015 and was replaced by the Annazids.

== History ==
The founder of the Hasanwayhids was Hasanwayh bin Husayn also known as Abu al-Fawaris. He belonged to a clan within the Kurdish tribe of Barzikani which he led, and the other Barzikani clans were led by several of his relatives. The deaths of two of his uncles in 960 and 961 and the use of force against a nephew enabled Hasanwayh to gather several fortresses and "himayat" in the middle Jibal region around Qarmisin (Kermanshah). His maternal uncles were Ghanim and Windad, sons of a certain Ahmad, from the Aishanid, or 'Ishania, a Kurdish tribe related to the Hasanwayhids. They ruled territories in Dinavar, Hamadan, and Nahavand. Their leaders usurped the rule from the Abbasid Caliphate for fifty years until their deaths in 960-961. The next generation of Aishanid leaders could not maintain control of their family castles, as Dizam bin Ghanim was defeated by the Buyids, and Abd al-Wanhab bin Windad was taken prisoner by a rival Kurdish group and handed over to Hasanwayh, who obtained the rest of the castles of his relatives as he established the Hasanwayhid dynasty.

The Hasanwayhids, as a Kurdish dynasty, were among several native Iranian dynasties which rose during the period between the Arab and Turkic invasions, known as the Iranian Intermezzo. The contemporary historian Abu Ali Miskawayh identified the Hasanwayhids as Kurds from the Barzikani tribe. The 12th century chronicle Mojmal al-Tawarikh mentioned that the Hasanwayhid state originated from rulers of Jibal and Masabadhan. They were also said to have been Twelver Shia Muslims.

Hasanwayh helped the Buyids against the Samanids and their Iranian allies, earning himself favors from Rukn al-Dawla, allowing him to grow his influence over the local Kurds. This emboldened Hasanwayh to forcefully resist Sahlan bin Musafir, the governor of Hamadan, after trouble over the taxes he owed, and Ibn al-'Amid, a wazir of Rukn al-Dawla, organized an expedition against Hasanwayh but it was interrupted by his death. His son and successor Abu al-Fath Ibn al-'Amid negotiated with Hasanwayh, and granted him autonomy in December 970 in exchange for tribute of 50,000 dinars and considerable numbers of animals, and the right to collect taxes in his province.

Hasanwayh reconciled with Sahlan, who was also semi-independent, and established marital alliances. In the Buyid infighting between Izz al-Din Bakhtiyar and his cousin Adud al-Dawla, Hasanwayh contrived Fakhr al-Dawla to confine this to sending him his sons Abd al-Razzaq and Badr and postponing his own arrival until Bakhtiyar was beaten and executed, despite Hasanwayh having promised aid to Bakhtiyar in view of his connexion with the Buyids of the Jibal. There were several unpublished letters written by Abu Ishaq al-Sabi on behalf of Bakhtiyar or the caliph Al-Tai which mentioned the negotiations. Either way, Hasanwayh was not punished by Adud al-Dawla, and he died in 979 in his fortress of Sarmaj to the south of Bisotun.

There was dissension among the sons of Hasanwayh. During the power struggle in which Fakhr al-Dawla set himself up against his brothers Adud al-Dawla and Mu'ayyad al-Dawla of Rayy, several Hasanwayhids including Abd al-Razzaq supported Fakhr al-Dawla, while others including Badr supported Adud al-Dawla. When Fakhr al-Dawla was defeated, his Kurdish supporters were punished, and Sarmaj was taken from Bakhtiyar, while all sons of Hasanwayh were executed except Badr, also known as Abu al-Najm, who was given the title of "hajib" and appointed as leader of the Barzikani Kurds under Mu'ayyad al-Dawla. The events were mentioned in a letter of Abd al-Aziz bin Yusuf.

Badr bin Hasanwayh, also known as Abu al-Najm and later Nasir al-Dawla, was considered a praiseworthy ruler. He was a vassal of Mu'ayyad al-Dawla and assisted him in fighting the Ziyarid Qabus, but was equally loyal to Fakhr al-Dawla when he succeeded Mu'ayyad al-Dawla after he and Adud al-Dawla died. In the claim of succession of Adud al-Dawla, Abu al-Najm supported Fakhr al-Dawla against Sharaf al-Dawla, suppressed a revolt by a Barzikani Kurdish leader near Qom, and when Fakhr al-Dawla died, he appeared as a counsellor to the government of the young beir and his mother, and he assisted them against Mahmud of Ghazna. He also came to good terms with Baha' al-Dawla, whose efforts earned Badr the title of Nasir al-Dawla in 998 from the caliph. Hamdallah Mustawfi referred to Badr as "amir of Kurdistan".

By that point, the Hasanwayhids possessed the territories of Dinavar, Nahavand, Asadabad, Shapurkhast (Khorramabad), Borujerd, and several districts of Ahwaz, as well as Qarmisin (Kermanshah), Hulwan, and Shahrizor from time to time. Abu Shuja Rudhrawari regarded the Barzikani as "the worst tribe on earth for brigandage", but praised Badr for his skill, energy and justice, which allowed him to impose on them a respect for order, to conduct financial administration, to develop the mountain roads and the markets, to foster religion, and to secure the safety of the pilgrimage which crossed his territory by large gifts. Several surviving coins showed that he struck his own coinage.

Nevertheless, the last period of the Hasanwayhids came with several difficulties. In the Buyid infighting, the assistance which the Hasanwayhids gave to some would often involve them in the anger of others. The Hasanwayhids had immemorially been in a rivalry with the Shadhanjan Kurds to the west near Qarmisin and Hulwan, and especially with the most influential family among them, that being the Annazids. Badr had expelled Abu al-Fath ibn Annaz, the Annazid leader, from his territory, and he took refuge among some Banu Uqayl in Upper Mesopotamia, and there were hostilities from this quarter in 1006-7. Again, Badr alienated his eldest son, Hilal, and preferred a younger one. Although Hilal was almost victorious with the assistance given by the vassal ruler of Shahrizor, Hilal was finally defeated by an army sent by Baha' al-Dawla, although Abu al-Fath ibn Annaz, with whom Badr was forced to reconcile, had improved his position through these events. The Barzikani, the tribe of the Hasanwayhids, often clashed with the Shadhanjan, the tribe of the Annazids.

In 1013, Baha al-Dawla died and Tahir (Zahir), a son of Hilal, took Shahrizor, and Hilal, being free, came to take the place. However, after a few months, Abu al-Fath ibn Annaz recaptured it and executed them, and the Annazid rule in the Jibal replaced that of the Hasanwayhids. Generally, the Kurdish subjects and neighbors of Badr had lost respect for him, and he was killed in 1014 while fighting a minor group. The impending danger of a strong Kurdish state emerging was prevented by the collapse of the Hasanwayhids. The Hasanwayhid family, which was stripped of all possessions, retained its old stronghold of Sarmaj, where the last heir died in 1047 around the same time Ibrahim Yinal entered the region.

== See also ==
- List of Kurdish dynasties and countries
- Emirate of Bradost
