= Ibn Lankak =

10th-century poet from Basra

Abu ʾl-Ḥasan Muḥammad ibn Muḥammad ibn Jaʿfar al-Baṣrī ibn Lankak (Arabic: ابن لنكك, d. c. 360 AH/970 CE) was a poet from Basra. His epithet ibn Lankak literally means "the son of the little lame man". He is known to have spent time in Baghdad: when al-Mutanabbī visited the city in 351/962, Ibn Lankak addressed a number of epigrams to him. A dīwān of ibn Lankak's poetry is known to have existed, being mentioned by al-Ṣāḥib Ibn ʿAbbād, but today few poems are known, principally from Abū Manṣūr al-Thaʿālibī's Kitāb Yatīmat al-dahr fī mahāsin ahl al-ʿaṣr. In the estimation of Charles Pellat, Ibn Lankak's surviving works "show him to have had a tendency to be pessimistic and critical: he complains of contemporary poets who deprive him of the glory which he considered his right, of his native town, and above all of fate in general, although he admits in a famous verse that human beings are responsible for their own misfortunes".
