= Ali ibn Kama =

Ali ibn Kama, the nephew of the Buyid ruler Rukn al-Dawla and the latter's other brothers Mu'izz al-Dawla and Imad al-Dawla, was a Buyid military officer who became prominent among the Buyids of Jibal, and was greatly honored among his Daylamite kinsmen. At the death of Imad al-Dawla in 949, Ali was appointed as the viceroy of Ray by Rukn al-Dawla, who went to Shiraz to secure the succession of his son there, Adud al-Dawla. Meanwhile, the Samanids used this opportunity to invade the territories of Rukn al-Dawla, forcing Ali to flee from Jibal. About 959, a battle ensured between Ali and the Ziyarid prince Bisutun, which resulted in a Buyid victory. In 966, Ali and Rukn al-Dawla defeated a large force of ghazis who had arrived from Khorasan. Rukn al-Dawla later died in 976 and was succeeded by his son Fakhr al-Dawla, who had Ali executed.

== Sources ==
- Kennedy, Hugh N. (2004). The Prophet and the Age of the Caliphates: The Islamic Near East from the 6th to the 11th Century (Second ed.). Harlow, UK: Pearson Education Ltd. ISBN 0-582-40525-4.
- Amedroz, Henry F.; Margoliouth, David S., eds. (1921). The Eclipse of the 'Abbasid Caliphate. Original Chronicles of the Fourth Islamic Century, Vol. V: The concluding portion of The Experiences of Nations by Miskawaihi, Vol. II: Reigns of Muttaqi, Mustakfi, Muti and Ta'i. Oxford: Basil Blackwell.
