= Adurbad-i Mahraspand =

Iranian philosopher

- Ādurbād-ī Mahraspand
- Born: Makran or Pars
- Relatives: Mahraspand (father)
- Military career
- Rank: High priest (mowbedan mowbed) of Sasanian Iran

Adurbad-i Mahraspand (Note: Also spelled Adurbad-i Mahrspandan.) ("Ādurbād, son of Mahraspand") was an influential Zoroastrian high priest (mowbedan mowbed) during the reign of the Sasanian king (shah) Shapur II (r. 309–379).

== Biography ==
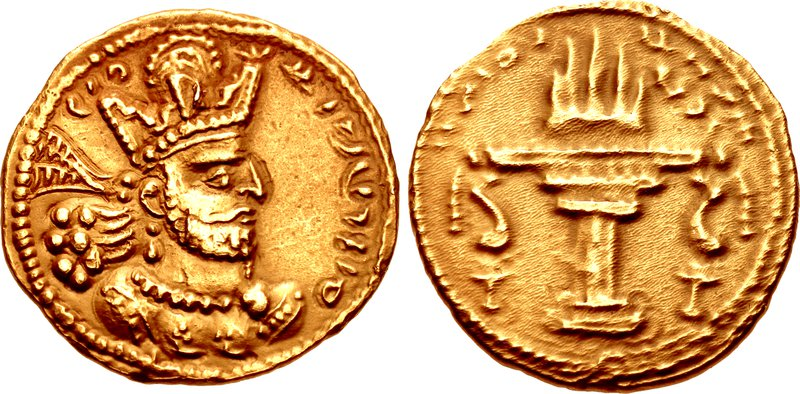
Coin of Shapur II.

Both the Middle Persian Bundahishn and The Remaining Signs of Past Centuries by the medieval scholar al-Biruni consider Adurbad to have been descended from the figure Dursarw, a son of the legendary Pishdadian king Manuchehr. According to the Middle Persian Denkard, Adurbad was from the "village Kuran", possibly a distortion of "a village of Makran", a province in southeastern Iran. The place may also refer to a place in Pars.

In order to demonstrate the legitimacy of his religious heritage, metal was reportedly poured on Adurbad's chest, which did not harm him. According to Iranica, "In keeping with his religious zeal, Ādurbād was a force in the enactment and implementing of decrees against non-Zoroastrians; the established church is described as having then fallen on evil days, plagued by doubt and infidelity.".

Adurbad is credited with the authorship of several andazar (Zoroastrian advices) texts. The Denkard ascribes admonitions to Adurbad; and an Arabic version of these admonitions occur in the work of Miskawayh's al-Hikmat al-khalida. Two groups of his counsels occur in extant Middle Persian text. The first group of counsels contain his addresses to his and is in part translated by Miskawayh in Arabic. The second group comprises his supposed deathbed utterances. A collection of questions is addressed to him by a disciple and his responses are found in the Pahlavi Rivayat. A translation of some of the Middle Persian counsels exist in the book: R. C. Zaehner, The Teachings of the Magi, London, 1956.

== Sources ==
- Boyce, Mary (1984). Zoroastrians: Their Religious Beliefs and Practices. Psychology Press. pp. 1–252. ISBN 9780415239028.
- Daryaee, Touraj (2018). "Shapur II". In Nicholson, Oliver (ed.). The Oxford Dictionary of Late Antiquity. Oxford: Oxford University Press. ISBN 978-0-19-866277-8.
- Tafazzoli, A. (1983). "Ādurbād ī Mahrspandān". Encyclopaedia Iranica, Vol. I, Fasc. 5. p. 477.
- Zeini, Arash Zeini (2018). "Adurbad-i Mahraspand". In Nicholson, Oliver (ed.). The Oxford Dictionary of Late Antiquity. Oxford: Oxford University Press. ISBN 978-0-19-866277-8.
