= Miskawayh =

Persian philosopher and historian ( 932–1030)

Ibn Miskawayh مُسکویه
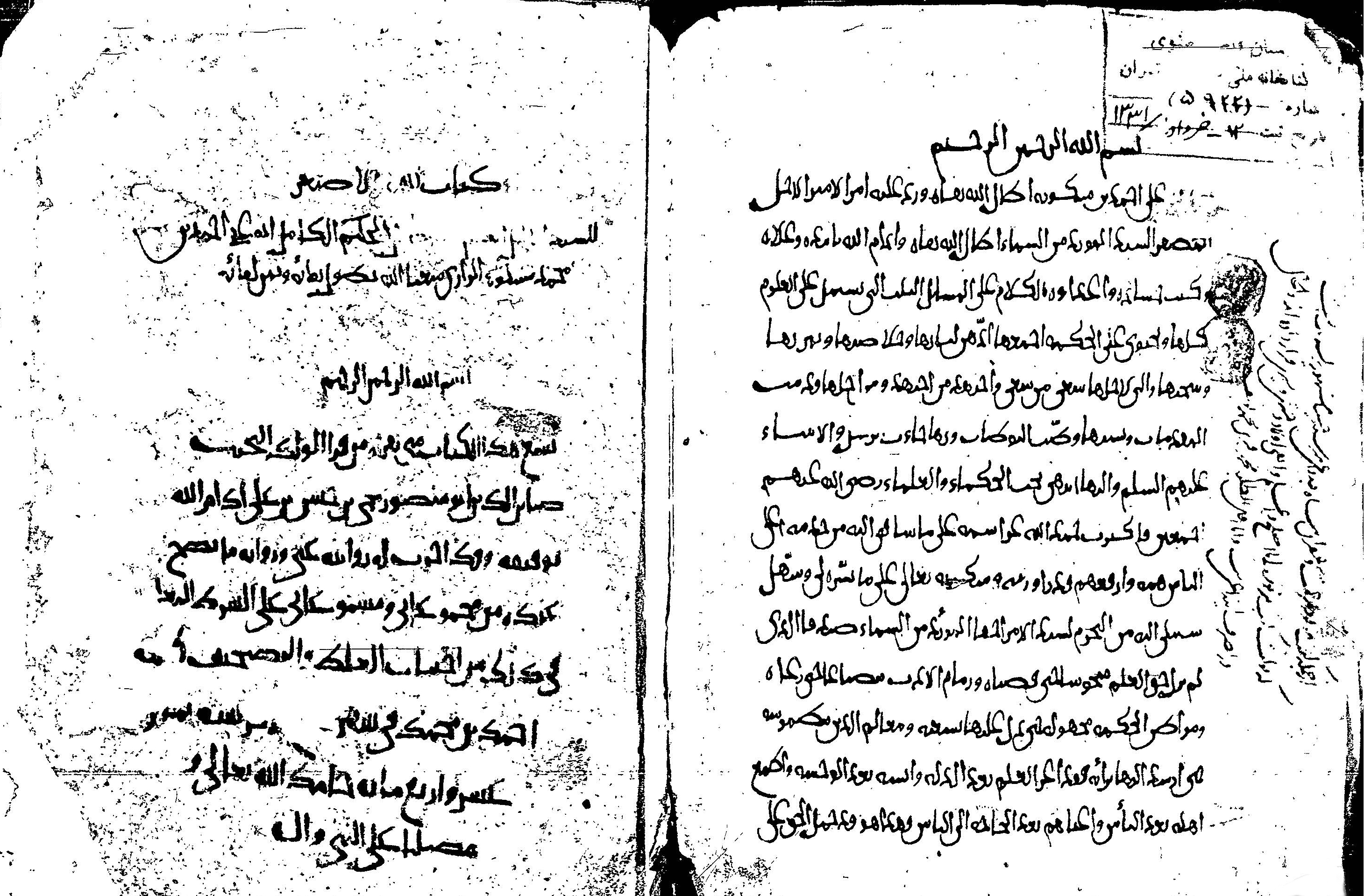
- Beginning of a 14th-century manuscript of Miskawayh's al-Fawz al-Asghar

Personal life
- Born: 932 Parandak, (Ziyarid Iran)
- Died: 1030 Ray, (Kakuyid Iran)
- Era: Islamic Golden Age
- Region: Iran
- Main interest(s): History, Theology, medicine, ethics and philosophy
- Notable work(s): Kitab al hayawan (The book of animal life) تهذيب الأخلاق (Ethical Instruction); Al-Fawz al-Asghar; Tajarib al-umam (Experiences of Nations)

Religious life
- Religion: Islam

Muslim leader
- Influenced by: Adurbad-e Mahrspandan, al-Kindi
- Influenced: Nasir al-Din Tusi, Mulla Sadra

Ibn Miskuyah (Persian: مُسْکُـوْيَه Muskūyah, 932–1030), (Arabic: مِسْكَوَيْه، أبو علي محمد بن أحمد بن يعقوب مسكويه الرازي) full name Abū ʿAlī Aḥmad ibn Muḥammad ibn Yaʿqūb Miskawayh al-Rāzī was a Persian chancery official of the Buyid era, and philosopher and historian from Parandak, Iran. As a Neoplatonist, his influence on Islamic philosophy is primarily in the area of ethics. He was the author of the first major Islamic work on philosophical ethics entitled the Refinement of Character (تهذيب الأخلاق Tahdhīb al-Akhlāq), focusing on practical ethics, conduct, and the refinement of character. He separated personal ethics from the public realm, and contrasted the liberating nature of reason with the deception and temptation of nature. Miskawayh was a prominent figure in the intellectual and cultural life of his time.

== Life ==
Miskawayh was born in Rey, then under Ziyarid control. Miskawayh may have been a Zoroastrian convert to Islam, but it seems more likely that it was one of his ancestors who converted. During his early career, he spent his life in Baghdad, where he served as the secretary of Muhallabi, the vizier of the Buyid emir Mu'izz al-Dawla. He was fluent enough in Middle Persian to have translated some pre-Islamic texts in that language into Arabic. After a long service to the Buyids of Iraq, Miskawayh moved to the court of Rukn al-Dawla, where he spent seven years working there with the Buyid vizier Abu 'l-Fadl ibn al-'Amid. In 966, a group of ghazi marched towards the Library of Rey, but Miskawayh managed to save it. After the death of Abu'l-Fadl ibn al-'Amid in 970, Miskawayh continued to serve the latter's son, Abu'l-Fath. In 975, he, along with him, left for Baghdad.

He later worked as a secretary and librarian for a sequence of viziers, including 'Adud al-Dawla. Some contemporary sources associated him with the Brethren of Purity, claiming that some of his writings were used in the compilation of the Encyclopedia of the Brethren of Purity. Miskawayh died in 1030 at Ray, then under Kakuyid control.

== Works ==
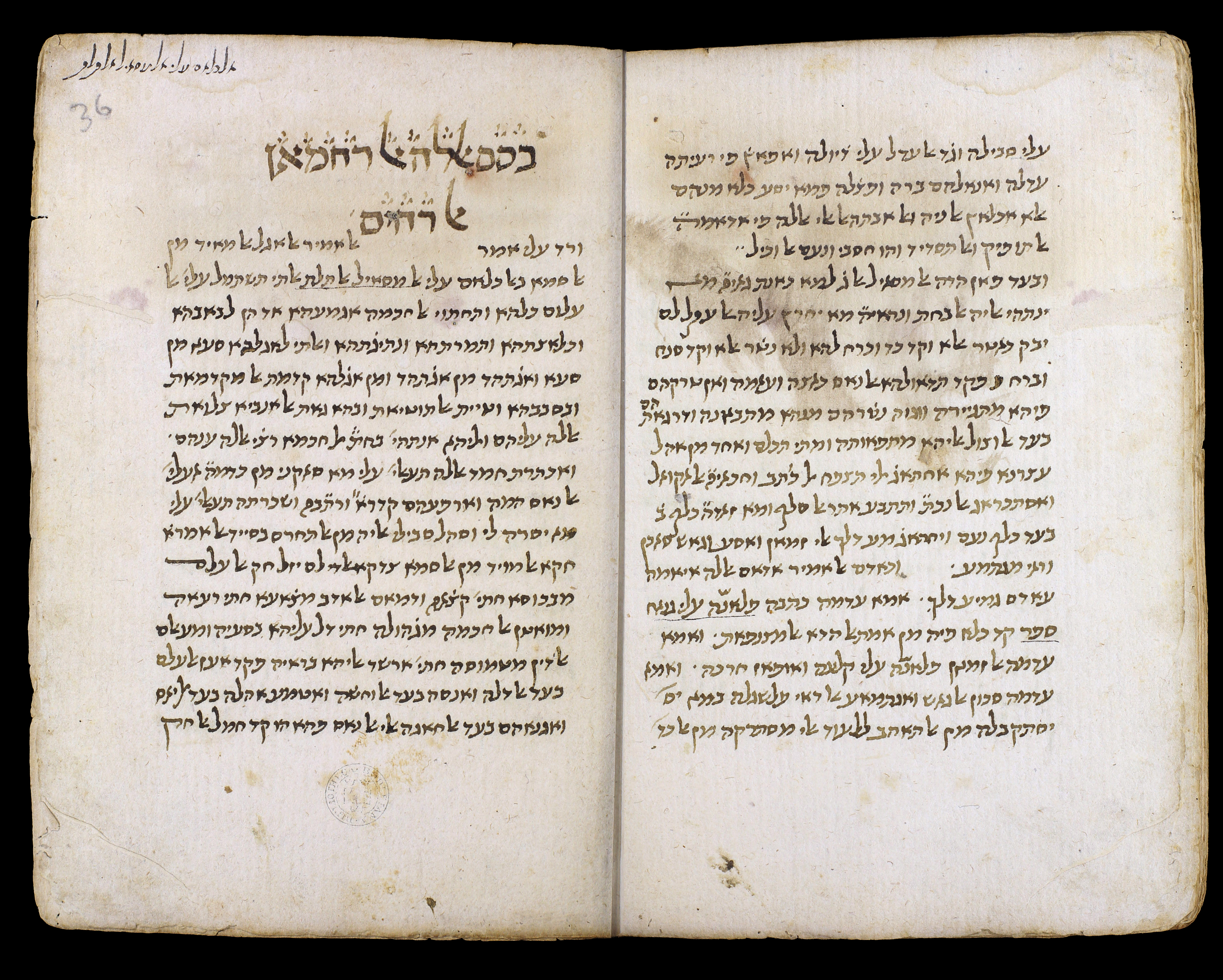
- Beginning of a 13th-century Judeo-Arabic version of al-Fawz al-Asghar
  Al-Fawz al-Akbar (الفوز الأكبر) - 'The Greatest Victory' contains a Neoplatonic description of the evolution of the soul. The work states that creation begins with God, with the intellect being the first existence to emanate from him. A series of emanations from the intellect results in a chain of being, starting with minerals and proceeding through vegetables, animals, and humans, which results in a cyclic spiritual evolution back to the source of man's creation: God. The Indian Islamic scholar Muhammad Hamidullah compared Miskawayh's views to Darwinian evolutionary thought.
- Tajārib al-Umam (كتاب تجارب الأمم) - 'Experiences of Nations' is one of the first eyewitness chronicles of contemporary events by a Muslim historian. Miskawayh, as an official under the Buyid vizier al-Muhallabi, had access to the internal happenings of the court. The chronicle is a universal history from the beginning of Islam, but it cuts off near the end of the reign of 'Adud al-Dawla.
- Tahdhib al'Akhlaq wa Tathir al'Araq (تهذيب الأخلاق و تطهير الأعراق) - 'Refinement of Morals and Cleansing of Ethics' his major work in the field of philosophy treats principally the philosophy of ethics and was written for students.
- Kitab al-Hikma al-Khalida (كتاب الحكمة الخالدة) - 'Book of Eternal Wisdom' is an Arabic translation from the Persian work Eternal Wisdom (Persian: جاویدان خرد). One manuscript is titled Book of Literatures of the Arabs and Persians (كتاب آداب العرب والفرس).

== See also ==
- List of Muslim historians
- List of Shia Muslims

== Sources ==
- Bosworth, C. E. (2002). "Meskawayh, Abu' Ali Aḥmad". Encyclopædia Iranica, online edition. New York.
- Emami, Abu'l-Qassem; Umar, Suheyl (2008). "Abū ʿAlī Miskawayh". In Madelung, Wilferd; Daftary, Farhad (eds.). Encyclopaedia Islamica Online. Brill Online. ISSN 1875-9831.
- Ibn Miskawayh, Aḥmad ibn Muḥammad (1329). Kitāb Tahdhīb al-akhlāq wa-taṭhīr al-aʻrāq (in Arabic). Cairo: al-Maṭbaʻah al-Ḥusaynīyah.
- Ibn Miskawaih, Ahmad ibn Muhammad (1917) [1909]. Caetani, Leone (ed.). The Tajârib al-umam; or, History of Ibn Miskawayh (in Arabic). Vol. 5&6. London: Luzac.
