= Mu'ayyad al-Dawla =

10th century Buyid Amir of Hamadan, Jibal, Tabaristan and Gorgan

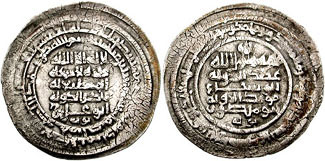
- Coin of Mu'ayyad al-Dawla

Amir of Gorgan
- Reign: 981–983
- Predecessor: Post Created
- Successor: Fakhr al-Dawla

Amir of Tabaristan
- Reign: 980–983
- Predecessor: Post Created
- Successor: Fakhr al-Dawla

Amir of Rey (Jibal)
- Reign: 977–983
- Predecessor: Fakhr al-Dawla
- Successor: Fakhr al-Dawla

Amir of Hamadan
- Reign: 976–983
- Predecessor: Rukn al-Dawla
- Successor: Fakhr al-Dawla
- Born: 7 March 942
- Died: 983
Names
- Laqab: Mu'ayyad al-Dawla; Kunya: Abu Mansur; Given name: Buya
- Father: Rukn al-Dawla
- Religion: Shia Islam

Abu Mansur Buya (Persian: ابو منصور بویه; died 983), better known by his honorific title of Mu'ayyad al-Dawla (Arabic: مویدالدوله, lit. 'Helper of the State') was the Buyid amir of Hamadan (976–983), Jibal (977–983), Tabaristan (980–983), and Gorgan (981–983). He was the third son of Rukn al-Dawla.

== Biography ==
Abu Mansur Buya was the son of Rukn al-Dawla and a daughter of the Daylamite Firuzanid nobleman Al-Hasan ibn al-Fairuzan, who was the cousin of the famous military leader Makan ibn Kaki. Abu Mansur Buya lived in Isfahan during his youth. In 955, a Daylamite military officer named Muhammad ibn Makan, attacked Isfahan. Abu Mansur Buya, along with family and followers, were then forced to leave the city.

The eldest son of Rukn al-Dawla, 'Adud al-Dawla, along with Rukn al-Dawla's vizier Abu 'l-Fadl ibn al-'Amid, then marched towards Isfahan and defeated Muhammad ibn Makan. After Isfahan was in safe Buyid hands once again, Abu Mansur Buya, along with his family and followers, then returned to the city. In ca. 958, Abu Mansur Buya went to Baghdad, and married Mu'izz al-Dawla's daughter Zubayda. After the marriage, he returned with her to Isfahan. Later in 966, Abu Mansur Buya was given the honorific title of "Mu'ayyad al-Dawla"

As part of the settlement between Rukn al-Dawla and his eldest son 'Adud al-Dawla in early 976, Mu'ayyad al-Dawla was to receive Hamadan upon his father's death, in exchange for recognizing 'Adud al-Dawla as senior amir. Only a year later, Rukn al-Dawla's second son Fakhr al-Dawla, who ruled in Ray, rebelled against 'Adud al-Dawla's authority. Mu'ayyad al-Dawla mobilized in support of 'Adud al-Dawla, forcing Fakhr al-Dawla to flee to the Ziyarids of Gorgan and Tabaristan. This did not stop the two Buyids; 'Adud al-Dawla took Gorgan in 980, while Mu'ayyad al-Dawla gained control of Tabaristan in 981. Mu'ayyad al-Dawla was entrusted with the newly captured provinces as 'Adud al-Dawla's subordinate.

'Adud al-Dawla died in March 983, and Mu'ayyad al-Dawla followed him shortly afterwards. His vizier, Sahib ibn 'Abbad, summoned a gathering of the army and convinced its leaders to proclaim Fakhr al-Dawla as his successor.

Preceded by Rukn al-Dawla	Buyid Amir (in Hamadan); 976–983	Succeeded by Fakhr al-Dawla
Preceded by Fakhr al-Dawla	Buyid Amir (in Ray); 977–983	Succeeded by Fakhr al-Dawla
New title	Buyid Amir (in Gorgan); 980–983	Succeeded by Fakhr al-Dawla
New title	Buyid Amir (in Tabaristan); 981–983	Succeeded by Fakhr al-Dawla
