= Sahib ibn Abbad =

Persian scholar, statesman and grand vizier of the Buyid dynasty (938-995)

Grand Vizier of the Buyid emirate of Ray
- In office 976–995
- Monarchs: Mu'ayyad al-Dawla; Fakhr al-Dawla
- Preceded by: Abu'l-Fath Ali ibn Muhammad
- Succeeded by: Unknown

Personal life
- Born: 14 September 938 Talaqancha, near Isfahan
- Died: 30 March 995 Ray, Jibal
- Parent: Abu'l-Hasan Abbad ibn Abbas (father)

Religious life
- Religion: Islam
- Denomination: Mu'tazila

Abu’l-Qāsim Ismāʿīl ibn ʿAbbād ibn al-ʿAbbās (Persian: ابوالقاسم اسماعیل بن عباد بن عباس; born 938 - died 30 March 995), better known as Ṣāḥib ibn ʿAbbād (صاحب بن عباد), also known as al-Ṣāḥib (الصاحب), was a Persian scholar and statesman, who served as the grand vizier of the Buyid rulers of Ray from 976 to 995.

A native of the suburbs of Isfahan, he was greatly interested in Arab culture, and wrote on dogmatic theology, history, grammar, lexicography, scholarly criticism and wrote poetry and belles-lettres.

== Life ==
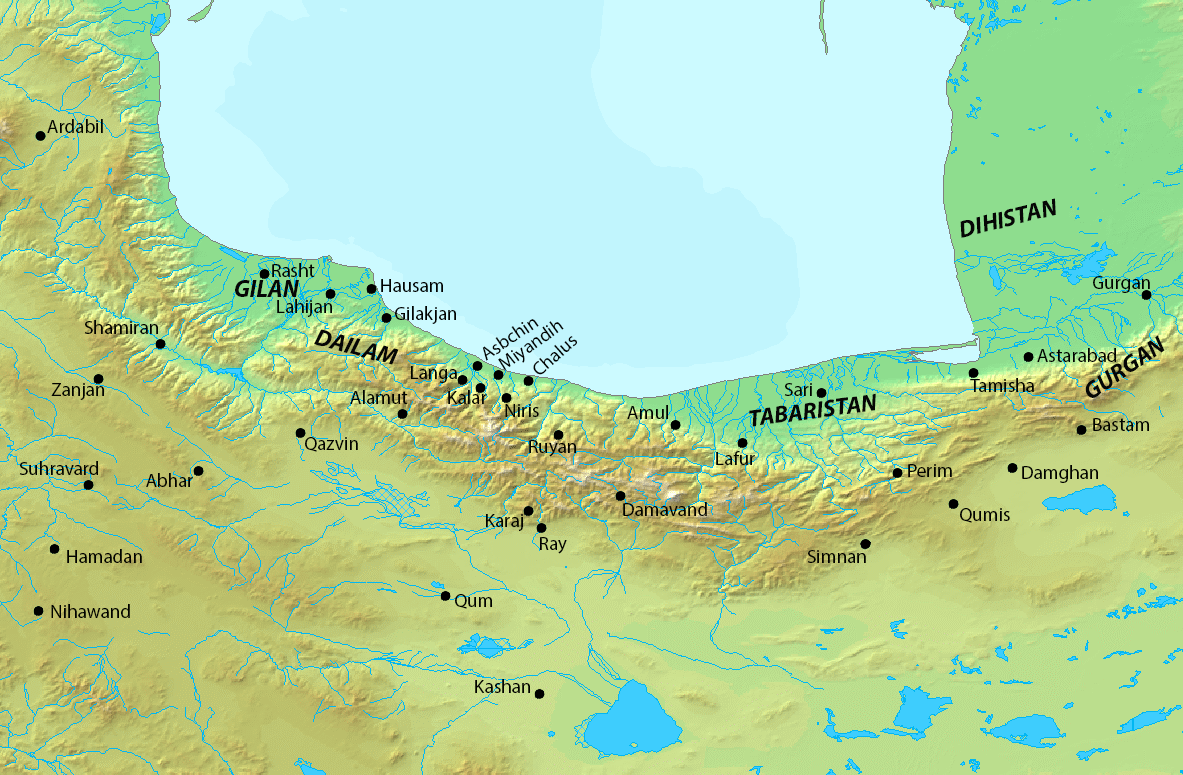
Map of northern Iran

Sahib was born on 14 September 938 in Talaqancha, a village roughly 20 miles south of the major Buyid city of Isfahan. His father was Abu'l-Hasan Abbad ibn Abbas (d. 946), a renowned and well-educated administrator, who composed works on the Mu'tazili doctrine. Sahib spent his childhood at Talakan, a town in Daylam near Qazvin. He later settled in Isfahan, and served for some time as an official of the Buyid ruler of Jibal, Rukn al-Dawla (r. 935–976). After the death of his father, Sahib became the pupil of the scholar and philosopher, Ibn 'al-Amid, who had recently replaced Sahib's deceased father as the vizier of Rukn al-Dawla.

The story is told that to keep company with his collection of 117,000 books while travelling, Sahib had them "borne by a caravan of four hundred camels trained to walk in alphabetical order". His large section on theology (kalam) was burned by the staunch Sunni Mahmud of Ghazni who opposed the Mu'tazili.

== Sources ==
- Donohue, John J. (2003). The Buwayhid Dynasty in Iraq 334 H./945 to 403 H./1012: Shaping Institutions for the Future. Leiden and Boston: Brill. ISBN 90-04-12860-3.
- Kabir, Mafizullah (1964). The Buwayhid Dynasty of Baghdad, 334/946-447/1055.
- Yusofi, G. H. (1984). "Aḥmad Maymandī". AḤMAD MAYMANDĪ – Encyclopaedia Iranica. Encyclopaedia Iranica, Vol. I, Fasc. 6. pp. 650–652.
- Pomerantz, Maurice. "Ebn ʿAbbād, Esmāʿil, al-Ṣāḥeb Kāfi al-Kofāt". ṢĀḤEB EBN ʿABBĀD, ESMĀʿIL – Encyclopaedia Iranica. Encyclopaedia Iranica.
- Pellat, Ch. & Cahen, Cl. (2012). "Ibn ʿAbbād". The Encyclopaedia of Islam, Second Edition (12 vols.). Leiden: E. J. Brill. doi:10.1163/1573-3912_islam_SIM_3024.
- Pomerantz, M.A. (2021). Adab and governance in two letters of al-Ṣāḥib b. ʿAbbād. History Compass, e12684. https://doi.org/10.1111/hic3.12684

Preceded by Abu'l-Fath Ali ibn Muhammad	Grand Vizier of the Buyid amirate of Ray; 976 – 995	Unknown
