= Imad al-Dawla =

Founder of Buyid dynasty in Iran (c.891/2–949)

Imad al-Dawla عمادالدوله
- Amir; Shahanshah
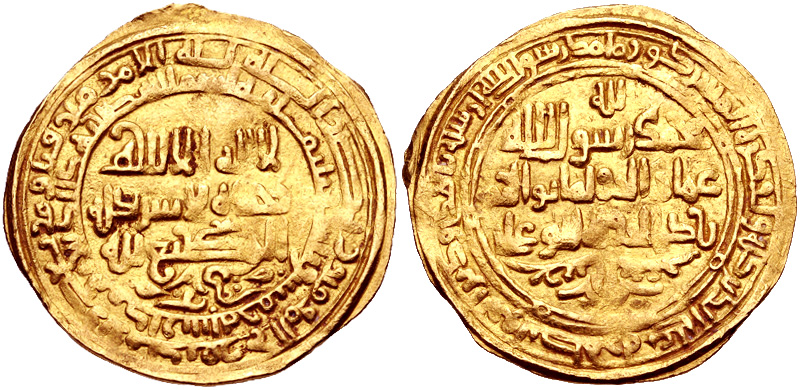
- Gold dinar of Imad al-Dawla, minted at Hamadan in 946/47

Amir of the Buyid amirate of Fars
- Reign: 934–949
- Successor: Adud al-Dawla
- Born: 891/92; Daylam
- Died: December 949; Shiraz, Buyid dynasty
- Burial: Istakhr
- Dynasty: Buyid
- Father: Abu Shuja Buya
- Religion: Zaydi Shia Islam (until 941); Twelver Shia Islam (from 941)

Ali ibn Buya (Persian: علی بن بویه, Arabic: علي بن بویه), commonly known by his laqab (honorific epithet) Imad al-Dawla (عمادالدوله; c. 891/2 – December 949), was the founder of the Buyid amirate of Fars, ruling as its amir (ruler) from 934 to 949. Together with his two younger brothers, Rukn al-Dawla and Mu'izz al-Dawla, he established a triumvirate, centered on Ray, Shiraz and Baghdad.

== Early career ==
Ali was the eldest son of Abu Shuja Buya, a fisherman of modest origin from Daylam, a region in northern Iran. Abu Shuja Buya was most likely a recent convert to Islam, which explains the Arabic names of his sons, typical of the children of a convert.

Ali first entered the services of the Samanids under Nasr II, where he became a member of the ruler's entourage. From there he eventually joined Makan ibn Kaki, who ruled Gorgan and Ray as a governor of the Samanids, in around 928. He may have done so at Nasr's suggestion; in any case, he managed to occupy a high position under Makan and gained army commissions for his two younger brothers, Hasan and Ahmad. In 930, however, Makan rebelled against the Samanids by seizing Khurasan; he was subsequently attacked by the Ziyarid prince Mardavij and forced to give up Tabaristan.

Ali and his brothers managed to defect to Mardavij's side just as the Ziyarid was preparing to undertake the conquest to the south of the Alborz mountains as far as Qazvin. Not long afterwards Mardavij granted Ali administrative rule over Karaj, a strategically important town probably situated near modern Bahramabad. While making a stop in Ray on his way to Karaj, however, Ali was warned by Mardavij's vizier al-'Amid that the Ziyarid was planning to eliminate him. Hurriedly leaving Ray, he arrived at and took over Karaj.

With a small number of Daylamite troops to support him, Ali sought to expand his position. Moving against the heretical Khurramites, who controlled the surrounding mountains, he gained control of the region and was heavily enriched by the expeditions. At the same time, he managed to maintain his troops' loyalty, despite Mardavij's attempts to incite them against their master.

== Foundation of the Buyid state ==
In order to further secure his position, Ali decided to seize the nearby city of Isfahan, then under control of the Abbasid governor Yaqut. The enemy army outnumbered Ali's, but a large portion of it defected to him upon his appearance before the city. Yaqut, however, refused to negotiate with him, and Mardavij's approach forced him to abandon Isfahan in favor of the Ziyarids. Having fled Karaj as well, Ali now took Arrajan, a city between Fars and Khuzistan. Having stayed for the winter in Arrajan, Ali decided to campaign in Fars in the spring of 933. There he encountered the resistance of Yaqut, who was also the governor of Fars and from whom Ali had stripped Arrajan. He also found an ally, Zayd ibn Ali al-Naubandagani, a wealthy landowner who disliked the Abbasids. After a series of battles, Ali managed to prove the victor. By May or June 934, he entered Shiraz, the capital of Fars.

In order to prevent Mardavij from pressing claims on his territory, Ali sought the recognition of the Abbasid Caliph, who confirmed him as his viceroy in September or October 934. Although the caliph's emissary arrived with the insignia for his office, however, Ali delayed giving the requisite tribute; by the time the emissary died in Shiraz two years later, the tribute was still unpaid. Mardavij continued to pose a threat; he decided to invade Khuzistan, which was still under caliphal control, in order to sever the Buyids from the Caliphate. This invasion prompted the caliph to reach an agreement with the Ziyarid, which forced Ali to recognize Mardavij's authority. This recognition proved short-lived, as Mardavij was assassinated in January of 935. Ali then decided to press claims on Khuzistan, and occupied 'Askar Mukram. The Buyid and the caliph then came to terms with one another; the latter confirmed Ali in his possession of Fars and gave Khuzistan to Yaqut.

== The Buyid empire takes shape ==
Bolstered by many of Mardavij's Turkish mercenaries that had joined him, as well as the collapse of Ziyarid control over central Iran, Ali decided that Isfahan should be taken. He sent his brother Hasan to accomplish this. Hasan initially managed to take Isfahan but later encountered difficulties (for details about his campaigns in central Iran, see Rukn al-Dawla). After Hasan took Isfahan, Ali sent his other brother Ahmad (see Mu'izz al-Dawla) to take Kirman. Although the bulk of that province was compelled to recognize Buyid authority, direct control was not established, and Ali eventually recalled him.

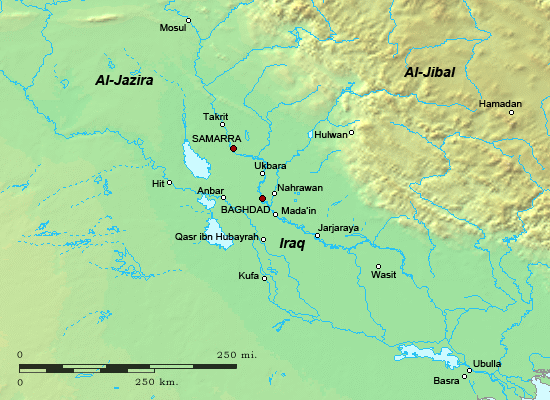
Map of Iraq in the 9th-century

Ali next sent Ahmad to Khuzistan, where the Basrian clan of the Baridis had become the de facto rulers of the province but were trying to throw off caliphal rule. They asked Ali for their struggle against the Abbasids, providing the pretext for Ahmad to enter Khuzistan. Although the Baridis temporarily recovered the province and even managed to take Baghdad a few times, Ahmad eventually took control of Khuzistan himself. From Khuzistan Ahmad waged a series of campaigns in Iraq, until in 945 he entered Baghdad. The caliph then gave him the title of "Mu'izz al-Dawla", while Ali and Hasan were given the titles of "Imad al-Dawla" and "Rukn al-Dawla", respectively. By 948 Rukn al-Dawla had also secured his position in central Iran, causing a clear definition of the borders of the Buyid state.

Imad al-Dawla was not the master of the entire Buyid empire. Rukn al-Dawla, who had carved up his own kingdom in central Iran without military support from Imad al-Dawla, was relatively independent of the latter. Mu'izz al-Dawla, on the other hand, had been given support by his brother in his efforts to take Khuzistan, and was a subordinate of Imad al-Dawla. He was not listed as an independent ruler on contemporary sources, and the name of his brother appeared before his own on coins struck by him. Despite the fact that Mu'izz al-Dawla's capture of Baghdad resulted in him gaining the title of senior amir (amir al-umara), which in theory made him the highest ranking individual out of all three Buyids, he remained little more than a provincial ruler under Imad al-Dawla's authority. Imad al-Dawla himself claimed the title of senior amir during his lifetime, and although he never officially held it, nor was entitled to do so, he was recognized as the de facto holder of that position.

Imad al-Dawla's lack of an heir posed a problem until shortly before his death. A few months beforehand, he settled on Rukn al-Dawla's eldest son Fana-Khusraw as his successor. He died in December 949, and his brothers helped to install Fana-Khusraw (who took the title of "'Adud al-Dawla") in Shiraz. Rukn al-Dawla, who was the most powerful of the Buyids, claimed the title of senior amir for himself and received both Mu'izz al-Dawla's and 'Adud al-Dawla's recognition as such.

Imad al-Dawla was buried in Istakhr.

== Sources ==
- Baker, Christine D. (2016). "The lost origins of the Daylamites: the construction of a new ethnic legacy for the Buyids". In Kennedy, Rebecca Futo; Jones-Lewis, Molly (eds.). The Routledge Handbook of Identity and the Environment in the Classical and Medieval Worlds. Routledge. pp. 281–295. ISBN 978-0415738057.
- Bosworth, C. E. (1975). "Iran under the Buyids". In Frye, Richard N. (ed.). The Cambridge History of Iran: From the Arab Invasion to the Saljuqs. Vol. 4. Cambridge: Cambridge University Press. pp. 250–304. ISBN 0-521-20093-8.
- Curtis, Vesta Sarkhosh; Stewart, Sarah (2009). The Rise of Islam: The Idea of Iran Vol 4. I.B. Tauris. ISBN 978-1845116910.
- Davaran, Fereshteh (2010). Continuity in Iranian Identity: Resilience of a Cultural Heritage. Routledge. ISBN 978-1138780149.
- Herzig, Edmund; Stewart, Sarah (2011). Early Islamic Iran. I. B. Tauris. ISBN 978-1780760612.
- Kennedy, Hugh (2004) [1986]. The Prophet and the Age of the Caliphates: The Islamic Near East from the 6th to the 11th Century (Second ed.). Harlow: Longman. ISBN 978-0-582-40525-7.
- Nagel, Tilman (1990). "Buyids". Encyclopaedia Iranica, Vol. IV, Fasc. 6. pp. 578–586.
- Madelung, Wilferd; Daftary, Farhad; Meri, Josef W. (2003). Culture and Memory in Medieval Islam: Essays in Honor of Wilferd Madelung. I.B. Tauris. ISBN 978-1-86064-859-5.
- Miles, G. C. (1975). "Numismatics". In Frye, Richard N. (ed.). The Cambridge History of Iran: From the Arab Invasion to the Saljuqs. Vol. 4. Cambridge: Cambridge University Press. pp. 364–378. ISBN 0-521-20093-8.
- Sajjadi, Sadeq; Asatryan, Mushegh; Melvin-Koushki, Matthew. "Būyids". In Madelung, Wilferd; Daftary, Farhad (eds.). Encyclopaedia Islamica Online. Brill Online. ISSN 1875-9831.
- Spuler, Bertold (2014). Iran in the Early Islamic Period: Politics, Culture, Administration and Public Life between the Arab and the Seljuk Conquests, 633-1055. Brill. ISBN 978-90-04-28209-4.

Preceded by	Amir of the Buyid amirate of Fars; 934–949	Succeeded by Adud al-Dawla
