= Firuzanids =

Iranian princely family

The Firuzanids (Perozanids; Persian: فیروزانیان) were an Iranian princely family of Daylamite origin which ruled Shukur, and at their greatest extent ruled all of Tabaristan.

== Biography ==
The family was native to Daylam. During their early period, the family held much influence over the districts of Shukur, Ranikuh and Ashkawar in Tabaristan. The first member of the family was a certain Nu'man, who had two sons named Kaki and Fairuzan, whom both served the Alid dynasties of northern Iran. In 902, both of them were killed during a Samanid invasion of Tabaristan. Both of the slain brothers had a son; Kaki had a son named Makan ibn Kaki, while Fairuzan had a son named Al-Hasan ibn al-Fairuzan. Both of these sons would later play an important role in the politics of northern Iran. Makan later managed to make the Alid ruler his puppet, and make Tabaristan part of his domains.

However, other Daylamites such as Asfar ibn Shiruya, including the Daylamite Buyids and Ziyarids, and the Persian Samanid dynasty, claimed suzerainty over Tabaristan, which in the end resulted in Makan getting killed in 940 by a Samanid army. Makan had a son named Ibn Makan, who later tried to seize Isfahan from the Buyids, but was defeated, and thereafter disappears from history chronicles. Al-Hasan managed to survive the struggle, and had two sons named Firuzan ibn al-Hasan and Nasr ibn al-Hasan.

According to the historian Ibn Isfandiyar, Firuzan ruled Daylam, while Nasr ruled Qumis. Nasr is said to have built the Shahdiz in ca. 970, which would later become an important Ismaili fortress. Nasr later fell out of favor from the Ziyarid ruler Qabus, and was imprisoned. The fate of his brother is unknown. Nasr had a son named Hazarasp ibn Nasr, who served as a Buyid military officer. After this, the family disappears from history chronicles.

== Sources ==
- Madelung, W. (1975). "The Minor Dynasties of Northern Iran". In Frye, R.N. (ed.). The Cambridge History of Iran, Volume 4: From the Arab Invasion to the Saljuqs. Cambridge: Cambridge University Press. pp. 198–249. ISBN 978-0-521-20093-6.
- Nazim, M. (1987). "Mākān b. Kākī". In Houtsma, Martijn Theodoor (ed.). E.J. Brill's first encyclopaedia of Islam, 1913–1936, Volume V: L–Moriscos. Leiden: BRILL. pp. 164–165. ISBN 90-04-08265-4.
- Blair, Sheila (1992). The Monumental Inscriptions from Early Islamic Iran and Transoxiana. BRILL. pp. 1–307. ISBN 9789004093676.
