= Rukn al-Dawla =

Buyid Emir of Jibal from 935 to 976

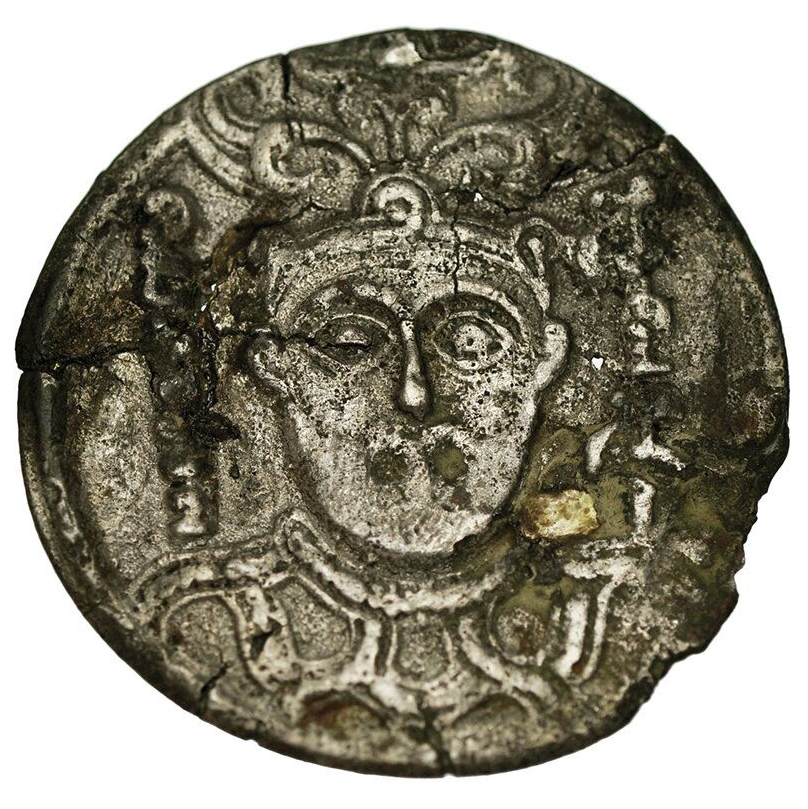
- Bust of Rukn al-Dawla on a dirham dated 962-963

Buyid Emir of Jibal
- Reign: 935 – September 976
- Successor: Fakhr al-Dawla (in Ray); Mu'ayyad al-Dawla (in Hamadan)
- Born: 898; Daylam
- Died: September 976; Ray
- Issue: Fakhr al-Dawla 'Adud al-Dawla; Mu'ayyad al-Dawla
- Father: Buya
- Religion: Shia Islam

Hasan (died September 976), better known by his laqab as Rukn al-Dawla (Persian: رکن‌الدوله دیلمی), was the first Buyid amir of northern and central Iran (c. 935–976). He was the son of Buya.

== Struggle for power ==
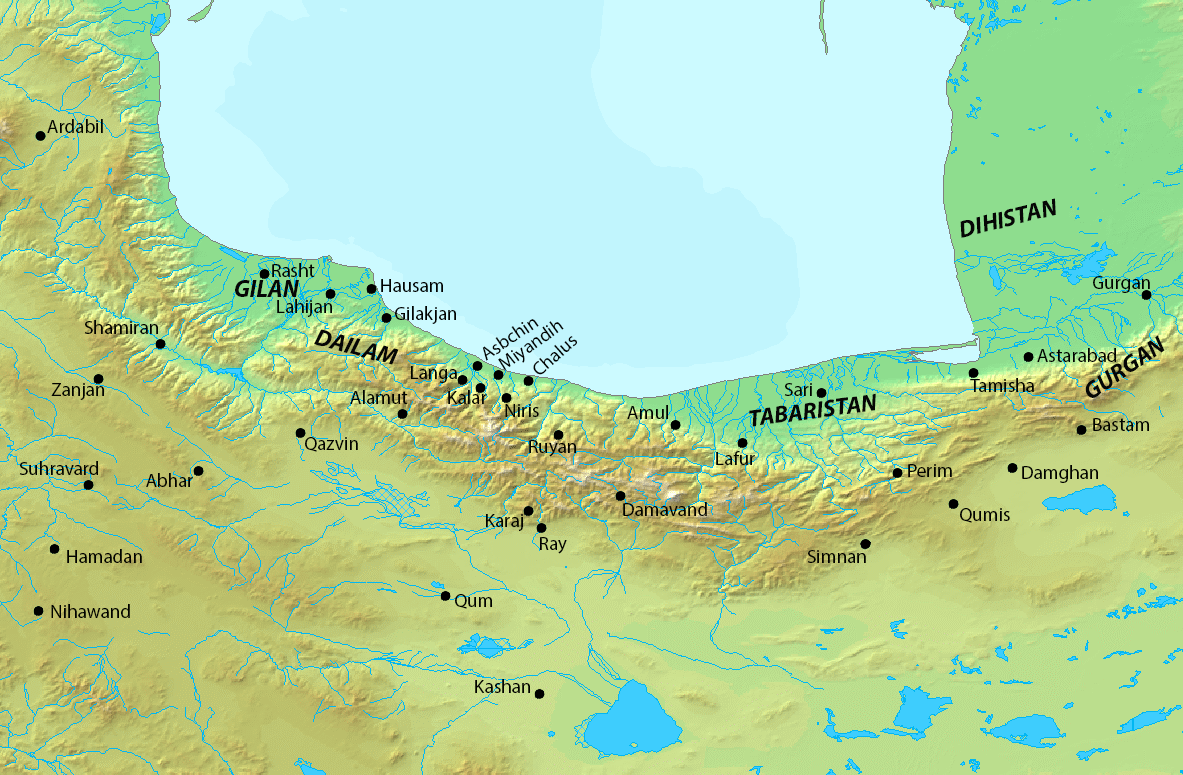
Map of northern Iran

Hasan was the son of Buya, a Dailamite fisherman from Lahijan, who left his Zoroastrian faith and converted to Islam. Hasan had an older brother named 'Ali and a younger brother named Ahmad. He also had a sister named Kama.

In around 928, Hasan's brother 'Ali joined the services of Makan, who was the Samanid governor of Ray. 'Ali then managed to gain military positions for Hasan and their other brother Ahmad. At the time, Hasan was about thirty years old. When Makan attacked his Samanid overlords and was subsequently defeated by the Ziyarid prince Mardavij, the brothers transferred their allegiance to the latter.

In the following years, 'Ali repudiated his subservience to Mardavij and, after some time, managed to create an empire in Fars. During this time, Hasan distinguished himself in the battles over that province. Mardavij, however, marched south and forced 'Ali to recognize his authority in around 934. Hasan was sent to Madavij's court as a hostage. The death of Mardavij in 935 allowed Hasan to escape, and also provided an opportunity for the Buyids to expand into central Iran. 'Ali therefore sent Hasan to take Isfahan. The Ziyarids, now under Vushmgir, were busy dealing with the Samanids, allowing the Buyid to easily take the city. This success did not last, however. Internal disruptions, combined with an invasion by Vushmgir, forced Hasan to abandon Isfahan to the Ziyarids three years later. In 940, he appointed Abu 'l-Fadl ibn al-'Amid as his vizier.

Although he did not receive much support from 'Ali, Hasan continued to be involved in central Iran. In 940 he recaptured Isfahan, then defeated Vushmgir in battle and occupied Ray, which had been taken by the Samanids, in 943. Meanwhile, in 945 Hasan's brother Ahmad had managed to capture Baghdad, occupying the Abbasid Caliphate. The caliph al-Mustakfi gave Ahmad the honorific title of "Mu'izz al-Dawla", while 'Ali received the title of "'Imad al-Dawla". Hasan himself was bestowed with the title "Rukn al-Dawla".

That same year, 945, saw Rukn al-Dawla expelled from all of central Iran by Ibn Muhtaj, the governor of Samanid Khurasan. Only in 946 or 947 was he able to make his return to Ray. He was, however, able to expand his territory after doing so, stripping Vushmgir of Gurgan and Tabaristan. Some time later, Abu Mansur Muhammad, a former Samanid general who had rebelled against them, took refuge in Ray, and was honored by Rukn al-Dawla, who, along with his brothers, greatly awarded him with riches. Rukn al-Dawla shortly sent Abu Mansur to Damghan in order to protect Ray from an Samanid invasion.

In 948 or 949, the Sallarid ruler of Azerbaijan, al-Marzuban, became angry over a diplomatic insult sent to him by Mu'izz al-Dawla. He sought revenge against the Buyids by attempting to seize Ray from Rukn al-Dawla. The amir, however, convinced al-Marzuban by diplomatic measures to delay his expedition until his brothers sent him additional armies; he then sent an army under Abu Mansur which defeated al-Marzuban near Qazvin and imprisoned him.

== Senior ruler of the Buyid state ==
In around 948 'Imad al-Dawla named Rukn al-Dawla's eldest son, Fana Khusrau ('Adud al-Dawla) as his successor. In September 949 he died, and Rukn al-Dawla claimed the title of senior amir for himself. He traveled to Shiraz and stayed there for at least nine months in order to secure his son's succession there, despite the fact that the Samanids were threatening his own possessions. Mu'izz al-Dawla, meanwhile, accepted Rukn al-Dawla's position of senior amir and also sent troops to Shiraz to assist 'Adud al-Dawla.

With his substantial territories in central Iran, as well as pledges to respect his authority by both Mu'izz al-Dawla and 'Adud al-Dawla, Rukn al-Dawla was now the most powerful ruler in the Buyid empire. The center of power therefore shifted from Shiraz to Ray. As a consequence of this, Rukn al-Dawla was able to request troops from the other Buyid rulers. His own position was not secure; during his time in Shiraz the governor of Samanid Khurasan seized Jibal for a time.

=== First invasion of Azerbaijan and aftermath ===
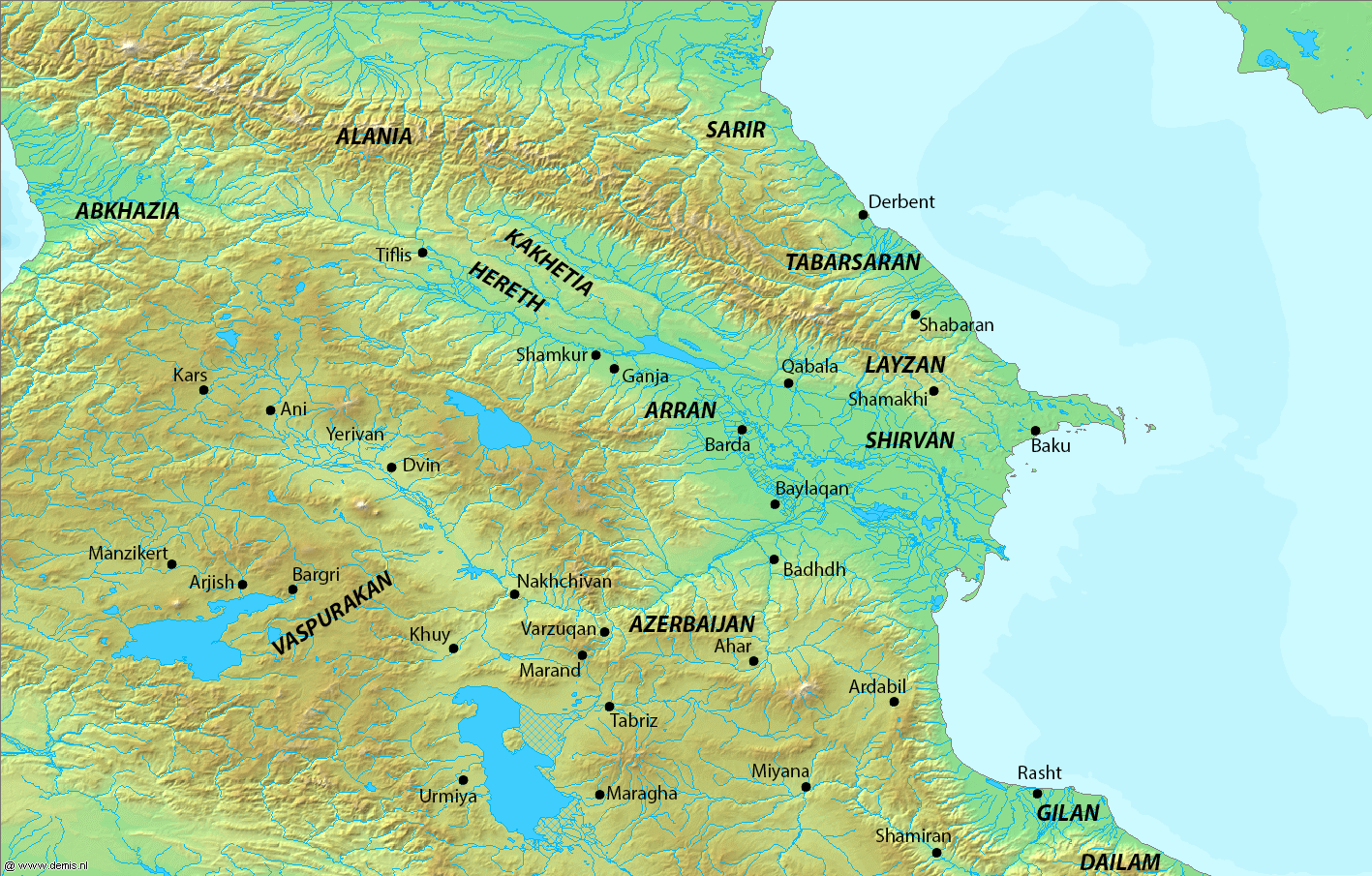
Map of Azerbaijan and Caucasus.

In 949, Rukn al-Dawla sent Abu Mansur to Azerbaijan with orders to take control of the province. Marzuban's brother and the Sallarid ruler of Dailam, Wahsudan, shortly sent an army under the Kurdish general Daisam, but the latter was forced to retreat to Arran. Furthermore, the vizier of Daisam, Ibn Mahmud, betrayed him and joined Abu Mansur, who managed to successfully conquer Azerbaijan, and was shortly appointed as the governor of the region by Rukn al-Dawla. Ibn Mahmud was shortly appointed by Abu Mansur as his personal minister.

However, an unnamed secretary of Abu Mansur, who had greatly helped him during his conquest of Azerbaijan, felt insulted that he had chosen Ibn Mahmud as his minister instead of him, and shortly raised an army, and joined Daisam. Meanwhile, Abu Mansur, who was not used to the environment of Azerbaijan, left the region with Ibn Mahmud, and returned to Ray, thus ending the short-lived Buyid rule over Azerbaijan. In 952 or 953 al-Marzuban escaped, and after some fighting retook control of Azerbaijan. By 955, Rukn al-Dawla made peace with him, and married his daughter.

The fight between the Buyids and the Ziyarids, along with their Samanid overlords over Gurgan and Tabaristan also continued until 955, with control of the provinces switching hands several times. Rukn al-Dawla was forced to sign a treaty with the Samanids, in which he promised to respect the independence of the Ziyarids in exchange for peace. The peace did not last long, however; in 958 Vushmgir occupied Ray for a short time, while in 960 Rukn al-Dawla briefly gained control of Gurgan. In 962, the Buyids managed to take both Gurgan and Tabaristan for a short time.

=== Clash with the ghazis, the second invasion of Azerbaijan and aftermath ===
In 966, a large group of ghazis from Khorasan, plundered Jibal, and also managed to wound Rukn al-Dawla's vizier Abu 'l-Fadl. The ghazis shortly marched towards an important Buyid library in Ray, which was, however, saved by Abu 'l-Fadl's chief librarian Ibn Miskawayh. Rukn al-Dawla shortly sent an army under his nephew Ali ibn Kama which managed to repel the ghazis. The next year, under the orders of Rukn al-Dawla, Abu 'l-Fadl conquered Azerbaijan, and restored Rukn al-Dawla's son-in-law the Sallarid Ibrahim I ibn Marzuban I as the ruler of the region. Abu 'l-Fadl shortly urged Rukn al-Dawla to depose Ibrahim and impose direct Buyid control on the region. Rukn al-Dawla, however, declined his advice. In 970, Rukn al-Dawla sent Abu 'l-Fadl on an expedition against the Kurdish ruler Hasanwayh, who, however, died before he managed to deal with the latter. He was succeeded as vizier by his son Abu'l-Fath ibn al-'Amid, who shortly managed to deal with Hasanwayh.

During the same period, Rukn al-Dawla's fighting with his rivals began to work in his favor, and he was able to sign a less humiliating treaty with the Samanids in 971 or 972, though he continued to pay tribute.

=== Rebellion, family issues and death ===
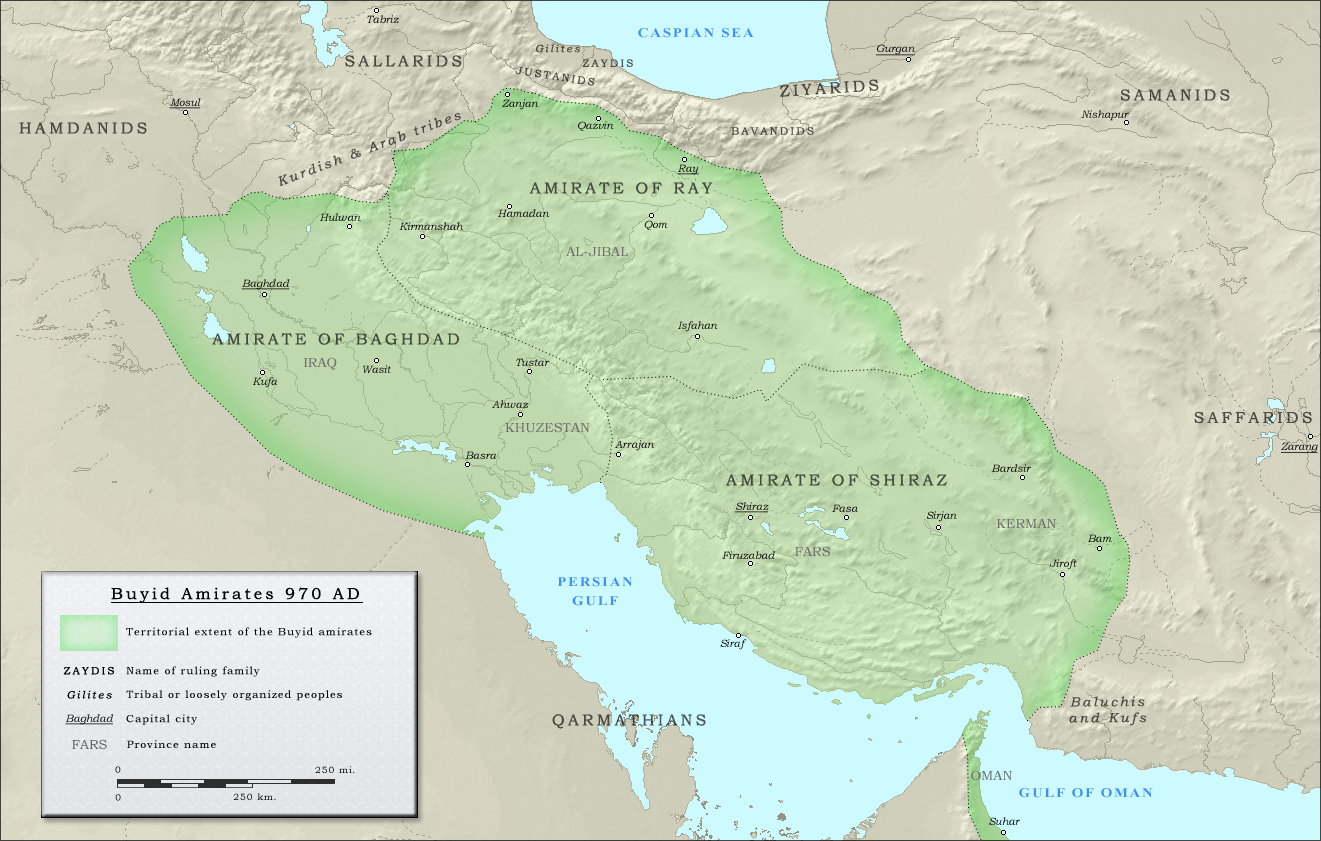
The Buyid amirates in ca. 970

In 974 Rukn al-Dawla sent 'Adud al-Dawla to suppress a large revolt against 'Izz al-Dawla, who had succeeded Mu'izz al-Dawla in Iraq in 967. 'Izz al-Dawla had also recognized Rukn al-Dawla as senior amir, but he and 'Adud al-Dawla had a dislike of each other. 'Adud al-Dawla successfully destroyed the rebellion, but ended up deposing his cousin as well and proclaimed himself the ruler of Iraq. Rukn al-Dawla, however, vehemently protested this, claiming that the line of Mu'izz al-Dawla could not be removed from power. 'Adud al-Dawla's offer to his father to pay tribute for his possession of Iraq was rejected, and he reluctantly reinstated 'Izz al-Dawla and returned to Fars.

'Adud al-Dawla began to grow concerned that his father would deny him the succession as senior amir. Although he had never been explicitly designated as successor, it was assumed that, as the eldest son, the position would be his upon Rukn al-Dawla's death. The fiasco in Iraq, however, cooled the relationship between the two. At this point, Abu'l-Fath attempted to reconcile them by arranging a meeting in Isfahan in January of 976.

The meeting proved to be a success, at least for 'Adud al-Dawla. Rukn al-Dawla may have been pressured to give in to his son's demands; in any case he agreed to name 'Adud al-Dawla as his successor to the senior amirate. All he asked for in exchange was that Ray would go to his second son, Fakhr al-Dawla, while Hamadan would go to a third son, Mu'ayyad al-Dawla. Both sons would recognize 'Adud al-Dawla as senior amir. The issue of Iraq was not discussed.

== Death and legacy ==
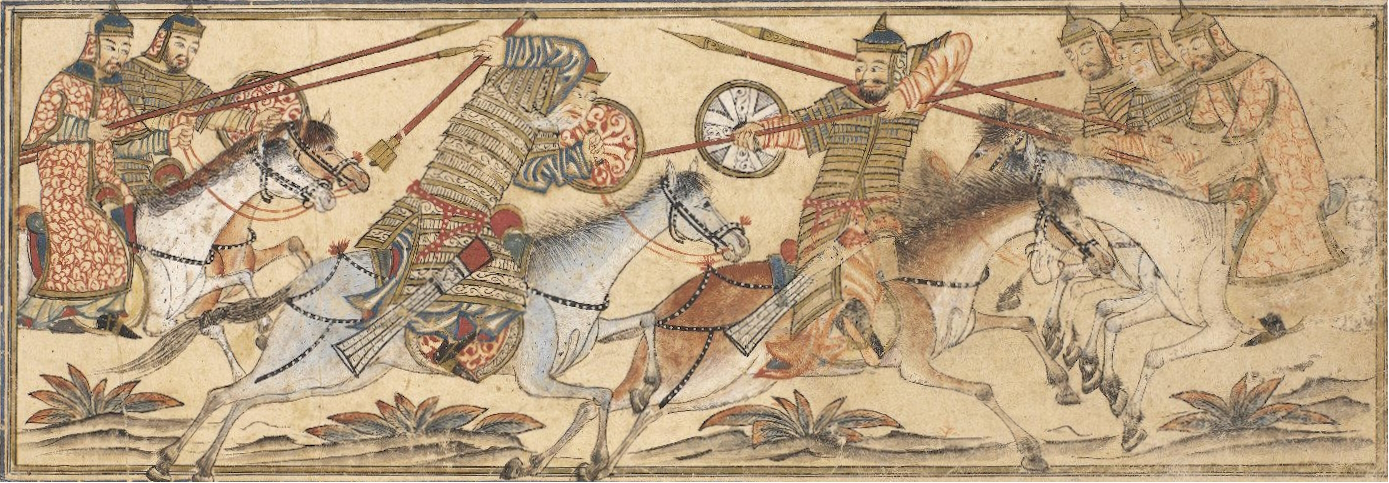
Rukn al-Dawla under attack in September 976. Jami‛ al-Tawarikh (1314–15)

Only a few months later, Rukn al-Dawla died. He was succeeded by his two younger sons in Ray and Hamadan, while 'Adud al-Dawla claimed the senior emirate. 'Izz al-Dawla, however, refused to recognize this, paving the way for conflict between the two sides.

Rukn al-Dawla's campaigns in central Iran were done almost entirely without the support of 'Imad al-Dawla. As a result of this, Rukn al-Dawla was in nearly all aspects independent of his brother. His coins bear only his name after that of the caliph's, and he was considered by contemporary sources to be an independent ruler. For the remainder of the Buyid presence in central Iran, the emirs there were either independent of the rest of the empire, or were the senior emirs that ruled the empire.

The failure of 'Imad al-Dawla to extend his authority over the Buyids of central Iran was later to present problems for the Buyid state, as the descendants of both brothers each considered themselves to be the best candidate for the senior emirate. This led to multiple independent rulers, destroying the unity of the Buyid state and allowing for internal dissent.

In terms of a capital, Isfahan at first served Rukn al-Dawla as his city of choice, and continued to be a favorite even after Ray was captured and the court was moved there. His successors would continue to use Ray as the capital. Like the other Buyids, Rukn al-Dawla was a Shi'ite. While he recognized the authority of the caliph on his coins and allowed the caliph's name to be said in the Friday prayers, in all other aspects he ruled as a Shi'ite. On the other hand, he was no fanatic; he recognized that the Sunni citizens of his empire must be protected in order to prevent internal discord.

== Sources ==
- Amedroz, Henry F.; Margoliouth, David S., eds. (1921). The Eclipse of the 'Abbasid Caliphate. Original Chronicles of the Fourth Islamic Century, Vol. V: The concluding portion of The Experiences of Nations by Miskawaihi, Vol. II: Reigns of Muttaqi, Mustakfi, Muzi and Ta'i. Oxford: Basil Blackwell.
- Bosworth, C. E. (1975). "Iran under the Būyids". In Frye, Richard N. (ed.). The Cambridge History of Iran: From the Arab Invasion to the Saljuqs. Vol. 4. Cambridge: Cambridge University Press. pp. 250–305. ISBN 0-521-20093-8.
- Bosworth, C. E. (2002). "Meskawayh, Abu' Ali Aḥmad". Encyclopædia Iranica, online edition. New York.
- Bürgel, Ch.; Mottahedeh, R. (1988). "ʿAŻOD-AL-DAWLA, ABŪ ŠOJĀʾ FANNĀ ḴOSROW". In Yarshater, Ehsan (ed.). Encyclopædia Iranica. Vol. III/3: Azerbaijan IV–Bačča(-ye) Saqqā. London and New York: Routledge & Kegan Paul. pp. 265–269. ISBN 978-0-71009-115-4.
- Felix, Wolfgang; Madelung, Wilferd (1995). "DEYLAMITES". In Yarshater, Ehsan (ed.). Encyclopædia Iranica. Vol. VII/4: Deylam, John of–Divorce IV. In modern Persia. London and New York: Routledge & Kegan Paul. pp. 342–347. ISBN 978-1-56859-022-6.
- Kennedy, Hugh (2004) [1986]. The Prophet and the Age of the Caliphates: The Islamic Near East from the 6th to the 11th Century (Second ed.). Harlow: Longman. ISBN 978-0-582-40525-7.
- Madelung, W. (1975). "The Minor Dynasties of Northern Iran". In Frye, Richard N. (ed.). The Cambridge History of Iran: From the Arab Invasion to the Saljuqs. Vol. 4. Cambridge: Cambridge University Press. pp. 198–249. ISBN 0-521-20093-8.
- Nagel, Tilman (1990). "BUYIDS". In Yarshater, Ehsan (ed.). Encyclopædia Iranica. Vol. IV/6: Burial II–Calendars II. London and New York: Routledge & Kegan Paul. pp. 578–586. ISBN 978-0-71009-129-1.
- Zetterstéen, K.V. (1987). "Ibn al-′Amīd". E.J. Brill's First Encyclopaedia of Islam, Volume III: E–I′timād al-Dawla. Leiden: BRILL. p. 360. ISBN 90-04-09789-9.

Preceded by None	Buyid Amir (in Ray); 943– September 976	Succeeded by Fakhr al-Dawla
Preceded by None	Buyid Amir (in Hamadan) ?– September 976	Succeeded by Mu'ayyad al-Dawla
