= Abu'l-Fadl ibn al-Amid =

Persian scholar, philosopher and Buyid vizier (912–970)

- ابوالفضل بن عمید
- Born: 912; Qom, Iran
- Died: 8 December 970; Isfahan, Iran
- Occupations: Poet, Statesman
- Writing career
- Language: Arabic
- Genres: Prose, Poetry
- Notable work: Building Cities

Abu 'l-Fadl Muhammad ibn Abi Abdallah al-Husayn ibn Muhammad al-Katib, commonly known after his father as Ibn al-'Amid (died 970) was a Persian statesman who served as the vizier of the Buyid ruler Rukn al-Dawla for thirty years, from 940 until his death in 970. His son, Abu'l-Fath Ali ibn Muhammad, also called Ibn al-'Amid, succeeded him in his office.

== Biography ==
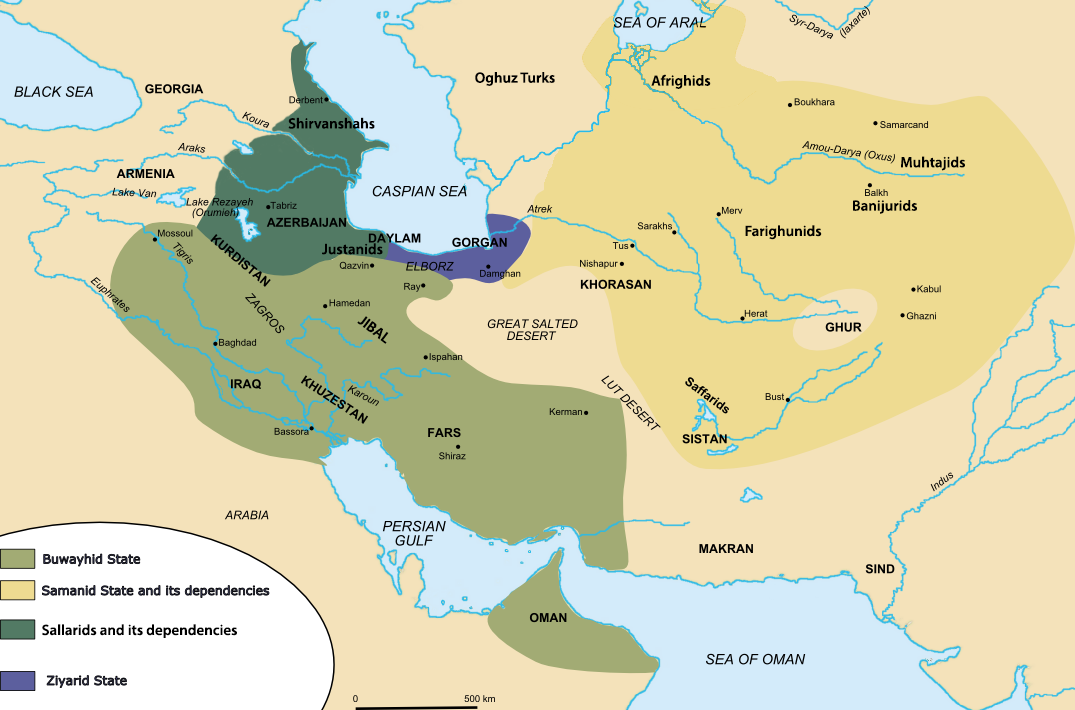
Iran in the mid-10th century

Abu 'l-Fadl was from a low-class family. He was the son of a wheat merchant from Qom, who served as a kātib in Khurasan and later attained the rank of ʿamīd. In 933, he was the vizier of Vushmgir. Abu 'l-Fadl's father was later taken captive by the Samanids. He was assassinated at Isfahan around 935.

Abu 'l-Fadl is first mentioned in 940, when the Buyid ruler Rukn al-Dawla, who greatly favoured him, appointed him as his vizier. In 948, Abu 'l-Fadl served as the tutor of Rukn al-Dawla's son 'Adud al-Dawla. In c. 955, a son of Abu 'l-Fadl's father's former overlord, Muhammad ibn Makan, marched towards the domains of Rukn al-Dawla, conquering the important cities of Isfahan and Ray. During the invasion, Abu 'l-Fadl tried to repel Muhammad army, but was defeated. However, in a second battle, with the aid of Adud al-Dawla, he managed to rout them, reconquer lost territory, and capture Muhammad. Around the same time, another Dailamite military officer named Ruzbahan rebelled against Mu'izz al-Dawla, while Ruzbahan's brother Bullaka rebelled against Adud al-Dawla in Shiraz. Abu 'l-Fadl, however, managed to suppress the rebellions. In the 960s, the prominent official Ibn Miskawayh served Abu 'l-Fadl as his chief librarian in the library in Ray.

In 966, Abu 'l-Fadl was wounded during an invasion by ghazis from Khorasan, who plundered much of Jibal, and marched towards the great library of Ray, which was, however, saved by Ibn Miskawayh. Rukn al-Dawla managed to repel them. The next year, under the orders of Rukn al-Dawla, Abu 'l-Fadl conquered Azerbaijan, and restored the Sallarid Ibrahim I ibn Marzuban I as the ruler of the region. Abu 'l-Fadl urged Rukn al-Dawla to depose Ibrahim and impose direct Buyid control on the region. Rukn al-Dawla, however, declined to take up his advice. In 970, Abu 'l-Fadl was sent on an expedition against the Kurdish ruler Hasanwayh, but Abu 'l-Fadl died before he managed to deal with him. Abu 'l-Fadl was succeeded as vizier by his son Abu'l-Fath who managed to deal with Hasanwayh.

== Work ==
Abu 'l-Fadl enjoyed an excellent reputation as a scholar and became the patron of a literary circle. Amongst his outstanding contributions to science is his book entitled "Building Cities" in which he describes building methods and construction planning. The book exists as an original manuscript in one of the Arabic and Islamic libraries in Istanbul, Turkey.

== Sources ==
- Bosworth, C. E. (1975). "Iran under the Buyids". In Frye, Richard N. (ed.). The Cambridge History of Iran: From the Arab Invasion to the Saljuqs. Vol. 4. Cambridge: Cambridge University Press. pp. 250–305. ISBN 0-521-20093-8.
- Bosworth, C. Edmund (2002). "MESKAVAYH, ABU ʿALI AḤMAD". Encyclopaedia Iranica. London et al.: C. Edmund Bosworth.
- Cahen, Claude (1971). "Ibn al-ʿAmīd". In Lewis, B.; Ménage, V. L.; Pellat, Ch. & Schacht, J. (eds.). The Encyclopaedia of Islam, Second Edition. Volume III: H–Iram. Leiden: E. J. Brill. pp. 703–704. OCLC 495469525.
- Donohue, John J. (2003). The Buwayhid Dynasty in Iraq 334 H./945 to 403 H./1012: Shaping Institutions for the Future. Leiden and Boston: Brill. ISBN 90-04-12860-3.
- Kennedy, Hugh (2004) [1986]. The Prophet and the Age of the Caliphates: The Islamic Near East from the 6th to the 11th Century (Second ed.). Harlow: Longman. ISBN 978-0-582-40525-7.
- Madelung, W. (1975). "The Minor Dynasties of Northern Iran". In Frye, Richard N. (ed.). The Cambridge History of Iran: From the Arab Invasion to the Saljuqs. Vol. 4. Cambridge: Cambridge University Press. pp. 198–249. ISBN 0-521-20093-8.
- Zetterstéen, K.V. (1987). "Ibn al-′Amīd". E.J. Brill's First Encyclopaedia of Islam, Volume III: E–I′timād al-Dawla. Leiden: BRILL. p. 360. ISBN 90-04-09789-9.

Preceded by Abu'l-Hasan 'Abbad ibn Abbas	Vizier of the Buyid amirate of Ray; 940 – 970	Succeeded by Abu'l-Fath Ali ibn Muhammad
