= Fakhr al-Dawla =

Late 10th century Buyid Amir

Amir of Gurgan and Tabaristan
- Reign: 984–997
- Predecessor: Mu'ayyad al-Dawla
- Successor: none

Amir of Hamadan
- Reign: 984–997
- Predecessor: Mu'ayyad al-Dawla
- Successor: Shams al-Dawla

Amir of Rey (Jibal)
- Reign: 976–980
- Predecessor: Rukn al-Dawla
- Successor: Mu'ayyad al-Dawla

Amir of Rey (Jibal)
- Reign: 984–997
- Predecessor: Mu'ayyad al-Dawla
- Successor: Majd al-Dawla
- Died: October or November 997
- Consort: Sayyida Shirin
- Issue: Shams al-Dawla; Majd al-Dawla
Names
- Abu'l-Hasan Ali ibn al-Hasan Fakhr al-Dawla
- Father: Rukn al-Dawla
- Religion: Shia Islam

Abu'l-Hasan Ali ibn al-Hasan (Persian: ابوالحسن علی بن حسن), better known by his laqab of Fakhr al-Dawla (Arabic: 'فخر الدولة, "Pride of the Dynasty") (died October or November 997) was the Buyid amir of Jibal (976–980, 984–997), Hamadan (984–997) and Gurgan and Tabaristan (984–997). He was the second son of Rukn al-Dawla.

== Early life ==
Abu'l-Hasan Ali ibn al-Hasan was born in about 952; he was the son of Rukn al-Dawla and a daughter of the Dailamite Firuzanid nobleman Al-Hasan ibn al-Fairuzan, who was the cousin of Makan ibn Kaki. Abu'l-Hasan received the title of "Fakhr al-Dawla" in 975.

== Rise to power and deposition ==
In January of 976 Rukn al-Dawla met with his eldest son, 'Adud al-Dawla, who ruled in Fars. 'Adud al-Dawla consented to Rukn al-Dawla's request that Fakhr al-Dawla be made the ruler of Ray upon his death, while Hamadan would go to a third son, Mu'ayyad al-Dawla, in exchange for a promise that both of them would recognize him as senior amir. Only eight months later, Rukn al-Dawla died and Fakhr al-Dawla succeeded him in Ray, and shortly had his cousin Ali ibn Kama executed.

Fakhr al-Dawla's reign was shortened by his attempts to repudiate 'Adud al-Dawla's authority over him. He allied with his cousin 'Izz al-Dawla, who ruled in Baghdad and was an enemy of 'Adud al-Dawla. When the former was defeated by 'Adud al-Dawla in 978, Fakhr al-Dawla struck up an alliance with the Ziyarid prince Qabus and asked for support from the Samanids. Mu'ayyad al-Dawla, an ally of 'Adud al-Dawla, was entrusted by the senior amir to eradicate Fakhr al-Dawla's power. He marched into Fakhr al-Dawla's territory, forcing the latter to flee to the Ziyarids. Mu'ayyad al-Dawla continued his campaign, however, causing both Fakhr al-Dawla and Qabus to seek refuge in Samanid Khurasan. Mu'ayyad al-Dawla then ruled Ray as 'Adud al-Dawla's subordinate.

== Return and height of power ==
The deaths of 'Adud al-Dawla in 983 and Mu'ayyad al-Dawla in 984 gave Fakhr al-Dawla the chance to recover his inheritance. Mu'ayyad al-Dawla's vizier, Sahib ibn 'Abbad, held a gathering of the army in Gurgan and convinced it to accept Fakhr al-Dawla as his late master's successor. Fakhr al-Dawla, who was still in Khurasan, traveled to Gurgan, where he was proclaimed amir. This second ascension resulted in him actually possessing more territory than he had owned before his expulsion in 980. In addition to Ray, he now controlled Mu'ayyad al-Dawla's holdings of Hamadan, as well as the formerly Ziyarid lands of Gurgan and Tabaristan. Taking the title of Shâhanshâh, he made Sahib ibn 'Abbad his vizier, and took his advice not to restore Qabus to his former territory.

Fakhr al-Dawla managed to gain recognition as senior amir by Taj al-Dawla and Diya' al-Dawla, who had in the years following 'Adud al-Dawla's death become the rulers of Khuzestan and Basra respectively. This diplomatic success was of little consequence, however, as the two princes were relatively minor and were forced to seek refuge in Ray when Sharaf al-Dawla, who ruled in Fars, expelled them from their provinces. At the same time, Fakhr al-Dawla attempted to gain a footing in Samanid Khurasan, by supporting the Turkish rebel Tash in his attempts to recover the governorship of that province. This support did not help him, however, as he was defeated and forced to flee to Gurgan at the end of 987. Fakhr al-Dawla made him the governor of Gurgan, where Tash died in 988.

Sharaf al-Dawla, who had united Fars and Iraq in 987, had died in 988 and left his brother Baha' al-Dawla his empire. Another brother, Samsam al-Dawla, seized Fars, Kerman and Khuzestan, depriving Baha' al-Dawla of those areas. Fakhr al-Dawla attempted to take advantage of their rivalry by invading Khuzestan, with the goal of cutting off Iraq from Fars. This action failed due to the rough terrain and climate, and succeeded only in uniting the two brothers against him.

This threat did not last, however, as Samsam al-Dawla and Sharaf al-Dawla eventually resumed hostilities against each other. Only a few years later, Samsam al-Dawla recognized Fakhr al-Dawla as senior amir in an effort to secure his increasingly weak position. This marked the height of Fakhr al-Dawla's power; in addition to his own territories, he now had authority over Samsam al-Dawla, who ruled Fars, Kerman, Khuzestan, and Oman.

== Campaign against Khurasan and death ==
Now the ruler of all of Buyid Iran, Fakhr al-Dawla, with the support of his vizier Sahib ibn 'Abbad, decided to undertake a campaign to seize Khurasan from the Samanids. In 994 or 995 he invaded the province, but was ultimately unsuccessful. Mahmud, the son of the Ghaznavid ruler Sebük Tigin, had been appointed by the Samanids as governor of Khurasan, causing the Ghaznavids to support the defenders. Despite his large army, Fakhr al-Dawla was forced to retreat.

In 995 Sahib ibn 'Abbad died. The vizier had played an important part in maintaining Fakhr al-Dawla's grip on Buyid Iran, and his loss was unfortunate. In 997 Fakhr al-Dawla himself died. His eldest son, Majd al-Dawla, succeeded him in Ray, while his younger son, Shams al-Dawla, succeeded him in Hamadan. Due to their youth, Fakhr al-Dawla's wife, Sayyida Shirin, assumed the regency. Fakhr al-Dawla's death marked the beginning of the decline of the Buyids in northern Iran; shortly afterwards Qabus managed to restore Ziyarid rule to Gurgan and Tabaristan.

== Sources ==
- Bosworth, C. E. (1975). "Iran under the Būyids". In Frye, Richard N. (ed.). The Cambridge History of Iran: From the Arab Invasion to the Saljuqs. Vol. 4. Cambridge: Cambridge University Press. pp. 250–305. ISBN 0-521-20093-8.
- Nagel, Tilman (1990). "BUYIDS". In Yarshater, Ehsan (ed.). Encyclopædia Iranica. Vol. IV/6: Burial II–Calendars II. London and New York: Routledge & Kegan Paul. pp. 578–586. ISBN 978-0-71009-129-1.
- Cahen, Cl. (1965). "Fak̲h̲r al-Dawla". In Lewis, B.; Pellat, Ch. & Schacht, J. (eds.). The Encyclopaedia of Islam, Second Edition. Volume II: C–G. Leiden: E. J. Brill. OCLC 495469475.

Preceded by Rukn al-Dawla	Buyid Amir (in Ray); 976–980	Succeeded by Mu'ayyad al-Dawla
Preceded by Mu'ayyad al-Dawla	Buyid Amir (in Ray, Second Reign); 984–997	Succeeded by Majd al-Dawla
Preceded by Mu'ayyad al-Dawla	Buyid Amir (in Hamadan); 984–997	Succeeded by Shams al-Dawla
Preceded by Mu'ayyad al-Dawla	Buyid Amir (in Gurgan/Tabaristan); 984–997	Succeeded by None
