= List of people known as the Elder or the Younger =

"The Elder" and "the Younger" are epithets generally used to distinguish between two individuals, often close relatives. In some instances, one of the pair is much more famous, and hence not known as "the Elder" or "the Younger", e.g. Carl Linnaeus; in such cases, they are not listed in a separate column but rather in the notes of the lesser-known person.

== People ==
=== Ancient world ===
Ordered alphabetically by first name
| The Elder | Lifespan | Notes | Relationship | The Younger | Lifespan | Notes |
|---|---|---|---|---|---|---|
| Adobogiona the Elder | fl. c. 90 BC–c. 50 BC | Galatian princess | Mother of | Adobogiona the Younger | fl. c. 70 BC–c. 30 BC | Illegitimate daughter of King of Pontus Mithridates VI Eupator |
| Agrippina the Elder | c. 14 BC–33 AD | Wife of Roman general Germanicus | Mother of | Agrippina the Younger | 15–59 | Roman empress, wife and niece of Emperor Claudius |
| Aristaeus the Elder | 370 BC–300 BC | Greek mathematician. Pappus of Alexandria refers to him as the Elder, but nothing is known about the other Aristaeus. | | | | |
| Aristippus | c. 435 BC–c. 356 BC | Greek Hedonistic philosopher | Grandfather of | Aristippus the Younger | c. 380 BC – ? | Greek philosopher |
| Aristomachos I | died c. 240 BC | Greek tyrant | Father of | Aristomachos II | died. c. 223 BC | Greek general and tyrant |
| Arnobius | died c. 330 | Christian apologist | | Arnobius the Younger | fl. 460 | Christian priest or bishop in Gaul and author |
| Basil the Elder | died 360 | Christian saint, son of saint Macrina the Elder and father of saint Macrina the Younger (see below) | | Basil the Younger | died 944 or 952 | Byzantine Greek holy man and visionary; no consensus whether Basil was a real person or a fabrication |
| Cato the Elder | 234 BC–149 BC | Roman soldier, senator and historian | Great-grandfather of | Cato the Younger | 95 BC–46 BC | Roman senator |
| Cephisodotus the Elder | fl. c. 400–c. 360 BC | Greek sculptor | Grandfather of | Cephisodotus the Younger | 4th century BC | Greek sculptor |
| | | | | Cicero Minor | 68 BC–28 BC or later | Son of Cicero |
| Cyrus the Great | c. 600 BC–530 BC | Founder of the Achaemenid Empire, the first Persian empire | | Cyrus the Younger | died 401 BC | Achaemenid prince and general |
| Dionysius I of Syracuse | c. 432 BC–367 BC | Greek tyrant of Syracuse | Father of | Dionysius II of Syracuse | c. 397 BC–343 BC | Greek politician and ruler of Syracuse |
| Domitilla the Elder | died before 69 | Wife of Vespasian; died before he became Emperor of Rome | Mother of | Domitilla the Younger | c. 45–c. 66 | Only daughter of Vespasian |
| Drusus the Elder / Nero Claudius Drusus | 38 BC–9 BC | Roman politician and general | Uncle of | Drusus Julius Caesar | 14 BC–23 AD | Son and heir of Roman emperor Tiberius |
| Faustina the Elder | c. 100–140 | Wife of Roman emperor Antoninus Pius | Mother of | Faustina the Younger | c. 130–175/176 | Wife of Roman emperor Marcus Aurelius |
| | | | | Gaius Marius the Younger | c. 110 BC–82 BC | Ancient Roman general, politician and consul; son of Gaius Marius, a general and statesman |
| Hillel the Elder | c. 110 BC–10 AD | Jewish religious leader, sage and scholar, sometimes confused with Hillel II (fl. 320–385) | | | | |
| | | | | Homerus of Byzantium | fl. early 3rd century BC | Ancient Greek grammarian and tragic poet, sometimes called ho Neoteros ("the Younger") to distinguish him from the poet Homer |
| Hydarnes | 6th and 5th centuries BC | Persian satrap | Father of | Hydarnes the Younger | 5th century BC | Persian satrap, leader of the Immortals during the Battle of Thermopylae (480 BC) |
| Intef the Elder | fl. c. 2150 BC | Ancient Egyptian nomarch of Thebes; ancestor of Intef I (fl. late 22nd century BC), a pharaoh of the 11th Dynasty | | | | |
| Julia Major | before 103 BC–? | Elder sister of Julius Caesar | Elder sister of | Julia Minor | before 100 BC–51 BC | Also an elder sister of Julius Caesar, as well as grandmother of Emperor Augustus |
| Julia the Elder | 39 BC–14 AD | Daughter of Emperor Augustus and second wife of Emperor Tiberius | Mother of | Julia the Younger | 19 BC–c. 29 AD | Daughter of Julia the Elder's second husband, Marcus Vipsanius Agrippa |
| Macarius of Egypt | c. 300–391 | Coptic Christian monk and hermit | Contemporary of | Macarius of Alexandria | c. 300–395 | Egyptian monk and Coptic saint |
| Macrina the Elder | before 270–c. 340 | Christian saint | Grandmother of | Macrina the Younger | c. 327–July 379 | Christian saint |
| Melania the Elder | c. 350–before 410 or c. 417 | Christian saint | Grandmother of | Melania the Younger | c. 383–439 | Christian saint |
| Metrodorus of Lampsacus (the elder) | died 464 BC | Greek philosopher | | Metrodorus of Lampsacus (the younger) | 331/0 BC–278/7 BC | Greek philosopher |
| Miltiades the Elder | c. 590 BC–525 BC | Athenian politician | Half uncle of | Miltiades | c. 550 BC–489 BC | Athenian general |
| Nilus of Sinai | died 430 or 451 | Christian saint | | Nilus the Younger | 910–1005 | Christian saint, monk and abbot |
| Octavia the Elder | died after 29 BC | Half-sister of the first Roman emperor, Augustus | Elder half-sister of | Octavia the Younger | c. 66 BC–11 BC | Elder sister of Emperor Augustus |
| Olympiodorus the Elder | 5th century | Byzantine philosopher | | Olympiodorus the Younger | 6th century | Byzantine philosopher, astrologer and teacher |
| Osorkon the Elder | fl. 992 BC–986 BC | Ancient Egyptian pharaoh of the 21st Dynasty; granduncle of Osorkon I (fl. 922 BC–887 BC), a pharaoh of the 22nd Dynasty | | | | |
| | | | | Philip II | 237–249 | Son and heir of the Roman emperor Philip the Arab |
| Philostratus of Lemnos | c. 190–c. 230 | Greek sophist/philosopher | Possibly the grandfather of | Philostratus the Younger | 3rd century | Greek sophist/philosopher |
| Pliny the Elder | 23/24–79 | Roman author, naturalist, natural philosopher, and naval and army commander | Uncle of | Pliny the Younger | 61–c. 113 | Roman lawyer, author and magistrate |
| Polykleitos | died c. 420 BC | Greek sculptor | Father of | Polykleitos the Younger | fl. c. 4th century BC | Greek architect and sculptor |
| Poppaea Sabina the Elder | c. 10–c. 47 | Roman aristocrat | Mother of | Poppaea Sabina | 30–65 | Second wife of the Emperor Nero |
| Publius Vitellius the Elder | 1st century BC | Ancient Roman eques and procurator, grandfather of Emperor Vitellus | Father of | Publius Vitellius the Younger | died c. 31 | Roman commander of two legions |
| Scipio Africanus | 236/235 BC–183 BC | Roman general in the Second Punic War and statesman | Adoptive grandfather of | Scipio Africanus the Younger / Scipio Aemilianus | 185 BC–129 BC | Roman general in the Third Punic War and statesman |
| Seneca the Elder | c. 54 BC–c. 39 AD | Roman writer | Father of | Seneca the Younger | c. 4 BC–65 AD | Roman philosopher, statesman, dramatist and satirist |
| Serapion the Elder / Yahya ibn Sarafyun | second half of the 9th century | Christian physician | | Serapion the Younger | 12th or 13th century | Author of a medicinal-botany book titled The Book of Simple Medicaments |
| Simeon Stylites | c. 390–459 | Syrian Christian ascetic/stylite noted for living 37 years on a small platform on top of a pillar | | Simeon Stylites the Younger | 521–596/597 | Stylite and Eastern Orthodox and Roman Catholic saint |
| Tarquin the Elder / Lucius Tarquinius Priscus | fl. c. 616–578 BC | Legendary fifth king of Rome | | | | |
| Theodosius the Elder | died 376 | Roman general | Great-grandfather of | Theodosius II | 401–450 | Roman emperor |
| | | | | Tigranes the Younger | fl. 65 BC | Briefly King of Sophene; son of Tigranes the Great, King of Armenia |

=== Middle Ages ===
Note: A few pairs straddle the boundary between the Middle Ages and the modern era—c. 1500—and are listed in both sections.

Ordered alphabetically by first name
| The Elder | Lifespan | Notes | Relationship | The Younger | Lifespan | Notes |
|---|---|---|---|---|---|---|
| Æbbe of Coldingham | c. 615–683 | Anglian abbess and noblewoman | | Æbbe the Younger | died 870 | Anglo-Saxon abbess and saint |
| Aldus Manutius | c. 1449/1452–1515 | Italian printer and humanist | Grandfather of | Aldus Manutius the Younger | 1547–1597 | Italian printer and humanist |
| | | | | Anselm of Lucca | 1036–1086 | Italian Catholic bishop and saint, known as the Anselm the Younger to distinguish him from his uncle, Pope Alexander II, born Anselm of Baggio |
| Antonio da Sangallo the Elder | c. 1453–1534 | Italian architect | Uncle of | Antonio da Sangallo the Younger | 1484–1546 | Italian architect |
| Bal'ami the Elder / Abu'l-Fadl al-Bal'ami | died 940 | Vizier of Nasr II | Relative of | Bal'ami the Younger / Abu Ali Bal'ami | died between 992 and 997 | Persian historian, writer and vizier of the Samanid Empire |
| Bardas Phokas the Elder | c. 878–c. 968 | Byzantine general | Granduncle of | Bardas Phokas the Younger | c. 940–989 | Byzantine general who took a conspicuous part in three revolts for and against the ruling Macedonian dynasty |
| Barisan of Ibelin | died 1150 | Lord of Ramla | Father of | Barisan the Younger / Balian of Ibelin | c. 1143–1193 | A crusader noble of the Kingdom of Jerusalem, Lord of Ibelin |
| Çandarlı Kara Halil Hayreddin Pasha | died 1387 | First grand vizier of the Ottoman Empire | Grandfather of | Çandarlı Halil Pasha the Younger | died 1453 | 11th grand vizier of the Ottoman Empire |
| Carthage the Elder | died 6th century | Irish saint, bishop and abbot | Claimed to be the foster father of | Carthage the Younger / Mo Chutu of Lismore | died 639 | Irish saint and abbot |
| | | | | Charles the Younger | c. 772–811 | King of the Franks, son of Charlemagne (also known as Charles the Great) |
| Ciarán of Saigir | died c. 530 | Bishop of Saigir, one of the Twelve Apostles of Ireland, considered the first saint to have been born in Ireland | | Ciarán of Clonmacnoise | c. 516–c. 549 | Saint, one of the Twelve Apostles of Ireland and first abbot of Clonmacnoise |
| Conrad the Elder, Count of Argengau | died c. 864 | | Father of | Conrad the Younger, Count of Auxerre | died 876 | |
| Conrad, Duke of Thuringia | died 906 | | Father of | Conrad I of Germany | c. 881–918 | King of East Francia |
| Diebold Schilling the Elder | c. 1436–1439 – 1486 | Author of several Swiss illustrated chronicles | Uncle of | Diebold Schilling the Younger | before 1460–1515 | Swiss chronicler, priest, notary and soldier |
| Eadnoth the Elder | fl. up to 991? | Prior of Ramsey before his duties were assumed by Eadnoth the Younger | Contemporary of | Eadnoth the Younger | fl. c. 992–1016 | English monk and prelate, Abbot of Ramsey and Bishop of Dorchester |
| Edward the Elder | c. 874–17 July 924 | King of the Anglo-Saxons and son of Alfred the Great; called "the Elder" to distinguish him from Edward the Martyr, King of the English (c. 962–978) | | | | |
| Henri Estienne (elder) | 1460 or 1470–1520 | French printer | Grandfather of | Henri Estienne | 1528 or 1531–1598 | French printer and classical scholar |
| Berengar Fredol the Elder | 1250–1323 | French canon lawyer and Cardinal-Bishop of Frascati | Uncle of | Berengar Fredol the Younger | died 1323 | Bishop of Béziers, Cardinal-Priest of SS. Nereo e Achilleo and Cardinal-Bishop of Porto |
| | | | | Fulk, King of Jerusalem | c. 1089/1092–1143 | Also Count of Anjou, son of Fulk IV, Count of Anjou (1043–1109) |
| | | | | Harald the Younger | fl. 841–842 | Viking leader, nephew of Harald Klak, a king of Jutland |
| Hans Holbein the Elder | c. 1460–1524 | German painter | Father of | Hans Holbein the Younger | c. 1497–1543 | German-Swiss painter and printmaker |
| Henry IV, Duke of Brunswick-Lüneburg | 1463–1514 | Also Prince of Wolfenbüttel | Father of | Henry V, Duke of Brunswick-Lüneburg | 1489–1568 | Also Prince of Brunswick-Wolfenbüttel |
| Heraclius the Elder | died 610 | Byzantine general | Father of | Heraclius | c. 575–641 | Byzantine emperor |
| Hugh Despenser the Elder | 1261–1326 | Earl of Winchester and chief adviser to King Edward II of England | Father of | Hugh Despenser the Younger | c. 1287/1289–1326 | Royal chamberlain and a favourite of King Edward II |
| Çandarlı Ibrahim Pasha the Elder | died 1429 | Grand Vizier of the Ottoman Empire | Grandfather of | Çandarlı Ibrahim Pasha the Younger | 1429–1499 | Grand Vizier of the Ottoman Empire |
| Inge the Elder | died c. 1105–1110 | King of Sweden | Uncle of | Inge the Younger | fl. c. 1110–c. 1125 | King of Sweden |
| Isaiah di Trani | c. 1180–c. 1250 | Italian Talmudist | Grandfather of | Isaiah di Trani the Younger | 13th century | Italian Talmudist and commentator |
| Jakob Fugger the Elder | 1398–1469 | German master weaver, town councillor and merchant, father of German merchant, mining entrepreneur, and banker Jakob Fugger (1459–1525) | | | | |
| | | | | Justin II | died 578 | Byzantine emperor, nephew of Emperor Justin I |
| Leo Phokas the Elder | fl. 910s | Byzantine general | Uncle of | Leo Phokas the Younger | 915/920–after 971 | Byzantine general |
| Lorenzo the Elder | c. 1395–1440 | Italian banker, great-uncle of Lorenzo de' Medici (1449–1492), aka Lorenzo the Magnificent, Lord of Florence | | | | |
| Lorenzo Costa | 1460–1535 | Italian painter | Grandfather of | Lorenzo Costa the Younger | 1537–1583 | Italian painter |
| | | | | Louis the Younger | 830/835–882 | King of Saxony and King of Bavaria, son of Louis the German, first king of East Francia |
| | | | | Louis VII of France | 1120–1180 | King of the Franks, son of Louis VI of France, King of the Franks |
| | | | | Louis II of Italy | 825–875 | King of Italy and Holy Roman Emperor, grandson of Louis the Pious, King of the Franks, co-emperor with his father, Charlemagne, and King of Aquitaine |
| Lucas Cranach the Elder | c. 1472–1553 | German painter and printmaker | Father of | Lucas Cranach the Younger | 1515–1586 | German painter and portraitist |
| Martin of Aragon / Martin the Elder | 1356–1410 | King of Aragon, Valencia, Sardinia and Corsica, Count of Barcelona and King of Sicily | Father of | Martin I of Sicily / Martin the Younger | c. 1374/1376–1409 | King of Sicily |
| | | | | Michael Psellos | 1017/1018–1078? or 1096? | Byzantine Greek monk, savant, writer, philosopher, imperial courtier, historian and music theorist sometimes called "the younger", though it is now believed that this was an error and there is no Michael Psellos the elder |
| Mircea the Elder | c. 1355–1418 | Voivode of Wallachia | Grandfather of | Mircea II of Wallachia | 1428–1447 | Voivode of Wallachia |
| Miro the Elder | died 896 | Count of Conflent | Father of | Miró II of Cerdanya | 878?–927 | Count of Cerdanya and Count of Besalú |
| Nikephoros Bryennios the Elder | fl. 1071–1094/5? | Byzantine Greek general who attempted to overthrow the emperor | Father or grandfather of | Nikephoros Bryennios the Younger | 1062–1137 | Byzantine general, statesman and historian |
| Nikephoros Phokas the Elder | died 895/6 or c. 900 | Byzantine general, grandfather of Byzantine emperor Nikephoros II Phokas | | | | |
| Olympiodorus the Elder | 5th century | Byzantine philosopher | | Olympiodorus the Younger | c. 495–570 | Byzantine philosopher, astrologer and teacher |
| Paolo Caylina the Elder | c. 1425–after 1486 | Italian painter | Uncle of | Paolo Caylina the Younger | c. 1485–c. 1545 | Italian painter |
| Pepin of Landen | c. 580–640 | Mayor of the palace of Austrasia | | Pepin the Short | c. 714–768 | King of the Franks |
| Pierfrancesco the Elder | 1430–1476 | Italian nobleman, banker, diplomat, and member of the Medici family | Grandfather of | Pierfrancesco the Younger | 1487–1525 | Italian banker |
| Pier Paolo Vergerio the Elder | 1370–1444/1445 | Italian humanist, statesman, pedagogist and canon lawyer | | Pier Paolo Vergerio | c. 1498–1565 | Italian papal nuncio, later Protestant reformer |
| Jan Rombouts the Elder | c. 1480–1535 | Flemish painter, draftsman, printmaker and glass designer and painter, father of the painter Jan Rombouts the Younger | | | | |
| Serapion the Elder / Yahya ibn Sarafyun | Second half of the 9th century | Syriac Christian physician | | Serapion the Younger | 12th or 13th century | Author of a medicinal-botany book entitled The Book of Simple Medicaments |
| Simon de Montfort, 5th Earl of Leicester | c. 1175–1218 | A French military leader in the Fourth Crusade and the Albigensian Crusade | Grandfather of | Simon de Montfort the Younger | 1240–1271 | English rebel against King Henry III |
| Sten Sture the Elder | 1440–1503 | Regent of Sweden | Distant relative of | Sten Sture the Younger | 1493–1520 | Swedish nobleman, regent of Sweden |
| | | | | Suitbert the Younger | fl. 7th century | Anglo-Saxon Christian saint and abbot; unrelated to Suitbert of Kaiserswerth, another 7th-century Anglo-Saxon Christian saint |
| Sverker the Elder | c. 1100–1156 | King of Sweden | Grandfather of | Sverker the Younger | before 1167–1210 | King of Sweden |
| Ulrich Fugger the Elder | 1441–1510 | German businessman, brother of Jakob Fugger | Father of | Ulrich Fugger the Younger | 1490–1525 | German businessman |
| | | | | Wilfrid II | died 745 or 746 | Anglo-Saxon saint and bishop; no relation to Wilfrid (c. 633–709 or 710), also an Anglo-Saxon saint and bishop of York |
| William I, Count of Nassau-Siegen | 1487–1559 | Father of Prince William the Silent/William of Orange (1533–1584), leader of the Dutch revolt against the Spanish Habsburgs | | | | |
| William I, Landgrave of Lower Hesse | 1466–1515 | Elder brother of William II, Landgrave of Hesse (1469–1509), also known as "William the Middle" | Uncle of | William III, Landgrave of Hesse | 1471–1500 | |

=== Modern era ===
Ordered alphabetically by last name when possible, by first name when not.
| The Elder | Lifespan | Notes | Relationship | The Younger | Lifespan | Notes |
|---|---|---|---|---|---|---|
| George Adams (scientist, died 1772) | c. 1709–1772 | English instrument maker and science writer | Father of | George Adams (scientist, died 1795) | 1750–1795 | English scientist, optician and science writer |
| | | | | Gyula Andrássy the Younger | 1860–1929 | Hungarian politician; son of Gyula Andrássy, Prime Minister of Hungary |
| Ferdinand van Apshoven the Elder | 1576–1654 or 1655 | Flemish painter | Father of | Ferdinand van Apshoven the Younger | 1630–1694 | Flemish painter and art dealer |
| | | | | Tom Arnold / Thomas Arnold the Younger | 1823–1900 | English literary scholar, son of Thomas Arnold, headmaster of Rugby School |
| Augustus the Elder, Duke of Brunswick-Lüneburg | 1568–1636 | Also Lutheran Bishop of Ratzeburg and Prince of Lüneburg | Cousin of | Augustus II, Duke of Brunswick | 1579–1666 | Duke of Brunswick-Lüneburg and Prince of Brunswick-Wolfenbüttel |
| Ayşe Sultan (daughter of Mustafa II) | 1696–1752 | Ottoman princess | Cousin of | Ayşe Sultan (daughter of Ahmed III) | 1715–1775 | Ottoman princess |
| Caspar Bartholin the Elder | 1585–1629 | Danish physician, scientist and theologian | Grandfather of | Caspar Bartholin the Younger | 1655–1738 | Danish anatomist |
| Álvaro de Bazán the Elder | 1506–1558 | Spanish admiral | Father of | Álvaro de Bazán, Marquis of Santa Cruz | 1526–1588 | Spanish admiral |
| Erik Benzelius the Elder | 1632–1709 | Swedish theologian and Archbishop of Uppsala | Father of | Erik Benzelius the Younger | 1675–1743 | Swedish priest, theologian, librarian, Bishop of Linköping and Archbishop of Uppsala |
| John Bettes the Elder | fl. c. 1531–1570 | English painter | Father of | John Bettes the Younger | Died 1616 | English portrait painter |
| George Bickham the Elder | 1684–1758 | English writing master and engraver | Father of | George Bickham the Younger | c. 1706–1771 | English etcher and engraver, printseller and one of the first English caricaturists |
| | | | | José Bonifácio the Younger | 1827–1886 | French-born Brazilian poet, teacher and senator, grandnephew of Brazilian statesman, naturalist, mineralist, professor and poet José Bonifácio de Andrada e Silva |
| Nicholas Bourbon (the elder) | 1503–1550 | French poet | Granduncle of | Nicholas Bourbon (the younger) | 1574–1644 | French poet |
| | | | | John Bowdler the Younger | 1783–1815 | English essayist, poet and lawyer; son of John Bowdler, an English moral reformer and writer |
| Michael Boyle | c. 1580–1635 | Bishop of Waterford and Lismore | Uncle of | Michael Boyle | c. 1609–1702 | Church of Ireland bishop, Archbishop of Dublin, Archbishop of Armagh and Lord Chancellor of Ireland |
| Per Brahe the Elder | 1520–1590 | Swedish count, Governor of Stockholm Castle, Lord High Justiciar of Sweden and Governor of Norrland | Grandfather of | Per Brahe the Younger | 1602–1680 | Swedish soldier, Privy Councillor, Lord High Steward, Governor General of Finland and author |
| John Bramston the Elder | 1577–1654 | English judge and Chief Justice of the King's Bench | Father of | John Bramston the Younger | 1611–1700 | English lawyer and politician |
| John Brinsley the Elder | fl. 1581–1624 | English schoolmaster known for his educational works | Father of | John Brinsley the Younger | 1600–1665 | English nonconforming clergyman and ejected minister |
| Jan Brueghel the Elder | 1568–1625 | Flemish painter and draughtsman | Father of | Jan Brueghel the Younger | 1601–1678 | Flemish Baroque painter |
| Pieter Bruegel the Elder | c. 1525 to 1530–1569 | Dutch Flemish painter and printmaker | Father of | Pieter Brueghel the Younger | 1564–1638 | Flemish painter |
| | | | | Michelangelo Buonarroti the Younger | 1568–1646 | Florentine poet, librettist and man of letters, grandnephew of Michelangelo |
| Edmund Calamy the Elder | 1600–1666 | English Presbyterian church leader and divine | Father of | Edmund Calamy the Younger | c. 1635–1685 | English ejected minister |
| John Calcraft | 1726–1772 | English army agent and politician | Father of | John Calcraft the Younger | 1765–1831 | English landowner and Member of Parliament; bastard son of Calcraft the Elder. |
| | | | | Luis de Carvajal the Younger | c. 1566–1596 | Crypto-Jewish writer, nephew of Spanish conquistador Luis de Carvajal y de la Cueva |
| Paolo Caylina the Elder | c. 1425–after 1486 | Italian painter | Uncle of | Paolo Caylina the Younger | c. 1485–c. 1545 | Italian painter |
| John Cleveley the Elder | c. 1712–1777 | English marine painter | Father of | John Cleveley the Younger | 1747–1786 | British marine painter |
| George Colman the Elder | 1732–1794 | English dramatist, essayist and theatre owner | Father of | George Colman the Younger | 1762–1836 | English dramatist and miscellaneous writer |
| William Corden the Elder | 1795–1867 | English portrait painter and miniaturist | Father of | William Corden the Younger | 1819–1900 | Portrait painter |
| Lorenzo Costa | 1460–1535 | Italian painter | Grandfather of | Lorenzo Costa the Younger | 1537–1583 | Italian painter |
| Guillaume Coustou the Elder | 1677–1746 | French sculptor | Father of | Guillaume Coustou the Younger | 1716–1777 | French sculptor |
| Lucas Cranach the Elder | c. 1472–1553 | German painter and printmaker | Father of | Lucas Cranach the Younger | 1515–1586 | German painter and portraitist |
| George Cuitt the Elder | 1743–1818 | British painter | Father of | George Cuitt the Younger | 1779–1854 | British etcher and painter |
| François de Cuvilliés | 1695–1768 | Bavarian decorative designer and architect born in the Spanish Netherlands | Father of | François de Cuvilliés the Younger | 1731–1777 | German architect, engraver, draftsman, engineer and author |
| George Dance the Elder | 1695–1768 | British architect | Father of | George Dance the Younger | 1741–1825 | English architect, surveyor and portraitist |
| Johann Jakob Dorner the Elder | 1741–1813 | German painter | Father of | Johann Jakob Dorner the Younger | 1775–1852 | Bavarian painter |
| Louis Ferdinand Elle the Elder | 1612–1689 | French portrait painter | Father of | Louis Ferdinand Elle the Younger | 1648–1717 | French portrait painter |
| Edward Ellice (merchant) | 1783–1863 | British merchant and politician | Father of | Edward Ellice (MP for St Andrews) | 1810–1880 | British politician |
| Henri Estienne (elder) | 1460 or 1470–1520 | French printer | Grandfather of | Henri Estienne | 1528 or 1531–1598 | French printer and classical scholar |
| Axel von Fersen the Elder | 1719–1794 | Swedish statesman and soldier, Lord Marshal of the Riksdag of the Estates | Father of | Axel von Fersen the Younger | 1755–1810 | Swedish count, Marshal of the Realm of Sweden, General of Horse in the Royal Swedish Army, one of the Lords of the Realm, aide-de-camp to Rochambeau in the American Revolutionary War, diplomat and statesman |
| Giles Fletcher, the Elder | c. 1548–1611 | English poet, diplomat and Member of Parliament | Father of | Giles Fletcher | 1586?–1623 | English poet and cleric |
| Nicholas Fortescue the Elder | 1575?–1633 | English Chamberlain of the Exchequer | Father of | Nicholas Fortescue the Younger | 1605?–1644 | A Knight of St John |
| Frans Francken the Elder | 1542–1616 | Flemish painter | Father of | Frans Francken the Younger | 1581–1642 | Flemish painter |
| Ulrich Fugger the Elder | 1441–1510 | German businessman, brother of Jakob Fugger | Father of | Ulrich Fugger the Younger | 1490–1525 | German businessman |
| Marcus Gheeraerts the Elder | c. 1520–c. 1590 | Flemish painter, draughtsman, print designer and etcher | Father of | Marcus Gheeraerts the Younger | c. 1561/62–1636 | Flemish painter |
| William Goode, the elder | 1762–1816 | English evangelical Anglican clergyman, father of William Goode, English cleric, a leader of the evangelicals of the Church of England and Dean of Ripon | | | | |
| Charles Grignion the Elder | 1721–1810 | British engraver and draughtsman | Uncle of | Charles Grignion the Younger | 1754–1804 | British painter and engraver |
| George Gwilt | 1746–1807 | English architect | Father of | George Gwilt the younger | 1775–1856 | English architect and writer on architecture |
| Frans Hals | c. 1582–1666 | Dutch painter | Father of | Frans Hals the Younger | 1618–1669 | Dutch painter |
| Hans the Elder, Duke of Schleswig-Holstein-Haderslev | 1545–1622 | | Uncle of | Hans the Younger, Duke of Schleswig-Holstein-Sonderburg | 1545–1622 | |
| William Heberden | 1710–1801 | English physician | Father of | William Heberden the Younger | 1767–1845 | British physician |
| Henry IV of Brunswick-Lüneburg | 1463–1514 | Duke of Brunswick-Lüneburg and Prince of Wolfenbüttel | Father of | Henry V of Brunswick-Lüneburg | 1489–1568 | Duke of Brunswick-Lüneburg and Prince of Brunswick-Wolfenbüttel |
| Hans Holbein the Elder | c. 1460–1524 | German painter | Father of | Hans Holbein the Younger | c. 1497–1543 | German-Swiss painter and printmaker |
| William Holl the Elder | 1771–1838 | English engraver and political radical | Father of | William Holl the Younger | 1807–1871 | English engraver |
| | | | | John Hotham, the younger | 1610–1645 | English Member of Parliament and Parliamentarian military commander during the First English Civil War; son of Sir John Hotham, 1st Baronet, English Member of Parliament and Governor of Hull |
| Gilbert Ironside the elder | 1588–1671 | English Anglican Bishop of Bristol | Father of | Gilbert Ironside the younger | 1632–1701 | English Anglican Bishop of Bristol and Bishop of Hereford and academic |
| | | | | John the Younger / John, Hereditary Prince of Saxony | 1498–1537 | |
| Old Chief Joseph | c. 1785–1871 | A Native American leader of the Wallowa Band of the Nez Perce | Father of | Chief Joseph | 1840–1904 | A leader of the Nez Perce Native American tribe |
| | | | | John Leverett the Younger | 1662–1724 | Anglo-American lawyer, politician, educator and President of Harvard College; grandson of John Leverett, English colonial magistrate, merchant, soldier and governor of the Massachusetts Bay Colony |
| | | | | Carl Linnaeus the Younger | 1741–1783 | Swedish naturalist; son of Carl Linnaeus, Swedish botanist, zoologist, taxonomist and physician |
| | | | | Louis of Anhalt-Köthen (the Younger) | 1607–1624 | German prince, son of Louis I, Prince of Anhalt-Köthen |
| William Macready the Elder | 1755–1829 | Irish actor-manager, father of English actor William Macready (1793–1873) | | | | |
| | | | | Karel van Mander the Younger | 1579–1623 | Dutch painter, son of Karel van Mander (1548–1606), Flemish painter, playwright, poet, art historian and art theoretician |
| Aldus Manutius | c. 1449/1452–1515 | Italian printer and humanist | Grandfather of | Aldus Manutius the Younger | 1547–1597 | Italian printer and humanist |
| Maria Pavlovna the Elder / Duchess Marie of Mecklenburg-Schwerin | 1854–1920 | Wife of Grand Duke Vladimir Alexandrovich of Russia | | Grand Duchess Maria Pavlovna of Russia | 1890–1958 | |
| Károly Markó the Elder | 1791–1860 | Hungarian painter | Father of | Károly Markó the Younger | 1822–1891 | Hungarian-Italian painter |
| Johann Friedrich Meckel, the Elder | 1724–1774 | German anatomist | Grandfather of | Johann Friedrich Meckel | 1781–1833 | German anatomist |
| Matthäus Merian the Elder | 1593–1650 | Swiss engraver | Father of | Matthäus Merian the Younger | 1621–1687 | Swiss engraver and portrait painter |
| Helmuth von Moltke the Elder | 1800–1891 | Prussian field marshal | Uncle of | Helmuth von Moltke the Younger | 1848–1916 | German general and Chief of the Great German General Staff |
| Grand Duke Nicholas Nikolaevich of Russia | 1831–1891 | Russian field marshal | Father of | Grand Duke Nicholas Nikolaevich of Russia | 1856–1929 | Russian general in World War I |
| Lorens Pasch the Elder | 1702–1766 | Swedish painter | Father of | Lorens Pasch the Younger | 1733–1805 | Swedish painter |
| Antoine Payen the Elder | 1748–1798 | Belgian architect and army engineer | Father of | Antoine Payen the Younger | 1792–1853 | Belgian painter and naturalist |
| | | | | Peter the Younger | 1547–1569 | Voivode (Prince) of Wallachia, called "the Younger" because he was crowned at the age of 13 |
| Pierfrancesco the Elder | 1430–1476 | Italian nobleman, banker, diplomat, and member of the Medici family | Grandfather of | Pierfrancesco the Younger | 1487–1525 | Italian banker |
| William Pitt, 1st Earl of Chatham | 1708–1778 | Prime Minister of Great Britain | Father of | William Pitt the Younger | 1759–1806 | Youngest and last prime minister of Great Britain and first prime minister of the United Kingdom |
| | | | | Nicolas de Poilly the Younger | 1675–1747 | French painter and engraver, son of Nicolas de Poilly the Elder (1626–1696), an engraver |
| Diego Polo the Elder | 1560–1600 | Spanish painter | Uncle of | Diego Polo the Younger | 1620–1655 | Spanish painter |
| Ercole Procaccini the Elder | 1520–1595 | Italian painter | Grandfather of | Ercole Procaccini the Younger | 1605–1675 or 1680 | Italian painter |
| Giulio Quaglio the Elder | 1610–1658 or later | Italian painter | Father of | Giulio Quaglio the Younger | 1668–1751 | Italian Baroque painter |
| Artus Quellinus the Elder | 1609–1668 | Flemish sculptor | Cousin of | Artus Quellinus II | 1625–1700 | Flemish sculptor |
| Erasmus Quellinus the Elder | 1584–1640 | Flemish sculptor | Father of | Erasmus Quellinus the Younger | 1607–1678 | Flemish painter |
| Murat Reis the Elder | c. 1534–1609 | Ottoman privateer and admiral | | Jan Janszoon, commonly known as Murat Reis the Younger | c. 1570–c. 1641 | Dutch pirate and convert to Islam after being captured by Moors, first president and commander of the Republic of Salé city state |
| John Rennie the Elder | 1761–1821 | Scottish civil engineer | Father of | John Rennie the Younger | 1794–1874 | English engineer |
| Olaus Rudbeck | 1630–1702 | Swedish scientist, writer and professor of medicine | Father of | Olof Rudbeck the Younger | 1660–1740 | Swedish explorer, scientist, botanist and ornithologist |
| Antonio da Sangallo the Elder | c. 1453–1534 | Italian architect | Uncle of | Antonio da Sangallo the Younger | 1484–1546 | Italian architect |
| Jan Kazimierz Sapieha | died 1703 | A grand hetman of Lithuania | Relative of | Jan Kazimierz Sapieha the Younger | 1637–1720 | A grand hetman of Lithuania and Voivode of Vilnius |
| Martin Schalling the Elder | died 1552 | Protestant theologian and reformer | Father of | Martin Schalling the Younger | 1532–1608 | Protestant theologian, reformer and hymnwriter |
| | | | | George Murray Smith the Younger | 1859–1919 | Chairman of the Midland Railway; son of the publisher George Smith |
| Johann Strauss I | 1804–1849 | Austrian composer | Father of | Johann Strauss II | 1825–1899 | Austrian composer of light music, particularly waltzes |
| Edward Strong the Elder | 1652–1724 | British sculptor | Father of | Edward Strong the Younger | 1676–1741 | British sculptor |
| Sten Sture the Elder | 1440–1503 | Regent of Sweden | Distant relative of | Sten Sture the Younger | 1493–1520 | Swedish nobleman, regent of Sweden |
| | | | | Adrien Taunay the Younger | 1803–1828 | French painter and draftsman |
| David Teniers the Elder | 1582–1649 | Flemish painter | Father of | David Teniers the Younger | 1610–1690 | Flemish painter, printmaker, draughtsman, copyist and art curator |
| William Theed the elder | 1764–1817 | English sculptor and painter | Father of | William Theed | 1804–1891 | British sculptor |
| John Tradescant the Elder | c. 1570s–1638 | English naturalist, gardener, collector and traveler | Father of | John Tradescant the Younger | 1608–1662 | English botanist and gardener |
| Ulrika Eleonora of Denmark | 1656–1693 | Queen of Sweden | Mother of | Ulrika Eleonora of Sweden | 1688–1741 | Queen of Sweden |
| Henry Vane the Elder | 1589–1655 | English politician, Secretary of State | Father of | Henry Vane the Younger | 1613–1662 | English politician and colonial governor |
| Willem van de Velde the Elder | 1610/11–1693 | Dutch seascape painter | Father of | Willem van de Velde the Younger | 1633–1707 | Dutch marine painter |
| Pieter Verbrugghen I | 1615–1686 | Flemish sculptor | Father of | Pieter Verbrugghen the Younger | 1648–after 1691 | Flemish sculptor, draughtsman, etcher and stone merchant |
| Pier Paolo Vergerio the Elder | 1370–1444/5 | Italian humanist, statesman, pedagogist and canon lawyer | | Pier Paolo Vergerio | c. 1498–1565 | Italian papal nuncio and later Protestant reformer |
| Thomas Warton the elder | c. 1688–1745 | English clergyman, schoolmaster and second professor of poetry at Oxford | Father of | Thomas Warton | 1728–1790 | English literary historian, critic and poet |
| William I, Count of Nassau-Siegen | 1487–1559 | Father of Prince William the Silent/William of Orange (1533–1584), leader of the Dutch revolt against the Spanish Habsburgs | | | | |
| William I, Landgrave of Lower Hesse | 1466–1515 | Elder brother of William II, Landgrave of Hesse (1469–1509), also known as "William the Middle" | Uncle of | William III, Landgrave of Hesse | 1471–1500 | |
| John Winthrop | 1587/88–1649 | English Puritan lawyer and one of the leading figures in founding the Massachusetts Bay Colony | Father of | John Winthrop the Younger | 1606–1676 | An early governor of the Connecticut Colony |
| | | | | William the Younger, Duke of Brunswick | 1535–1592 | Also co-ruler of the Principality of Lüneburg |
| John Wood, the Elder | 1704–1754 | English architect | Father of | John Wood, the Younger | 1728–1782 | English architect |
| | | | | Christopher Wren the Younger | 1675–1747 | English Member of Parliament; son of the architect Christopher Wren |
| | | | | Thomas Wyatt the Younger | 1521–1554 | English politician and leader of Wyatt's rebellion; son of the English poet Thomas Wyatt |
| Paolo Zacchia the Elder | 1490–1561 | Italian painter, father of Lorenzo di Ferro Zacchia | | | | |

== Religious and mythical figures ==
| The Elder | Notes | Relationship | The Younger | Notes |
|---|---|---|---|---|
| Alma the Elder | Prophet in the Book of Mormon | Father of | Alma the Younger | Prophet in the Book of Mormon |
| Bors the Elder | King of Gaunnes in Arthurian legend | Father of | Bors the Younger | One of King Arthur's Knights of the Round Table |
| Horus the Elder | Ancient Egyptian god | | Horus the Younger | Ancient Egyptian god |
| James the Great | One of Jesus' Twelve Apostles | Fellow Apostles | James, son of Alphaeus | One of Jesus' Twelve Apostles, generally identified with James the Less |
| James the Great | One of Jesus' Twelve Apostles | Fellow Apostles | James the Less | Identified by some as James, son of Alphaeus, by others as James, brother of Jesus |

== Fictional characters ==
| The Elder | Notes | Relationship | The Younger | Notes |
|---|---|---|---|---|
| | | | David Copperfield | Son of David Copperfield Sr. in the Charles Dickens novel whose full title is The Personal History Experience and Observation of David Copperfield the Younger of Blunderstone Rookery which he never meant to be published on any account |
| Aegon II "the Elder" | King of Westeros | Uncle of | Aegon III "the younger" | King of Westeros, son of Queen Rhaenyra Targaryen (half-sister of King Aegon II) |

== See also ==
- List of people known as the Old
- List of people known as the Young
