= George Cuitt =

George Cuitt may refer to:

- George Cuitt the Elder (1743–1818), English painter
- George Cuitt the Younger (1779–1854), his son, English painter
