= Nicholas Bourbon =

Nicholas Bourbon may refer to:

- Nicholas Bourbon (the elder) (1503–1550), French neo-Latin poet; granduncle of "the younger"
- Nicholas Bourbon (the younger) (1574–1644), French neo-Latin poet; member of the Académie française
