= Lament over the Dead Christ (Moretto) =

Painting by Moretto da Brescia

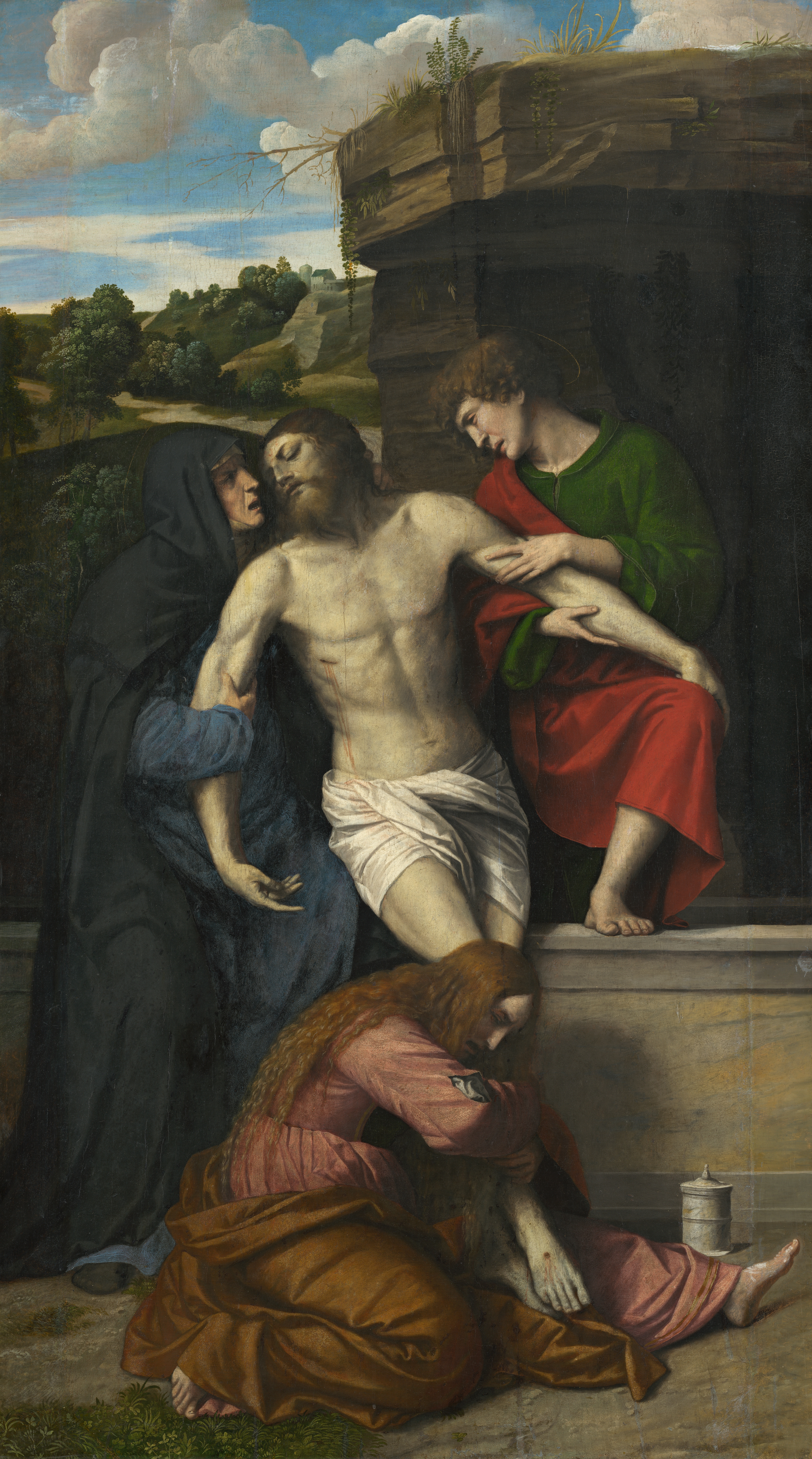
- Artist: Moretto da Brescia
- Year: 1526-1530
- Medium: Oil on canvas
- Location: National Gallery of Art, Washington, D.C.

Lament over the Dead Christ is a 1526–1530 oil on canvas painting by Moretto da Brescia, now in the National Gallery of Art in Washington. Painted late in the painter's youth, it shows strong similarities to the central panel of Paolo Caylina the Younger's Deposition Altarpiece from around the same time, though there are also notable differences in their use of color, such as the brighter and clearer colors used by Moretto. Some of the elements reused by Moretto in Lament recurred later in his career, so the work gives a clear idea of Moretto's training and education as an artist.

== History ==
No records survive of the painting's commissioning and original location. It is first recorded in the 19th century, when it was in the collection of George Wyndham, 4th Earl of Egremont. It was then acquired at an unknown date for the Cook collection in Richmond-upon-Thames, which also contained Moretto's Enthroned Madonna and Child with Saint James the Great and Saint Jerome. In 1898, Pietro Da Ponte wrote of it, attributing it to Cesare Magni, though he does not cite his source for this attribution. In 1947, it was sold to the Kress Collection, which had become part of the National Gallery of Art in Washington, D.C. in 1939.

== Description ==
The work depicts Jesus, dead after crucifixion, and the desperation of Mary Magdalene at his feet, Mary at left, and John the Apostle at right. John supports one foot on an open tomb, into which the Jesus' body is being placed. The background of scene opens into a hilly, overgrown landscape that is obscured by a rock wall to the right of Saint John. The sky is filled with a few vaporous clouds and opens up around the horizon

== Style ==
Pietro da Ponte, one of the first art historians to study the work, called it "a canvas notable for the great expression of melancholy in its figures". In 1913, Tancred Borenius correctly dated it to the painter's youth, made the link to the Deposition Altarpiece and noted the strong similarities between its figure of Mary Magdalene and the woman at Jesus' feet in Moretto's much later Supper in the House of Simon the Pharisee (1550). Borenius also compared the Lament to the Deposition Altarpiece, attributed to Paolo Caylina the Younger and likely completed around the same time.

The question of "who copied who" remained unanswered for a long time and was only resolved in 1965. Gaetano Panazzo, after the Deposition Altarpiece was restored, was able to compare the works' technique and palette. From his study, the work of Caylina used effects of color and light that "had great weight for Moretto, not only as a youth. Panazzo observed that "there is even visible a sweetness, a dull calm in the emotions, glances, and rhythms".

Camillo Boselli, who analyzed Lament in 1954, emphasize its use of almost modern lighting techniques—clearer than that of the Deposition Altarpiece in a way that reinforces the tragedy of the scene. He noted how the figures "cling" to the body of Christ, while they turn to create a heightened, dynamic sense of drama.

There are at least 3 extant copies of Lament. Two are in private Italian collections and one is in the parish church of San Giovanni Battista in Coccaglio, Brescia.

== Bibliography ==
- Tancred Borenius, The Venetian School in the Grand-Ducal Collection – Oldenburg, in "The Burlington Magazine", numero 23, Londra 1913
- (in Italian) Camillo Boselli, Il Moretto, 1498–1554, in "Commentari dell'Ateneo di Brescia per l'anno 1954 – Supplemento", Brescia 1954
- (in Italian) Pietro Da Ponte, L'opera del Moretto, Brescia 1898
- (in Italian) Gateano Panazza, Mostra di Girolamo Romanino, exhibition catalogue, Brescia 1965
- (in Italian) Pier Virgilio Begni Redona, Alessandro Bonvicino – Il Moretto da Brescia, Editrice La Scuola, Brescia 1988
