= John Brinsley =

John Brinsley may refer to:

- John Brinsley the elder (fl. 1581–1624), English schoolmaster
- John Brinsley the younger (1600–1665), English minister, son of John Brinsley the elder
