= John the Elder (disambiguation) =

John the Elder is another nickname for John the Presbyter, an obscure figure of the early Catholic Church.

John the Elder may also refer to:

- John Bramston the Elder (1577–1654), English judge and Chief Justice of the King's Bench
- John Cleveley the Elder (c. 1712–1777), English painter who specialised in marine art
- John Brinsley the Elder (fl. 1581–1624), English schoolmaster
- John Eddowes Bowman the Elder (1785–1841), British banker and naturalist
- John Faber the Elder (c. 1660–1721), Dutch miniaturist and portrait engraver active
- John Tradescant the Elder (c. 1570s–1638), English naturalist, gardener, and collector
- John the Elder, Duke of Schleswig-Holstein-Haderslev (1521–1580)
- John Wood, the Elder (1704–1754), English architect
