= Zacchia =

Zacchia is an Italian surname. Notable people with the surname include:

- Paolo Zacchia the Elder (1490–1561), Italian Renaissance painter
- Laudivio Zacchia (1565–1637), Italian cardinal
- Nicolle Zacchia (born 2010), Brazilian rhythmic gymnast
- Paul Zacchias or Paolo Zacchia (1584–1659), Italian physician, teacher of medical science and forensic medicine, medico-legal jurist, philosopher, poet
- Steve Zacchia (born 1982), Swiss racing driver
