= Ferdinand Elle =

Flemish portrait painter (1570–1637)

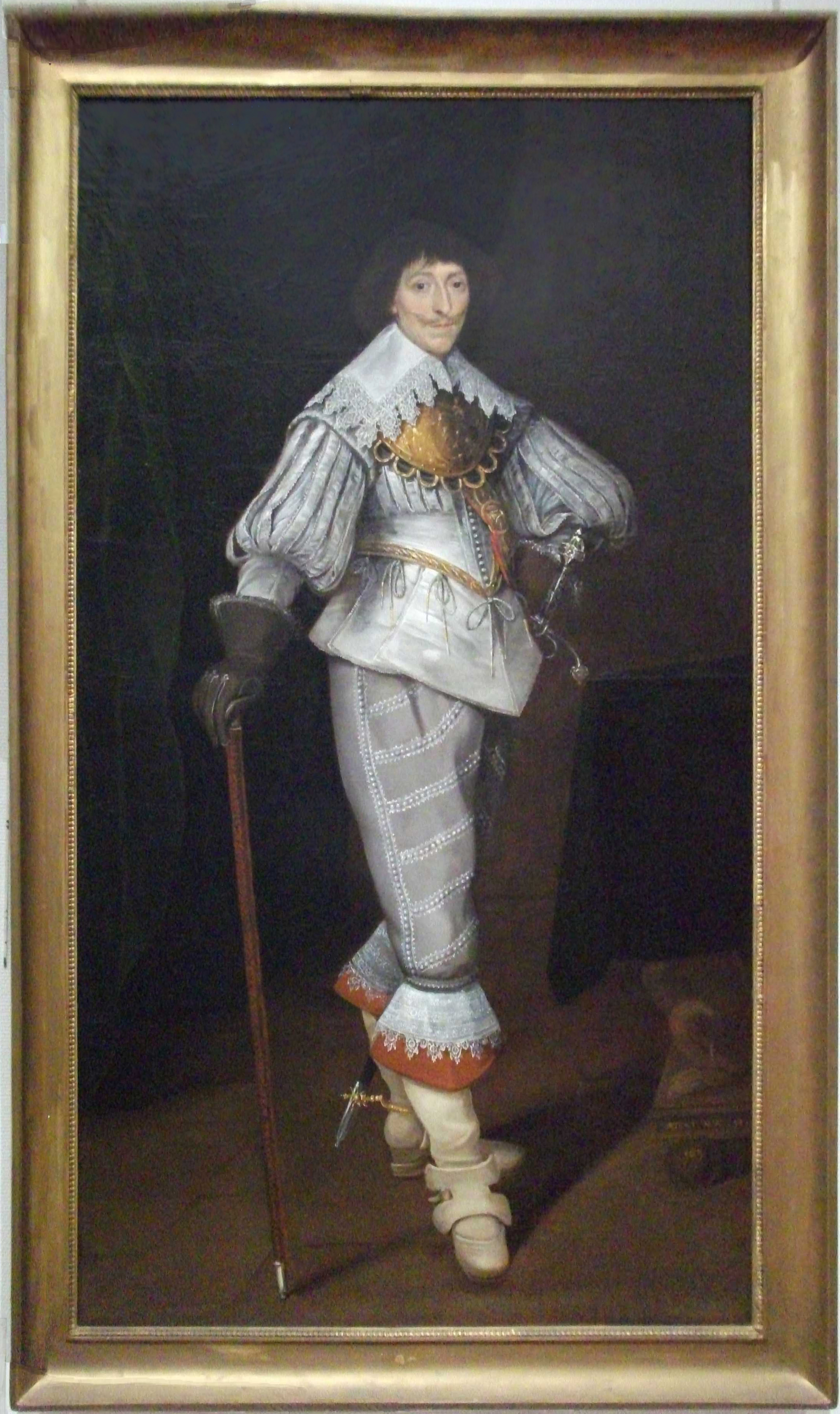
Henri de Lorraine, marquis de Mouy.

Ferdinand Elle (1570 in Mechelen – 1637 in Paris) was a Flemish portrait painter.

== Biography ==
According to the RKD he was the teacher of Nicolas Poussin and his son, the painter Louis Ferdinand Elle the Elder. From 1601 he was court painter to Louis XIII. Very few of his works survive.
