= Bartolomeo Caylina =

Italian painter

Bartolomeo Caylina was a 15th-century Italian painter active mainly in Lombardy in an early-Renaissance style.

== Biography ==
He was born in Brescia and was the father of Paolo Caylina the Younger. He is said to be the brother in law of Vincenzo Foppa. Some sources suspect he may be the Bartolomeo da Prato, known as the Bresciano, or at least confused for the same. That Bartolomeo is attributed as working during 1468 with Foppa in the Capella Portinari located inside the church of Sant'Eustorgio in Milan. He is also said to have painted frescoes for the Cascina di Mirabello in 1470.

In 1465, he painted frescoes for the Certosa of Pavia along with the Pavian painter Bertolino della Canonica.
