= List of people known as the Old =

The Old is an epithet that may refer to:

== People ==
- Basarab the Old (died 1480), Prince of Wallachia
- Emund the Old (died 1060), King of Sweden
- Gorm the Old (died 958), first historically recognized king of Denmark
- Haakon IV (1204–1263), King of Norway
- Mieszko III of Poland (c. 1126/27–1202), Duke of Greater Poland and High Duke of Poland
- Miro the Elder (died 896), Count of Conflent and of Rosselló
- Ramon Berenguer I, Count of Barcelona (1023–1076)
- Sigismund I the Old (1467–1548), King of Poland, Grand Duke of Lithuania and Duke of Silesia
- William the Old (died 1168), Bishop of Orkney
- William V, Marquis of Montferrat (c. 1115–1191)

== Mythological figures ==
- Aun, Swedish king
- Halfdan the Old, in Norse mythology
- Harald the Old, King of Scania
- Hefeydd, father of Rhiannon in Welsh mythology
- Raum the Old, a king in Norway

== Fictional characters ==
- Bëor, a man in J. R. R. Tolkien's Middle-earth
- Thráin the Old, a dwarf in J. R. R. Tolkien's Middle-earth

== See also ==
- List of people known as the Young
- List of people known as the Elder or the Younger
