= List of people known as the Young =

The epithet the Young may refer to:

== People ==
- Basarab the Young (before 1444?–1482), Prince of Wallachia
- Haakon the Young (1232–1257), a junior king of Norway
- Harald Eiriksson, joint Earl of Orkney in the 12th century
- Ivan the Young (1458–1490), heir to the principality of Muscovy
- Valdemar the Young (c. 1209–1231), King of Denmark

== Mythological and fictional persons ==
- Aengus, a god in Irish mythology
- Eorl the Young, first King of Rohan in Tolkien's Middle-earth

== See also ==
- List of people known as the Elder or the Younger
- List of people known as the Old
- Henry the Young King (1155–1183), King of England, Duke of Normandy and Count of Anjou and Maine
