= Louis Ferdinand Elle the Elder =

French portrait painter (1612–1689)

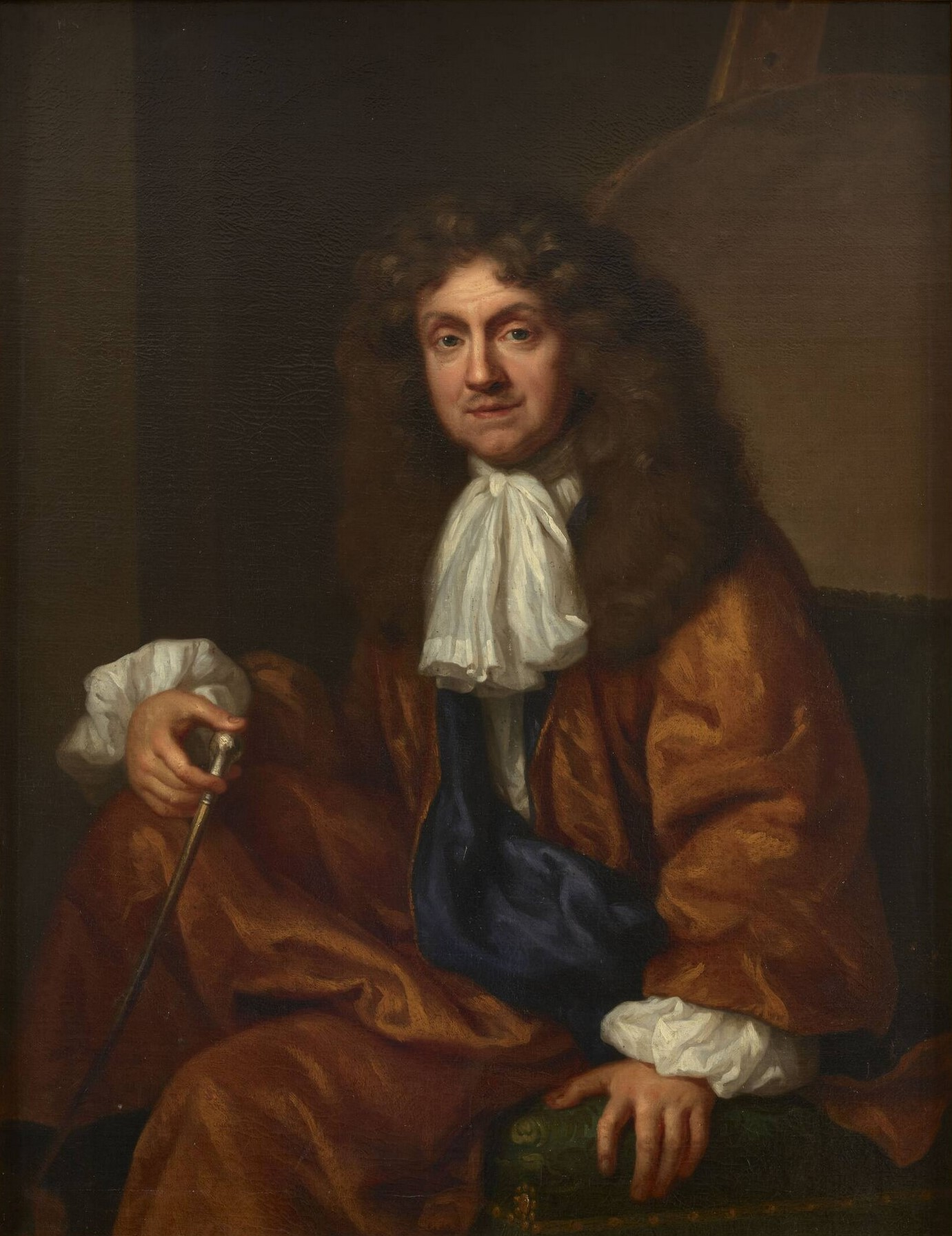
Portrait by Henri Gascar, 1680

Louis Ferdinand Elle the Elder (19 July 1612 – 12 December 1689) was a French portrait painter. He was the son of Ferdinand Elle.

== Biography ==
Elle was born and died in Paris. According to the RKD he was one of the 12 men who were dissatisfied with the Paris Guild of St. Luke and who founded the Académie de peinture et de sculpture in 1648. His portraits were influenced by Anthony van Dyck and Charles Errard, among others. He became the teacher of his son, Louis Ferdinand Elle the Younger.

== Works ==
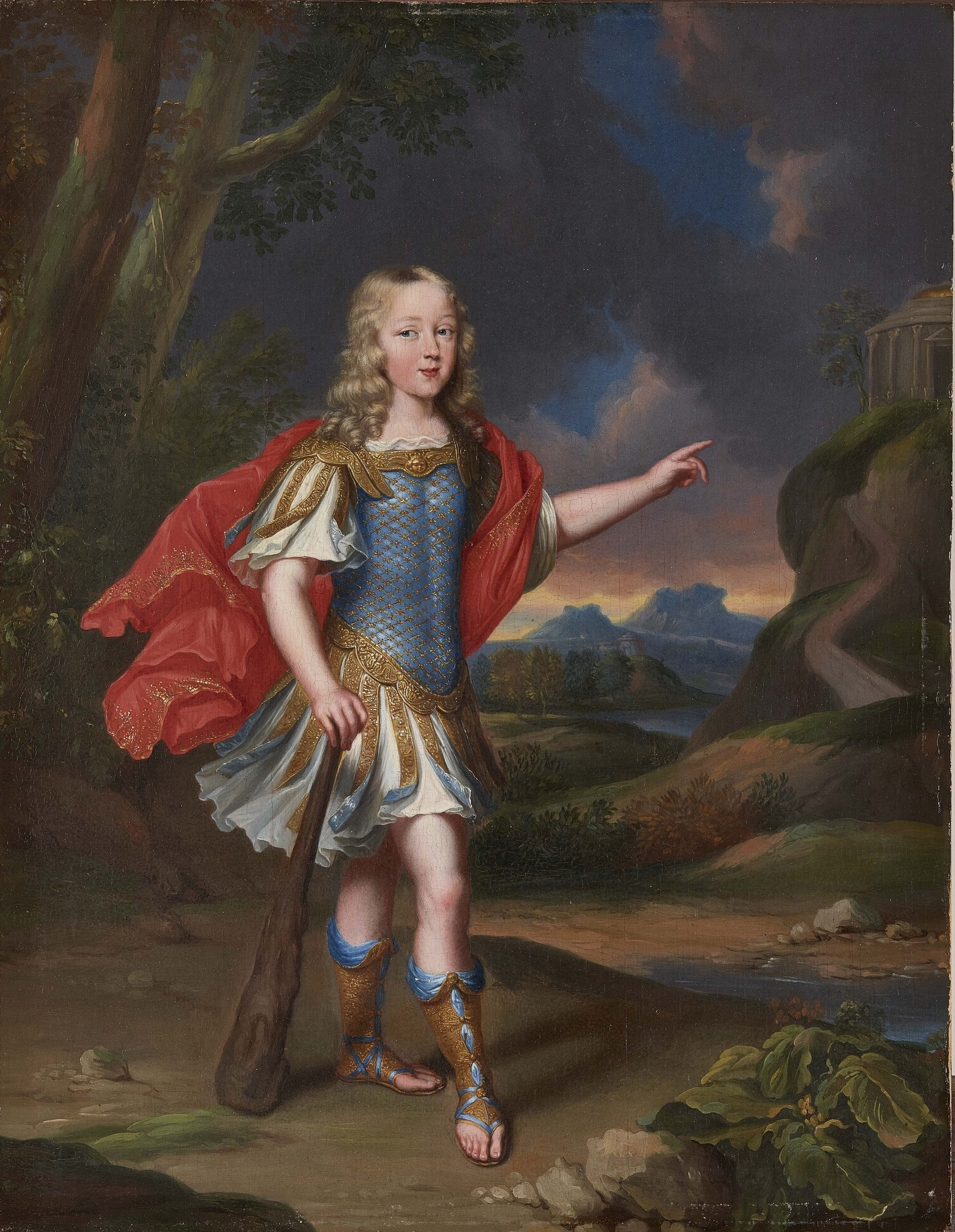
Charles Paris d'Orléans (1658-1660)

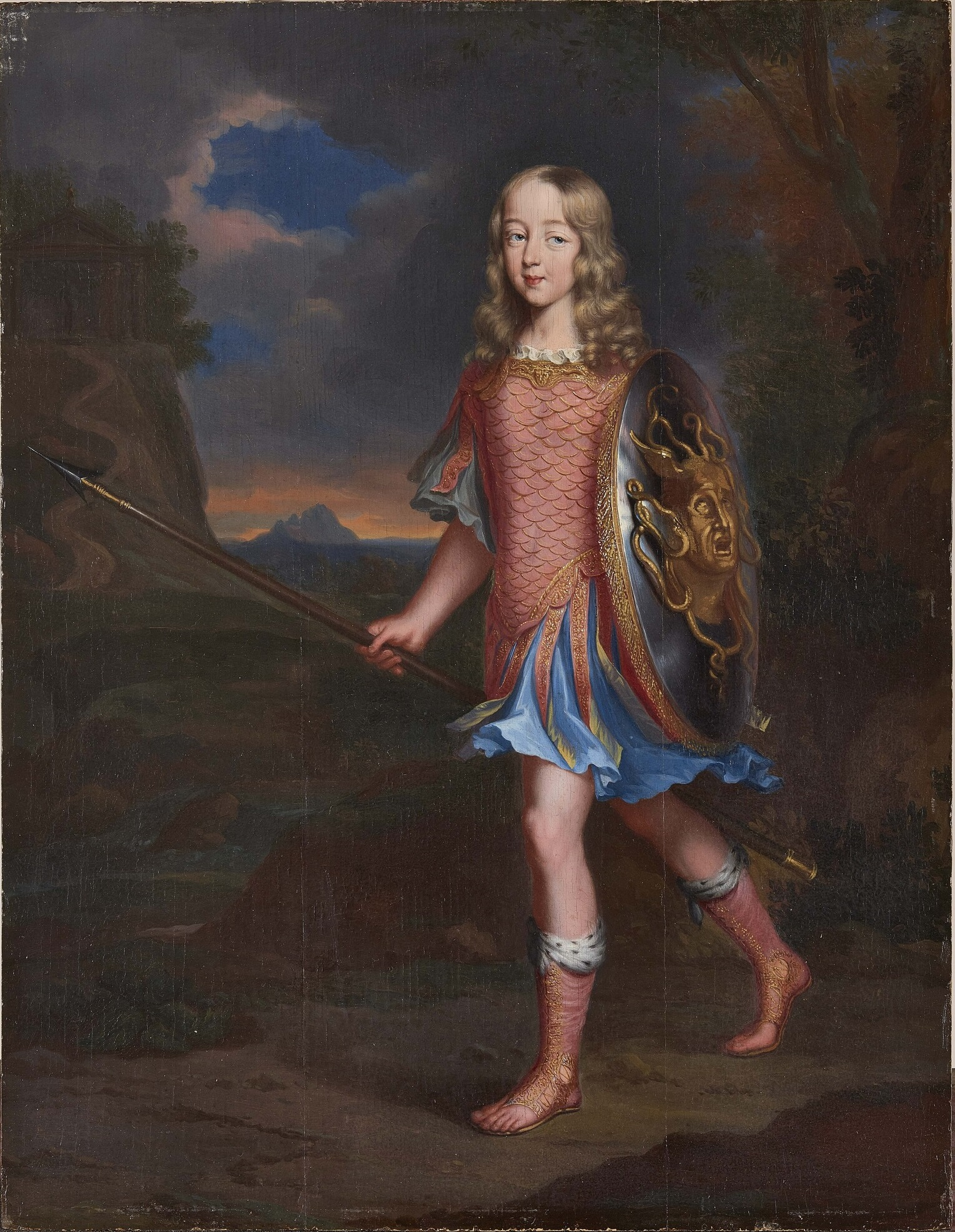
Jean Louis Charles d'Orléans (1660)

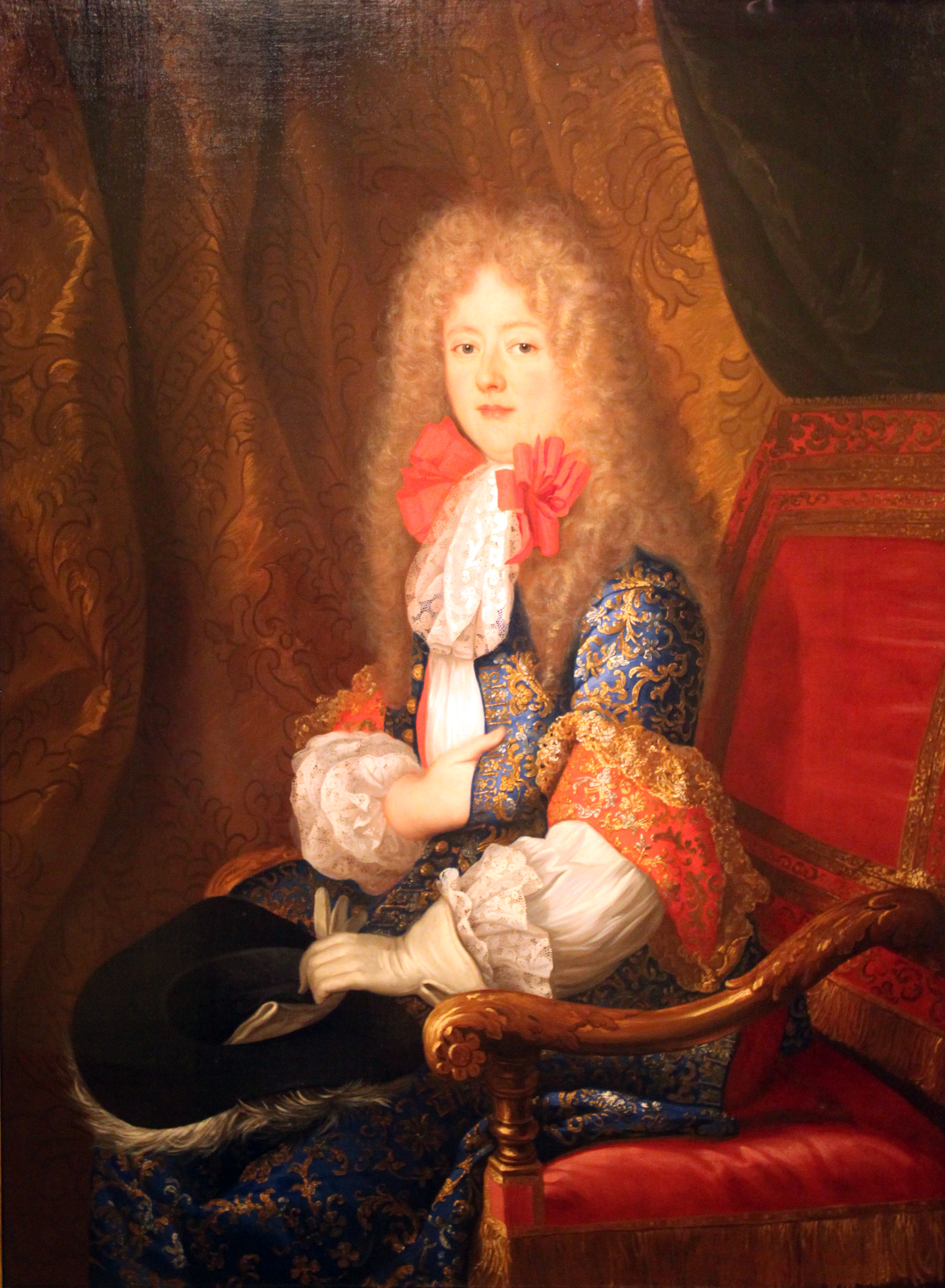
Madame, Duchess of Orléans (Elisabeth Charlotte of the Palatinate) in hunting dress (1673)

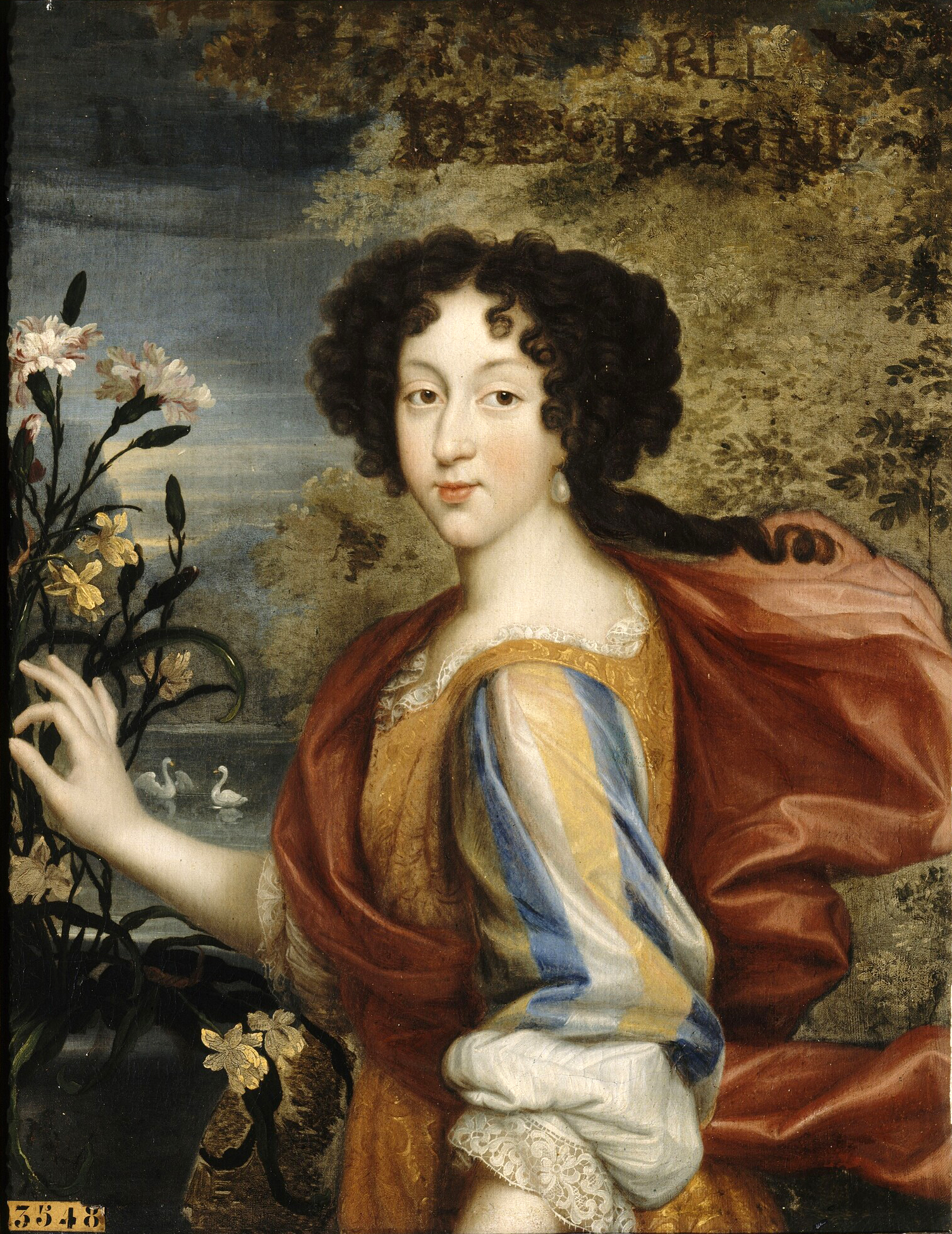
Marie Louise of Orléans (circa 1679)

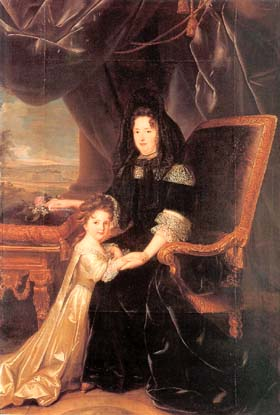
Marquise de Maintenon with her niece Françoise Charlotte d'Aubigné (1688)

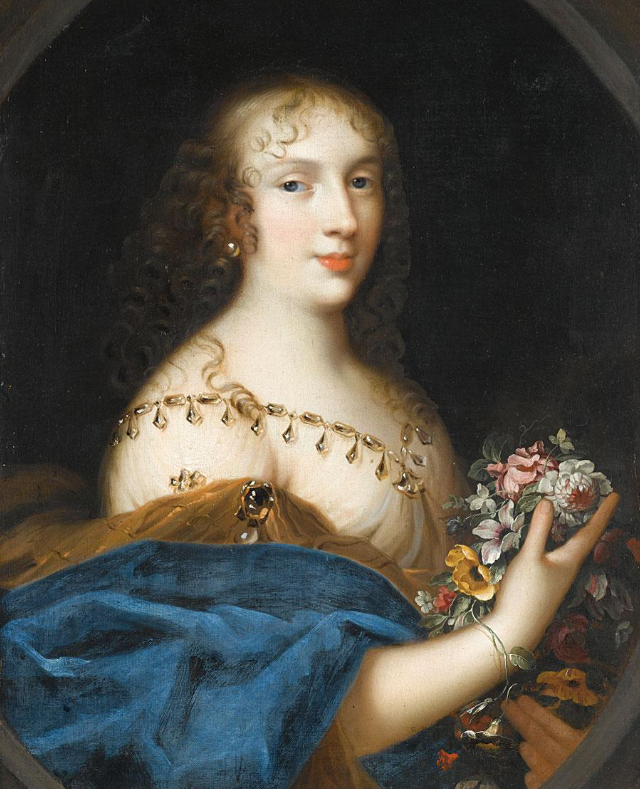
Duchess of Montpensier

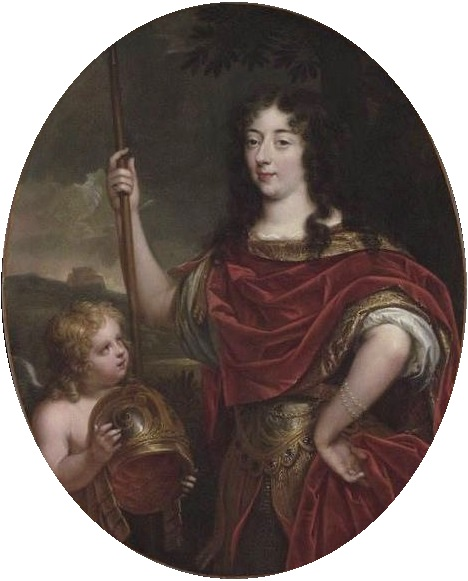
La Grande Mademoiselle
