= Nicholas Bourbon (the elder) =

16th century French poet

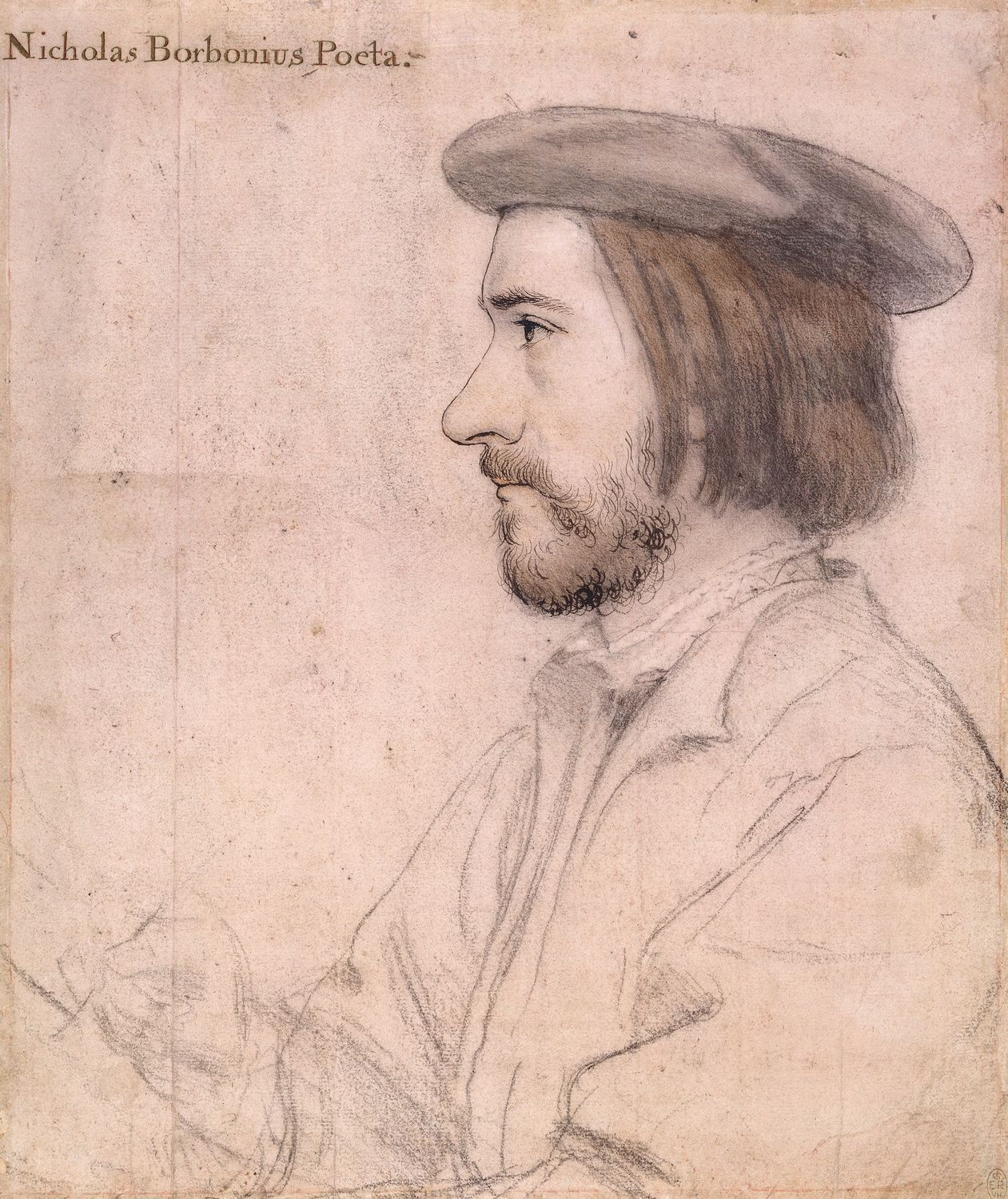
Portrait by Hans Holbein the Younger, 1535

Nicholas Bourbon (French pronunciation: [nikɔla buʁbɔ̃]; 1503 – after 1550) was a French court preceptor and poet. He wrote a collection of poems called Nugae (Latin for 'trifles'), known as the Bagatelles in French. He is the great-uncle of Nicholas Bourbon (1574–1644), a member of the Académie française.

Bourbon was born in Vendeuvre-sur-Barse, France. He went to England in 1535 to pay homage to Henry VIII of England and his second Queen Consort, Anne Boleyn, in gratitude for their help while under persecution in France. He later wrote a series of poems in which Anne Boleyn is described as one of God's beloved servants.

Nugae was the subject of an epigram by John Owen.

== Life and works ==
Bourbon began writing Latin poetry at a young age. In an early poem titled De Ferraria, Bourbon wrote about his origins and his native city of Vandeuvre, known in the 15th century for cannonball forges. He also served as a précepteur for many important families, including the Cardinal of Tournon. He taught humanities in Amiens, Langres, and Troyes. His first poems were published in 1529 in a collection called Vandoperani, campani, epigrammata, which contained a mixture of epigrams, canticles, dialogues, and epistles. He followed up this initial work in 1533 with the first edition of Nugae (Bagatelles), for which he incurred the wrath of religious authorities. In particular, in the epigram In lauduem Dei optimi maximi, Bourbon seemingly showed himself favorable to religious reform. It is also claimed that this work contains subtle criticisms of Noël Béda, a noted theologian and ideological opponent of humanist thinkers. As a result of this work, Bourbon was imprisoned for several years. Despite many appeals to his various protectors, a royal commandment to "take Borbonius out of prison," and a petition to Cardinal Jean de Lorraine, Bourbon would remain imprisoned until released by Francis I in 1535.

Bourbon subsequently left for England, where he benefited from the protection of Anne Boleyn, the former lady-in-waiting to Claude of France and the second wife of Henry VIII. She was a proponent of moderate evangelical reform and helped Bourbon find work as a tutor. One of Bourbon's entourages in England was Hans Holbein the Younger, who was making his second stay at the Court of England. Holbein would draw Bourbon's portrait in 1535. Bourbon, who greatly admired Holbein, named him "the Apelles of our time."

Bourbon returned to France in 1536 and settled in Lyon, where he became a regular in the group of poets and humanists loyal to Étienne Dolet, known as the "école lyonnaise" (the Lyonnaise School.") Other members of this group included Jean Visagier, Eustorg de Beaulieu, Gilbert Ducher, and Symphorien Champier. Bourbon met François Rabelais, who the religious authorities had also targeted for Pantagruel. In 1538, Bourbon released a second edition of Nugae, containing many new pieces but with fewer controversial epistles. Around 1540, he took on the role of précepteur for Jeanne d'Albret, daughter of Marguerite de Navarre. He likely encountered other notable poets in service to the Queen, especially Clément Marot, who, in the introductory texts of Adolescence clémentine, included an epigram titled "Bourbon, dit Borbonius, poète lyonnais" ("Bourbon, called Borbonius, Lyonnais poet.")
