= Diego Polo the Elder =

Spanish painter

Diego Polo the Elder (1560–1600) was a Spanish painter of the Renaissance period. He was born in Burgos, but studied at Madrid, under Patricio Caxes, and practised history. There are some of his works in el Escorial, and in the palace at Madrid, in which city he died. He painted a series of imagined portraits of the Visigothic kings and a St. Jerome chastised by an Angel for taking too much pleasure in reading Cicero, and a Penitent Magdalene.

Polo's nephew, Diego Polo the Younger, was also a painter.
