= Louis Ferdinand Elle the Younger =

French painter

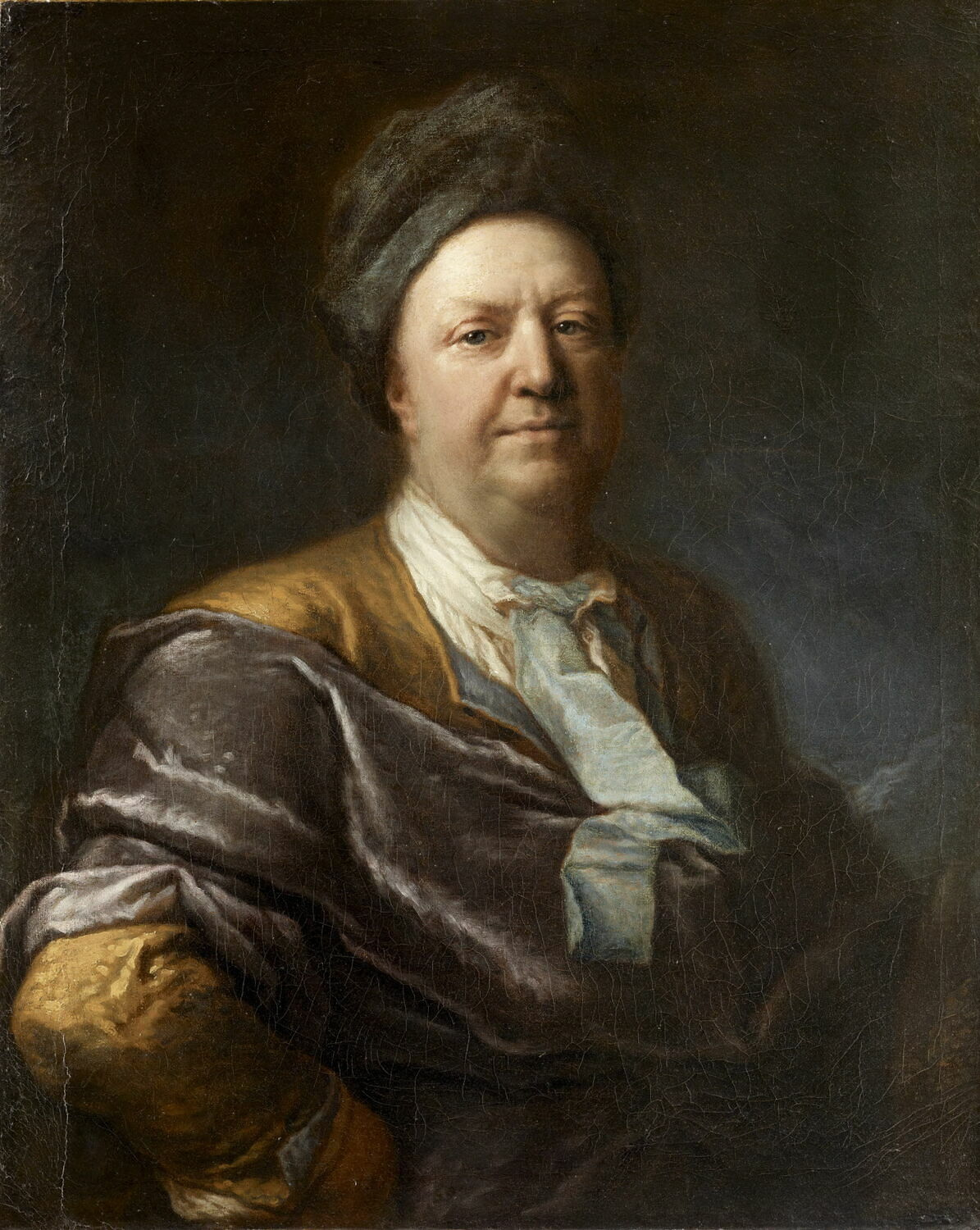
Self-portrait c. 1700

Louis Ferdinand Elle the Younger (1648–1717) was a French portrait painter and the son of Louis Ferdinand Elle the Elder.

== Biography ==
He was born and died in Paris. According to the RKD he was educated at the Académie de peinture et de sculpture, and moved after 1686 to the provinces, namely Nantes and later to Rennes. This was possibly due to the competition in portrait painting in Paris by the artists Nicolas de Largillière, Hyacinthe Rigaud, and François de Troy during his period of activity there.
