= Ulrich Fugger the Younger =

German merchant and businessman

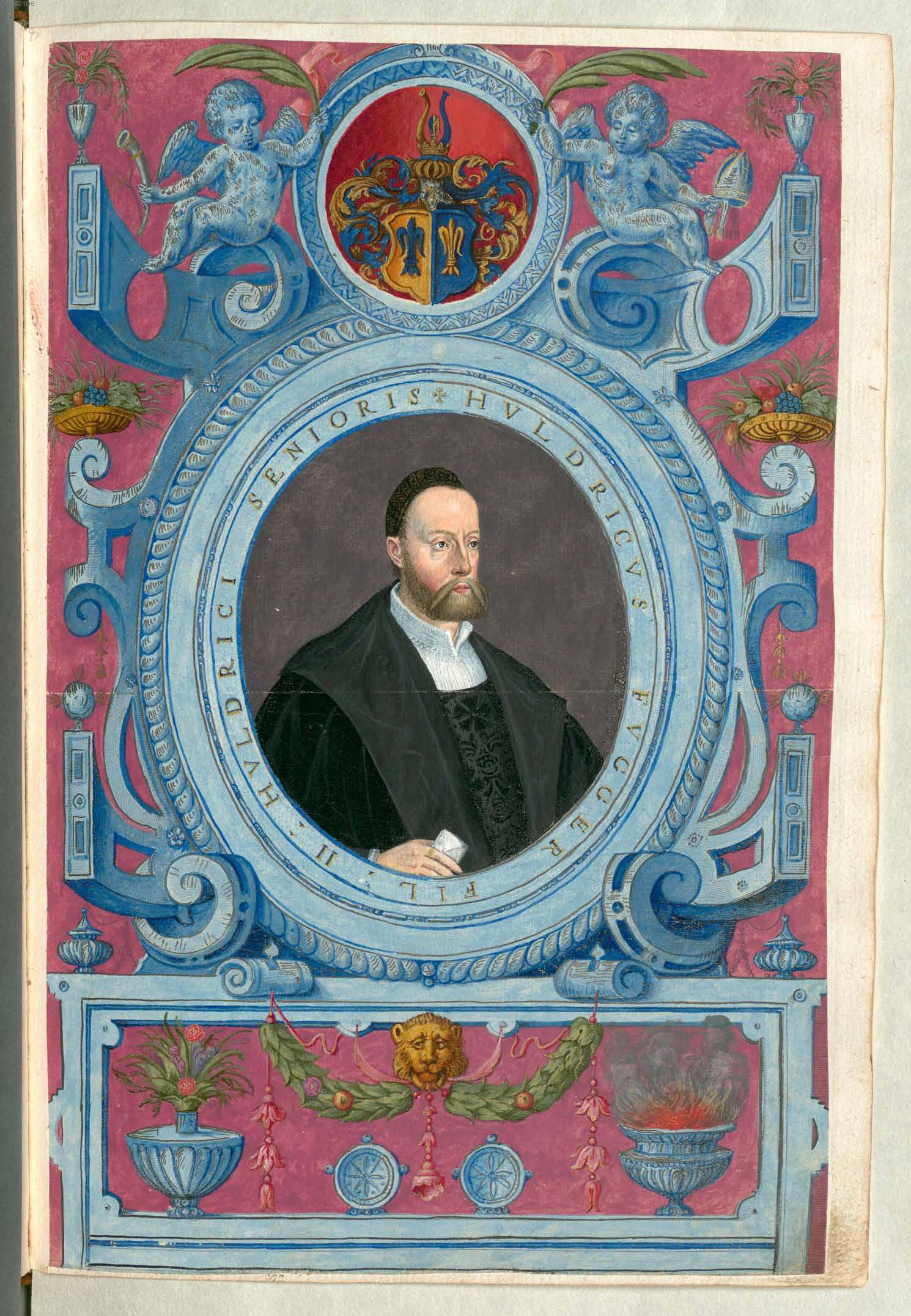
Ulrich Fugger the Younger - coloured copperplate from Fuggerorum et Fuggerarum imagines, 1618.

Ulrich Fugger the Younger (1490–1525; von der Lilie) was a German merchant and businessman from the Fugger family. Active in Augsburg, he was the second-eldest son of Ulrich Fugger the Elder and Veronika Lauginger. In 1516, he married Veronika Gassner. He was a successful businessman and his uncle Jakob Fugger planned that he would be his successor at the head of the family firm, though Ulrich the Younger died before this could happen, so Jakob's eventual successor was another nephew, Anton Fugger.
