= Madonna and Child with Saints James the Great and Jerome (Romanino) =

Painting by Girolamo Romanino

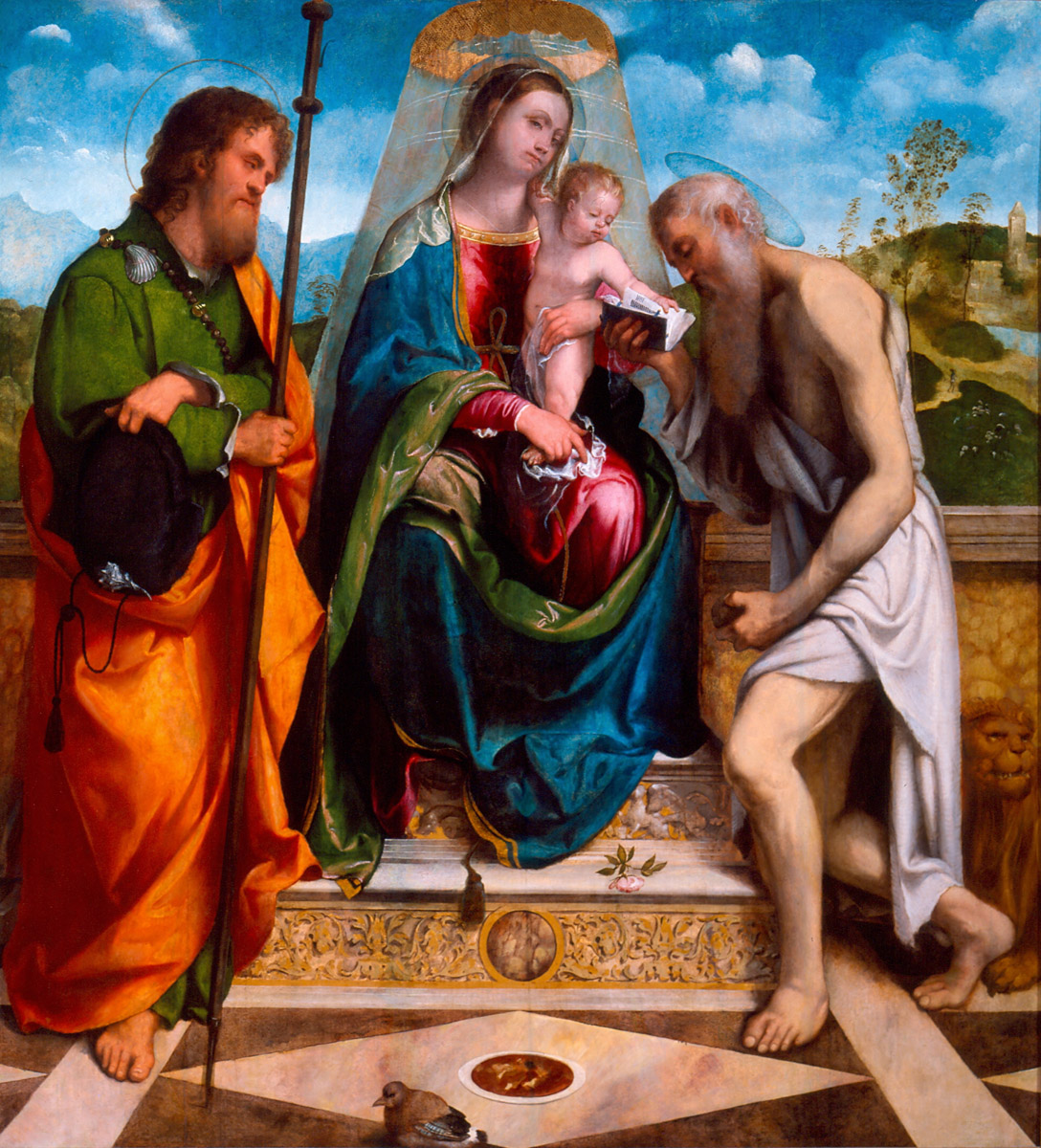
- Artist: Romanino
- Year: c. 1512
- Medium: Oil on panel
- Location: High Museum of Art, Atlanta

Madonna and Child with Saints James the Great and Jerome is an oil painting on canvas of c. 1512 by Romanino, now in the High Museum of Art in Atlanta, which acquired it in 1950.

It is first recorded in 1824 and 1837 catalogs of the collection of Count Teodoro Lechi of Brescia; he acquired it sometime after 1814, since it does not appear in another catalog of his collection made that year. It was sold in London in 1845 and later appeared in the Cook collection in Richmond-upon-Thames.
