= Diego Polo the Younger =

Spanish painter

Diego Polo the Younger (1620–1655) was a Spanish painter of the Baroque period. He was the nephew of the elder Diego Polo. He was born in Burgos. He was a scholar of Antonio Lanchares.

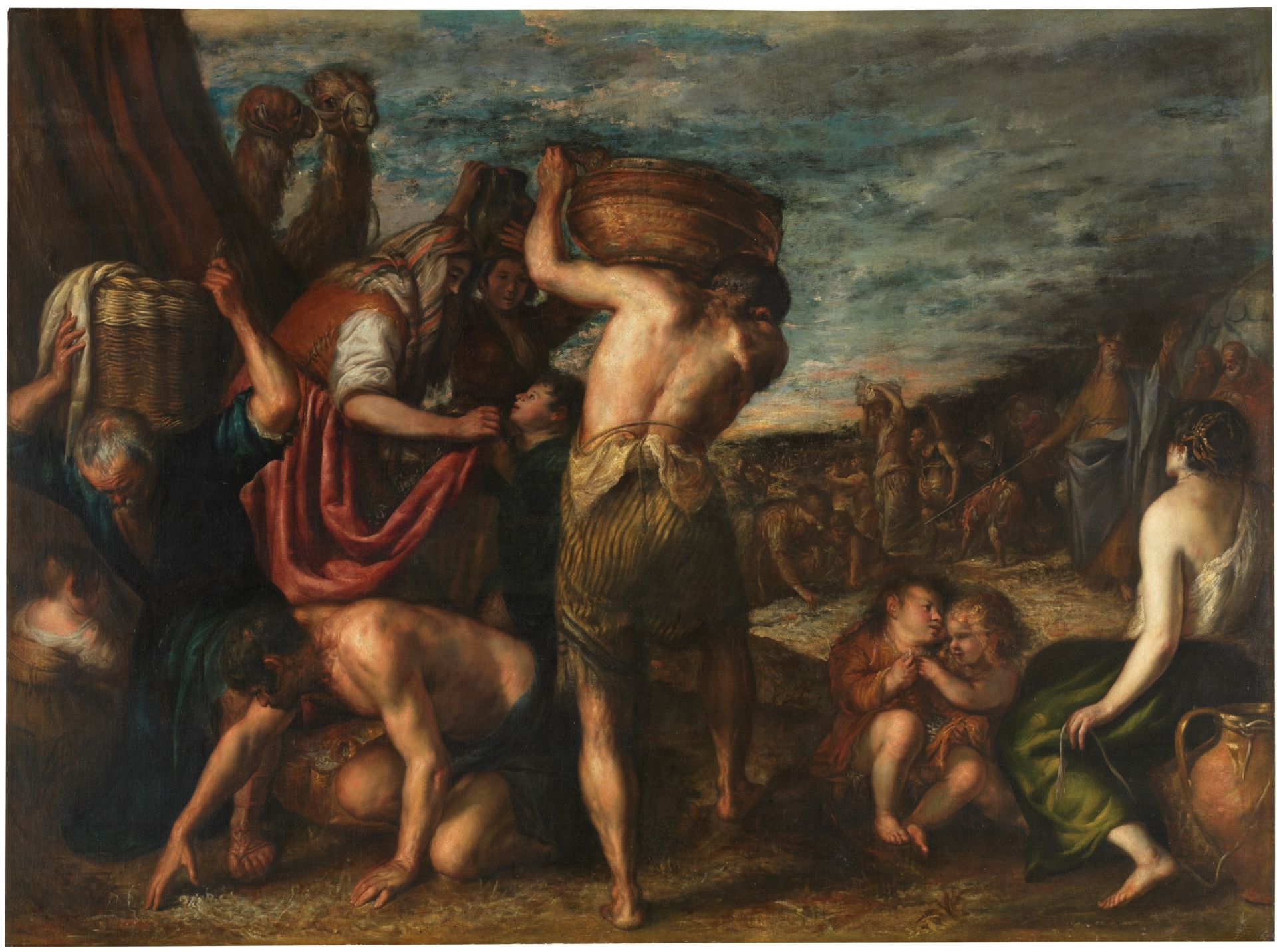
Diego Polo, The Gathering of Manna.

He painted several pictures for the churches at Madrid, among them the Baptism of Christ for the church of the Carmelites and an Annunciation for the church of Santa Maria. He also excelled in portraiture.
