= George Cuitt the Younger =

English painter

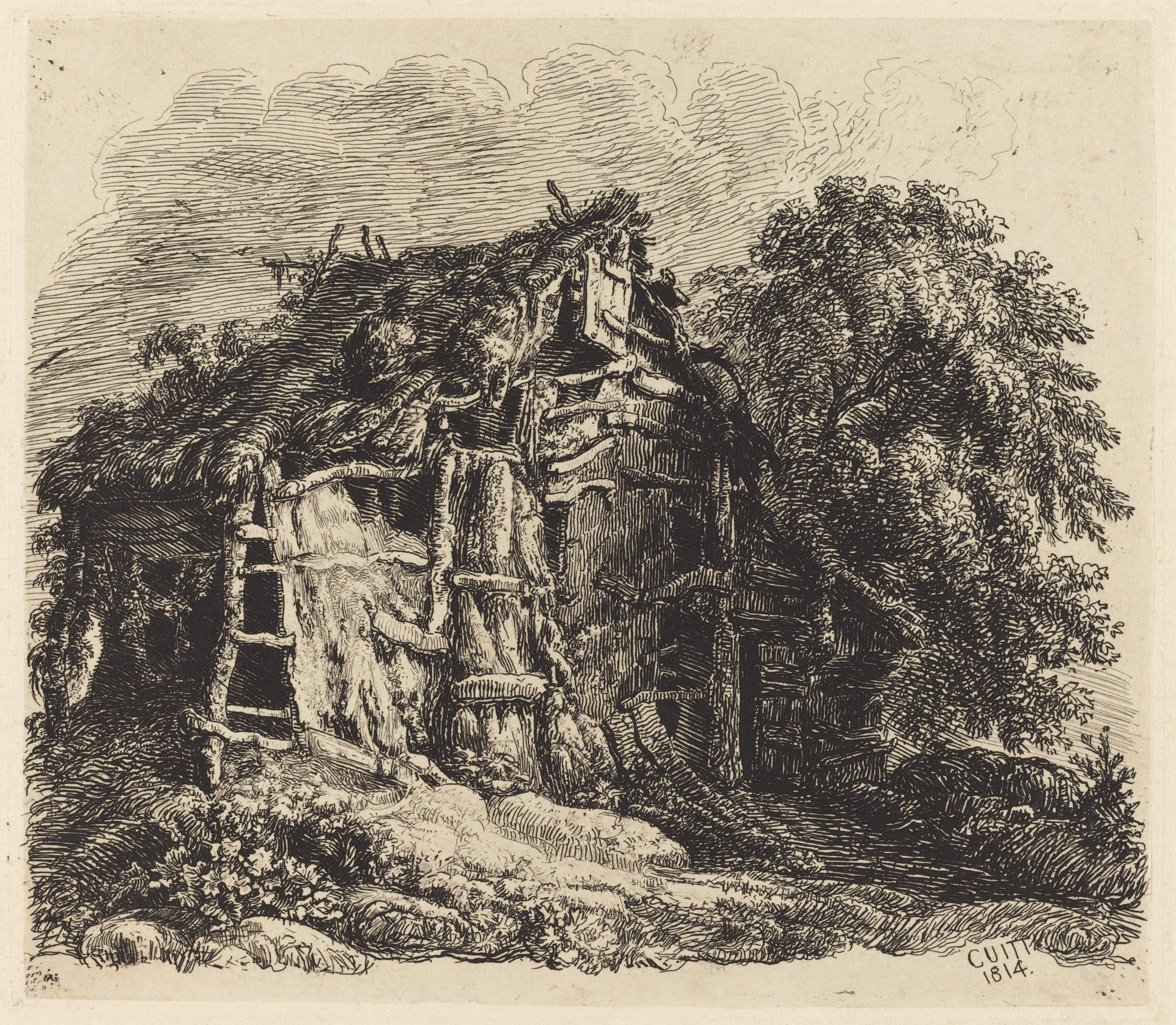
Welsh Hovel at Machynllaeth, etching, 1814

George Cuitt the Younger (1779 – 1854) was an etcher and painter.

He was born at Richmond, in Yorkshire in 1779, the only son of painter George Cuitt the Elder. He followed his father's profession from his youth and added to it the art of etching, which he developed with great success, being induced to do so by a careful study of Piranesi's 'Roman Antiquities.' He went to Chester, where he became a teacher of drawing, and published, in 1810 and 1811, Six Etchings of Saxon and other Buildings remaining at Chester, Six Etchings of Old Buildings in Chester, and Six Etchings of Picturesque Buildings in Chester and, in 1815, five etchings for a History of Chester.

About 1820, having realized a certain competence by his labours, he retired from the more active duties of his profession, and built a house at Masham, near Richmond, from where he published his Yorkshire Abbeys, and in 1848 his collected works, under the title of Wanderings and Pencillings amongst the Ruins of Olden Times. These etchings exhibit considerable talent, verve, originality, and truth.

He died at Masham in 1854.
