= Paolo Zacchia the Elder =

Italian painter

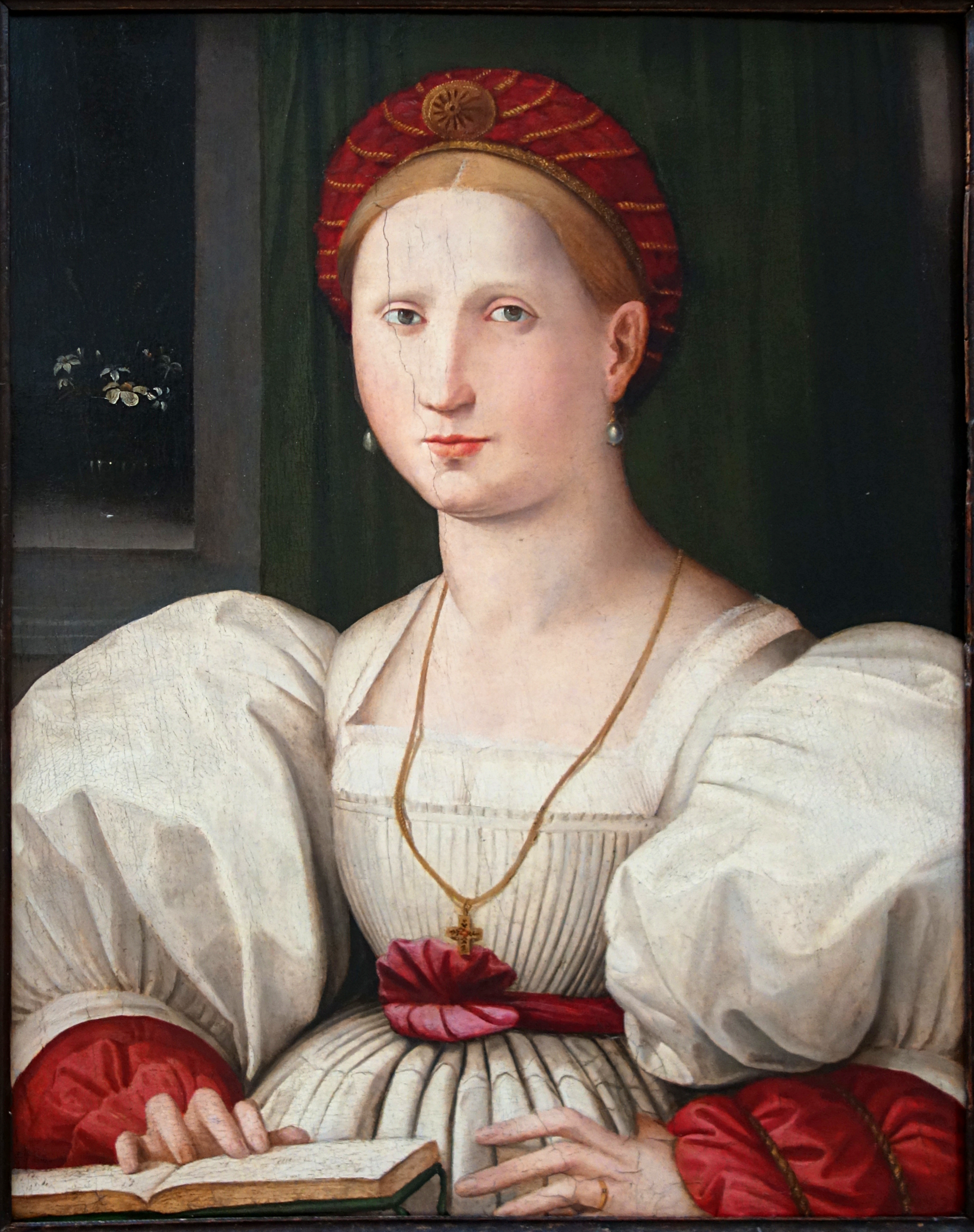
Portrait of a lady

Paolo Zacchia il Vecchio, Zacchia the elder, or Zacchia di Antonio da Vezzano (1490 – 1561) was an Italian painter of the Renaissance period. He was born in Vezzano Ligure and active in Lucca from around 1520 to 1530. He probably trained in Florence, his works show influences of Domenico Ghirlandaio and Fra Bartolomeo. His son Lorenzo di Ferro Zacchia or Zacchia il Giovane was also a painter and engraver active in Lucca, though of little distinction.
