= George Cuitt the Elder =

British painter

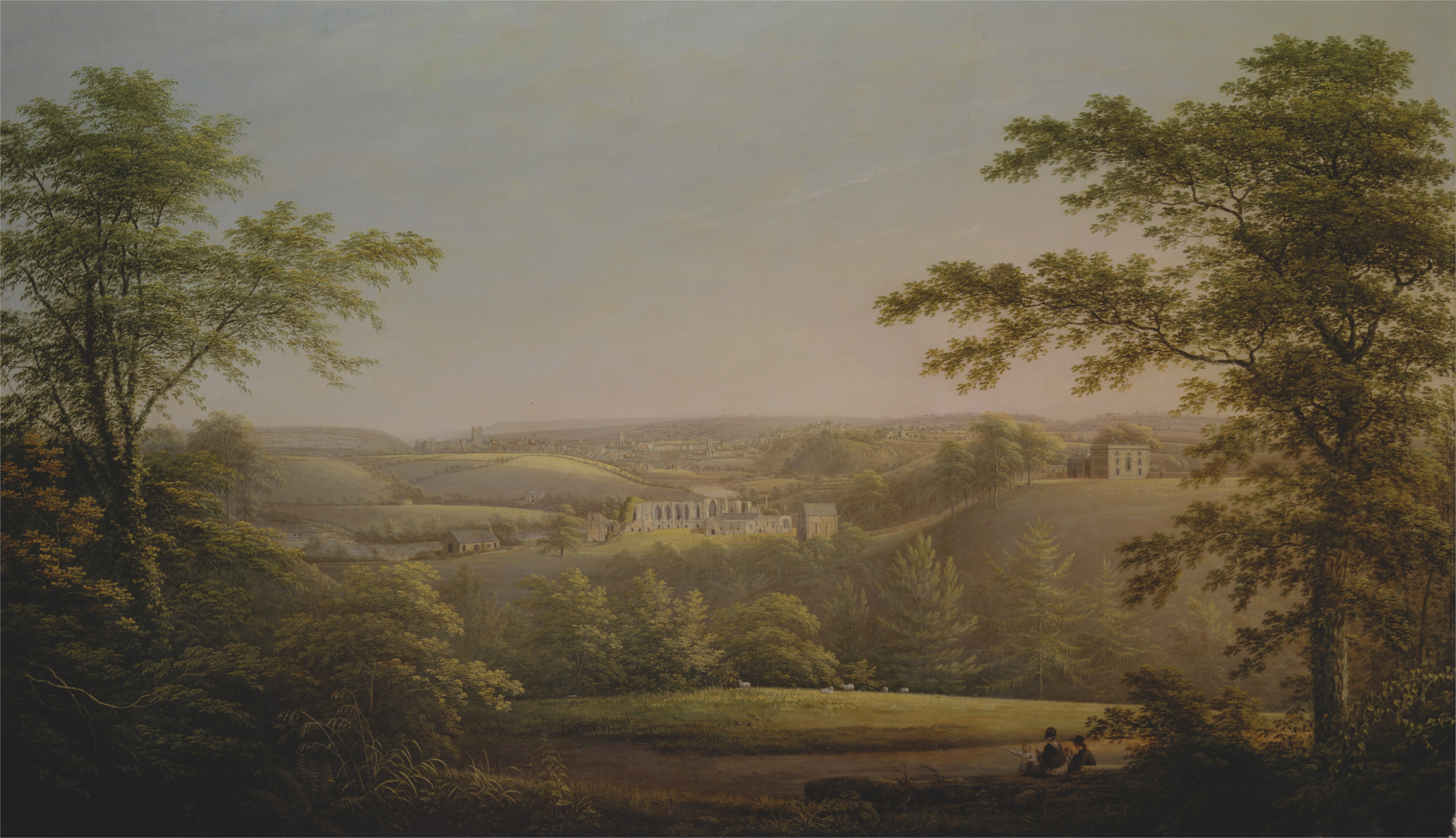
George Cuitt - Easby Hall and Easby Abbey with Richmond, Yorkshire in the Background. c.1800

George Cuitt the Elder (1743–1818) was a British painter.

Cuitt was born at Moulton, in Yorkshire, and having shown a natural taste for drawing and design was sent to Italy at the expense of Sir Lawrence Dundas, whose family had already been painted by him. He studied earnestly for six years at Rome, and also pursued landscape painting, a branch of art that was more congenial to his tastes. He returned to England in 1775, and in 1776 he exhibited at the Royal Academy The Infant Jupiter fed with goat's milk and honey. He afterwards exhibited portraits and landscapes, his last contribution being in 1798. Owing to frequent attacks of low fever he was unable to reside in London, and he finally settled at Richmond in Yorkshire. There he found ready employment in the commissions given him by gentlemen whose parks and residences were in his neighbourhood. His portraits are elaborately finished, although very thinly painted, whilst his earlier landscapes show much ability and feeling in their execution. His son was the artist George Cuitt the Younger.
