= John Brinsley the Younger =

English nonconforming clergyman

John Brinsley the Younger (1600 – 22 January 1665) was an English nonconforming clergyman, who was ejected in 1662.

== Life ==
He was born at Ashby-de-la-Zouch, Leicestershire, son of John Brinsley the Elder. Having been taught by his father, he was admitted to Emmanuel College, Cambridge, at the age of thirteen years and a half. He attended his maternal uncle, Joseph Hall, then dean of Worcester, at the synod of Dort (1618–19), as his amanuensis. On his return to Cambridge he was elected to a scholarship in his college, and took his degrees (B.A. 1619, M.A. 1623).

After being ordained he preached first at Preston, near Chelmsford. In 1625 he was appointed by the corporation of Great Yarmouth their minister. The dean and chapter of Norwich, claiming the right of nomination, disputed the appointment, and he was summoned before the high court of commission at Lambeth. At mid-summer 1627 dismissed from his ministerial function in Yarmouth church, by a decree in chancery, given upon a certificate made by Archbishop William Laud. He continued, however, to preach in the town, in what was then the Dutch chapel. The corporation meanwhile persevered in their struggle with the bishop and the court in his behalf, till in 1632 the king in council forbade his officiating at Yarmouth altogether, committed to prison four persons including Miles Corbet, then recorder of the town, for abetting him.

Brinsley after this exercised his pastoral duties in Lothingland, and, through the interest of Sir John Wentworth of Somerleyton Hall, was appointed to the cure of the parish of Somerleyton. In 1642 Brinsley was again chosen one of the town preachers at Yarmouth, and was one of the investigators of the 1645 witch-hunt in the town, and it is said that in 1650 he occupied the north aisle of the church with the Presbyterians, while William Bridge with the Congregationalists was in possession of the chancel, and the south aisle, with the nave, was left to the prayer book minister. Service in all these was performed simultaneously, the corporation having divided the building for the purpose in 1650.

At the Restoration and the Act of Uniformity 1662 he was ejected for refusing the terms of conformity. He died on 22 January 1665, and he was buried in St. Nicholas's Church, Yarmouth, with several others of the family.

== Works ==
Brinsley published many treatises and sermons, including:

- The Healing of Israels breaches, London, 1642.
- Church Reformation tenderly handled in four sermons, London, 1643.
- The doctrine and practice of Pædo-baptisme asserted and vindicated, London, 1645.
- Stand Still; or, a Bridle for the Times, London, 1647 and 1652.
- Two Treatises: the One handling the Doctrine of Christ's Mediatorship. The other of Mystical Implantation, 2 parts, London, 1651–2.
- The Mystical Brasen Serpent, with the Magnetical Vertue thereof; or, Christ exalted upon the Cross, 2 parts, London, 1653.
- Two Treatises: I. The Saints Communion with Jesus Christ. II. Acquaintance with God, London, 1654.
- Two Treatises: I. A Groan for Israel; or, the Churches Salvation (temporall, spirituall), the desire and joy of Saints'; II. Περιφέρεια. The Spirituall Vertigo, or Turning Sickness of Soul-Unsettlednesse in matters of Religious Concernment, 2 parts, London, 1655.
- Gospel Marrow, the great God giving himself for the sons of men; or, the sacred Mystery of Redemption by Jesus Christ, with two of the ends thereof, justification and sanctification, doctrinally opened, and practically applied, 2 parts, London, 1659.
