= Paolo Caylina the Younger =

Italian painter

Paolo Caylina the Younger was a 16th-century Italian painter active mainly in Brescia in a Renaissance style.

== Biography ==
He was the nephew of both Vincenzo Foppa and Paolo Caylina the Elder, and son of Bartolomeo Caylina. He is sometimes erroneously referred to a Paolo Foppa or Paolo Zoppo. Paolo Caylina the Elder was a son of a painter name Pietro, working in alongside Foppa in 1458 at Pavia, and during 1459–1575 in Brescia. Some sources say Paolo Zoppo painted a bowl with the Sack of Brescia which took place in 1512, planned as a gift for Doge Andrea Gritti, but that the bowl was broken and that this caused him to die of grief at Desenzano at Garda.

He frescoed a scene of the Life of St John the Baptist, including the Banquet of Herod, in 1578 a chapel for the Church of San Giovanni Battista at Edolo.

== Gallery ==
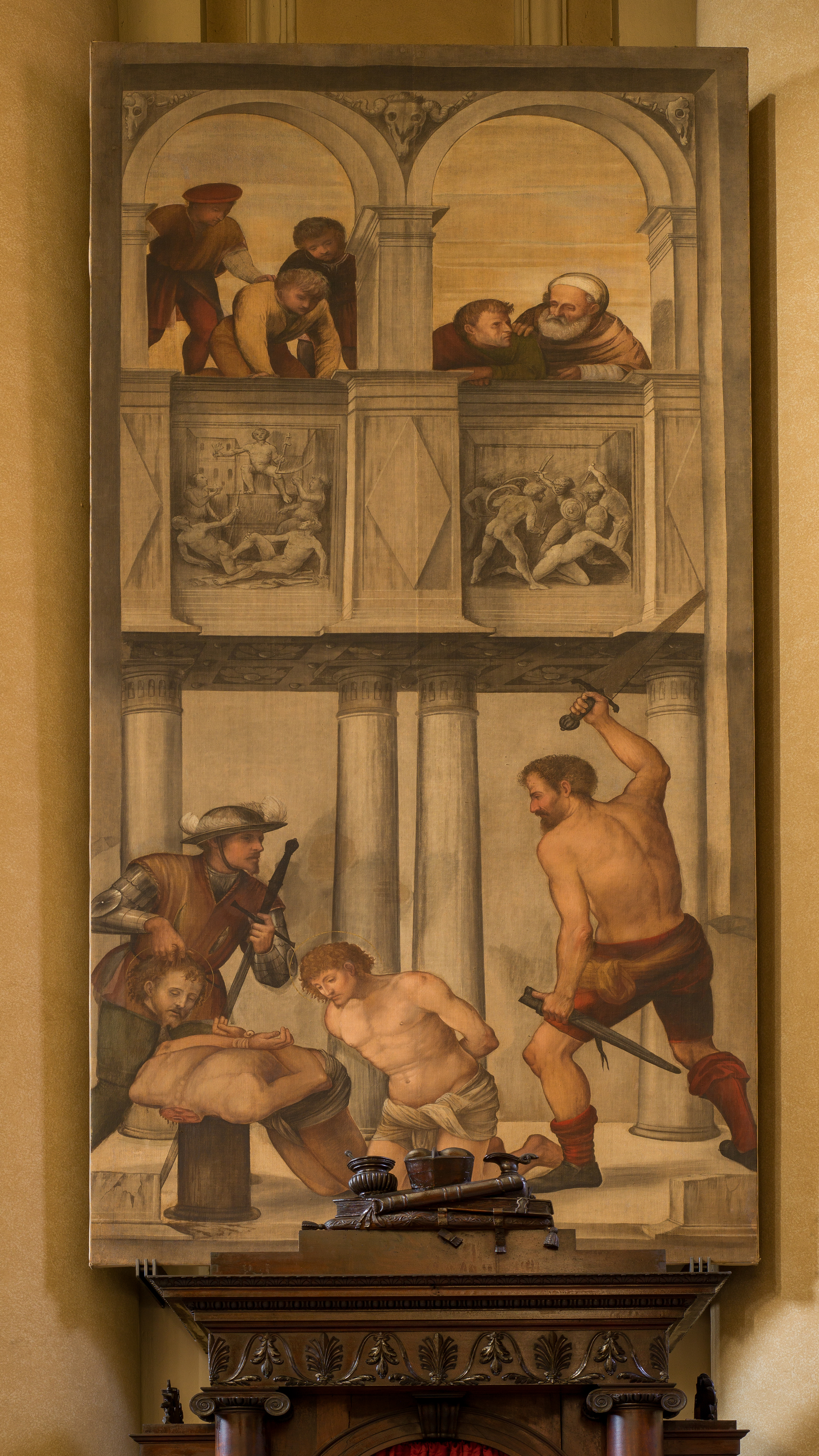
Beheading, Collegiata dei Santi Nazaro e Celso

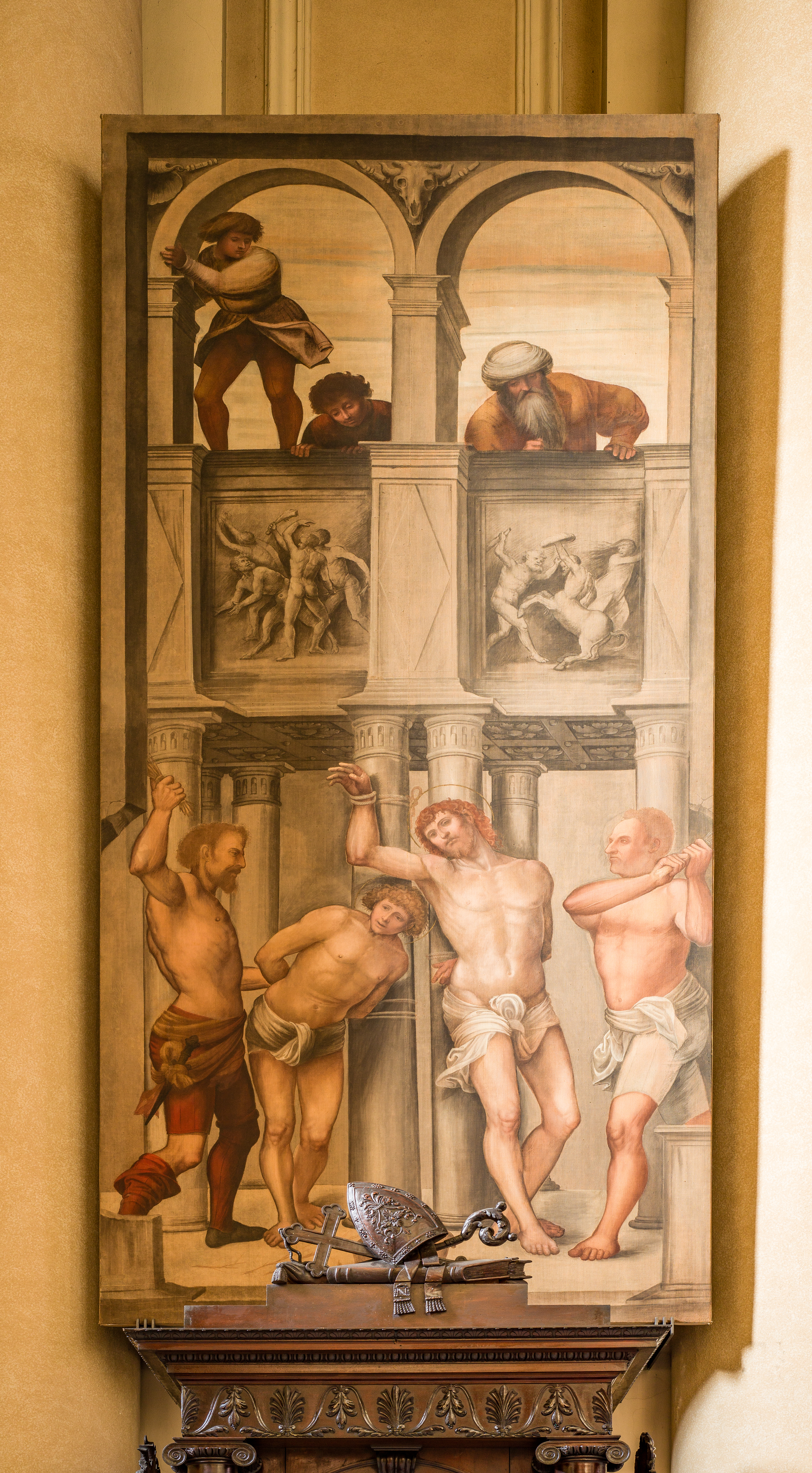
Flogging, Collegiata dei Santi Nazaro e Celso

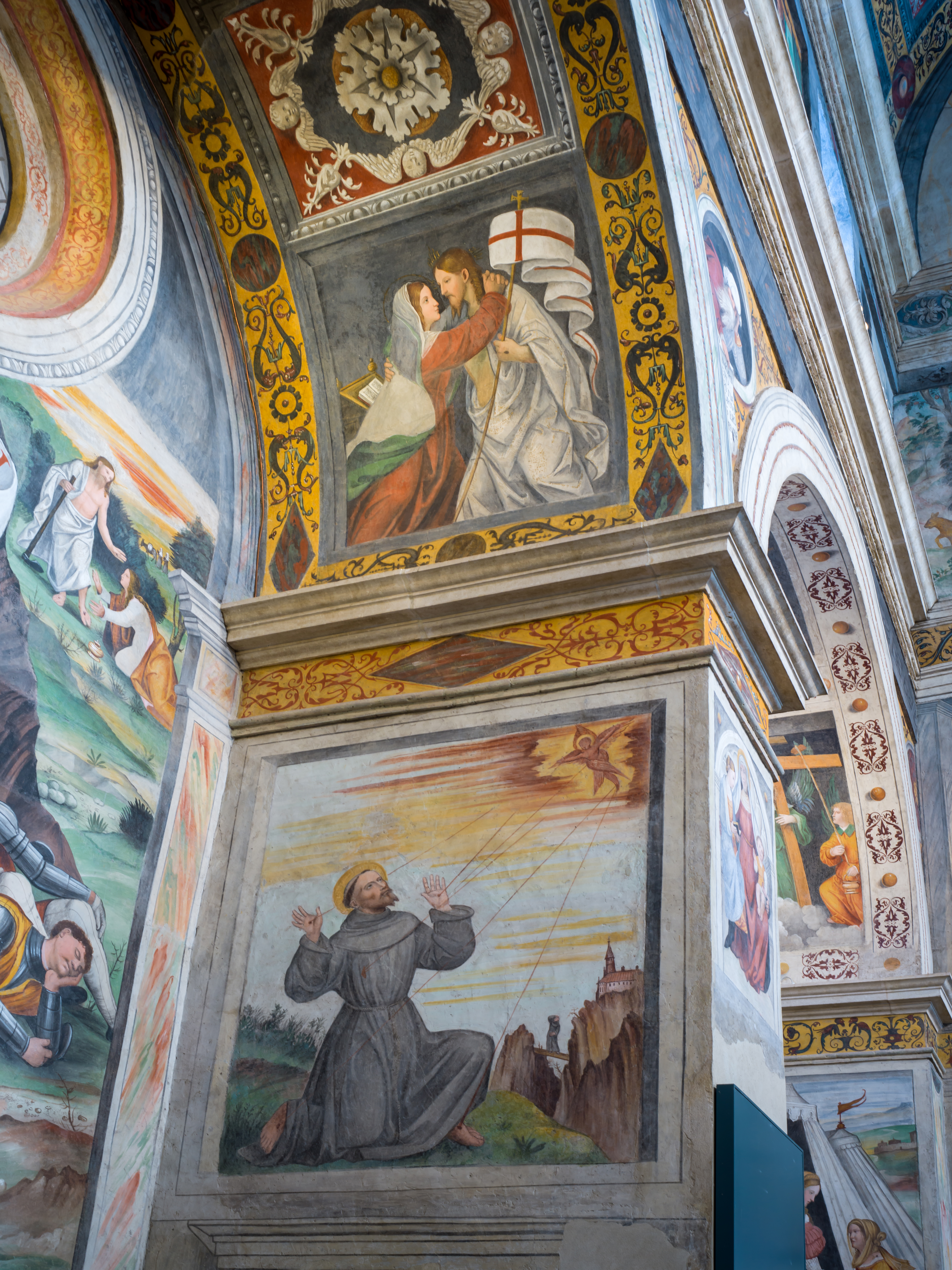
Coro delle Monache, detail of the midchapel with frescos in the Museo di Santa Giulia

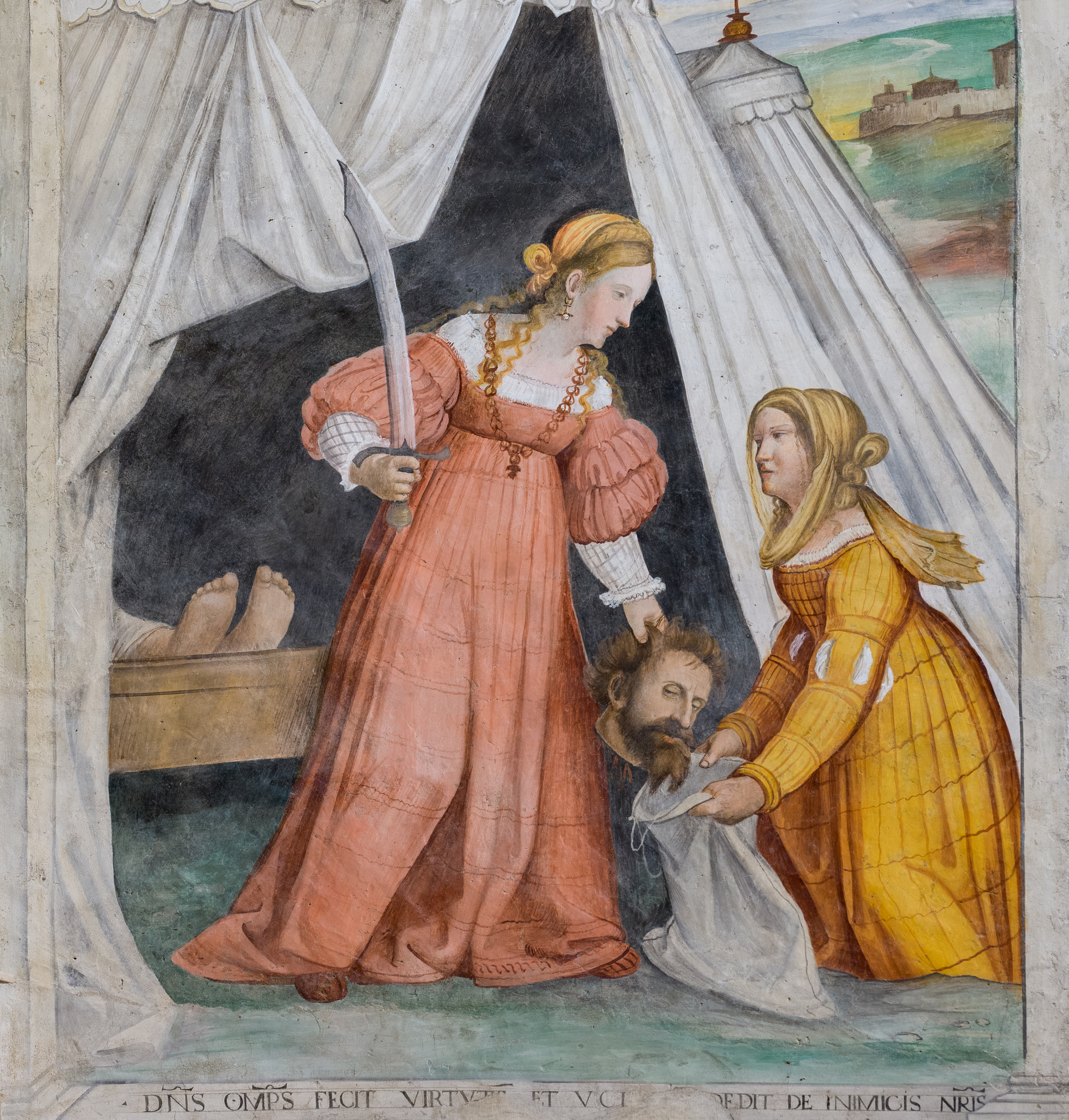
Fresco of Judith and the head of Holophernes in the Museo di Santa Giulia

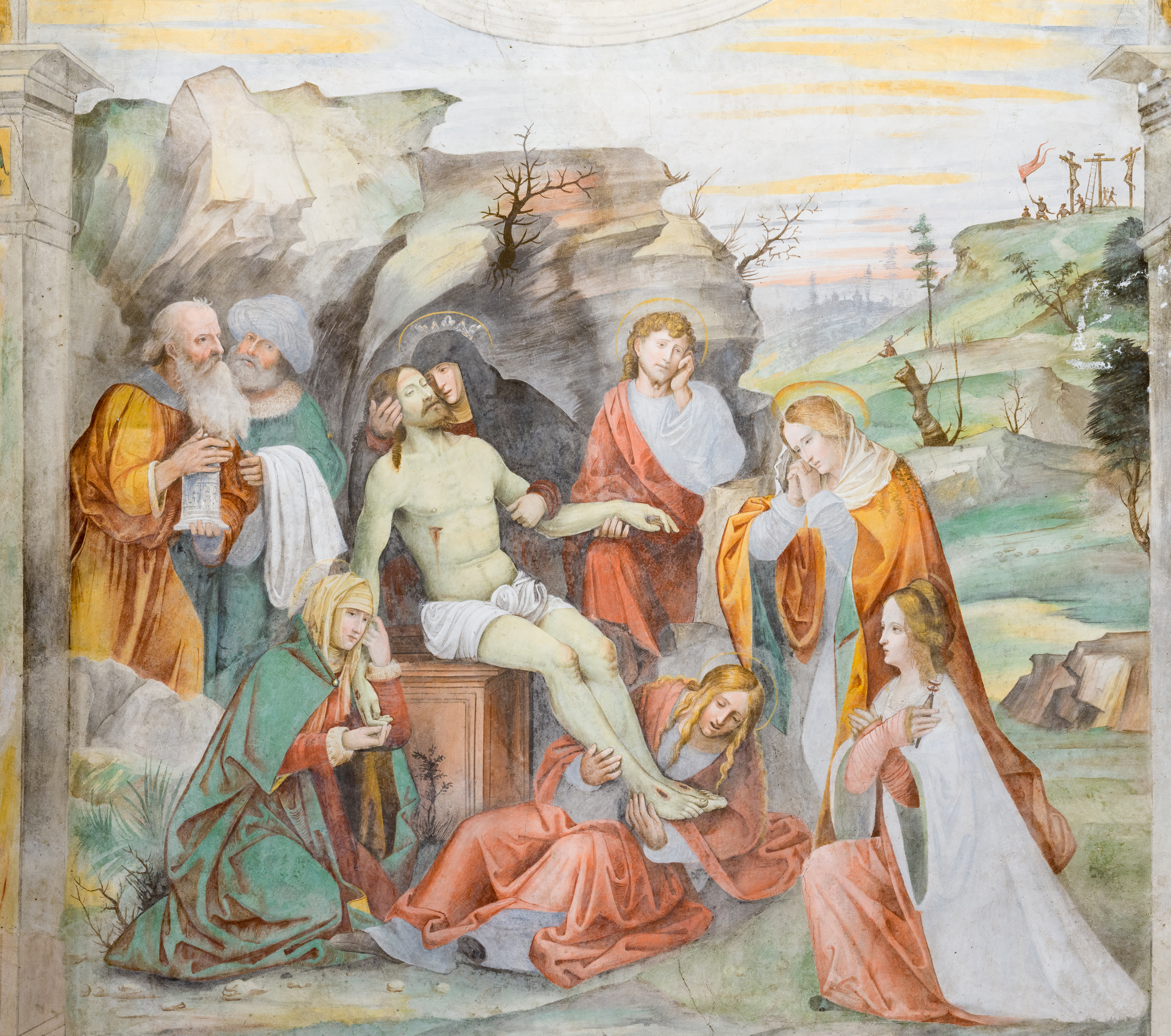
Deposition in the Museo di Santa Giulia

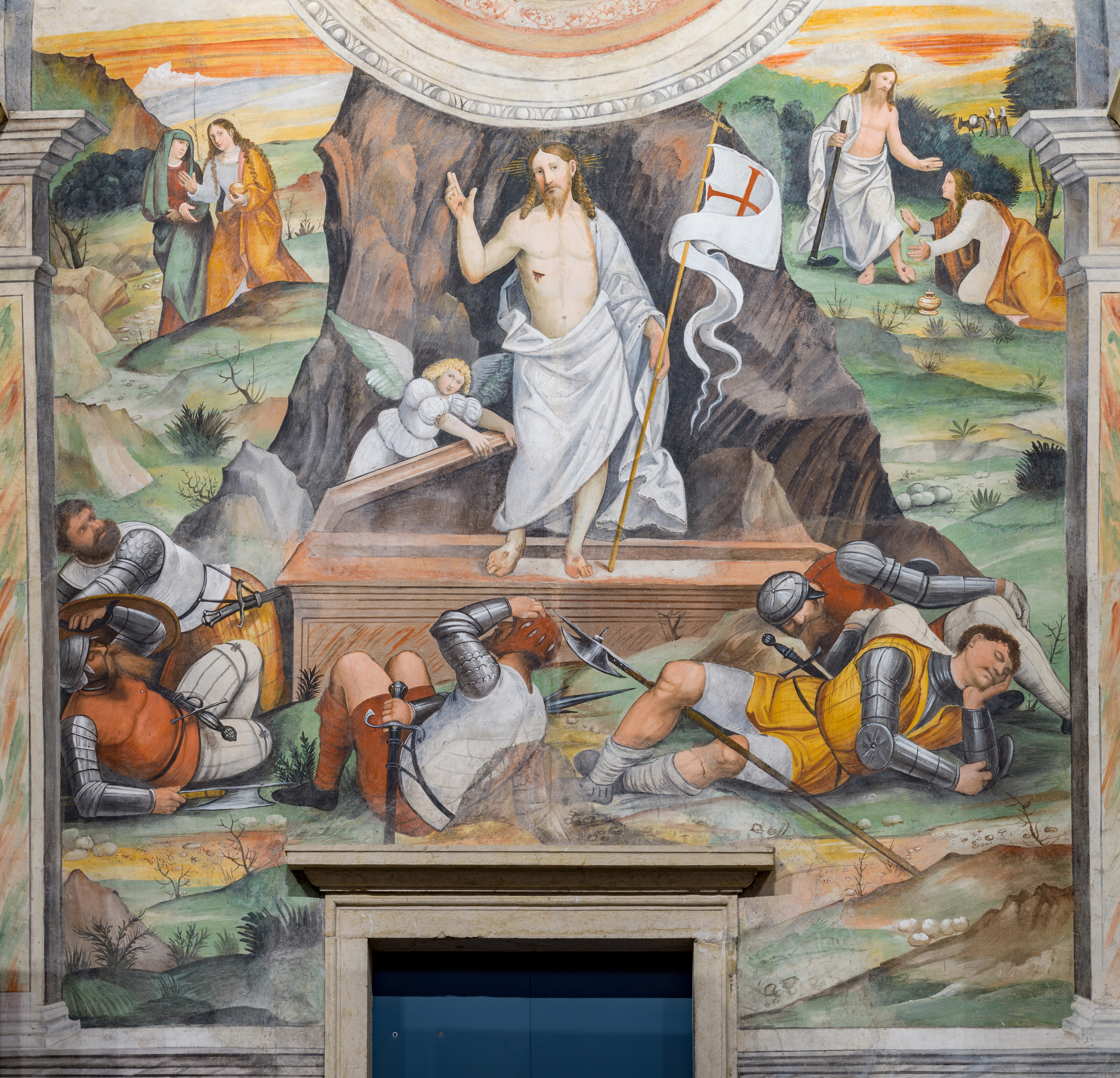
Fresco of Resurrection in the Museo di Santa Giulia
