= John Brinsley the Elder =

English schoolmaster (fl. 1581–1624)

John Brinsley the Elder (fl. 1581–1624) was an English schoolmaster, known for his educational works.

== Life ==
He was educated at Christ's College, Cambridge, where he graduated B.A. in 1584 and M.A. in 1588. He became the master of the school at Ashby-de-la-Zouch in Leicestershire, brought there by Henry Hastings, 3rd Earl of Huntingdon. The astrologer William Lilly, who calls him a "strict puritan", was one of his pupils. Brinsley was close to Arthur Hildersham, a local Puritan minister who at this period ended in the Fleet Prison for his views. Around 1620 Brinsley himself lost his post, expelled for nonconformity, and went to London as a lecturer.

He married a sister of Joseph Hall; John Brinsley the Younger was their son.

== Works ==
His best-known work is Ludus Literarius: or, the Grammar Schoole; shewing how to proceed from the first entrance into learning to the highest perfection required in the Grammar Schooles, London, 1612 and 1627. Generally Brinsley follows Roger Ascham, and was not concerned to be an innovator within the tradition of humanist education, but he did indicate ways of adapting that tradition to the particular context of the grammar school. The work takes the form of a dialogue of two schoolmasters, discussing education of the young in the large. It argues for more regard for the vernacular tongue.

He was much concerned and occupied with classical texts, as translator and for their rhetorical values. The Latin grammar on which he relied was that of William Lilye. Brinsley recommended Ovid, and the Raphael Regius edition, in A Consolation for our Grammar Schooles. In the same work he advocates a more sympathetic approach to teaching, and teacher training, in several anticipations of the views of Comenius.

His Posing of the Parts was recommended by Samuel Hartlib in a 1635 survey of systematic reading methods. This was in the pansophic context of orderly acquisition of knowledge.
