= Nicholas Bourbon (the younger) =

French clergyman and neo-Latin poet

Nicolas Bourbon (1574, Vendeuvre-sur-Barse – 6 August 1644, Paris) was a French clergyman and neo-Latin poet. He wrote in Latin under the name of Nicolaus Borbonius, and under the pseudonyms Horatius Gentilis and Petrus Mola.

Son of a doctor, he studied under political satirist and poet Jean Passerat. Bourbon then held a professorship at the Collège de France and was admitted into the Oratory of Saint Philip Neri in 1630. He was admitted to the Académie Française in 1637 by Cardinal Richelieu, without having solicited the admission. Bourbon is considered one of the greatest Latin poets of France and was described in 1801 as being "equal or superior to any who lived in the last two centuries".
