= Jayhani =

Jayhani or al-Jayhani may refer to:

- Abu Abdallah Muhammad ibn Ahmad al-Jayhani (died 925), geographer and vizier of the Samanid Empire
  - the Jayhani tradition, represented in the Book of Roads and Kingdoms
- Abu Ali Muhammad ibn Muhammad al-Jayhani (died 942), vizier of the Samanid dynasty
- Abu Abdallah Ahmad ibn Muhammad al-Jayhani, vizier of the Samanid Empire (976–977)
