= Ahmad ibn Sahl =

10th-century Iranian aristocrat

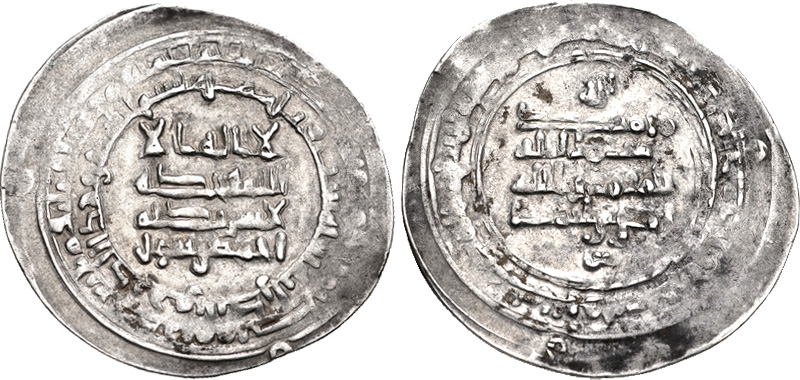
Dirham of Ahmad, minted in Andaraba between 915 and 920.

Ahmad ibn Sahl ibn Hashim (died 920) was an Iranian aristocrat who served the Saffarids and later the Samanids. Kamgar (Gardizi, 332 AH) or Kamkar (Ibn al-Athir, 260 AH) were an Iranian family in the first centuries AH and one of the renowned aristocrat in the Khorasan region (c. 309–31 AH). This family name originates from Kamgar (Gardizi, 332 AH), a Marvi landlord and land-owning magnate, and one of the sons of Yazdgerd III, the last Sassanid king (632–651 AD). Some members of this family held positions in the administration system of Taherians (255–259 AH), Saffarians (247–339 AH) and Samanids (261–395 AH). A prominent figure of this family was Ahmad ibn Sahl ibn Hashim (d. 307 AH). His father and brothers were also secretaries and astronomers. Aside from their political-military role, this family played a crucial role in the preservation of science and Iranian culture by patronizing authors and scientists.

Numerous poets and authors, including Ferdowsi and Suzani Sarmarqandi, have made references to this family in their works. For instance, in Suzani's poem titled "Malik al-Dahaqin," he writes:

مهتر بسی بود، نه همه چون تو کامران
گل ها بسی بود، نه همه همچو کامگار

در باغ مهتری چون گل کامگار باش
تا نیکخواه بوی برد، بدسگال خار

It appears that Suzani refers to someone named Kamgar, who is the son of Yazdegerd III. Mohammadi et al. (2013), in his interpretation of the Book of Kings (Shahnameh), believes that Suzani is alluding to a specific event that was well known to his contemporaries. Similarly, Abu Rayhan Biruni cites an example of Ahmad ibn Sahl, indicating that he was a well-known figure among the people of his time.

Ferdowsi, in the story of Rostam and Shaghad, mentions a wise elder named Azadsarv, who accompanied Ahmad ibn Sahl in Marv and was a descendant of Sam Nariman:

یکی پیر بود نامش آزاد سرو
که با احمد سهل بودی به مرو

The chronicles compiled by Azadsarv on Rostam were among the first, or possibly the first, collections of Iran's national stories in Persian, which eventually reached Ferdowsi. This demonstrates that during this period, there was a significant emphasis on the Persian language and Iran's cultural history, with Ahmad ibn Sahl being a notable patron of these efforts. Based on available sources, with his death, the power of this family declined, and there is no information about the fate of this family after Abu'l-Qasim ibn Hafs. Some members of the Kamgar family, like those of the Sassanian period who were interested in astronomy, were astronomers. This expertise, given the limited means of transferring knowledge in that era and the largely exclusive and intra-family nature of certain sciences, suggests the possibility that this family was connected to the Sasanians. Given that his ministers, such as Azadsarv, Abu'l-Qasim Ka'bi, and Abu Zayd al-Balkhi, were all renowned scholars, it is evident that this family valued sciences and was a supporter and companion of scholars.

== Biography ==
Map of Khurasan, Transoxiana and Tokharistan

Ahmad belonged to a dehqan family of Merv known as the Kamgar (Gardizi, 332 AH) family, which claimed descent from the last Sasanian king, Yazdegerd III. Ahmad was the son of a certain Sahl, and had three unnamed brothers, who were later killed during a local struggle in Merv between Iranians and Arabs. Ahmad, in order to avenge his three brothers, revolted against his overlord, the Saffarid ruler Amr ibn al-Layth (r. 879–901), but was defeated and taken prisoner in Sistan. However, he managed to escape and then returned to Merv, where he captured the local governor Abu Ja'far Ghuri and proclaimed his adherence to Samanid ruler Isma'il ibn Ahmad (r. 892–907). He shortly went to the Samanid court at Bukhara and quickly achieved prominence under Isma'il.

In 900 (or 901), Ismail defeated and captured Amr at Balkh, and shortly conquered his territories in Khurasan, which Ahmad also played a role in. In ca. 902, Ahmad was appointed as the governor of the newly conquered province of Tabaristan. He later served as the commander of the army in Ray and also as leader of the personal guards of the Samanid prince who governed the city, Abu Salih Mansur. During the reign of Isma'il's successor, Ahmad Samani (r. 907–914), Ahmad was sent in 910-11 along with other prominent Samanid officers to conquer Sistan.

During the reign of Ahmad's successor, Nasr II (r. 914–943), Ahmad was sent in 919 to suppress the rebellion of the governor of Khurasan, Husayn ibn Ali Marvarrudhi, which he managed to accomplish. Husayn was captured during the battle and was sent to Bukhara. After a few weeks, however, after being lied to by Nasr, who had been promising him a certain thing, Ahmad shortly rebelled at Nishapur, made incursions into the Samanid city of Gorgan, and managed to repel its governor Karategin. He then fortified himself in Merv to avoid a Samanid counter-attack. Nevertheless, the Samanid general Hamuya ibn Ali managed to lure Ahmad out of Merv and defeated him in a battle at Marw al-Rudh. Ahmad was captured during the battle and imprisoned in Bukhara, where he remained until his death in 920.

== Sources ==
- Bosworth, C. Edmund (1984). "AḤMAD B. SAHL B. HĀŠEM". Encyclopaedia Iranica, Vol. I, Fasc. 6. London et al.: C. Edmund Bosworth. pp. 643–644.
- Houtsma, M. Th (1993). First Encyclopaedia of Islam: 1913–1936. Brill. pp. 579–1203. ISBN 9789004097964.
- Gibb, Hamilton Alexander Rosskeen (1967). "The Encyclopedia of Islam, Volume 1". The Encyclopaedia of Islam, Vol. 1. Brill. pp. 1–1359. ISBN 90-04-08114-3.
- Bosworth, C. E. (2011). The Ornament of Histories: A History of the Eastern Islamic Lands AD 650-1041: The Persian Text of Abu Sa'id 'Abd Al-Hayy Gardizi. I.B.Tauris. pp. 1–169. ISBN 978-1-84885-353-9.
- Hajipour, Fatemeh (2020). Genealogy of the Kamkar family: Khorasan agents in the third and fourth centuries AH. Journal of History and Culture 52.1.
