= Abu Ya'qub al-Sijistani =

10th century Persian Ismaili missionary and Neo-Platonic philosopher

- Title: Chief da'i of Rayy, Sijistan, and Khurasan

Personal life
- Died: 971
- Flourished: 930s–971
- Known for: Introduction of Neoplatonism into Isma'ili theology

Religious life
- Religion: Isma'ili Shi'a Islam

Senior posting
- Predecessor: Abu Hatim al-Razi (Rayy), Muhammad al-Nasafi (Khurasan)

Abu Ya'qub Ishaq ibn Ahmad al-Sijistani (Arabic: أبو يعقوب إسحاق بن أحمد السجستاني) or al-Sijzi (السجزي), also known as Bandaneh (Persian: بندانه), was a 10th-century Persian Ismaili missionary active in the northern and eastern Iranian lands. His life is obscure, but he was a prolific writer, who played a crucial role in the infusion of Neoplatonic ideas into Isma'ili theology.

== Life ==
Al-Sijistani's life is obscure, as references to him are found mostly in isolation in hostile Sunni heresiological works, while Isma'ili sources usually do not provide any details about him. He was given the nickname 'cottonseed' (Arabic: khayshafūj, Persian: banba-dāna or Bandaneh) in several near-contemporary non-Isma'ili works that mention him, but the origin and significance of it are unknown. What can be gleaned from the sources is that he was a senior missionary (dāʿī) in the Iranian lands of the eastern Islamic world.

Nizam al-Mulk reports that a certain Ishaq succeeded Abu Hatim al-Razi as chief dāʿī at Rayy upon the latter's death on 934, while Ibn al-Nadim mentions a certain Abu Ya'qub as the chief dāʿī at Rayy in c. 932–942. This Abu Ya'qub was also in charge of the missionary movement (daʿwa) in Upper Mesopotamia and Iraq, with the brothers Abu Muslim and Abu Bakr ibn hammad in Mosul and Ibn Nafis in Baghdad as his agents. This is likely to have been the same person as al-Sijistani, as it agrees with a statement in one of al-Sijistani's works that he was in Iraq in 934. Earlier opinion among scholars was that he was executed along with Muhammad al-Nasafi in 943, but this is now disproven. In reality, he was al-Nasafi's successor, both as chief dāʿī in Khurasan, as well as in continuing the development of al-Nasafi's theological ideas. Other sources maintain that he was active in Sijistan (whence his nisba), both during and after al-Nasafi's tenure.

The movement he headed was not initially affiliated with the Fatimid Caliphate, but at some point, during the caliphate of al-Mu'izz li-Din Allah (r. 953–975), he accepted the Fatimids as the legitimate imams, and many of his views were taken over by the Fatimid-sponsored daʿwa. According to Rashid al-Din Hamadani, al-Sijistani was executed by the Saffarid emir of Sijistan, Khalaf ibn Ahmad (r. 964–1003). Al-Sijistani's work Kitāb al-iftikhār was written around 971, this provides a terminus post quem for his execution. The introductions to two of his other works indicate they were written during the reign of the Fatimid caliph al-Hakim bi-Amr Allah (r. 996–1021), but they are likely later interpolations. Al-Sijistani died in 971.

== Works ==
Several of al-Sijistani's works survive, having been copied and studied by the Tayyibi Isma'ili communities of Yemen and India. However, as they are regarded as "highly esoteric and restricted", they have been slow to be studied by modern scholars and published in critical editions. Furthermore, as the historian Paul Walker comments, "[a]s they exist now, it is in some cases difficult to determine the original form of the texts", as many survive only in translations or paraphrased summaries. Some works are only known by title or in fragments, being cited or quoted in other works.

=== Kashf al-mahjub ===
The Kashf al-maḥjūb ('Unveiling of the Concealed'), was the first of al-Sijistani's works to become available to scholars. It survives only in a Persian translation, or even paraphrase, of the Arabic original, produced in the 11th century. It comprises seven chapters, each further divided into seven parts. The aim of the work is to 'unveil' divine knowledge (gnosis, irfan), and deals with the concepts of the Oneness of God (tawhid), the stages of creation, the nature of prophethood, and resurrection (qiyāma). Based on its containing passages supporting the idea of metempsychosis, it likely belongs to the early phase of al-Sijistani's career, before he accepted Fatimid orthodoxy.

Excerpts of the work were first published by Mahdi Bayani in 1938 (Namūna-yi sukhan-i Fārsī, Tehran, Shirkat-i Chāp-i Khudkār). The Persian text was published with a French commentary in 1949 by Henry Corbin (Tehran, Institut Franco-Iranien & Paris, A. Maisonneuve). Corbin also published a full French translation in 1988 as Le dévoilement des choses cachées: Kashf al-Maḥjûb, Recherches de philosophie Ismaélienne (Lagrasse, Verdier). A partial English translation was published by Hermann Landolt (Kashf al-maḥjūb, Unveiling of the Hidden) in S.H. Nasr and M. Aminrazavi (eds.), An Anthology of Philosophy in Persia, Volume II (Oxford, Oxford University Press, 2001).

=== Ithbat al-nubu'at ===
The Ithbāt al-nubūʾāt or al-nubuwwāt ('Proofs of Prophecies'). In its seven sections, al-Sijistani "puts forward a variety of proofs for the necessity of prophecy (nubuwwa), also explaining different prophetic eras". According to Paul Walker, it shows signs of later editing, and all available manuscripts are missing the final two sections.

The work was published in Arabic in 1966 by Arif Tamir (Beirut, al-Matba'a al-Kathulikiyya). According to Walker, this edition "contains errors, faulty readings, pages out of order, and extraneous passages".

=== Kitab al-iftikhar ===
The Kitāb al-iftikhār ('The Book of Boasting'), is likely the last of al-Sijistani's works, being written around 971. As its title suggests, it is "strikingly polemical and strikingly defensive and apologetic" work; Walker describes it as "an exceedingly frank confession of the points of difference between himself and the Ismaili daʿwa, on the one hand, and the intellectual, religious world all around him, on the other". For Walker, it is perhaps the "[best] place to look for a definition of [Isma'ili Shiism] in its fourth / tenth-century manifestation", while Farhad Daftary, points out that it "presents a summary exposition of Ismaili doctrine and preserves remnants of the mythological cosmology propounded by the early Ismailis, including the spiritual beings called jadd, fatḥ and khayāl which mediated between the spiritual and the physical worlds".

The work was first partially published by Mustafa Ghalib in 1980 (Beirut, Dar al-Andalus), but "suffers from inaccuracies and serious omissions". In 2000 a "definitive" edition with an English commentary was published by Ismail K. Poonawala (Beirut, Dar al-Gharb al-Islami).

=== Al-Yanabi ===
The Kitāb al-Yanābīʿ [al-ḥikma] ('Book of the Wellsprings/Sources [of Wisdom]'), was written around 961, and extensively paraphrased by the 11th-century dāʿī Nasir Khusraw in his own Khwān al-ikhwān. The work is a collection of treatises on about forty themes or 'wellsprings'. According to Daftary, the work's primary theme is "the wellsprings of human knowledge and spiritual life in each era of religious history", while Walker emphasizes that "portions of this work are purely Neoplatonic in the tone and in the content of its teachings; other sections bring these concepts in line with the author's Shiite interpretation of religious knowledge and its purveyors".

The work was first published in a critical edition, with a partial French translation (Le livre des sources) in Henry Corbin's 1961 Trilogie Ismailienne (Tehran, Département d’Iranologie de l’Institut Franco-Iranien and Paris, A. Maisonneuve). An Arabic edition was published by Mustafa Ghalib in 1965 (Beirut, al-Maktab al-Tijari), and an English translation by Paul Walker in 1994 as part of The Wellsprings of Wisdom: A Study of Abu Yaqub al-Sijistani's Kitab al-Yanabi (Salt Lake City, University of Utah Press).

=== Al-Maqalid ===
The Kitāb al-Maqālīd ('Book of the Keys'), comprises seventy chapters. According to Walker, it is of exceptional importance as it is "relatively late and by any account the most comprehensive" of al-Sijistani's works, but remains unpublished.

=== Al-Nusra ===
The Kitāb al-Nuṣra ('Book of the Support/Defence'), is no longer extant, except for extensive quotations in Hamid al-Din al-Kirmani's Kitāb al-riyāḍ. The work is one of al-Sijistani's earlier writings, composed as a defence of his predecessor and teacher, Muhammad al-Nasafi, against the accusations of antinomianism by Abu Hatim Ahmad ibn Hamdan al-Razi.

=== Sullam al-najat ===
The Sullam al-najāt ('Ladder of Salvation') survives only in an incomplete form. In it, al-Sijistani gives a summary of the Isma'ili doctrine (madhhab). According to Walker, these can be summarized as "faith in God, His angels, His books, His emissaries, the last day, salvation after death, and paradise and hellfire".

Its Arabic text was published by Muhtadi Mustafa Ghalib in 2002 (Salamiyya, Dar al-Ghadir). An English translation is part of a 1983 doctoral dissertation by M. Alibhai (Abu Ya'qub al-Sijistānī and Kitab Sullam al-Najāt: A Study in Islamic Neoplatonism, Harvard University).

=== Epistles ===
The epistle Risalat tuḥfat al-mustajībīn expounding on Isma'ili doctrine was published by Arif Tamir in Khams rasāʾil Ismāʿīliyya and reprinted since in al-Mashriq in March/April 1967, and in Tamir's Thalāth rasāʾil Ismāʿīliyya.

The epistle al-Risāla al-bāhira fi’l-maʿād was published by Boustan Hirji in 1992 (Taḥqīqāt-i Islāmī, Vol. 7), with a Persian-language translation by Abdallah Nurani. An English-language translation was published as part of B. Hirji's doctoral thesis A Study of al-Risālah al-Bāhirah (McGill University, 1994).

== Sources ==
- Daftary, Farhad (2004). Ismaili Literature: A Bibliography of Sources and Studies. London and New York: I.B. Tauris. ISBN 978-0-8577-1386-5.
- Daftary, Farhad (2007). The Ismāʿı̄lı̄s: Their History and Doctrines (Second ed.). Cambridge: Cambridge University Press. ISBN 978-0-521-61636-2.
- Stern, S. M. (1960). "Abū Yaʿḳūb Isḥāḳ b. Aḥmad al-Sid̲j̲zī". In Gibb, H. A. R.; Kramers, J. H.; Lévi-Provençal, E.; Schacht, J.; Lewis, B. & Pellat, Ch. (eds.). The Encyclopaedia of Islam, Second Edition. Volume I: A–B. Leiden: E. J. Brill. p. 160. OCLC 495469456.
- Stern, S. M. (1960). "The Early Ismā'Īlī Missionaries in North-West Persia and in Khurāsān and Transoxania". Bulletin of the School of Oriental and African Studies. 23 (1): 56–90. doi:10.1017/s0041977x00148992. S2CID 162532568.
- Walker, Paul Ernest (1983). "ABŪ YAʿQŪB SEJESTĀNĪ". In Yarshater, Ehsan (ed.). Encyclopædia Iranica. Vol. I/4: Abū Manṣūr Heravı̄–Adat. London and New York: Routledge & Kegan Paul. pp. 396–398. ISBN 978-0-71009-093-5.
- Walker, Paul Ernest (1993). Early Philosophical Shiism: the Ismaili Neoplatonism of Abu Ya'qub al-Sijistani. Cambridge University Press. ISBN 0-521-44129-3.
- Walker, Paul Ernest (2014). "Sijistānī, Abū Yaʿqūb al-". In Kalin, Ibrahim (ed.). The Oxford Encyclopedia of Philosophy, Science, and Technology in Islam. Oxford: Oxford University Press. pp. 255–257. ISBN 978-0-19-981257-8.
