= Faraj ben Salim =

13th-century Sicilian-Jewish physician and translator

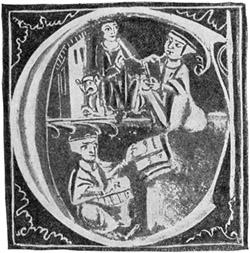
Charles of Anjou giving an Arabic manuscript to Faraj for translation, from a medieval illumination.

Faraj ben Sālim (Moses Ferrauto) (Arabic: فرج بن سالم, Hebrew: פרג' בן סלומון), also known as Ferrauto of Girgenti, Moses Farachi of Dirgent, Ferragius, Farragus, or Franchinus, was a Sicilian-Jewish physician and translator who flourished in the second half of the thirteenth century.

== Work ==
He was engaged by Charles I of Anjou as translator of medical works from Arabic into Latin. In this capacity he rendered a great service to medicine by making in 1279 a Latin translation of Abu Bakr al-Razi's medical encyclopedia, Al-Hawi (later printed in 1486, under the title Continens, with a glossary by the translator). The translation is followed, between the same covers, by De expositionibus vocabulorum seu synonimorum simplicis medicinæ, which Moritz Steinschneider supposes to form a part of the Continens. As a token of his esteem for the translator, Charles of Anjou ordered that on the original copy of the manuscript of the Continens (MS. Bibliothèque nationale de France, Paris, No. 6912) the portrait of Faraj should be drawn beside his own by friar Giovanni of Monte Cassino, the greatest illuminator of his time.

Faraj also translated De medicinis expertis, attributed to Galen and included in the printings of his works by the Giuntas (Venice, 1565: x. 103–109) and René Chartier (Paris, 1679: x. 561–570); and Tacuini Ægritudinum (Tables of Disease, Arabic: Taqwim al-Abdan) by ibn Jazla, published at Strasbourg in 1532. Steinschneider believes that to Faraj should also be ascribed the Latin translation of Masarjawaih's treatise on surgery (MS. Bibliothèque Nationale, Paris, No. 7131), said to have been made by a certain Ferrarius.

== Translations ==
The first folio of the work translated by Faraj ben Sālim, Havi seu contenants (known as Continens) by Zakariya Razi, now preserved at the Bibliothèque nationale de France in Paris.

To the translation in 1279 of Avicenna's "Medical encyclopedia" (Arabic for "al-Hawi fī l-ṭibb"), in 25 volumes, which include medical methodologies of Greece, Syria and Arabia.

- De Ex-positionibus Vocabulorum seu Synonimorum Simplicis Medicinae, which Steinschneider supposes to form a part of continens.
- Faraj b. Sālim also translated the De medicinis Expertis,attributed to Galen and included in his works.
- Another work was the Tacuini Aegritudinum, (Arabic: Taqwīm al-abdān)by Ali ibn Jazla, published in Strasbourg in 1532.
- Translated into Sicilian by Faraj was the Tacuinis sanitatis (Tables of Diseases,Arabic Taqwīm al-ṣiḥḥa) whose author was Ibn Buṭlān, a work illustrated with representations of plants in their natural environment, plants of scientific and non-scientific interest within an agricultural calendar.
- Steinschneider believes that Faraj should be credited with the Latin translation of Masawayh'sTreatise on, stating that it was prepared by a certain Ferrarius of Girgenti.
- Perì agmon, treatise on Hippocrates, also known in Arabic as Kitab al-jabr (i.e. On the Cutting of Bones).
- Edemus of Rodhes, Theophrates, Presocratics and other authors, described by Rushed in 1997 in the lost commentary attributed to Alexander the Great, found as simple quotations.
