= Abu Abdallah Muhammad ibn Ahmad al-Jayhani =

Persian vizier of the Samanid Empire

Abu Abdallah Jayhani

Vizier of the Samanid Empire
- In office 914–922
- Monarch: Nasr II
- Preceded by: Abu Bakr Katib
- Succeeded by: Abu'l-Fadl al-Bal'ami

Personal details
- Born: Jayhan, Transoxiana
- Died: 925 Bukhara, Transoxiana
- Children: Abu Ali Muhammad
- Parent: Ahmad Jayhani (father)

Abū ʿAbdallāh Muḥammad ibn Aḥmad Jayhānī (Persian: ابو عبدالله محمد بن احمد جیهانی), or Abu Abdallah Jayhani (ابو عبدالله جیهانی; also spelled al-Gayhani, Jaihani), was the Persian vizier of the Samanid Empire from 914 to 922. His lost geographical work (which was preserved in later authors' books) is an important source of 9th-century history of Central Asia and Eastern Europe. His son and grandson also served as viziers.

== Life ==
Most details of the life of Jayhani are unknown. He was the son of Ahmad Jayhani, and had a brother named Ubaydallah Jayhani. Spelling patterns in his works suggests that Persian was his native language. Yaqut al-Hamawi also recorded that Jayhani frequently used the Persian expression "bedāw andarūn" ("rush in"). Al-Muqaddasi noted that Jayhani studied philosophy, astronomy and geometry. Furthermore, he also stated that Jayhani would assemble together foreigners and ask them about the lands and the routes to get to different territories. Jayhani was a secret adherent to Manichaeism, according to Ibn al-Nadim.

During his early career, Jayhani was a student of Abu Zayd al-Balkhi, and used to give him female slaves as gifts, but later left him, due to his Kitab al-Qarabin wa'l-dhaba'ih (Book on Sacrifices and Offerings), which Jayhani disapproved. Jayhani was made guardian of Nasr II in 913. A year later, his 8-year-old ward became the ruler (emir) of the Samanid Empire and Jayhani was appointed vizier.

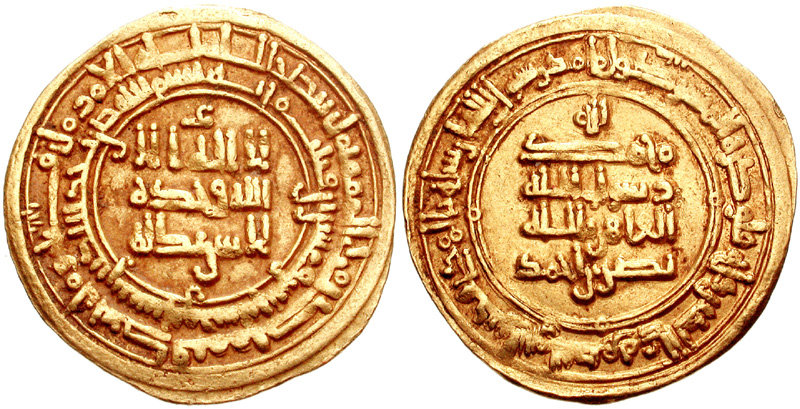
Coin minted during the reign of Nasr II

Due to Nasr's youth, Jayhani undertook the regency of the empire. Almost immediately a series of revolts broke out within the state, the most serious being the one led by his great-uncle Ishaq ibn Ahmad. Ishaq's sons took part in the rebellion; one son, Abu Salih Mansur, took control of Nishapur and several other cities in Khorasan. Eventually, Ishaq was captured, while Abu Salih Mansur died in Nishapur. Nasr's ascension also brought instability to the peripheries of the Samanid state. The Abbasid Caliphate managed to recover Sistan for the last time, while Ray and Tabaristan were taken by the Alid Hasan al-Utrush. Despite being unable to recover the provinces, the Samanids employed numerous local Daylamite and Gilite leaders and remained active in the struggles there.

After the largest mosque of Bukhara was destroyed, Jayhani financed the erection of a minaret, according to Narshakhi. Ahmad ibn Fadlan, who met him in 921, recorded that the people referred to him as "the elder bulwark", evidencing that Jayhani was still regarded as a most influential figure in Nasr II's court. A year later, however, Abu'l-Fadl al-Bal'ami succeeded him as vizier. Jayhani died in 925. His son, Abu Ali Jayhani, was vizier of the Samanid Empire from 938 to 941. Abu Ali's son, Abu Abdallah Ahmad, held the same office between 974 and 976.

== Works ==
Ibn al-Nadim, who confused Abu Abdallah Jayhani with his grandson, attributed four books to Abu Abdallah. Yaqut al-Hamawi, who used al-Nadim's work as a source for his own work, even caused additional confusion by blending the three consecutive generations of the Jayhani family. According to historian István Zimonyi, the four books "point to an author experienced in politics, as every book is connected with state affairs".

=== The Book of Routes and Kingdoms ===
Jayhani "assembled around himself some foreigners and questioned them about the countries and their revenues, the condition of roads thither, the elevation of the stars above the horizons there and the length of the meridian shadows cast by the sun", according to al-Muqaddasi. The total book (Arabic: كتاب المسالك والممالك, romanized: Kitāb al-Masālik waʿl-Mamālik) spanned seven volumes and was said to also incorporate the whole of Ibn Khordadbeh's work.

== Legacy ==
Much of Jayhani's work did not survive; it was largely known through references found in other authors' work. His work informed the later Muslim geographer Ibn Hawqal, who used Jayhani's book, and described a mountain stretching "along the spine of the earth".

== See also ==
- Geography and cartography in medieval Islam

== Sources ==
- Crone, Patricia; Treadwell, Luke (2003). "A new text on Ismailism at the Samanid court". Texts, documents, and artefacts: Islamic studies in honour of D.S. Richards. Leiden: Brill. pp. 37–67. ISBN 978-9-00412864-4. Archived from the original on 2024-07-09.
- Zimonyi, István (2016). Muslim Sources on the Magyars in the Second Half of the 9th Century. Brill. ISBN 978-90-04-21437-8.
- Zadeh, Travis (2013). "Of Mummies, Poets, and Water Nymphs: Tracing the Codicological Limits of Ibn Khurradādhbih's Geography". In Bernards, Monique (ed.). ʿAbbasid Studies IV: Occasional Papers of the School of ʿAbbasid Studies, Leuven, July 5-July 9, 2010. Gibb Memorial Trust. pp. 8–75. ISBN 978-0-906094-98-3.
- Ahmad, S. Maqbul (1998). "Part One: Geodesy, Geology and mineralogy. Geography and cartography". History of Civilizations of Central Asia Volume IV: The Age of Achievement: A.D. 750 to the End of the Fifteenth Century - Part Two: The achievements. UNESCO. pp. 205–221. ISBN 9789231036545.
- Frye, R. N. (1975). "The Sāmānids". In Frye, Richard N. (ed.). The Cambridge History of Iran: From the Arab Invasion to the Saljuqs. Vol. 4. Cambridge: Cambridge University Press. pp. 136–161. ISBN 0-521-20093-8.
- Pellat, Ch. (2004). "al-Djayhānī". In Bearman, P. J.; Bianquis, Th.; Bosworth, C. E.; van Donzel, E. & Heinrichs, W. P. (eds.). The Encyclopaedia of Islam, Second Edition. Volume XII: Supplement. Leiden: E. J. Brill. pp. 265–266. doi:10.1163/1573-3912_islam_SIM_8505. ISBN 978-90-04-13974-9.
- Treadwell, W. L. (1991). The Political History of the Sāmānid State (PhD thesis). University of Oxford.

Preceded by Abu Bakr Katib	Vizier of the Samanid Empire; 914 – 922	Succeeded by Abu'l-Fadl al-Bal'ami
