= Abu Hatim al-Razi =

Abu Hatim al-Razi may refer to:

- Abu Hatim Muhammad ibn Idris al-Razi (811–890), hadith scholar
- Abu Hatim Ahmad ibn Hamdan al-Razi (died ca. 934), Isma'ili theologian and philosopher
