= Al-Nasafi =

Al-Nasafi may refer to:

- Muhammad ibn Ahmad al-Nasafi (d. 943), Isma'ili missionary
- Abu al-Mu'in al-Nasafi, 10th/11th-century Muslim scholar in Central Asia
- Abu Hafs Umar al-Nasafi, 10th/11th-century Muslim scholar (d. 1142)
- Aziz ad-Din Nasafi (Aziz ad-Din ibn Muhammad al-Nasafi, also Azizuddin Nasafi, also 'Abd-al-'Aziz al-Din al-Nasafi), 13th-century Persian practitioner of Sufism. Studied by Edward Henry Palmer and others.
- Burhanuddin Mohammad al-Nasafi, 13th-century Muslim scholar who was a teacher of al-Allama al-Hilli
- Abu al-Barakat al-Nasafi, 14th-century Muslim scholar
