= Muhammad ibn Ahmad al-Nasafi =

10th-century Isma'ili theologian

- Title: Chief da'i of Khurasan and Transoxiania

Personal life
- Died: 943/944/945 Bukhara
- Flourished: 937–943
- Home town: Nasaf
- Children: Mas'ud
- Notable work: Kitāb al-Maḥṣūl
- Known for: Conversion of Nasr II, introduction of Neoplatonism into Isma'ili theology

Religious life
- Religion: Isma'ili Shi'a Islam

Senior posting
- Predecessor: Husayn ibn Ali al-Marwazi

Abu'l-Hasan Muhammad ibn Ahmad al-Bazdawi al-Nasafi (or al-Bazdahi, al-Nakhshabi) (died 943/945) was an early 10th-century Isma'ili missionary (da'i) and theologian. In c. 937 he succeeded in converting the Samanid emir, Nasr II, to Isma'ilism, and ushered in a period of Isma'ili dominance at the Samanid court that lasted until Nasr's death. In the subsequent persecution of the Isma'ilis, launched by Nuh I, al-Nasafi himself fell victim. As a theologian, he is generally credited with being among those who introduced Neoplatonic concepts into Isma'ili theology. His doctrines dominated indigenous Isma'ilism in the Iranian lands in the 9th–10th centuries, but were denounced as antinomian by Isma'ili theologians aligned with the Fatimid Caliphate.

== Life ==
Al-Nasafi's life is mainly known through later, and mostly hostile Sunni sources, chiefly the Kitab al-Fihrist of Ibn al-Nadim and the Siyasatnama of Nizam al-Mulk. To these is added al-Tha'alibi's mirror for princes, the Adab al-muluk, which was not published until 1990. As his nisbah indicates, Muhammad al-Nasafi was born in the village of Bazda near Nasaf or Nakhshab (in modern Uzbekistan). Some early 20th-century scholars like Louis Massignon and Wladimir Ivanow read the nisbah as 'al-Barda'i', indicating an origin from Barda'a, but this has been shown to be erroneous.

The Samanid Empire around the time of al-Nasafi's death

He succeeded Husayn ibn Ali al-Marwazi as the chief Isma'ili missionary (da'i) of Khurasan and Transoxiania, in the northeastern fringes of the contemporary Islamic world. The area was ruled at the time by the Samanid dynasty under Nasr II (r. 914–943). From early on, al-Nasafi focused his efforts in converting members of the Samanid court at Bukhara, leaving a certain Abu al-Hasan ibn Sawada as his deputy in Marw al-Rudh. His initial efforts apparently failed, and al-Nasafi had to leave Bukhara and returned to his native Nasaf. In c. 937/8 he succeeded in converting several high-ranking Samanid officials to Isma'ilism; Nizam al-Mulk provides a list of these initial converts, whose accuracy is open to question, as many of these names are otherwise unknown: al-Nasafi's compatriot Abu Bakr al-Nakhshabi, a boon companion of the Emir, Abu Ash'ath, the Emir's private secretary, Abu Mansur al-Shaghani, inspector of the army, the chamberlain Aytash, Hasan Malik, governor of Ilaq, and the chief court steward (wakil khass), Ali Zarrad.

Returning to Bukhara in person, with their aid al-Nasafi finally managed to convert Emir Nasr II and his vizier, Abu Ali Muhammad al-Jayhani. Al-Tha'alibi's account however ascribes the final conversion of Nasr to two other figures, the da'i Ibn Sawada and the secretary Abu al-Tayyib al-Mus'abi. Backed by the emir and his court, al-Nasafi began preaching openly, and even extended his missionary efforts into Sistan. The Isma'ili secretary, al-Mus'abi, even appears to have become vizier in 941/42, succeeding al-Jayhani.

These developments provoked a vehement opposition among the Sunni establishment, and especially the Samanids' Turkic soldiery. According to the story as relayed by Nizam al-Mulk, they began to conspire for a coup, even going as far as offering the throne to one of their commanders. According to Nizam al-Mulk, the Emir's son, Nuh I (r. 943–954), got wind of the conspiracy and persuaded his father to abdicate in his favour. As the British historian Samuel Miklos Stern noted in 1960, "it is difficult to disentangle the legendary elements from the true facts" of Nizam al-Mulk's account, especially since the Fihrist does not mention a military plot, but has Nasr 'repenting' of his conversion, and al-Tha'alibi's account does not even have Nasr abdicating in favour of his son. Based on al-Tha'alibi, Nasr appears to have remained on his throne until his death in April 943, and it is very likely that he died as an Isma'ili, but that a long illness forced him to withdraw from public affairs earlier than that.

Al-Tha'alibi reports that after Nasr's death and the accession of Nuh, the Isma'ilis tried to convert the new emir as well, but failed. According to Ibn al-Nadim, Nuh held a public theological debate, in which the Isma'ilis were defeated, but al-Tha'alibi contends that this happened in a private session, and that al-Nasafi's subsequent request for a public debate was denied. Shortly after, Nuh launched an anti-Isma'ili pogrom—according to Nizam al-Mulk, the troops spent seven days killing Isma'ili followers in Bukhara and its environs—in which al-Nasafi and many of his followers perished. The dating of this event is unclear, with both medieval and modern sources variously placing it in AH 331 (943 CE), AH 332 (944 CE), or even AH 333 (944/45 CE). Despite the implication in the medieval sources of a systematic anti-Isma'ili purge, this does not appear to have been the case, as several Isma'ili officials—including Ali Zarrad and Abu Mansur al-Shaghani—remained in their place during Nuh's reign. Furthermore, al-Nasafi's son Mas'ud, known by the sobriquet Dihqan, survived, and continued the Isma'ili missionary effort.

== Teachings and writings ==
Al-Nasafi is considered the first Isma'ili theologian to introduce concepts from Neoplatonic philosophy into Isma'ili cosmological doctrine. As Stern writes, "he founded Isma'ili philosophy by adopting a form of the current Islamic Neoplatonism, and his system remained the standard Isma'ili doctrine in Persia in the fourth/tenth and fifth/eleventh centuries". Sunni sources hold that al-Nasafi was subservient to the Fatimid caliphs, but modern scholars have concluded that he belonged to an independent line of the Isma'ili missionary movement (da'wa) that had come into existence during the late 9th century, before the schism of 899 between pro-Fatimid and 'Qarmatian' Isma'ilis. Al-Nasafi and his followers still subscribed to the original precepts of early Isma'ilism, that centred on the return of the seventh Isma'ili imam, Muhammad ibn Isma'il, as the Mahdi, the Islamic messiah.

In c. 912, al-Nasafi wrote a theological treatise, the Kitab al-Mahsul ('Book of the Yield'). It was widely circulated, but it has not survived, except in extensive quotations in the work of the later da'i, Hamid al-Din al-Kirmani. He espoused the idea that the sharia, the religious law of Islam announced by Muhammad, was suspended with the coming of Muhammad ibn Isma'il, and that the subsequent era was one of lawlessness, which would last until Muhammad ibn Isma'il's imminent return, when the true, inner meaning of religion would be revealed.

These views were denounced as antinomian by more mainstream Isma'ili theologians belonging to the Fatimid-sponsored da'wa, but were popular with the dissident Isma'ili Qarmatians. The Kitab al-Mahsul was thus attacked by al-Nasafi's contemporary da'i, Abu Hatim Ahmad ibn Hamdan al-Razi, in the latter's Kitab al-Islah ('Book of the Correction'); in turn, al-Nasafi's successor, Abu Ya'qub al-Sijistani, wrote the treatise Kitab al-Nusra ('Book of the Support') in defence of al-Nasafi.

Two other manuscripts, held at a private library in India, are also ascribed to al-Nasafi.

== Sources ==
- Barthold, W. (1968). Turkestan Down to the Mongol Invasion (Third ed.). London: Luzac & Co. OCLC 317105274.
- Crone, Patricia; Treadwell, Luke (2003). "A new text on Ismailism at the Samanid court". Texts, documents, and artefacts: Islamic studies in honour of D.S. Richards. Leiden: Brill. pp. 37–67. ISBN 978-9-00412864-4.
- Daftary, Farhad (2007). The Ismāʿı̄lı̄s: Their History and Doctrines (Second ed.). Cambridge: Cambridge University Press. ISBN 978-0-521-61636-2.
- Poonawala, I. (1993). "al-Nasafī". In Bosworth, C. E.; van Donzel, E.; Heinrichs, W. P. & Pellat, Ch. (eds.). The Encyclopaedia of Islam, Second Edition. Volume VII: Mif–Naz. Leiden: E. J. Brill. p. 968. ISBN 978-90-04-09419-2.
- Stern, S. M. (1960). "The Early Ismā'Īlī Missionaries in North-West Persia and in Khurāsān and Transoxania". Bulletin of the School of Oriental and African Studies. 23 (1): 56–90. doi:10.1017/s0041977x00148992. S2CID 162532568.
