= Mahmoud Najmabadi =

Iranian physician (1903–2000))

- محمود نجم‌آبادی
- Born: 1903
- Died: 2000 (aged 96–97)
- Occupation: physician
- Known for: historian in the field of medicine
- Notable work: The first researcher of Iranian medical history

Mahmoud Najmabadi (Persian: محمود نجم‌آبادی; 1903–2000) was an Iranian physician, writer, researcher, and historian in the field of medicine.

== Life ==
He wrote and researched in the field of medical history in Persian and French, and for many years was an official member and vice-president of the French Society of the History of Medicine and the International Society of the History of Medicine in Paris. He received the Order of Knighthood from this country and the First Class Medal of Appreciation from the Iranian government.

He played a major role in introducing the greatest physicians in Iranian history, such as Abu Bakr al-Razi and Avicenna.
