= Nasr II =

Emir of the Samanids from 914 to 943

- Amir of the Samanids
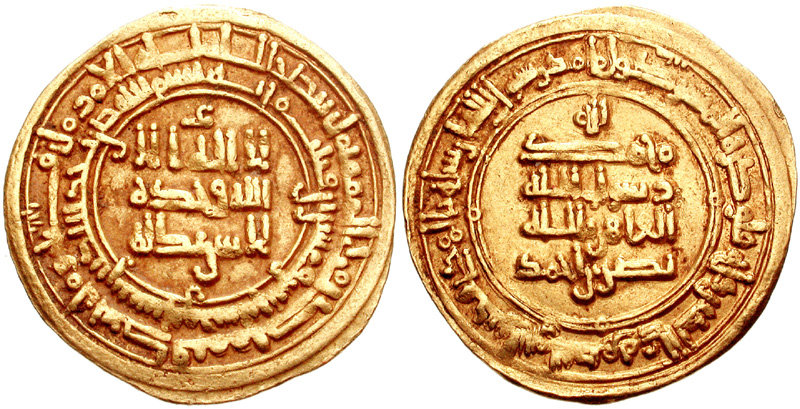
- Coin of Nasr II, minted in Nishapur, 933/4.
- Reign: 23 January 914 – 6 April 943
- Predecessor: Ahmad Samani
- Successor: Nuh I
- Born: 906; Bukhara
- Died: 6 April 943 (aged 38)
- Issue: Nuh I
- House: Samanid dynasty
- Father: Ahmad Samani
- Religion: Isma'ili Shia Islam

Nasr ibn Ahmad or Nasr II (Persian: نصر دوم), nicknamed "the Fortunate", was the ruler (amir) of Transoxiana and Khurasan as the head of the Samanid dynasty from 914 to 943. His reign marked the high point of the Samanid dynasty's fortunes. He was the son of Ahmad ibn Isma’il.

== Biography ==
Map of Khurasan, Transoxiana and Tokharistan

=== Accession and suppression of revolts ===
Nasr was the son of Ahmad ibn Isma'il (r. 907–914), who was assassinated on the night of 23 January 914 by his own guards, due to his favouring Arabic-speaking officials in his court. Nasr thus became emir at the age of eight. Due to his youth, the vizier Abu Abdallah al-Jayhani undertook the regency.

Almost immediately a series of revolts broke out within the state, the most serious being the one led by his great-uncle, Ishaq ibn Ahmad, at Samarkand. Ishaq's sons took part in the rebellion; one son, Abu Salih Mansur, took control of Nishapur and several other cities in Khurasan. Eventually, Ishaq was defeated and surrendered to the general Hamuya ibn Ali, while Abu Salih Mansur died in Nishapur.

Mansur was succeeded by a rebellious general, Husayn ibn Ali al-Marwazi. The general Ahmad ibn Sahl was sent against al-Marwazi, and succeeded in capturing him in 918, only to rise in revolt himself. It was not until late 919 that Ibn Sahl too was defeated by Hamuya ibn Ali. Ibn Sahl was captured during the battle and imprisoned in Bukhara, where he remained until his death in 920. Apart from a brief uprising by Ilyas, a son of Ishaq ibn Ahmad, at Ferghana in 922, the Samanid realm would enjoy a decade of peace thereafter.

Nasr's ascension brought instability to the periphery of the Samanid state. The Abbasids managed to recover Sistan for the last time, while Ray and Tabaristan were taken by the Zaydi Alid Hasan al-Utrush. Despite being unable to recover the provinces, the Samanids employed numerous local Dailamite and Gilite leaders and remained active in the power struggles there. In 921, the Zaydis under the Dailamite general Lili ibn al-Nu'man invaded Khorasan, but were defeated by the Simjurid general Simjur al-Dawati.

=== Middle reign ===
In 922, Abu Abdallah al-Jayhani was removed as prime minister by Nasr; it is not known whether this was on account of his suspected Shi'i beliefs. He was replaced by Abu'l-Fadl al-Bal'ami, who for the most part continued his predecessor's policies. In 928, Asfar ibn Shiruya, a Dailamite military leader who now served the Samanids, conquered Tabaristan and Ray. One year later, Nasr had his commander Muhammad ibn Ilyas imprisoned after angering him. He was, however, shortly freed after receiving the support of al-Bal'ami and was sent on a campaign in Gurgan.

In 930, a revolt by Nasr's brothers broke out. They proclaimed one of their own, Yahya, as emir. Al-Bal'ami managed to quell the rebellion by turning the brothers against each other. Another Dailamite military leader, Makan ibn Kaki, used this opportunity to seize Tabaristan and Gurgan from the Samanids, and even take possession of Nishapur in western Khurasan. He was, however, forced to abandon these regions a year later, due to the threat that Samanids posed. Makan then returned to Tabaristan, where he was defeated by the Ziyarid ruler Mardavij, who managed to conquer the region. He then took refuge in Khorasan, and was appointed by Nasr as the governor of Kerman.

A threat of mobilization by Nasr in 933 prompted Mardavij, who had become the dominant power in the region, to surrender Gurgan and pay tribute to Nasr for his possession of Ray. One year later, Nasr sent Makan against Muhammad ibn Ilyas, who had mutinied against the Samanids. Muhammad attempted to gain the support of the Abbasid general Yaqut but failed, was defeated by Makan and forced to flee. Mardavij was assassinated by his Turkic slaves in 935 and was succeeded by his brother Vushmgir.

Makan, after having heard of Mardavij's assassination at the hands of his own Turkic slaves, immediately left Kirman, secured his appointment as governor of Gurgan from Nasr, and with the support of Samanid troops tried to recover Tabaristan. Vushmgir managed to repel the attack and even conquer Gurgan, but Buyid pressure on his western flank forced him to reach a settlement, recognizing Samanid overlordship and ceding Gurgan to Makan. Samanid armies from that point on were heavily involved in protecting the Ziyarids from the Buyids, who were rising in central Persia. In 938, a son of Abu Abdallah Jayhani, Abu Ali Jayhani, was appointed as prime minister, a post he held until 941.

During the same period, relations between Makan and Vushmgir improved to the point where they declared independence from the Samanids. As a result, in 939, Nasr sent a Samanid army under Abu 'Ali Chaghani which attacked Makan at Gurgan. Following a seven-month siege of his capital, Makan was forced to flee to Ray. The Samanid army pursued him, and in a battle fought on 25 December 940 at Iskhabad near Ray, the Samanid forces were victorious. Makan himself was killed by an arrow, and then beheaded by the victors, who sent his head to Nasr in Bukhara.

=== Conversion to Isma'ilism and death ===
In the 930s, the Samanid court became the object of persistent conversion efforts by the Isma'ili missionary network under Muhammad ibn Ahmad al-Nasafi. These events are described by later and hostile Sunni sources. Traditional accounts are based on ibn al-Nadim's al-Fihrist and the Siyāsatnāmā of Nizam al-Mulk, but al-Tha'alibi's mirror for princes, the Ādāb al-mulūk, published in 1990, also contains much important information. The three sources are often at odds, and it isn't easy to reconcile them.

In c. 937/8 the Isma'ilis succeeded in converting several high-ranking Samanid officials, including, according to Nizam al-Mulk, Nasr's boon companion Abu Bakr al-Nakhshabi, his private secretary Abu Ash'ath, the inspector of the army Abu Mansur al-Shaghani, the chamberlain Aytash, Hasan Malik, governor of Ilaq, and the chief court steward (wakīl khāșș), Ali Zarrad. With their support, Isma'ili missionaries made a convert of Nasr himself, as well as his vizier, Abu Ali Muhammad ibn Muhammad al-Jayhani. According to al-Tha'alabi's account, Nasr was ill and afraid of his impending death, and was thus receptive to the Isma'ili teachings. This ushered a period of Isma'ili dominance at the Samanid court, during which their missionaries preached openly. An Isma'ili secretary, Abu al-Tayyib al-Mus'abi, even appears to have become vizier in 941/42, succeeding al-Jayhani. His tenure was brief, lasting a few months, but his successor was likely also an Isma'ili.

These developments sparked a reaction among the Sunni establishment, particularly the Samanids' Turkic soldiers. According to the story relayed by Nizam al-Mulk, they began to conspire for a coup, even going so far as to offer the throne to one of their commanders. According to Nizam al-Mulk, the Emir's son, Nuh I (r. 943–954), got wind of the conspiracy and persuaded his father to abdicate in his favour. As the 20th-century historian Samuel Miklos Stern noted, "it is difficult to disentangle the legendary elements from the true facts" of Nizam al-Mulk's account, especially since the Fihrist does not mention a military plot, but has Nasr 'repenting' of his conversion, and al-Tha'alibi's account makes no mention of Nasr abdicating in favour of his son. Modern scholars consider that Nasr probably remained on his throne until his death on 6 April 943, and that it is very likely that he died as an Isma'ili. A prolonged illness may have forced him to withdraw from public affairs earlier than that.

Al-Tha'alibi reports that after Nasr's death and the accession of Nuh, the Isma'ilis tried to convert the new emir as well, but failed. According to ibn al-Nadim, Nuh held a public theological debate in which the Isma'ilis were defeated. Al-Tha'alibi, on the other hand, contends that this happened in a private session and that al-Nasafi's subsequent request for a public debate was denied. Shortly after, Nuh launched an anti-Isma'ili pogrom. According to Nizam al-Mulk, the troops spent seven days killing Isma'ilis in Bukhara and its environs in which al-Nasafi and many of his followers perished. Despite the implication of the medieval sources of a systematic purge, this does not appear to have been the case, as several Isma'ili officials—including Ali Zarrad and Abu Mansur al-Shaghani—are attested as serving during Nuh's reign.

== Cultural affairs ==
Nasr's ministers helped turn the Samanid court into a cultural center. Jayhani was known as an author and wrote a geographical work. His interest in the subject caused him to invite geographers from many places to Bukhara. Scientists, astronomers, and others also flocked to the city. Bal’ami likewise was interested in the arts and patronized intellectuals and authors.

== Sources ==
- Barthold, W. (1968). Turkestan Down to the Mongol Invasion (Third ed.). London: Luzac & Co. OCLC 317105274.
- Bosworth, C. E. (1984). "AḤMAD B. SAHL B. HĀŠEM". In Yarshater, Ehsan (ed.). Encyclopædia Iranica. Vol. I/6: Afghanistan–Ahriman. London and New York: Routledge & Kegan Paul. pp. 643–644. ISBN 978-0-71009-095-9.
- Bosworth, C. Edmund (2011). The Ornament of Histories: A History of the Eastern Islamic Lands AD 650–1041: The Persian Text of Abu Sa'id 'Abd Al-Hayy Gardizi. I.B.Tauris. pp. 1–169. ISBN 9781848853539.
- Crone, Patricia; Treadwell, Luke (2003). "A new text on Ismailism at the Samanid court". Texts, documents, and artefacts: Islamic studies in honour of D.S. Richards. Leiden: Brill. pp. 37–67. ISBN 978-9-00412864-4. Archived from the original on 2024-07-09.
- Daftary, Farhad (2007). The Ismāʿı̄lı̄s: Their History and Doctrines (Second ed.). Cambridge: Cambridge University Press. ISBN 978-0-521-61636-2.
- Frye, R. N. (1975). "The Sāmānids". In Frye, Richard N. (ed.). The Cambridge History of Iran: From the Arab Invasion to the Saljuqs. Vol. 4. Cambridge: Cambridge University Press. pp. 136–161. ISBN 0-521-20093-8.
- Madelung, W. (1975). "The Minor Dynasties of Northern Iran". In Frye, Richard N. (ed.). The Cambridge History of Iran: From the Arab Invasion to the Saljuqs. Vol. 4. Cambridge: Cambridge University Press. pp. 198–249. ISBN 0-521-20093-8.
- Stern, S. M. (1960). "The Early Ismā'Īlī Missionaries in North-West Persia and in Khurāsān and Transoxania". Bulletin of the School of Oriental and African Studies. 23 (1): 56–90. doi:10.1017/s0041977x00148992. S2CID 162532568.
- Treadwell, W. L. (1991). The Political History of the Sāmānid State (PhD thesis). University of Oxford.

Preceded by Ahmad ibn Isma'il	Amir of the Samanids; 914–943	Succeeded by Nuh I
