= Abu Abdallah Ahmad ibn Muhammad al-Jayhani =

Abu Abdallah Ahmad ibn Muhammad al-Jayhani was a vizier of the Samanid dynasty from 975/6 to 977.

== Life ==
He was a member of the Jayhani family, that provided several officials to the Samanids. As the sources generally refer to these individuals only by their kunya and nisbah, separating the lives and identities of the family members is difficult. Abu Ali was the son and grandson of viziers: his grandfather, Abu Abdallah Muhammad, and his father, Abu Ali Muhammad, both served as viziers under Emir Nasr II, in 914–922 and 937/8–941/2 respectively.

Abu Abdallah himself was appointed as vizier by Mansur I in 975/6, and remained in office under Nuh II until November/December 977, when he asked to be relieved on account of his advanced age. Like his father, Abu Ahmad is said to have been a convert (or at least sympathetic) to Isma'ilism. He was succeeded by Abu'l-Husain Utbi.

== Sources ==
- Crone, Patricia; Treadwell, Luke (2003). "A new text on Ismailism at the Samanid court". Texts, documents, and artefacts: Islamic studies in honour of D.S. Richards. Leiden: Brill. pp. 37–67. ISBN 978-9-00412864-4. Archived from the original on 2024-07-09.
- Pellat, Ch. (2004). "al-Djayhānī". In Bearman, P. J.; Bianquis, Th.; Bosworth, C. E.; van Donzel, E. & Heinrichs, W. P. (eds.). The Encyclopaedia of Islam, Second Edition. Volume XII: Supplement. Leiden: E. J. Brill. pp. 265–266. doi:10.1163/1573-3912_islam_SIM_8505. ISBN 978-90-04-13974-9.
