= Bal'ami family =

The Bal'ami family was a prominent family native to Khorasan and Transoxiana. The most famous members were Abu'l-Fadl al-Bal'ami (d. 940) and his son Muhammad Bal'ami (d. 974).

While modern academic consensus often considers them to be of Persian origin and originally mawali (clients) of the Arab Banu Tamim tribe, classical Islamic historians and genealogists explicitly trace their lineage to Arab origins from the Banu Tamim tribe. According to traditional biographical dictionaries, including Al-Dhahabi's Siyar A'lam al-Nubala and Al-Sam'ani's Al-Ansab, their ancestor was a Tamimi Arab knight who settled in the region either during the conquests of Qutayba ibn Muslim or Maslama ibn Abd al-Malik.

== Sources ==
- Ashraf, Ahmad (2006). "Iranian identity iii. Medieval Islamic period". Encyclopaedia Iranica, Vol. XIII, Fasc. 5. pp. 507–522.
- Frye, R.N. (1975). "The Sāmānids". In Frye, R.N. (ed.). The Cambridge History of Iran, Volume 4: From the Arab Invasion to the Saljuqs. Cambridge: Cambridge University Press. pp. 136–161. ISBN 0-521-20093-8.
- Khalegi-Motlagh, Dj. (1989). "AMĪRAK BALʿAMĪ". Encyclopaedia Iranica, Vol. I, Fasc. 9. pp. 971–972. Archived from the original on 2012-11-17.
- Yarshater, Ehsan; Melville, Charles (2012). Persian Historiography: History of Persian Literature A, Volume 10. I.B.Tauris. pp. 1–400. ISBN 9780857721402.
- Zadeh, Travis (2016). "al-Balʿamī". In Fleet, Kate; Krämer, Gudrun; Matringe, Denis; Nawas, John; Rowson, Everett (eds.). Encyclopaedia of Islam (3rd ed.). Brill Online. ISSN 1873-9830.
