= Ibn Jazla =

11th century Arab physician and author

Ibn Jazla Abu Ali Yahya ibn Isa ibn Jazla al-Baghdadi أبو علي يحيى بن عيسى بن جزله البغدادي
- Born: Baghdad, Abbasid Caliphate
- Died: c. 1100; Baghdad, Abbasid Caliphate
- Other names: Yahya, ibn Isa, Abu Ali
- Occupations: Physician and Author
- Years active: 1040 – 1100
- Era: Islamic Golden Age (Later Abbasid era)
- Known for: Convert to Islam from Nestorian Christianity
- Children: Ali
- Father: Isa ibn Jazla

Abu Ali Yahya ibn Isa ibn Jazla al-Baghdadi or Ibn Jazlah (Arabic: أبو علي يحيى بن عيسى بن جزله البغدادي), Latinized as Buhahylyha Bingezla, was an 11th-century Arab physician of Baghdad and author of an influential treatise on regimen that was translated into Latin in 1280 AD by the Sicilian Jewish physician Faraj ben Salem.

== Biography ==
Ibn Jazla was born of Christian Nestorian parents at Baghdad. He converted to Islam in 1074. He died in 1100 under the tutelage of Abu `Ali ibn Al-Walid Al-Maghribi.

== Works ==
Tables of the Body for Treatment

His Taqwim al-Abdan fi Tadbir al-Insan (Dispositio corporum de constitutione hominis, Tacuin agritudinum), as the name implies: tables in which diseases are arranged like the stars in astronomical tables, was translated into Latin.

There is a story which says that he was one of the physicians to Charlemagne and that he wrote Tables or Tacuin at the instigation of the latter. This story has no historical foundation unless Ibn Jazla was born two centuries earlier, for indeed, Charlemagne was emperor up to 814. The Tacuin was translated by the Jew Faraj ben Salim and the Latin version was published in 1532. A German translation was published at Strasbourg in 1533 by Hans Schotte.

Ibn Jazla also wrote another work, Al-Minhaj fi Al-Adwiah Al-Murakkabah, (Methodology of Compound Drugs), which was translated by Jambolinus and was known in Latin translation as the Cibis et medicines simplicibus.

A convert to Islam, he wrote works in praise of Islam and criticising Christianity and Judaism.

- Tacvini Aegritvdinvm et Morborum ferme omnium Corporis humani : cum curis eorundem / Bvhahylyha Byngezla Autore. [Trans.: Farag Ben Salim]. - Argentorati : Schottus, 1532. digital
- Tacuini sanitatis Elluchasem Elimithar : de sex rebus non naturalibus earum naturis operationibus ... recens exarati / Elluchasem Elimithar. - Argentorati : Schott, 1531. digital
