= Al-Hawi =

Medical book by Muhammad ibn Zakarīya al Rāzi

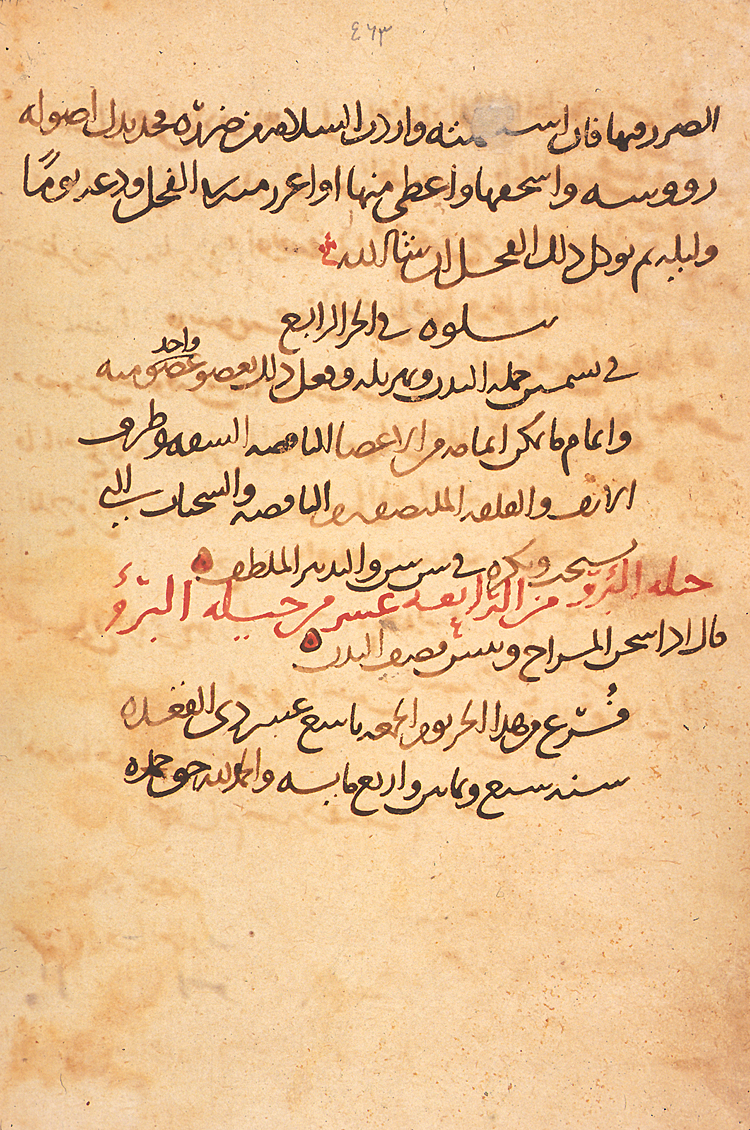
- The oldest existing manuscript from Rhazes is this page of Al-Hawi, dated 1094CE, kept at the National Library of Medicine in Bethesda, Maryland.
- Author: Rhazes
- Publication date: 10th century

Kitab al-Hawi or Al-Hawi or Kitāb al-Ḥāwī fī al-ṭibb translated as The Comprehensive Book on Medicine is an extensive medical encyclopedia authored by the Persian polymath Abu Bakr Muhammad ibn Zakariya al-Razi (865–925), commonly known in the West as Rhazes in the 10th century. This monumental work is a compendium of Greek, Syrian, and early Arabic medical knowledge, as well as some Indian medical practices.

It was first translated into Latin in 1279 under the title Continens by Faraj ben Salim, a physician of Sicilian-Jewish origin employed by Charles of Anjou.

The oldest partial remaining copy of this work belongs to the National Library of Medicine in Bethesda, Maryland dated 1094 CE.

== Historical context and composition ==
The Kitab al-Hawi was composed around the year 900 and spans 22 volumes. It was later published by the Dairat'l-Macarif-il-Osmania (Osmania Oriental Publications Bureau) in Hyderabad, India.

== Contents and significance ==
The book covers a wide range of medical topics, including theoretical and practical medicine. Al-Razi's approach was notably comprehensive, as he not only included medical knowledge from Greek and Syrian sources but also incorporated insights from Indian medical traditions.

Al-Razi frequently recommended various treatments, including those that might be considered magical remedies by today's standards. For instance, he addressed conditions such as quartan fever and recommended specific practices for their treatment.

== Legacy ==
The Kitab al-Hawi had a profound influence on the development of medical knowledge in the medieval Islamic world and subsequently in Europe. It was translated into Latin in the 12th century and became one of the main sources of medical knowledge in medieval Europe.

== See also ==
- Medicine in the medieval Islamic world
- Islamic Golden Age
- Graeco-Arabic translation movement
- Unani medicine#Islamic Golden Age (786–1258)
