= Abu Ali Bal'ami =

10th-century Persian historian and Samanid vizier

Abu Ali Muhammad Bal'ami (Persian: ابو علی محمد, died 992/997), also called Amirak Bal'ami (امیرک بلعمی) and Bal'ami-i Kuchak (بلعمی کوچک, "Bal'ami the Younger"), was a 10th-century Persian historian, writer, and vizier to the Samanids. He was from the influential Bal'ami family.

== Biography ==
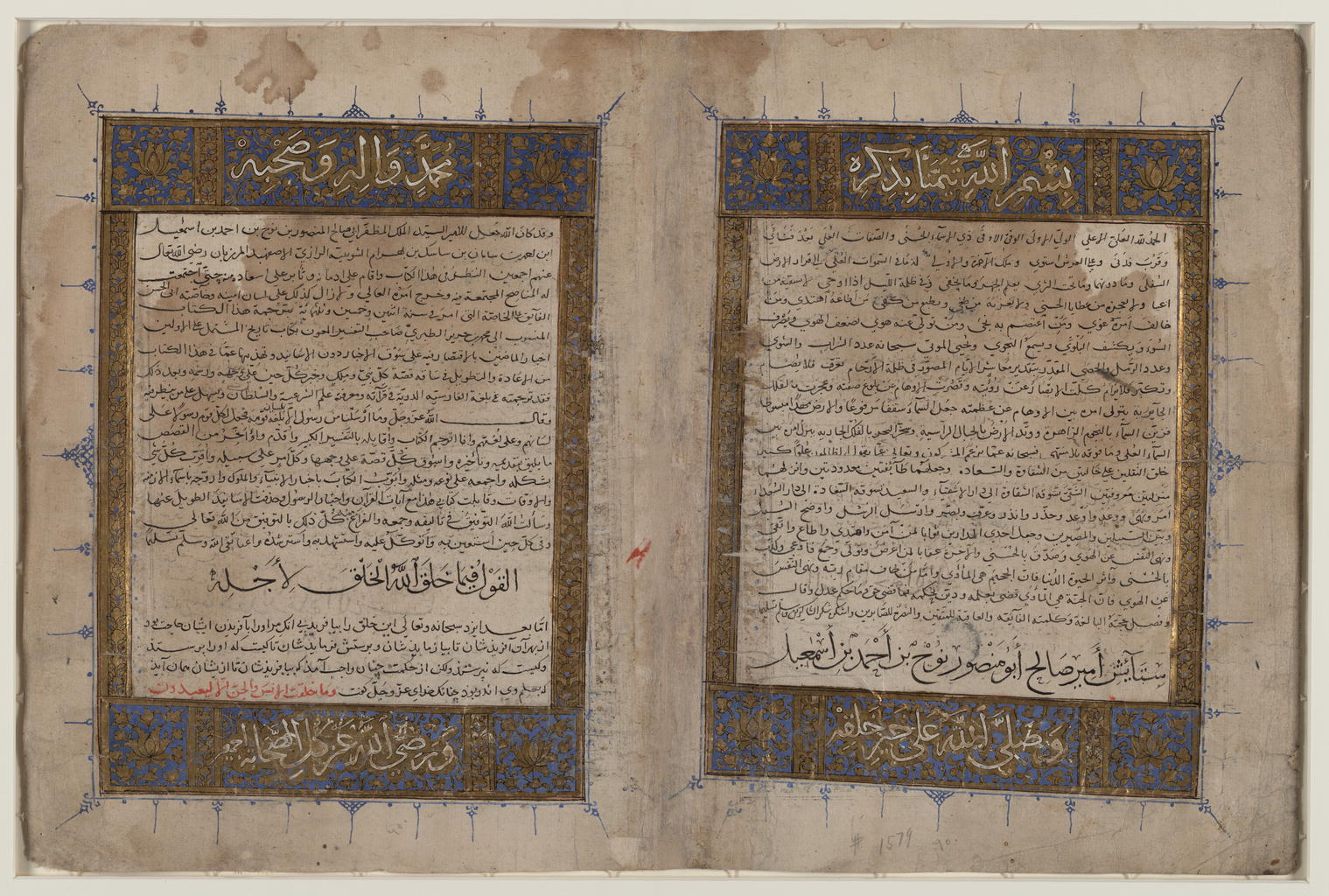
The Tarikh-i Bal'ami, a Persian translation of al-Tabari's History of the Prophets and Kings by Muhammad Bal'ami (first and second pages are in arabic, but next are in persian)

He was born in Lashjerd in the district of Merv, then part of the Samanid Empire. He was the son of Abu'l-Fadl al-Bal'ami (also called Bal'ami-i Buzurg; "Bal'ami the Elder"). Muhammad Bal'ami was appointed vizier late in the reign of Abd al-Malik I (r. 954–961) and kept holding the office under Abd al-Malik's successor, Mansur I (r. 961–976). According to Gardizi, Bal'ami died in March 974 while serving in office, but according to the Persian historian al-Utbi, he was later from removed the vizierate office, and was reappointed later as the vizier of Nuh II (r. 976–997), but chose to retire in 992, dying in an unknown date before 997.

== Work ==
Bal'ami most famous work is Tarikhnama, a historical text that spans a period beginning with the dawn of creation through to the Islamic age. The book was translated into Turkish and Arabic and remained in circulation for a thousand years. It is among the most influential books of Islamic historical literature and contains supplementary material, some of which is found nowhere else. It helped revive both the idea of the Iranian monarchy and its memory.

Though Bal'ami claims the Tarikhnama is a translation of al-Tabari's History of the Prophets and Kings, it is actually an independent work. Bal'ami states several times in the book that he has corrected al-Tabari's version. Contrary to al-Tabari, Bal'ami's version is presented from a Persian (mainly Khorasanian) point of view. Having been written in 963, the Tarikh-i Bal'ami is the oldest New Persian prose work after the preface of the Shahnama-yi Abu Mansuri by Abu Mansur Muhammad.

The 12th-century poet Nizami Aruzi makes mention of a book composed by Bal'ami named Tawqi'at, and two lines by Bal'ami are cited in the Farhang-e Jahangiri by Jamal al-Din Hosayn Enju Shirazi. However, it is not known if this refers to Bal'ami or his father, Bal'ami the Elder.
