= Giunta =

Giunta is an Italian surname. Notable people with the surname include:

- Giunta (printers), Florentine family of printers, also spelled Giunti
- Ana María Giunta (1943– 2015), Argentine actress
- Andrea Giunta (born 1960), Argentine art historian, professor, researcher, and curator
- Blas Giunta (born 1963), Argentine footballer and manager
- Edvige Giunta (born 1959), Sicilian-American author and educator
- Francesco Giunta (1887–1971), Italian Fascist politician
- Giulio Giunta (1935–2010), Italian modern pentathlete
- John Giunta (c. 192-1970), illustrator of comic books from the 1940s through the 1960s
- Joseph Giunta (mobster) (1887-1929), Italian-American mobster with the Chicago Outfit
- Giunta Pisano (fl. 1202–1258, Italian painter
- Giuseppe Giunta (born 1973), Italian wrestler
- Joseph Giunta (1911–2001), Canadian painter
- Lucantonio Giunti (or Giunta; 1457–1538), Florentine book publisher and printer, active in Venice from 1489
- Peter Giunta (born 1956), American football coach
- Peter Giunta (political operative) (born 1993 or 1994), American political operative in New York
- Salvatore Giunta (born 1985), American Medal of Honor recipient
- Salvatore Giunta (footballer) (born 1967), Italian footballer

== Fictional ==
- Furio Giunta, played by Federico Castelluccio, a fictional character on the HBO TV series The Sopranos
