= Abu Ali Muhammad ibn Muhammad al-Jayhani =

Persian vizier of the Samanid Empire (died 942)

Abu Ali Muhammad ibn Muhammad al-Jayhani (died 942) was a vizier of the Samanid dynasty.

== Life ==
He was a member of the Jayhani family, that provided several officials to the Samanids. As the sources generally refer to these individuals only by their kunya and nisbah, separating the lives and identities of the family members is difficult. Abu Ali was apparently the son of Abu Abdallah Muhammad ibn Ahmad al-Jayhani, who served as vizier to Emir Nasr II in 914–922.

Abu Ali himself served as vizier to Nasr II in 937/8 until 941/2 or slightly before that. Like his master, Abu Ali converted to Isma'ilism at that time. He died in AH 330 (941/2 CE), and was succeeded by a fervent Isma'ili partisan, Abu al-Tayyib al-Mus'abi. It may be, however, that al-Mus'abi had already succeeded Abu Ali before the latter's death. According to some sources, Abu Ali patronized the Shi'a gnostic al-Kayyal.

Abu Ali's son, Abu Abdallah, also served as vizier in 975/6–977.

== Sources ==
- Crone, Patricia; Treadwell, Luke (2003). "A new text on Ismailism at the Samanid court". Texts, documents, and artefacts: Islamic studies in honour of D.S. Richards. Leiden: Brill. pp. 37–67. ISBN 978-9-00412864-4. Archived from the original on 2024-07-09.
- Daftary, Farhad (2007). The Ismāʿı̄lı̄s: Their History and Doctrines (Second ed.). Cambridge: Cambridge University Press. ISBN 978-0-521-61636-2.
- Pellat, Ch. (2004). "al-Djayhānī". In Bearman, P. J.; Bianquis, Th.; Bosworth, C. E.; van Donzel, E. & Heinrichs, W. P. (eds.). The Encyclopaedia of Islam, Second Edition. Volume XII: Supplement. Leiden: E. J. Brill. pp. 265–266. doi:10.1163/1573-3912_islam_SIM_8505. ISBN 978-90-04-13974-9.

Preceded by Abu'l-Fadl al-Bal'ami	Vizier of the Samanid Empire; 937/8–941/2	Succeeded by Abu al-Tayyib al-Mus'abi
