= Simjur al-Dawati =

Simjur al-Dawati was a 10th-century Turkic general who served the Samanids. He was the founder of the Simjurid family which would play an important role in the Samanid Empire.

== Biography ==
Simjur was a ghulam of Turkic origin and a victim of the Samanid slave trade. During his early career he served as the tax collector of Herat. In 911, the Samanid ruler Ahmad Samani, ordered an invasion of Saffarid Sistan; Simjur along with other Samanid generals quickly subdued parts of Sistan and then captured its capital, Zarang from the Saffarid ruler Al-Mu'addal. During the conquest of Sistan, a Caliphal rebel of Turkic origin named Sebük-eri, was captured and sent to the Abbasid caliph in Baghdad, while Abu Salih Mansur, the cousin of Ahmad Samani, was appointed as governor of Sistan.

However, this was not the end of the conflicts in Sistan; Mansur's oppressive taxation policies sparked a revolt in Sistan one year later in 912, led by the Khariji Muhammad ibn Hurmuz, who was a supporter of the Saffarid Amr ibn Ya'qub. Mansur was then taken prisoner until the rebellion was crushed by an Samanid army under Husain ibn 'Ali Marvarrudhi in 913. 'Amr was sent to Samarkand, while the other rebel leaders were killed. Simjur al-Dawati then replaced Mansur as governor of Sistan.

Simjur seems to have later taken part in a ghulam conspiracy against Ahmad Samani which ended in a failure. During the reign of Ahmad's son Nasr II, the Zaydids invaded Greater Khorasan, but were repulsed by Simjur. During the later life of Simjur, he served as governor of various provinces, including the newly captured province of Ray. He died at an unknown date during the reign of Nasr II and had a son named Ibrahim ibn Simjur.

== Sources ==
- Bosworth, Clifford Edmund. The New Islamic Dynasties: A Chronological and Genealogical Manual. Great Britain: Columbia University Press, 1996. ISBN 0-231-10714-5
- Frye, R.N. (1975). "The Sāmānids". In Frye, R.N. (ed.). The Cambridge History of Iran, Volume 4: From the Arab Invasion to the Saljuqs. Cambridge: Cambridge University Press. pp. 136–161. ISBN 0-521-20093-8.
- Treadwell, Luke. "Simjurids." Encyclopaedia Iranica. Ed. Ehsan Yarshater. Columbia University. Retrieved 8 May 2012.

Preceded by Abu Salih Mansur	Governor of Sistan; 913–???	Unknown
Unknown	Governor of Ray; 926/7–???	Unknown
