= Ahmad Samani =

Amir of the Samanids from 907 to 914

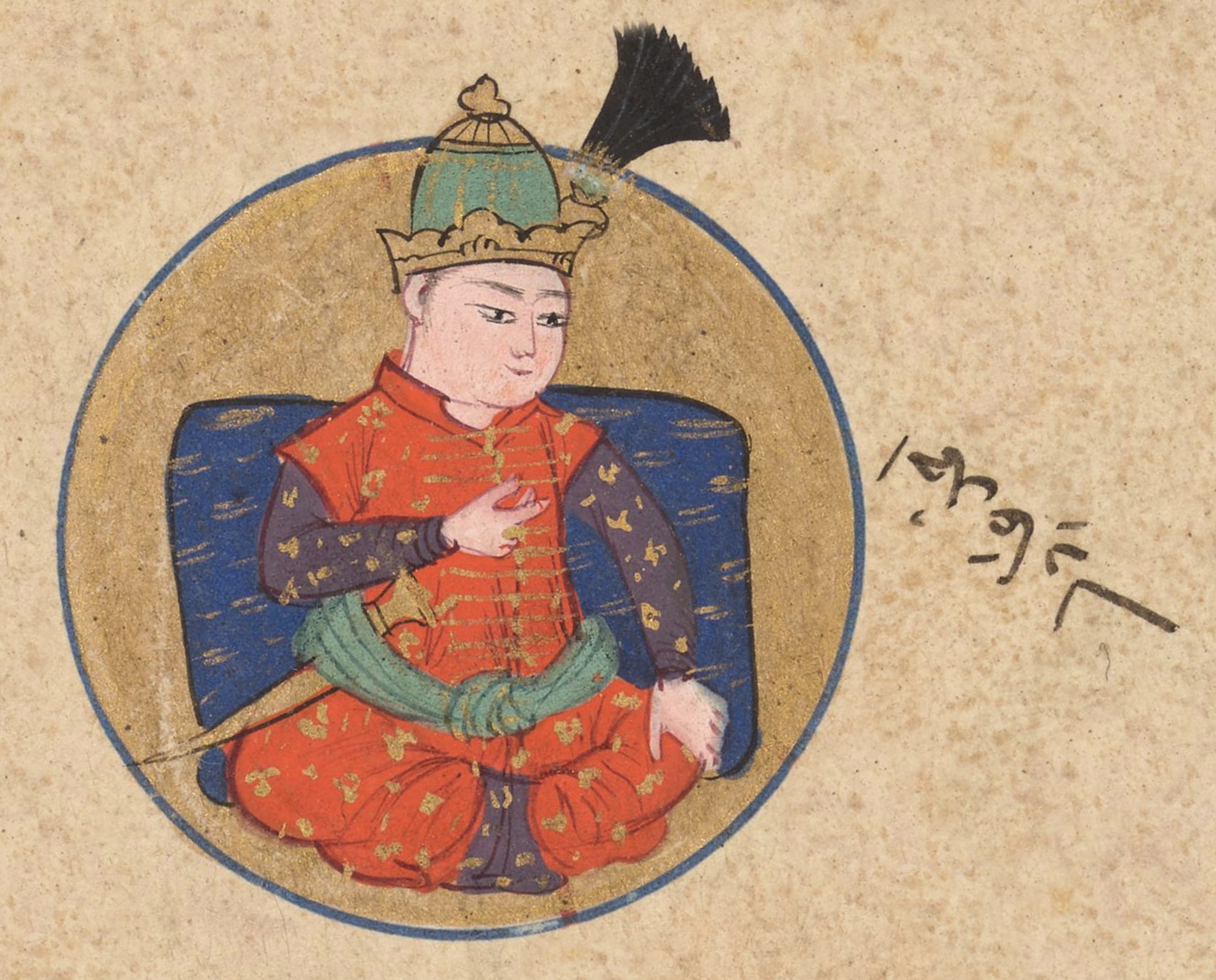
- Ahmad Samani from the genealogical tree of the Zübdet-üt Tevarih ("Cream of Histories"), dated 1598

Amir of the Samanids
- Reign: 907–914
- Predecessor: Ismail Samani
- Successor: Nasr II
- Died: 24 January 914
- Issue: Nasr II; Ibrahim ibn Ahmad
- Dynasty: Samanid
- Father: Ismail Samani
- Religion: Sunni Islam

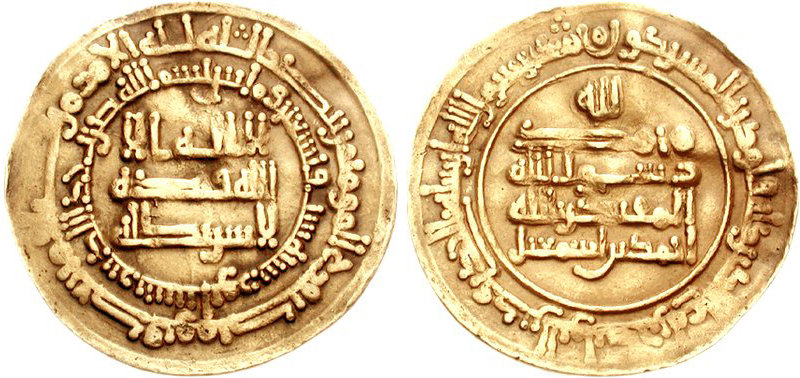
Coin of Ahmad Samani

Ahmad ibn Ismail (Persian: احمد سامانی; died 24 January 914) was amir of the Samanids (907–914). He was the son of Ismail Samani. He was known as the "Martyred Amir".

== Biography ==
Ahmad is first mentioned in the early 900s, when he was appointed as the governor of Gurgan. However, Ahmad was soon removed from the governorship because of his failure to wage war against the Justanids of Daylam.

Ahmad became amir upon his father's death in late 907. Some time afterwards, he was granted the rights to Sistan, the heart of the Saffarid realm, by Caliph al-Muqtadir. The Saffarids' infighting made the job much easier. Ahmad's army travelled from Farah to Bust, where they met little resistance. At the same time, Ahmad's Turkic general Simjur al-Dawati received the surrender of Zarang from al-Mu'addal. The conquest of the Saffarids complete (911), Ahmad appointed his cousin Abu Salih Mansur as governor of Sistan in the following year. The Samanids also captured a Caliphal rebel, Turkic warlord Sebük-eri, and sent him to Baghdad.

Mansur's oppressive taxation policies sparked a revolt in Sistan within a year of his appointment. The garrison at Zaranj was destroyed, and Abu Salih Mansur was captured. Amr ibn Ya'qub, a Saffarid, was installed, first as a puppet for the leader of the rebellion, then as amir in his own right. A Samanid army, however, under the control of Husain ibn 'Ali Marvarrudhi restored Samanid control to the region. 'Amr was sent to Samarkand; the other rebel leaders were killed.

Simjur al-Dawati was then installed as governor of Sistan. Tabaristan and Gurgan, however, soon revolted against Samanid authority as well, and Ahmad was killed before he could deal with them. He was decapitated while sleeping in his tent near Bukhara by some of his Turkic slaves (24 January 914). After his death, he was brought to Bukhara and buried in Naukanda. Some of his slaves who had killed the Amir were caught and executed, while others fled to Turkestan. He was designated as the "Martyred Amir".

Ahmad may have become unpopular among his subjects for his order to change the language of the court from Persian to Arabic; this order was soon rescinded. He was succeeded by his young son Nasr II.

== Notes ==
Preceded by Ismail Samani	Amir of the Samanids; 907–914	Succeeded by Nasr II
