= Abu Bakr al-Razi =

10th-century Iranian physician and polymath

Abū Bakr al-Rāzī
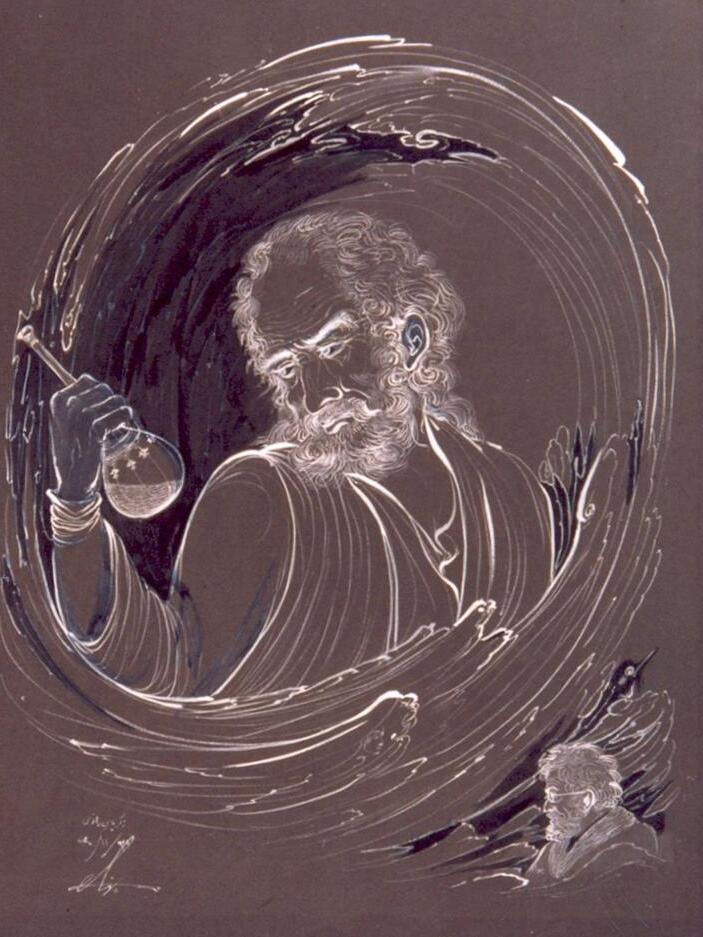
- Portrait by Hossein Behzad, 1962
- Born: 864 or 865 CE; 250 or 251 AH; Ray (Iran)
- Died: 925 (aged 60–61) CE or 935 (aged 70–71) CE; 313 or 323 AH; Ray (Iran)

Philosophical work
- Era: Islamic Golden Age
- Language: Arabic (writings)
- Main interests: Medicine, philosophy, alchemy, criticism of religion
- Notable ideas: Pioneer of obstetrics and ophthalmology, author of the first book on pediatrics, making leading contributions in inorganic and organic chemistry, also the author of several philosophical works

Abū Bakr al-Rāzī, also known as Rhazes (Note: His name was rendered in Latin as either Rhazes or Rhasis; Chaucer used the form Rasis. In modern academic literature he is also often referred to as Razi.) (full name: أبو بکر محمد بن زکریاء الرازي, Abū Bakr Muḥammad ibn Zakariyyāʾ al-Rāzī, (Note: For the spelling of his Arabic name, see for example Kraus 1939. Sometimes it is also spelled زکریا (Zakariyyā) rather than زکریاء (Zakariyyāʾ), as for example in Dānish-pazhūh 1964, p. 1 of the edition, or in Mohaghegh 1993, p. 5. In modern Persian his name is rendered as ابوبکر محمدبن زکریا رازی (see Dānish-pazhūh 1964, p. 1 of the introduction), though instead of زکریا one may also find زکریای (see Mohaghegh 1993, p. 18).) 864 or 865 – 925 or 935 CE (Note: For his date of birth, Kraus & Pines 1913–1936 give 864 CE / 250 AH (Goodman 1960–2007 gives 854 CE / 250 AH, but this is a typo), while Richter-Bernburg 2003 and Adamson 2021a give 865 CE / 251 AH. For his date of death as 925 or 935 CE / 313 or 323 AH, see Goodman 1960–2007; some sources only give 925 CE / 313 AH (Walker 1998; Richter-Bernburg 2003; Adamson 2021a).)), was a Persian Muslim physician, philosopher, alchemist, and pre-eminent medical writer of the Islamic Golden Age, widely regarded as one of the most important figures in the history of medicine. In addition to medicine and philosophy, he wrote on logic, astronomy, and grammar.

Al-Rāzī studied medicine in Baghdad, where he spent much of his career, and became a successful physician who served as chief physician of hospitals in Baghdad and Ray. He was an early proponent of experimental medicine and made numerous medical advances through observation and discovery. As a teacher he attracted students of differing backgrounds and interests and was reputed to be compassionate and devoted to patients irrespective of whether they were rich or poor. Together with Thābit ibn Qurra (836–901), he was among the first physicians to distinguish clinically between smallpox and measles. He recognized the complexity of the causes of disease and the importance of the patient's own disposition or will in recovery, observing that this influence could be sufficiently strong for even charlatans sometimes to bring about apparent cures, while also acknowledging the limitations of physicians themselves.

A prolific author, al-Rāzī is credited with more than 200 works or manuscripts. Among his major medical writings were Kitāb al-Manṣūrī, translated into Latin as Liber Almansoris, Kitāb al-Mulūkī (Liber Regius), and the extensive medical encyclopaedia Ḥāwī (Continens), which was completed by his pupils after his death. The latter was first translated into Latin in 1279 and subsequently became one of the early printed medical books, being printed five times between 1488 and 1542. Through Latin translation, his writings exerted a profound influence on medieval European medicine and medical education. Portions of Al-Manṣūrī, including sections on surgery and general therapeutics, entered the curricula of Western universities. Edward Granville Browne regarded him as "probably the greatest and most original of all the Muslim physicians, and one of the most prolific as an author". He has additionally been described as the father of pediatrics and as a pioneer in obstetrics and ophthalmology.

In philosophy, al-Rāzī accorded a particularly high status to reason, regarding it as a divine gift through which human beings could attain the benefits available to them in this life and the next. He was also critical of religion, particularly the concepts of prophethood and revelation, and a now lost work on prophecy reportedly maintained that reason occupied a higher rank than prophecy. His religio-philosophical doctrines, including a belief in five "eternal principles", survive only fragmentarily and are known largely through reports by writers who were often hostile to him. Toward the end of his life he became blind and declined treatment, explaining that after so long a life he had already seen enough of the world.

== Biography ==
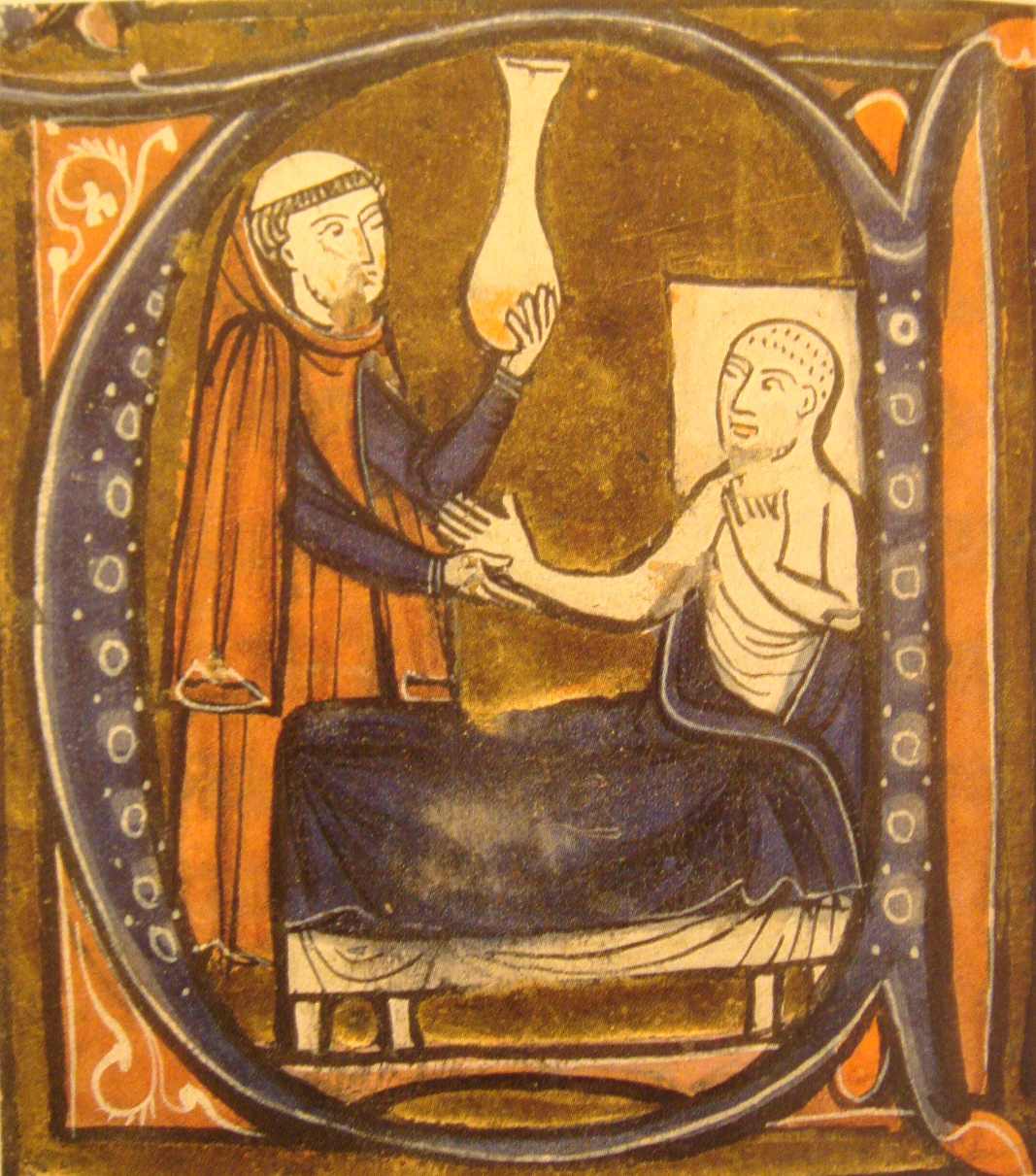
Depiction of al-Razi in a 13th-century manuscript of a work by Gerard of Cremona

Al-Razi was born in the city of Ray (modern Rey, also the origin of his name "al-Razi"), into a family of Persian stock and was a native speaker of the Persian language. Ray was situated on the Great Silk Road that for centuries facilitated trade and cultural exchanges between East and West. It is located on the southern slopes of the Alborz mountain range situated near Tehran, Iran.

In his youth, al-Razi moved to Baghdad where he studied and practiced at the local bimaristan (hospital). Later, he was invited back to Rey by Mansur ibn Ishaq, then the governor of Ray, and became a bimaristan's head. He dedicated two books on medicine to Mansur ibn Ishaq, The Spiritual Physic and Al-Mansūrī on Medicine. Because of his newly acquired popularity as physician, al-Razi was invited to Baghdad where he assumed the responsibilities of a director in a new hospital named after its founder al-Muʿtaḍid (d. 902 CE). Under the reign of Al-Mutadid's son, Al-Muktafi (r. 902–908) al-Razi was commissioned to build a new hospital, which should be the largest of the Abbasid Caliphate. To pick the future hospital's location, al-Razi adopted what is nowadays known as an evidence-based approach suggesting having fresh meat hung in various places throughout the city and to build the hospital where meat took longest to rot.

He spent the last years of his life in his native Rey suffering from glaucoma. His eye affliction started with cataracts and ended in total blindness. The cause of his blindness is uncertain. One account mentioned by Ibn Juljul attributed the cause to a blow to his head by his patron, Mansur ibn Ishaq, for failing to provide proof for his alchemy theories; while Abulfaraj and Casiri claimed that the cause was a diet of beans only. Allegedly, he was approached by a physician offering an ointment to cure his blindness. Al-Razi then asked him how many layers does the eye contain and when he was unable to receive an answer, he declined the treatment stating "my eyes will not be treated by one who does not know the basics of its anatomy".

The lectures of al-Razi attracted many students. As Ibn al-Nadim relates in Fihrist, al-Razi was considered a shaikh, an honorary title given to one entitled to teach and surrounded by several circles of students. When someone raised a question, it was passed on to students of the 'first circle'; if they did not know the answer, it was passed on to those of the 'second circle', and so on. When all students would fail to answer, al-Razi himself would consider the query. Al-Razi was a generous person by nature, with a considerate attitude towards his patients. He was charitable to the poor, treated them without payment in any form, and wrote for them a treatise Man La Yaḥḍuruhu al-Ṭabīb, or Who Has No Physician to Attend Him, with medical advice. One former pupil from Tabaristan came to look after him, but as al-Biruni wrote, al-Razi rewarded him for his intentions and sent him back home, proclaiming that his final days were approaching. According to Biruni, al-Razi died in Rey in 925 at sixty years of age. Biruni, who considered al-Razi his mentor, among the first penned a short biography of al-Razi including a bibliography of his numerous works.

Ibn al-Nadim recorded an account by al-Razi of a Chinese student who copied down all of Galen's works in Chinese as al-Razi read them to him out loud after the student learned fluent Arabic in 5 months and attended al-Razi's lectures.

After his death, his fame spread beyond the Middle East to Medieval Europe, and lived on. In an undated catalog of the library at Peterborough Abbey, most likely from the 14th century, al-Razi is listed as a part author of ten books on medicine.

== Contributions to medicine ==
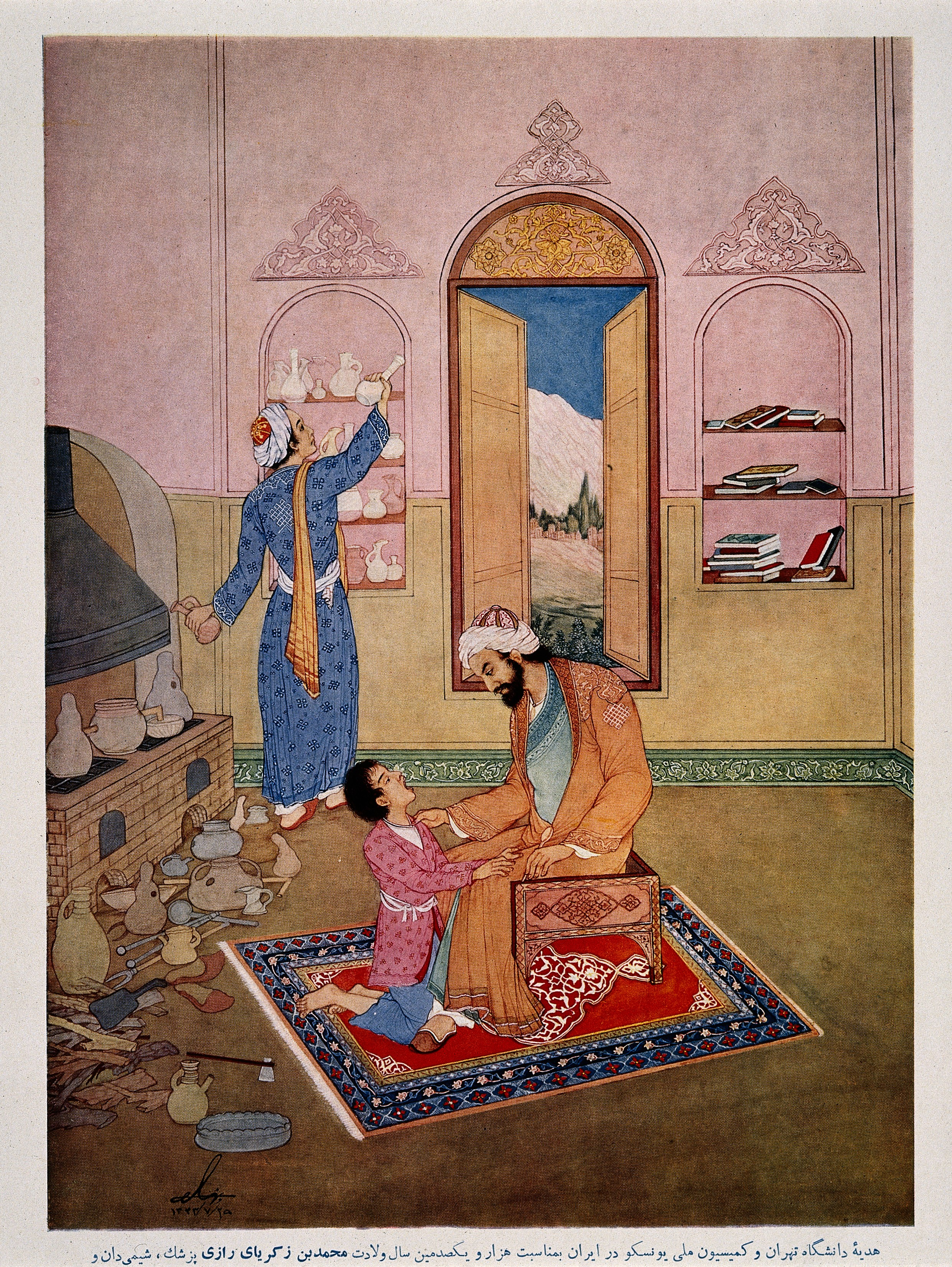
al-Razi examining a patient (miniature painting by Hossein Behzad, 1894–1968)

=== Psychology and psychotherapy ===
Al-Razi was one of the world's first great medical experts. He is considered the father of psychology and psychotherapy.

=== Smallpox vs. measles ===
Al-Razi's book al-Judari wa l-ḥaṣba "On Smallpox and Measles", is, along with a book of the same name by Thabit ibn Qurra (836–901), among the earliest extant books describing smallpox and measles as distinct diseases. Smallpox was not known in ancient Greek medicine. It was likely differentiated from measles and other similar diseases by authors in late antiquity writing in Medieval Greek and Syriac, whose works were known to Thabit and al-Razi.

Al-Razi's work was translated into Syriac and then into Greek. It became known in Europe through this translation, as well as Latin translations based on the Greek text, and was later translated into several European languages. Neither the date nor the author of the Syriac and Greek versions is known, but the Greek was created at the request of one of the Byzantine emperors. The anonymous Greek translator of Razi's work used the term λοιμική (loimikē) to describe smallpox, since the ancient Greek language had no word that precisely conveyed this meaning.

=== Meningitis ===
Al-Razi compared the outcome of patients with meningitis treated with blood-letting with the outcome of those treated without it to see if blood-letting could help.

=== Pharmacy ===
Al-Razi contributed in many ways to the early practice of pharmacy by compiling texts, in which he introduces the use of "mercurial ointments" and his development of apparatus such as mortars, flasks, spatulas and phials, which were used in pharmacies until the early twentieth century.

=== Ethics of medicine ===
On a professional level, al-Razi introduced many practical, progressive, medical and psychological ideas. He attacked charlatans and fake doctors who roamed the cities and countryside selling their nostrums and "cures". At the same time, he warned that even highly educated doctors did not have the answers to all medical problems and could not cure all sicknesses or heal every disease, which was humanly speaking impossible. To become more useful in their services and truer to their calling, al-Razi advised practitioners to keep up with advanced knowledge by continually studying medical books and exposing themselves to new information. He made a distinction between curable and incurable diseases. Pertaining to the latter, he commented that in the case of advanced cases of cancer and leprosy the physician should not be blamed when he could not cure them. To add a humorous note, al-Razi felt great pity for physicians who took care for the well-being of princes, nobility, and women, because they did not obey the doctor's orders to restrict their diet or get medical treatment, thus making it most difficult being their physician.

He also wrote the following on medical ethics:

The doctor's aim is to do good, even to our enemies, so much more to our friends, and my profession forbids us to do harm to our kindred, as it is instituted for the benefit and welfare of the human race, and God imposed on physicians the oath not to compose mortiferous remedies.

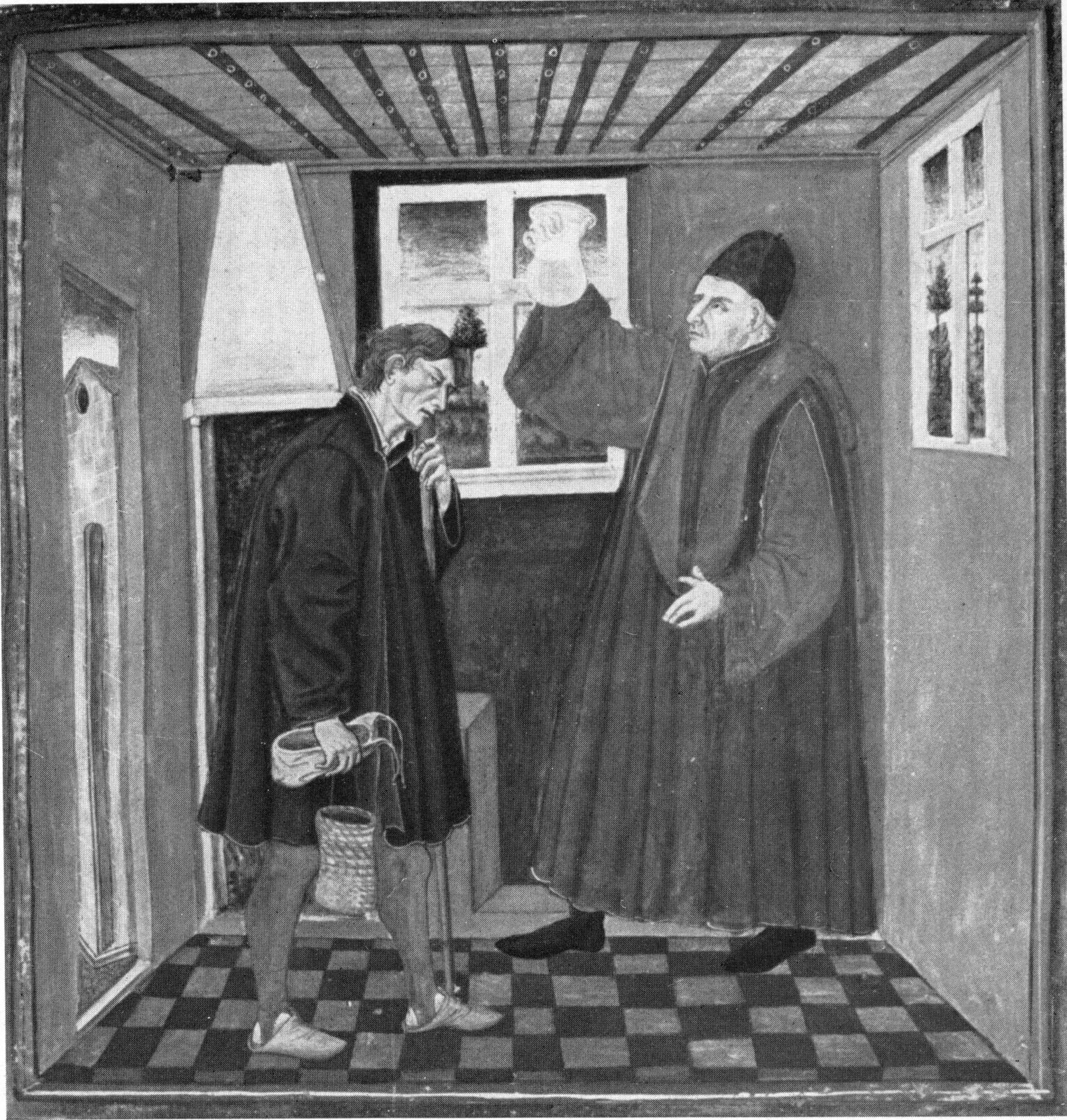
Doctor performing uroscopy (from a Latin translation of a work by al-Razi, 1466)

=== Books and articles on medicine ===
==== Al-Hawi ====
Arabic: الحاوي, romanized: al-Hāwi, lit. 'The Comprehensive [Book on Medicine]' This 23-volume medical textbook sets the foundation of gynecology, obstetrics, oncology and chemotherapy, and ophthalmic surgery. It also contains considerations and criticism on Aristotle and Plato and expresses innovative views on many subjects. Because of this book alone, many scholars consider al-Razi the greatest medical doctor of the Middle Ages.

Al-Hawi is not a formal medical encyclopedia but a posthumous compilation of al-Razi's working notebooks, which included knowledge gathered from other books as well as original observations on diseases and therapies based on his own clinical experience. It is significant since it contains a monograph on smallpox, one of the earliest known. It was translated into Latin in 1279 by Faraj ben Salim, a physician of Sicilian-Jewish origin employed by Charles of Anjou, and after which it had a considerable influence in Europe.

Al-Hawi also criticized the views of Galen after al-Razi had observed many clinical cases that did not follow Galen's descriptions of fevers. For example, he stated that Galen's descriptions of urinary ailments were inaccurate as he had only seen three cases, while al-Razi had studied hundreds of such cases in hospitals of Baghdad and Rey.

==== For One Who Has No Physician to Attend Him (Man la Yahduruhu Al-Tabib) (من لا يحضره الطبيب) ====
Al-Razi was possibly the first Persian doctor to deliberately write a home medical manual (remedial) directed at the general public. He dedicated it to the poor, the traveller, and the ordinary citizen who could consult it to treat common ailments when a doctor was unavailable. This book is of special interest to the history of pharmacy since similar books were very popular until the 20th century. Al-Razi described in its 36 chapters diets and drug components that can be found in either an apothecary, a marketplace, in well-equipped kitchens, or military camps. Thus, every intelligent person could follow its instructions and prepare the proper recipes with good results.

Some of the illnesses treated were headaches, colds, coughing, melancholy and diseases of the eye, ear, and stomach. For example, he prescribed for a feverish headache: "2 parts of duhn (oily extract) of rose, to be mixed with 1 part of vinegar, in which a piece of linen cloth is dipped and compressed on the forehead". He recommended as a laxative, "7 drams of dried violet flowers with 20 pears, macerated and well mixed, then strained. Add to this filtrate 20 drams of sugar for a drink." In cases of melancholy, he invariably recommended prescriptions, which included either poppies or its juice (opium), Cuscuta epithymum (clover dodder) or both. For an eye-remedy, he advised myrrh, saffron, and frankincense, 2 drams each, to be mixed with 1 dram of yellow arsenic formed into tablets. Each tablet was to be dissolved in sufficient coriander water and used as eye drops.

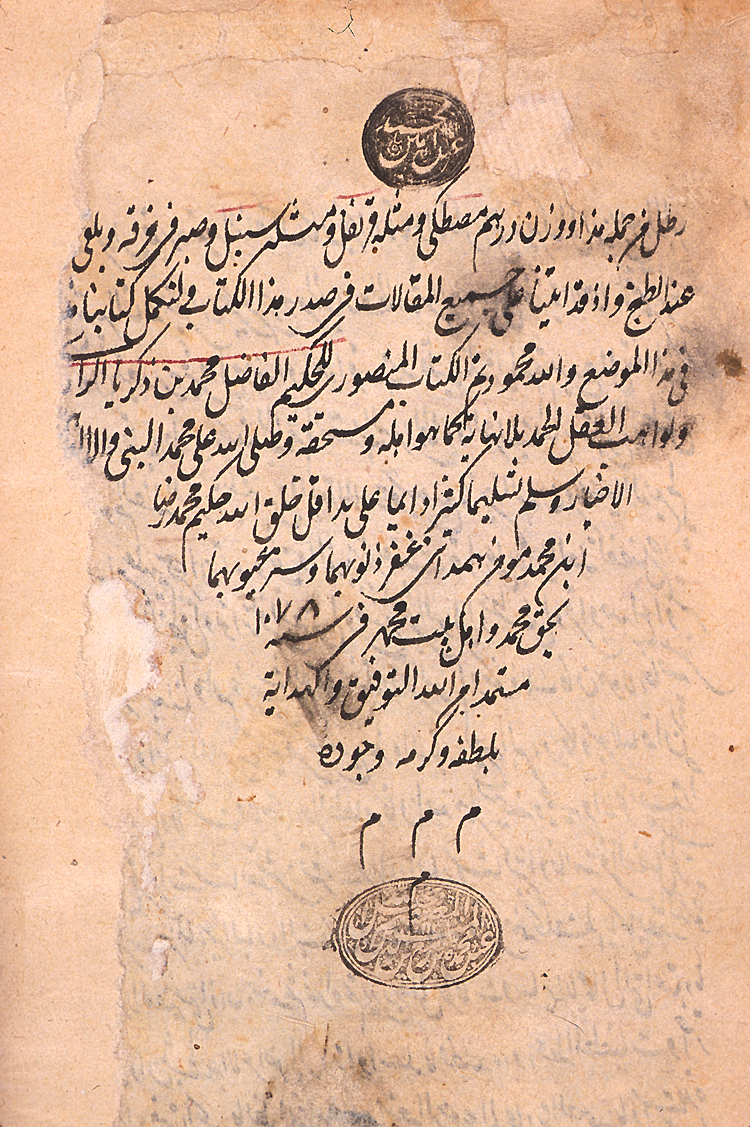
Colophon of al-Razi's Book of Medicine for Mansur

Book for al-Mansur (Kitāb al-Manṣūrī)

Al-Razi dedicated this work to his patron Abū Ṣāliḥ al-Manṣūr, the Samanid governor of Ray. It was translated into Latin by Gerard of Cremona around 1180. A Latin translation of it was edited in the 16th century by the Dutch anatomist and physician Andreas Vesalius.

==== Doubts about Galen (al-Shukūk ʿalā Jalīnūs) ====
In his book Doubts about Galen, al-Razi rejects several claims made by the Greek physician, as far as the alleged superiority of the Greek language and many of his cosmological and medical views. He links medicine with philosophy, and states that sound practice demands independent thinking. He reports that Galen's descriptions do not agree with his own clinical observations regarding the run of a fever. And in some cases he finds that his clinical experience exceeds Galen's.

He criticized Galen's theory that the body possessed four separate "humors" whose balance is the key to health and a natural body temperature. A sure way to upset such a system was to insert a liquid with a different temperature into the body, resulting in an increase or decrease of bodily heat, which resembled the temperature of that particular fluid. Al-Razi noted that a warm drink would heat the body much higher than its natural temperature. Thus, the drink would trigger a response from the body rather than transferring only its warmth or coldness to it. (Cf. I. E. Goodman)

This line of criticism could completely refute Galen's theory of humors and Aristotle's theory of the classical elements on which it was grounded. Al-Razi's alchemical experiments suggested other qualities of matter, such as "oiliness" and "sulphurousness", or inflammability and salinity, which were not readily explained by the traditional fire, water, earth, and air division of elements.

Al-Razi's challenge to the current fundamentals of medical theory was quite controversial. Many accused him of ignorance and arrogance, even though he repeatedly expressed his praise and gratitude to Galen for his contributions and labours, saying:

I prayed to God to direct and lead me to the truth in writing this book. It grieves me to oppose and criticize the man Galen from whose sea of knowledge I have drawn much. Indeed, he is the Master and I am the disciple. Although this reverence and appreciation will and should not prevent me from doubting, as I did, what is erroneous in his theories. I imagine and feel deeply in my heart that Galen has chosen me to undertake this task, and if he were alive, he would have congratulated me on what I am doing. I say this because Galen's aim was to seek and find the truth and bring light out of darkness. I wish indeed he were alive to read what I have published.

==== The Diseases of Children ====
Al-Razi's The Diseases of Children was the first monograph to deal with pediatrics as an independent field of medicine.

== Alchemy ==
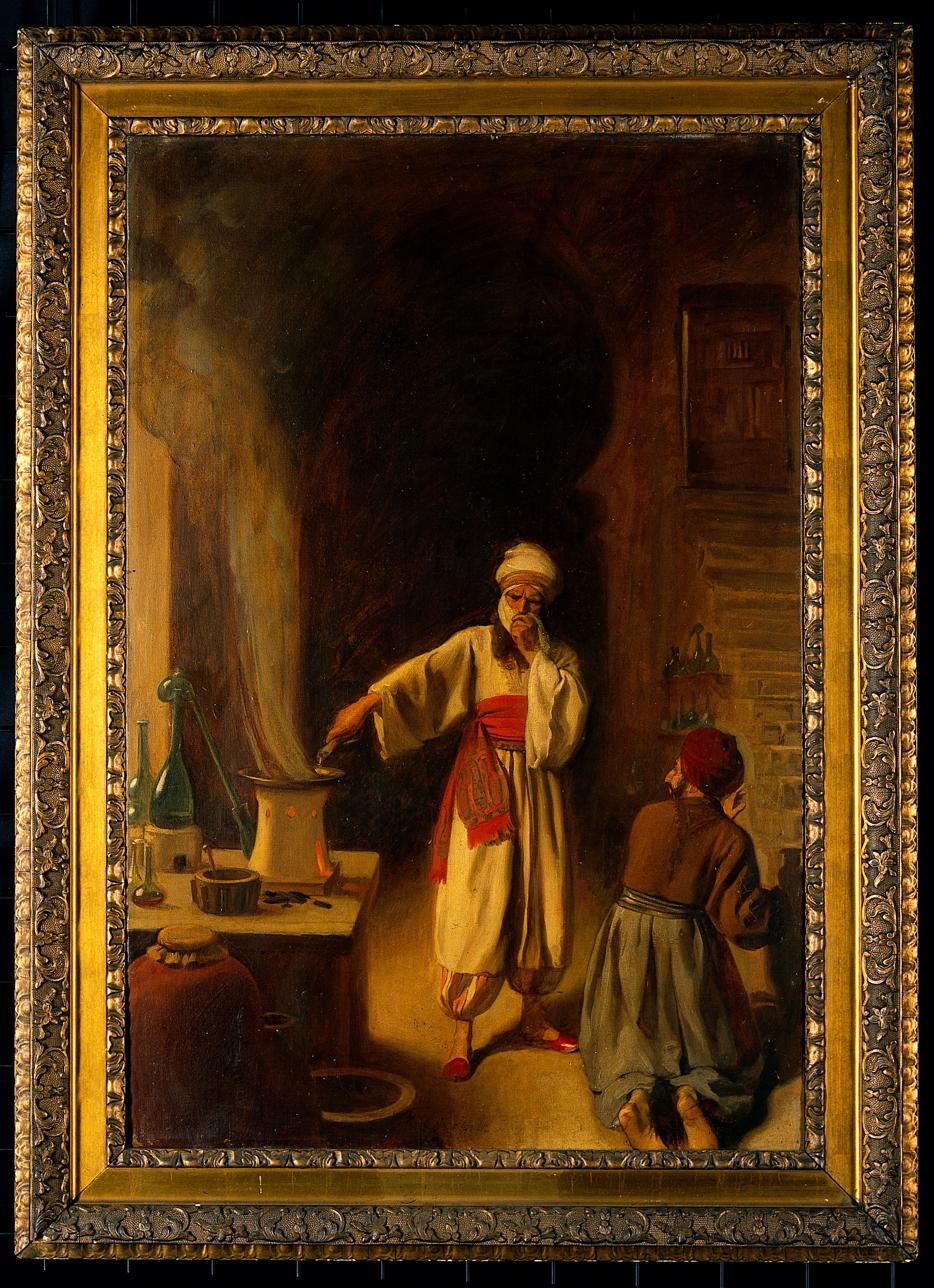
al-Razi in his laboratory (orientalist painting by Ernest Board, c. 1912)

=== The transmutation of metals ===
Al-Razi's interest in alchemy and his strong belief in the possibility of transmutation of lesser metals to silver and gold was attested half a century after his death by Ibn an-Nadim's book, The Philosopher's Stone (Lapis Philosophorum in Latin). Nadim attributed a series of twelve books to al-Razi, plus an additional seven, including his refutation to al-Kindi's denial of the validity of alchemy. Al-Kindi (801–873 CE) had been appointed by the Abbasid Caliph Ma'mun founder of Baghdad, to 'the House of Wisdom' in that city, he was a philosopher and an opponent of alchemy. Al-Razi's two best-known alchemical texts, which largely superseded his earlier ones: al-Asrar (الاسرار "The Secrets"), and Sirr al-Asrar (سر الاسرار "The Secret of Secrets"), which incorporates much of the previous work.

Apparently al-Razi's contemporaries believed that he had obtained the secret of turning iron and copper into gold. Biographer Khosro Moetazed reports in Mohammad Zakaria Razi that a certain General Simjur confronted al-Razi in public, and asked whether that was the underlying reason for his willingness to treat patients without a fee. "It appeared to those present that al-Razi was reluctant to answer; he looked sideways at the general and replied":

I understand alchemy and I have been working on the characteristic properties of metals for an extended time. However, it still has not turned out to be evident to me, how one can transmute gold from copper. Despite the research from the ancient scientists done over the past centuries, there has been no answer. I very much doubt if it is possible...

=== Major works on alchemy ===
Al-Razi's works present the first systematic classification of carefully observed and verified facts regarding chemical substances, reactions and apparatus, described in a language almost entirely free from mysticism and ambiguity.

==== The Secrets (Al-Asrar) ====
'The Secrets' (al-Asrar, Kitāb al-Asrār, 'Book of Secrets') was written in response to a request from al-Razi's close friend, colleague, and former student, Abu Muhammad ibn Yunis al-Bukhari, a Muslim mathematician, philosopher, and natural scientist.

==== Secret of Secrets (Sirr al-Asrar) ====
This is al-Razi's most famous book. Here he gives systematic attention to basic chemical operations important to the history of pharmacy. In this book al-Razi divides the subject of "matter' into three categories, as in his previous book Al-Asrar.

1. Knowledge and identification of the medical components within substances derived from plants, animals, and minerals, and descriptions of the best types for medical treatments.
2. Knowledge of equipment and tools of interest to and used by either alchemists or apothecaries.
3. Knowledge of seven alchemical procedures and techniques: sublimation and condensation of mercury, precipitation of sulfur, and arsenic calcination of minerals (gold, silver, copper, lead, and iron), salts, glass, talc, shells, and waxing.

This last category contains additional descriptions of other methods and applications used in transmutation:
- The added mixture and use of solvent vehicles.
- The amount of heat (fire) used, 'bodies and stones', (al-ajsad and al-ahjar) that can or cannot be transmuted into corporal substances such of metals and salts (al-amlah).
- The use of a liquid mordant which quickly and permanently colors lesser metals for more lucrative sale and profit.

Similar to the commentary on the 8th century text on amalgams ascribed to Jabir ibn Hayyan, al-Razi gives methods and procedures of coloring a silver object to imitate gold (gold leafing) and the reverse technique of removing its color back to silver. Gilding and silvering of other metals (alum, calcium salts, iron, copper, and tutty) are also described, as well as how colors will last for years without tarnishing or changing.

Al-Razi classified minerals into six divisions:

1. Four spirits (al-arwah): mercury, sal ammoniac, sulphur, and arsenic sulphide (orpiment and realgar).
2. Seven bodies (al-ajsad): silver, gold, copper, iron, black lead (plumbago), zinc (kharsind), and tin.
3. Thirteen stones (al-ahjar): Marcasite (marqashita), magnesia, malachite, tutty (tutiya, zinc oxide), talcum, lapis lazuli, gypsum, azurite, haematite (iron oxide), arsenic oxide, mica, asbestos, and glass (then identified as made of sand and alkali of which the transparent crystal damascene is considered the best).
4. Seven vitriols (al-zajat): alum (al-shabb الشب), and white (qalqadis القلقديس), black, red (suri السوري), and yellow (qulqutar القلقطار) vitriols (the impure sulfates of iron, copper, etc.), green (qalqand القلقند).
5. Seven borates: natron, and impure sodium borate.
6. Eleven salts (al-amlah): including brine, common salt, ashes, naphtha, live lime, and urine, rock, and sea salts. Then he separately defines and describes each of these substances, the best forms and colours of each, and the qualities of various adulterations.

Al-Razi gives also a list of apparatus used in alchemy. This consists of 2 classes:

1. Instruments used for the dissolving and melting of metals such as the blacksmith's hearth, bellows, crucible, thongs (tongue or ladle), macerator, stirring rod, cutter, grinder (pestle), file, shears, descensory, and semi-cylindrical iron mould.
2. Utensils used to carry out the process of transmutation and various parts of the distilling apparatus: the retort, alembic, shallow iron pan, potters kiln and blowers, large oven, cylindrical stove, glass cups, flasks, phials, beakers, glass funnel, crucible, aludel, heating lamps, mortar, cauldron, hair-cloth, sand- and water-bath, sieve, flat stone mortar and chafing-dish.

== Philosophy ==
Although al-Razi wrote extensively on philosophy, most of his works on this subject are now lost. Most of his religio-philosophical ideas, including his belief in five "eternal principles", are only known from fragments and testimonies found in other authors, who were often strongly opposed to his thought.

=== Metaphysics ===
Al-Razi's metaphysical doctrine derives from the theory of the "five eternals", according to which the world is produced out of an interaction between God and four other eternal principles (soul, matter, time, and place). He accepted a pre-socratic type of atomism of the bodies, and for that he differed from both the falasifa and the mutakallimun. While he was influenced by Plato and the medical writers, mainly Galen, he rejected taqlid and thus expressed criticism about some of their views. This is evident from the title of one of his works, Doubts About Galen.

== Views on religion ==
A number of contradictory works and statements about religion have been ascribed to al-Razi. Many sources claim that al-Razi viewed prophecy and revealed religion as unnecessary and delusional, claiming that all humans have the ability to access and discover truth (including the existence of God) through God-given reason. According to these sources, his skepticism of prophecy and view that no one group or religion has privileged access to the truth is driven by his view that all people have an equal basic capacity for rationality and discovery of truth, and that apparent differences in this capacity are simply a feature of interest, opportunity, and effort. Because of his supposed rejection of prophecy and acceptance of reason as the primary method for accessing the truth, al-Razi came to be admired as a freethinker by some.

According to al-Biruni's Bibliography of al-Razi (Risāla fī Fihrist Kutub al-Rāzī), al-Razi wrote two "heretical books": "Fī al-Nubuwwāt (On Prophecies) and "Fī Ḥiyal al-Mutanabbīn (On the Tricks of False Prophets). According to Biruni, the first "was claimed to be against religions" and the second "was claimed as attacking the necessity of the prophets." However, Biruni also listed some other works of al-Razi on religion, including Fi Wujub Da‘wat al-Nabi 'Ala Man Nakara bi al-Nubuwwat (Obligation to Propagate the Teachings of the Prophet Against Those who Denied Prophecies) and Fi anna li al-Insan Khaliqan Mutqinan Hakiman (That Man has a Wise and Perfect Creator), listed under his works on the "divine sciences". None of his works on religion is now extant in full.

Sarah Stroumsa has argued that al-Razi was a freethinker who rejected all revealed religions. However, Peter Adamson, Marwan Rashed and others hold that al-Razi did not reject revealed religion, on the basis of more recent evidence found in the writings of the theologian and philosopher Fakhr al-Din al-Razi (died 1210). Adamson states:

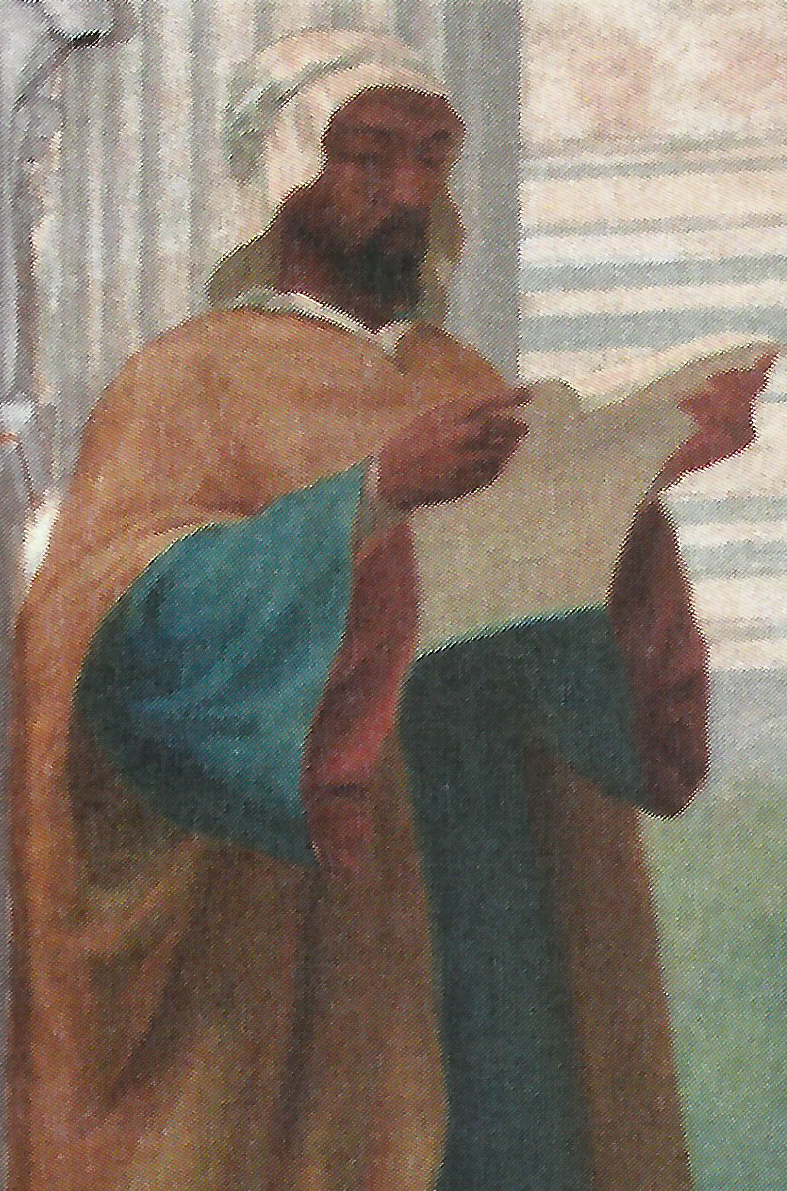
al-Razi as depicted by Veloso Salgado (c. 1906)

It is worth noting that Stroumsa's work predates Rashed's discovery of this evidence in Fakhr al-Dīn, so that she did not have the benefit of being able to consider how this new information could be reconciled with the Proofs. That is the goal I will set for myself in this chapter. I should lay my cards on the table and say that I am persuaded by Rashed's account, and do not believe that Razi was staging a general attack on prophecy or religion as Abū Ḥātim would have us think.

=== Debate with Abu Hatim ===
The views and quotes that are often ascribed to al-Razi where he appears to be critical of religion are found in a book written by Abu Hatim al-Razi, called Aʿlām al-nubuwwa (Signs of Prophecy), which documents a debate between Abu Hatim and al-Razi. Abu Hatim was an Isma'ili missionary who debated al-Razi, but whether he has faithfully recorded the views of al-Razi is disputed. Some historians claim that Abu Hatim accurately represented al-Razi's scepticism of revealed religion while others argue that Abu Hatim's work should be treated with scepticism given that he is a hostile source of al-Razi's beliefs and might have portrayed him as a heretic to discount his critique of the Ismāʿīlīs.

According to Abdul Latif al-'Abd, Islamic philosophy professor at Cairo University, Abu Hatim and his student, Ḥamīd al-dīn Karmānī (d. after 411AH/1020CE), were Isma'ili extremists who often misrepresented the views of al-Razi in their works. This view is also corroborated by early historians like al-Shahrastani who noted "that such accusations should be doubted since they were made by Ismāʿīlīs, who had been severely attacked by Muḥammad ibn Zakariyyā Rāzī". Al-'Abd points out that the views allegedly expressed by al-Razi contradict what is found in al-Razi's own works, like the Spiritual Medicine (Fī al-ṭibb al-rūḥānī). Peter Adamson concurs that Abu Hatim may have "deliberately misdescribed" al-Razi's position as a rejection of Islam and revealed religions. Instead, al-Razi was only arguing against the use of miracles to prove Muhammad's prophecy, anthropomorphism, and the uncritical acceptance of taqlīd vs naẓar. Adamson points out to a work by Fakhr al-din al-Razi where al-Razi is quoted as citing the Quran and the prophets to support his views.

In contrast, earlier historians such as Paul Kraus and Sarah Stroumsa accepted that the extracts found in Abu Hatim's book were either said by al-Razi during a debate or were quoted from a now lost work. According to the debate with Abu Hatim, al-Razi denied the validity of prophecy or other authority figures, and rejected prophetic miracles. He also directed a scathing critique on revealed religions and the miraculous quality of the Quran. They suggest that this lost work is either his famous al-ʿIlm al-Ilāhī or another shorter independent work called Makharīq al-Anbiyāʾ (The Prophets' Fraudulent Tricks). Abu Hatim, however, did not explicitly mention al-Razi by name in his book, but referred to his interlocutor simply as the mulḥid (lit. 'heretic').

== Criticism ==
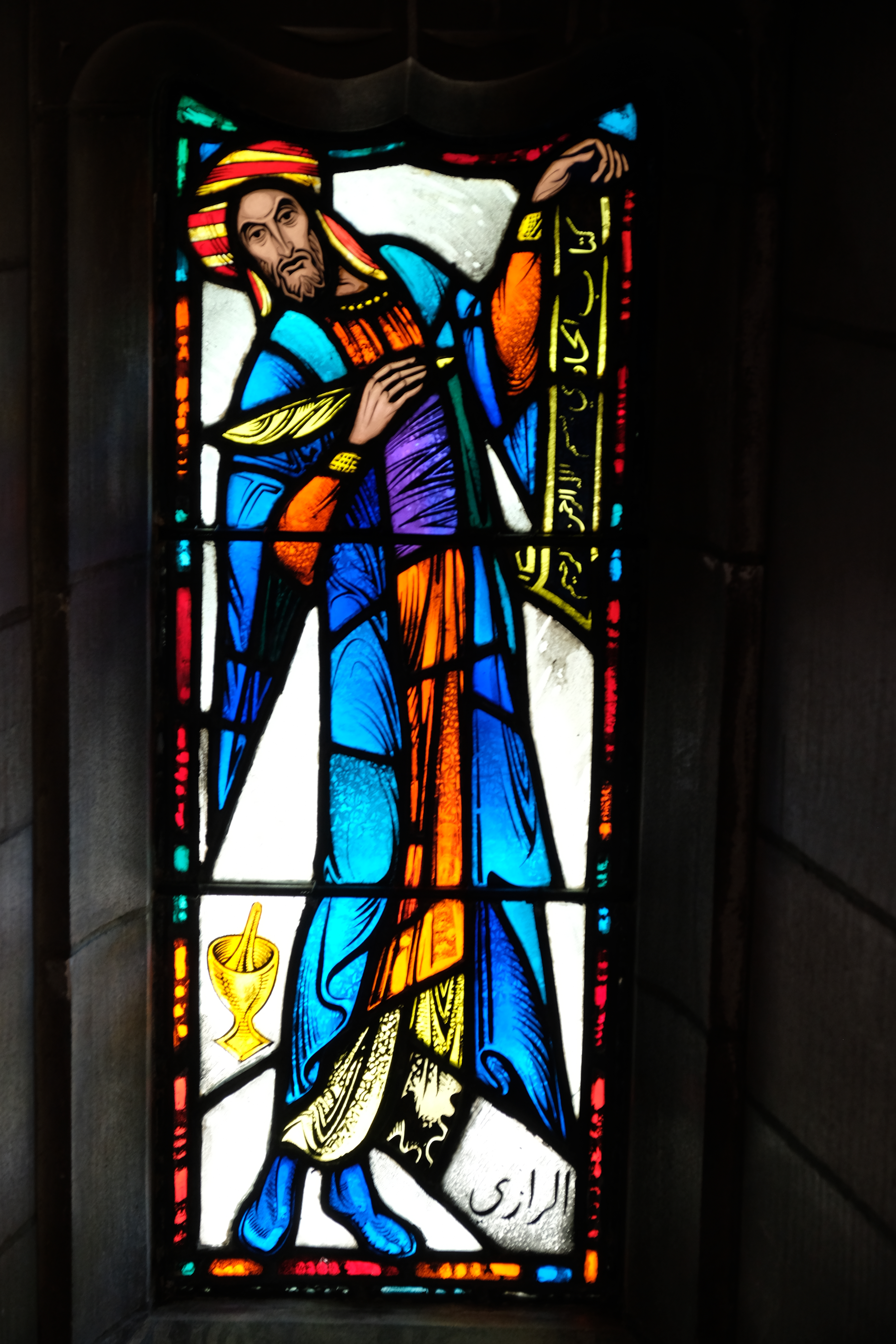
Stained-glass window depicting al-Razi (Princeton University Chapel, c. 1924–1928)

Al-Razi's religious and philosophical views were later criticized by Abu Rayhan Biruni and Avicenna in the early 11th century. Biruni in particular wrote a short treatise (risala) dealing with al-Razi, criticizing him for his sympathy with Manichaeism, his Hermetical writings, his religious and philosophical views, for refusing to mathematize physics, and his active opposition to mathematics. Avicenna, who was himself a physician and philosopher, also criticized al-Razi. During a debate with Biruni, Avicenna stated:

Or from Muhammad ibn Zakariyya al-Razi, who meddles in metaphysics and exceeds his competence. He should have remained confined to surgery and to urine and stool testing—indeed he exposed himself and showed his ignorance in these matters.

Nasr-i-Khosraw posthumously accused him of having plagiarized Iranshahri, whom Khosraw considered the master of al-Razi.

== Legacy ==
The modern-day Razi Institute in Karaj and Razi University in Kermanshah were named after him. A "Razi Day" ("Pharmacy Day") is commemorated in Iran every 27 August.

In June 2009, Iran donated a "Scholars Pavilion" or Chartagi to the United Nations Office in Vienna, now placed in the central Memorial Plaza of the Vienna International Center. The pavilion features the statues of al-Razi, Avicenna, Abu Rayhan Biruni, and Omar Khayyam.

George Sarton remarked him as "greatest physician of Islam and the Medieval Ages".

== See also ==
- List of Iranian scientists
- Medical Encyclopedia of Islam and Iran
- Medical literature
