= Abu'l-Fadl al-Bal'ami =

Samanid Vizier (died 940)

Abu'l-Fadl al-Bal'ami, also known as Bal'ami the Elder (died November 14, 940), was a Samanid statesman from the al-Bal'ami family, who served as the vizier of Nasr II from 922 to 938.

== Biography ==
Bal'ami is first mentioned as serving under the Samanid ruler Isma'il ibn Ahmad, and was later appointed as vizier by the latter's grandson, Nasr II. Just after Bal'ami had become the vizier of the Samanid Empire, the Zaydids invaded Khorasan, but were defeated by Bal'ami and the Simjurid general Simjur al-Dawati.

In 929, Nasr had his commander Muhammad ibn Ilyas imprisoned after being angered by him. Muhammad ibn Ilyas was, however, shortly freed after receiving the support of Bal'ami and was sent on a campaign in Gurgan. In 930 a revolt by Nasr's brothers broke out. They proclaimed one of their own, Yahya, as amir. Bal’ami managed to quell the rebellion by turning the brothers against each other. In 933, Bal'ami, along with Simjur al-Dawati, fought against the Dailamite military leader Makan ibn Kaki. In 938, Bal'ami was succeeded by Abu Ali Jayhani. After that, not much more is known about Bal'ami; he died on November 14, 940. He had a son named Amriak Bal'ami, who later also served as vizier of the Samanid Empire.

== Legacy ==
Iranica says the following about him:

Bal'ami was clearly, together with Jayhani, the driving force during what seems to have been the reign of a weak and impressionable ruler. He is further praised, e.g., by Al-Samani, as a encourager of poets and scholars, including of the poet Rudaki, and public buildings erected by him at Marv and Bukhara are mentioned. Not surprisingly, Nizam al-Mulk praises the family of Bal'ami as the viziers par excellence of the Samanids.

== Sources ==
- C. E. Bosworth "Bal'ami, Abu'l-Fazl Mohammad." Encyclopedia Iranica. 23 January 2014. <http://www.iranicaonline.org/articles/balami-abul-fazl-mohammad-b>
- Frye, R.N. (1975). "The Sāmānids". In Frye, R.N. (ed.). The Cambridge History of Iran, Volume 4: From the Arab Invasion to the Saljuqs. Cambridge: Cambridge University Press. pp. 136–161. ISBN 0-521-20093-8.

Preceded by Abu'l-Fadl ibn Ya'qub Nishapuri	Vizier of the Samanid Empire; 922 – 938	Succeeded by Abu Ali Jayhani
