= Abu Hatim Ahmad ibn Hamdan al-Razi =

10th-century Persian Ismaili philosopher

Abu Hatim Ahmad Ibn Hamdan al-Razi
- Died: 322 AH (932/933 CE)

Philosophical work
- Era: Medieval era
- Region: Islamic philosophy
- School: Isma'ilism
- Main interests: Philosophy, Theology, Proselytism, Exegesis, Jurisprudence
- Notable ideas: Precedence of Qadar over Qada

Abū Ḥātim Aḥmad ibn Ḥamdān al-Rāzī (Persian: ابو حاتم احمد بن حمدان الرازی) was an Ismaili philosopher of the 10th century, who died in 322 AH (932/933 CE). He was also the Da'i al-du'at (chief missionary) of Ray and the leader of the Ismaili da'wah in Central Persia.

== Life ==
He was born in Ray near modern Tehran. His last name is given as al-Warsenānī al-Laythī. He was a contemporary of Muhammad ibn Zakariya al-Razi and engaged in debates with him.

== Works ==
- Al-Jāmiʿ, a book on jurisprudence.
- Kitāb aʿlām al-nubuwwa (The Proofs of Prophecy), a refutation of Abū Bakr al-Rāzī.
- Kitāb al-Iṣlāḥ (Book of the Correction), “the oldest extant Ismāʾilī work presenting a Neoplatonic world-view.” Written as a corrective to the views of his contemporary Muḥammad ibn Aḥmad al-Nasafī.
- Kitāb al-Zīna (Book of the Ornament), on the superiority of the Arabic language and on religious terminology.

=== Bibliography ===
- Brion, Fabienne, “Philosophie et révélation : traduction annotée de six extraits du Kitâb A'lâm an-nubûwa d'Abû Hâtim ar-Râzî”, Bulletin de philosophie médiévale 28, 1986, p. 137-162.
- Brion, Fabienne, “Le temps, l'espace et la genèse du monde selon Abû Bakr al-Râzî. Présentation et traduction des chapitres I, 3 du « Kitâb a'lâm al-nubuwwa » d'Abû Hâtim al-Râzî”, Revue philosophique de Louvain, tome 87, n°74, 1989, p. 139-164.
- Khalidi, Tarif, parallel Arabic-English edition of Kitāb aʾlām al-nubuwwa (The Proofs of Prophecy), Brigham Young University Press, 2012, Islamic Translation Series (ISBN 9780842527873).
- Vajda, Georges, “Les lettres et les sons de la langue arabe d'après Abû Hâtim al-Râzî”, Arabica 8, 1961, p. 113-180.
