= Abu Salih Mansur =

Samanid prince (died 915)

Abu Salih Mansur (died 915) was a Samanid prince, who served as governor during the reign of his uncle Isma'il ibn Ahmad, his cousin Ahmad Samani, and Nasr II.

He governed several provinces during the reign of Isma'il ibn Ahmad and Ahmad Samani. The first time he is mentioned as a governor is in 902 when he was appointed as governor of Ray by Isma'il ibn Ahmad who had conquered territory as far as Qazvin in Iran. During his governorship of Ray, he became friends with Muhammad ibn Zakariya al-Razi, a famous Persian scholar. In 910 or 911, he was appointed as governor of Sistan by Ahmad Samani. However, Abu Salih's oppressive taxation policies sparked a revolt in Sistan in 912, led by the Khariji Muhammad ibn Hurmuz, who was a supporter of the Saffarid Amr ibn Ya'qub. Abu Salih was taken prisoner until the rebellion was crushed by a Samanid army under Husain ibn 'Ali Marvarrudhi in 913. 'Amr was sent to Samarkand, while the other rebel leaders were killed. Simjur al-Dawati then replaced Mansur as governor of Sistan.

In 914, Mansur was appointed governor of Khorasan, but anarchy was unleashed by the death of Ahmad ibn Ismail and the ascent to the throne of the 8-year-old child Nasr II. Mansur's father, Ishaq ibn Ahmad, revolted in Samarkand, while Mansur proclaimed himself as Emir of Nishapur, and several other cities. Mansur died a natural death in Nishapur probably in 915, before an army sent against him led by Hammuya ibn Ali reached the city.

== Sources ==
- Bosworth, C. E. "Abu Saleh Mansur." Encyclopedia Iranica. 30 December 2013. <http://www.iranicaonline.org/articles/abu-saleh-mansur-b>
- Frye, R.N. (1975). "The Sāmānids". In Frye, R.N. (ed.). The Cambridge History of Iran, Volume 4: From the Arab Invasion to the Saljuqs. Cambridge: Cambridge University Press. pp. 136–161. ISBN 0-521-20093-8.

Unknown	Governor of Ray; 902–910/1	Unknown
Preceded by Al-Mu'addal	Governor of Sistan; 910/1–913	Succeeded by Simjur Dawati
Unknown	Governor of Khorasan; 914–915	Unknown
