= Samuel Miklos Stern =

Hungarian linguist, Islamicist (1920–1969)

Samuel Miklos Stern (Tab, Hungary, 22 November 1920 – Oxford, United Kingdom, 29 October 1969) was a Hungarian–British academic specializing in Oriental studies.

== Life ==
He was born to an Orthodox Jewish family in Hungary, and lost his father at the age of three. His mother took over his early education, and ensured his upbringing in a religious-minded Jewish manner; Stern learned to read Hebrew before he could read the Latin alphabet. He continued his education at a Benedictine school and at a gymnasium in Budapest, where he acquired knowledge of Greek and Latin. At the same time, Stern began learning Arabic on his own. With the rise of Nazi Germany, in 1939 his mother sent Stern to safety in Mandatory Palestine. She remained behind, and would be killed during the Holocaust.

In Palestine he enrolled in the Hebrew University of Jerusalem, where he studied under a series of prominent teachers, including the Arabist David H. Baneth, the Semiticist Hans J. Polotsky, the philosopher Leon Roth, the historian of Islamic philosophy Julius Guttmann, and the Romanist Hiram Pflaum-Peri. At the Hebrew University he also met and befriended Shelomo Dov Goitein, who introduced him to medieval Islamic history. During World War II he interrupted his studies and served with the British censor office at Baghdad and Port Sudan. He finished his university studies in 1947. During his war service Stern met the Orientalist Paul Kraus, who introduced him to Isma'ili studies, a major area of interest for Stern during his later career.

After completing his degree, he went to Oxford University for post-graduate studies under H. A. R. Gibb at St. Catherine's College. He completed his PhD on Andalusi strophic poetry (The Old Andalusian Muwashshah, published posthumously as Hispano-Arabic Strophic Poetry) in 1950. He would remain based at Oxford University for the remainder of his life: he accepted invitations to lecture at other institutions, but refused any permanent position, despite offers from the likes of Harvard University. At Oxford he lived in the same house as his close friends, Professor Richard Walzer and his wife Sofie.

In 1951–1956, Stern served as assistant editor for the second edition of the Encyclopaedia of Islam. In 1956–57 he was Assistant Keeper of Oriental Coins at the Ashmolean Museum in Oxford, followed by being elected to a Research Fellowship at All Souls College. From 1964 and until his death he was additionally Lecturer In the History of the Islamic Civilization. Stern died of a severe asthma attack in October 1969.

== Work ==
Stern was a prolific scholar who wrote on a variety of topics and issues. By the time of his death, he had 265 publications, including a few books. Most of his writings on medieval Islamic history and civilization were posthumously collected and reprinted in three Variorum Collected Studies volumes (Medieval Arabic and Hebrew Thought in 1983, History and Culture in the Medieval Muslim World in 1984 and Coins and Documents from the Medieval Middle East in 1986).

=== Bibliography ===
- Stern, S. M., ed. (1964). Fāṭimid decrees : original documents from the Fatimid Chancery. London: Faber and Faber. pp. 1–188.
- Aristotle on the World State. Columbia, SC: University of South Carolina Press. 1970. pp. 1–88. ISBN 08-724-9127-7.
- Goldziher, Ignác (1973). Muslim studies. Translated by Stern, S. M. (2nd ed.). Chicago: Aldine Pub. Co. ISBN 978-0-873-95234-7. OCLC 508155.
- Stern, S. M. (1974). Harvey, L. P. (ed.). Hispano-Arabic strophic poetry : studies. Oxford: Clarendon Press. pp. 1–252. ISBN 978-0-198-15735-9.
- Studies in early Ismāʻīlism. Max Schloessinger memorial series, Monographs (Europe ed.). Leiden: E.J. Brill. 1983. pp. 1–340. ISBN 978-9-652-23388-2.

== Sources ==
- Daftary, Farhad (2016). "STERN, SAMUEL MIKLOS". Encyclopædia Iranica, online edition.
- Derek, Latham J.; Mitchell, Helen W. (1970). "The Bibliography of S. M. Stern". Journal of Semitic Studies. 15 (2): 226–238. doi:10.1093/jss/15.2.226.
- Wansbrough, John (1970). "Obituary: Samuel Miklos Stern". Bulletin of the School of Oriental and African Studies, University of London. 33 (3): 599–602. doi:10.1017/S0041977X0012659X. JSTOR 614526.
