= Pasanik =

Title of the companion of the Sasanian emperor

Pasānīg (older Pasānīk, meaning "follower", literally "those of the after (the king)") was the title of the courtiers of the Sasanian emperor. Another title containing the plural form in the 5th paragraph of Ayādgār ī Zarērān (originally composed in the Parthian era) denotes its antiquity, where Jāmāsp is called pasānīgān-sālār "Chief of the courtiers" attests its antiquity. The term has been borrowed in Georgian as ṗasaniḳi, ṗasanigi, and ṗasenagi, all meaning "bodyguard", and therefrom into Armenian as pasanik. It occurs in Syriac as pasānīqā, denoting the king's bodyguard.

== Sources ==
- Rapp, Stephen H. (2014) The Sasanian World through Georgian Eyes: Caucasia and the Iranian Commonwealth in Late Antique Georgian Literature Ashgate Publishing
- Zakeri, Mohsen (1995). Sasanid Soldiers in Early Muslim Society: The Origins of 'Ayyārān and Futuwwa. Otto Harrassowitz Verlag. pp. 1–391. ISBN 3447036524.
