= Abu-Mansuri Shahnameh =

Persian literary book

The Abu-Mansuri Shahnameh or Shahnameh of Abu-Mansur (Persian: شاهنامهٔ ابومنصوری) was a prose epic and history of the Persian Empire before Muslim conquests, composed at the order of Abu Mansur Muhammad in 346 AH (April 957 AD). It was the main source for the Shahnameh of Ferdowsi. The Abu-Mansuri Shahnameh is now lost, but its preface, which consists of 15 pages, has survived and is one of the oldest examples of Persian prose and is considered one of the most valuable heritages of Persian literature. The Abu-Mansuri Shahnameh was composed by four mowbeds: Old Mākh from Herat, Yazdāndād son of Shāpur from Sistan, Shāhooy-e Khorshid son of Bahrām from Nishapur, Shādān son of Barzin from Tus. Before Ferdowsi, Abu-Mansur Daqiqi tried to versify the Abu-Mansuri Shahnameh, but he died after writing almost 1,000 verses. Ferdowsi has included these 1,000 verses in his Shahnameh.
