= Biderafsh =

Turani warrior in Persian mythology

Biderafsh (Persian: بیدِرَفْش, Middle Persian: Wīdrafš, from Old Iranian: *wi-drafša, meaning "with unfurled banner") is a Turanian hero in Shahnameh, the national epic of Greater Iran. He fought in Arjasp's army against Iranians.

When Arjasp, the king of Turan, learns that Iranians have converted to Zoroastrianism, he writes a threatening letter to Goshtasp, the then king of Iran and asks him to recant the new faith. Biderafsh and Nāmkhāst were sent to Iran as envoys of this letter. In the ensuing war between Iran and Turan that takes place because of Goshtasp's rejection, Zarir, Goshtasp's brother, was killed by Biderafsh. Biderafsh himself in turn was killed by Esfandiar. Beside Shahnameh, Biderafsh is mentioned in other sources such as Tabari, Bal'ami and Ebn Balkhi, and also in Ayadegar-e Zariran, a Middle Persian epic.
