= Florence Shahnameh =

Oldest surviving manuscript of the Shahnameh

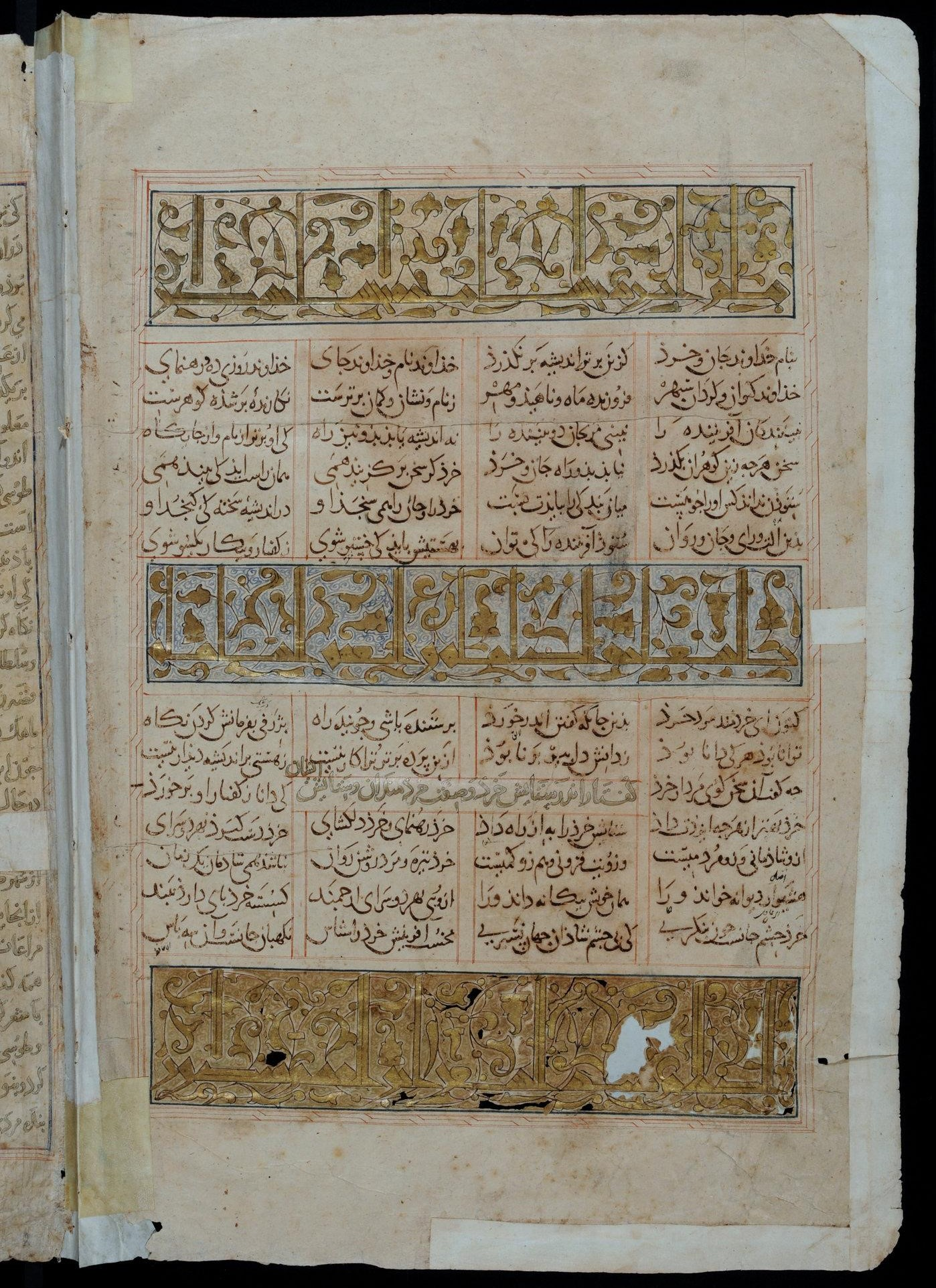
Page from the Florence Shahnameh

The Florence Shahnameh is the oldest surviving manuscript of the Shahnameh by Ferdowsi. It dates from 614 AH (1217 CE), 200 years after the final completion of the epic poem in 1010, and is unillustrated. It is a very important manuscript, because it contains old forms of many words. It was discovered in 1978 by Angelo Piemontese, the Italian scholar in the National Central Library of Florence. Prior to the discovery of this manuscript, a London manuscript was considered the oldest surviving manuscript (675 AH, 1276–1277 CE). Djalal Khaleghi Motlagh used this manuscript in his edition of Shahnameh. Older editions of the Shahnameh like the Moscow Edition, did not use this manuscript, as it had not been discovered yet. The manuscript is incomplete, containing only half of the text.
