= Daqiqi =

Persian writer

- ابومنصور دقیقی
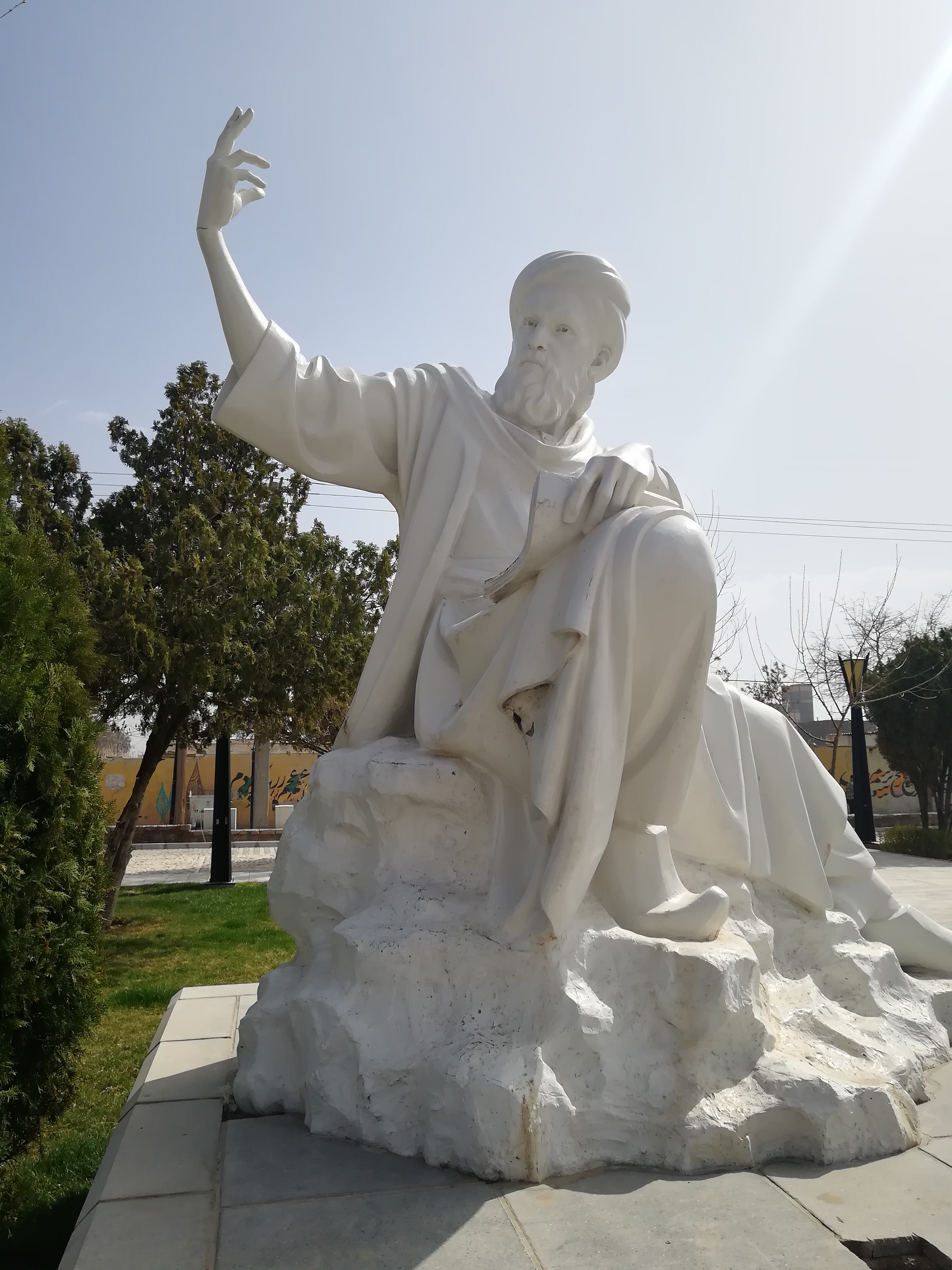
- Statue of Daqiqi in Tus, Iran
- Born: Abu Mansur Muhammad ibn Ahmad Daqiqi c. 935; Tus, Khorasan, Samanid Empire (disputed)
- Died: 977
- Occupation: Poet
- Writing career
- Language: Persian
- Genres: National epic; qasida; lyrics; mathnawi
- Notable work: Writing the story of Gushtasp in the Shahnameh

Abu Mansur Daqiqi (Persian: ابومنصور دقیقی), better simply known as Daqiqi (دقیقی), was one of the most prominent Persian poets of the Samanid era. He was the first to undertake the creation of the national epic of Iran, the Shahnameh, but was killed in 977 after only completing 1,000 verses. His work was continued by his contemporary Ferdowsi, who would later become celebrated as one of the most influential figure in Persian literature.

== Name ==
Daqiqi's personal name was Muhammad ibn Ahmad, whilst his patronymic was Abu Mansur, thus his full name being Abu Manṣūr Muḥammad ibn Ahmad Daqīqī.

== Background and religion ==
Daqiqi was born sometime after 932. Like many other Iranian grandees and scholars of the early Middle Ages, Daqiqi was most likely born into a family of Iranian landowners (dehqans), or at least was descended from such a class. During this period, there was a large amount of growth in literature, mostly in poetry. It was under the Iranian Samanid Empire that Persian literature appeared in Transoxania and was formally recognized. The advancement of an Islamic New Persian literature thus started in Transoxiana and Khorasan instead of Fars, the homeland of the Persians.

Daqiqi's place of birth is disputed; cities of Bukhara, Samarkand, Balkh, Marv, and Tus have been described as his birthplace; the latter seems more likely. His religion belief is disputed amongst scholars. Although he had a Muslim name, this "was not in itself proof of any religious beliefs, since numerous prominent Iranian scholars and officials converted to Islam during the early Islamic period in order to maintain their means of livelihood but practised Zoroastrianism in secret" (Tafazzoli). His birthplace, Tus, was at that time a predominantly Shi'ite city, and during Abu Mansur Muhammad's governorship had become the hub of Iranian nationalism.

According to Djalal Khaleghi-Motlagh, it is thus likely that Daqiqi, possibly like fellow poet and Tus native Ferdowsi, was an adherent of Shia Islam. Many Shi'ite Muslims were proud of their ancient Iranian heritage, which resulted in them being described as Qarmatians and Shu'ubis and classified as Majus (Zoroastrians) and Zindiq (Manicheans). Some quotations from Daqiqi's poetic verses, however, show a strong veneration towards Zoroastrianism, which has led many scholars such as Theodor Nöldeke and A. Shapour Shahbazi to favor a Zoroastrian origin for Daqiqi. In one of Daqiqi's verses, he applauds the Zoroastrian religion as one of the four things most important to him:

Daqiqi has chosen four qualities of all good and evil things in the world:
Ruby-coloured lips and the sound of the lute.
Old red wine and the Zoroastrian religion!

== Biography ==
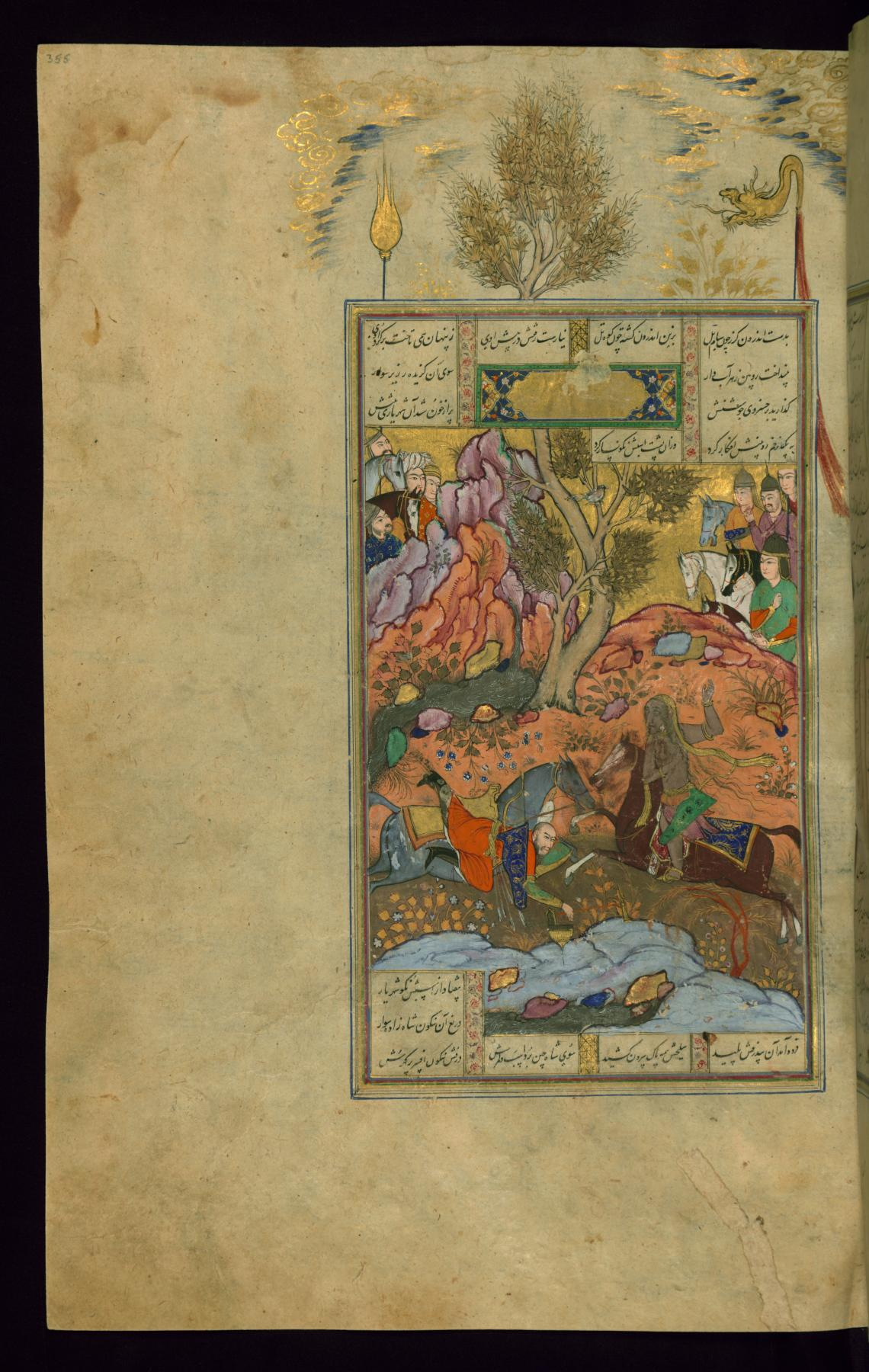
17th-century Shahnameh illustration of Biderafsh killing Zarir, the brother of Gushtasp.

Daqiqi began his career at the court of the Muhtajid ruler Abu'l Muzaffar ibn Muhammad in Chaghaniyan, and was later invited to the Samanid court by the Samanid ruler (amir) Mansur I (r. 961–976). Under the Samanids, special interest was shown in ancient Iranian legends and heroic traditions, thus inspiring Daqiqi to write the Shahnameh ("The Book of Kings"), a long epic poem based on the history of the Iranians.

He was, however, reportedly murdered by his slave in 977. Only a small part of Shahnameh had been completed, which was about the conflict between Gushtasp and Arjasp. The rapid growth of interest in ancient Iranian history made Ferdowsi continue the work of Daqiqi, completing the Shahnameh in 994, only a few years before the fall of the Samanid Empire. He later completed a second version of the Shahnameh in 1010, which he presented to the Ghaznavid sultan Mahmud (r. 998–1030). However, his work was not as appreciated by the Ghaznavids as it was by the Samanids.

Daqiqi's small part, which included around 1,000 verses, was maintained in Ferdowsi's Shahnameh; his technique is more old-fashioned compared to that of Ferdowsi, and, in Khaleghi-Motlagh's view, it is "dry and devoid of the similes and images that are to be found in Ferdowsi's poetry". This was mentioned in the Shahnameh by Ferdowsi, who, while admiring Daqiqi, also criticized his poetic style and considered it inappropriate for the national epic of Iran.

== Sources ==
- Dahlén, Ashk (2016), "Literary Interest in Zoroastrianism in Tenth-Century Iran: The Case of Daqiqi's Account of Goshtāsp and Zarathustra in the Shāhnāmeh", in Williams, Alan; Stewart, Sarah (eds.), The Zoroastrian Flame: Exploring Religion, History and Tradition, I.B. Tauris, pp. 249–276, ISBN 9780857728869.
- Frye, R. N. (1975). "The Sāmānids". In Frye, R. N. (ed.). The Cambridge History of Iran, Volume 4: From the Arab Invasion to the Saljuqs. Cambridge: Cambridge University Press. pp. 136–161. ISBN 978-0-521-20093-6.
- Khaleghi-Motlagh, Djalal (1993). http://www.iranicaonline.org/articles/daqiqi-abu-mansur-ahmad-b. In Yarshater, Ehsan (ed.). Encyclopædia Iranica. Vol. VI/6: Daf(f) and Dāyera–Dārā. London and New York: Routledge & Kegan Paul. pp. 661–662. ISBN 978-1-56859-004-2.
- Bosworth, C. E. (1998). "The Ghaznavids". History of Civilizations of Central Asia: Age of Achievement, A.D. 750 to the end of the 15th-century. UNESCO. pp. 95–118. ISBN 9789231032110.
