= Ferdowsi =

Persian poet (940–1025)

- فردوسی
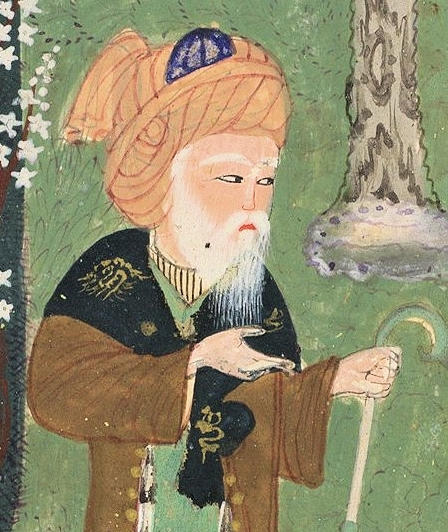
- Posthumous miniature of Ferdowsi, (c. 1476–1486)
- Born: Abu al-Qasim Mansur bin Hasan Tosi (Note: Persian: ابوالقاسم منصور بن حسن توسی, romanized: Abū’l-Qāsim Manṣūr bin Ḥasan Firdawsī Tōsī); 940; Tus, Samanid Empire
- Died: 1025 (aged 84–85); Tus, Ghaznavid Empire
- Resting place: Tomb of Ferdowsi, Razavi Khorasan, Iran
- Occupation: Poet
- Children: 2
- Writing career
- Pen name: Ferdowsi (Note: Also Firdawsi, (Persian: فردوسی, romanized: Firdawsī).) (main): Hakim Tos; Hakim Sukhna; Ustad Tos
- Language: Early New Persian
- Period: Samanids and Ghaznavids
- Genres: Persian poetry; National epic; Khorasan style
- Notable work: Shahnameh

Abul-Qāsem Mansur bin Hasan Tosi (Note: There is no certainty about Ferdowsi's actual personal name, but the name of "Manṣūr ibn Ḥasan", which appears in the oldest manuscript of the Shahnameh, i.e. the Shahnameh of Florence, as well as the Arabic translation of the Shahnameh by Bundari, is more likely to be his personal name.) (940–1025), better known by his pen name Ferdowsi, was a Persian poet who is notable for being the author of the Shahnameh ("Book of Kings"), which is one of the world's longest epic poems created by a single poet, and the greatest epic of the Persian-speaking countries. Ferdowsi is celebrated as one of the most influential figures of Persian literature and one of the greatest in the history of literature.

Born in 940, Ferdowsi came from a family of landed gentry. He spent the beginning of his life in the Samanid era and at the same time as the movement for independence and identity among Iranians. The Samanid kings, with the support of the Persian language, prepared a brilliant time for the cultivation of the Persian language and thought, and Ferdowsi is clearly indebted to his predecessors and all those who reached the pinnacle of the Persian language in the ninth and tenth centuries, and he was able to use that capital to express his speech so brilliantly. In a comprehensive look at Ferdowsi's knowledge and learnings, it can be said that he knew the Arabic language, but he did not dominate Arabic literature. In the "Baysunghur Shahnameh", Ferdowsi's name is associated with the title of "Hakim", which according to some refers to the wisdom of Khusrawani.

Researchers believe that Ferdowsi began composing the Shahnameh based on the Abu-Mansuri Shahnameh at the age of 30. The only poem that has been clarified about him is the Shahnameh itself. The Shahnameh is Ferdowsi's most famous poem and one of the greatest writings of ancient Persian literature. Ferdowsi completed the Shahnameh in 995, three years before Sultan Mahmud of Ghazni's accession to the throne. In 1010, Ferdowsi completed the second edition. Other poems have also been attributed to Ferdowsi, though most of these claims are considered baseless. The most famous of them is the masnavi of Yusuf and Zulaikha. Another poem that is known to be by Ferdowsi is a satire in condemnation of Mahmud.

In the Shahnameh, Ferdowsi links the culture of pre-Islamic Iran with the culture of post-Islamic Iran. It can be concluded from the Shahnameh that Ferdowsi was influenced by ancient Iranian religions such as Zoroastrianism, Zurvanism, Manichaeism, Mazdakism and Mithraism, although some researchers consider the source of these influences to be the themes of Ferdowsi's work, to which he was very loyal. Also, due to his peasant origins, he was familiar with the ancient culture and rituals of Iran, and later increased the scope of this knowledge, so that this knowledge established his poetic worldview. What Ferdowsi was dealing with was not only poetic, but also intellectual; he did not write fiction. Ferdowsi considers wisdom as the source and capital of all goodness. He believes that a person with wisdom recognizes good and evil from each other, and in this way, he reaches the happiness of this world and the salvation of that world. Ferdowsi carefully examined his motifs, most of which were from the Abu-Mansuri Shahnameh. He was able to gather an excerpt from the vast wealth of knowledge he had at his disposal to have a legacy carried by the Persians, Turks, and Indians.

== Etymology ==
Except for his kunya (ابوالقاسم – Abū al-Qāsim, meaning 'father of Qasim') and his pen name (فردوسی – Firdawsī, meaning 'paradisic'), nothing is known with any certainty about his full name. According to Djalal Khaleghi-Motlagh, the information given by the 13th-century author Bundari about Ferdowsi's name should be taken as the most reliable. Bundari calls the poet al-Amir al-Hakim Abu al-Qasim Mansur ibn al-Hasan al-Firdawsi al-Tosi. (Note: Al-Amir and al-Hakim are honorary titles. Abu al-Qasim is a kunya. Mansur is a given name. Ibn al-Hasan is a patronymic ('son of Hasan'). Al-Firdawsi is a pen name (takhallus). Al-Tosi is a nisba ('from Tus').) From an early period on, he has been referred to by different additional names and titles, the most common one being حکیم / Ḥakīm ("philosopher"). Based on this, his full name is given in Persian sources as حکیم ابوالقاسم فردوسی توسی / Ḥakīm Abū al-Qāsim Firdawsī Tōsī. Due to the non-standardised romanizations of Persian, different spellings of his name are used in English works, including Firdawsi, Firdusi, Firdosi, Firdausi, etc. The Encyclopaedia of Islam uses the spelling Firdawsī, based on the standardised transliteration method of the German Oriental Society. The Encyclopædia Iranica, which uses a modified version of the same method (with a stronger emphasis on modern Iranian Persian intonations), gives the spelling Ferdowsī. (Note: The spelling Ferdowsi is based on the modern Iranian Persian pronunciation, while Firdawsī reflects the historical Early New Persian, Classical Persian (as well as the modern Dari/Afghan and Tajik Persian) pronunciation. The diphthong ow of modern Iranian Persian was historically pronounced as aw (i.e, in the Early New Persian, Classical Persian; as well as the modern Dari/Afghan and Tajik Persian). The 'short' vowel e of modern Iranian Persian was historically (in both Early New Persian and Classical Persian) pronounced i (modern Dari/Afghan and Tajik Persian pronunciations are closer to the latter).) The modern Tajik transliteration of his name in Tajik Cyrillic is Ҳаким Абулқосим Фирдавсӣ Тӯсӣ (Hakim Abdulqosim Firdavsī Tüsī).

== Life ==
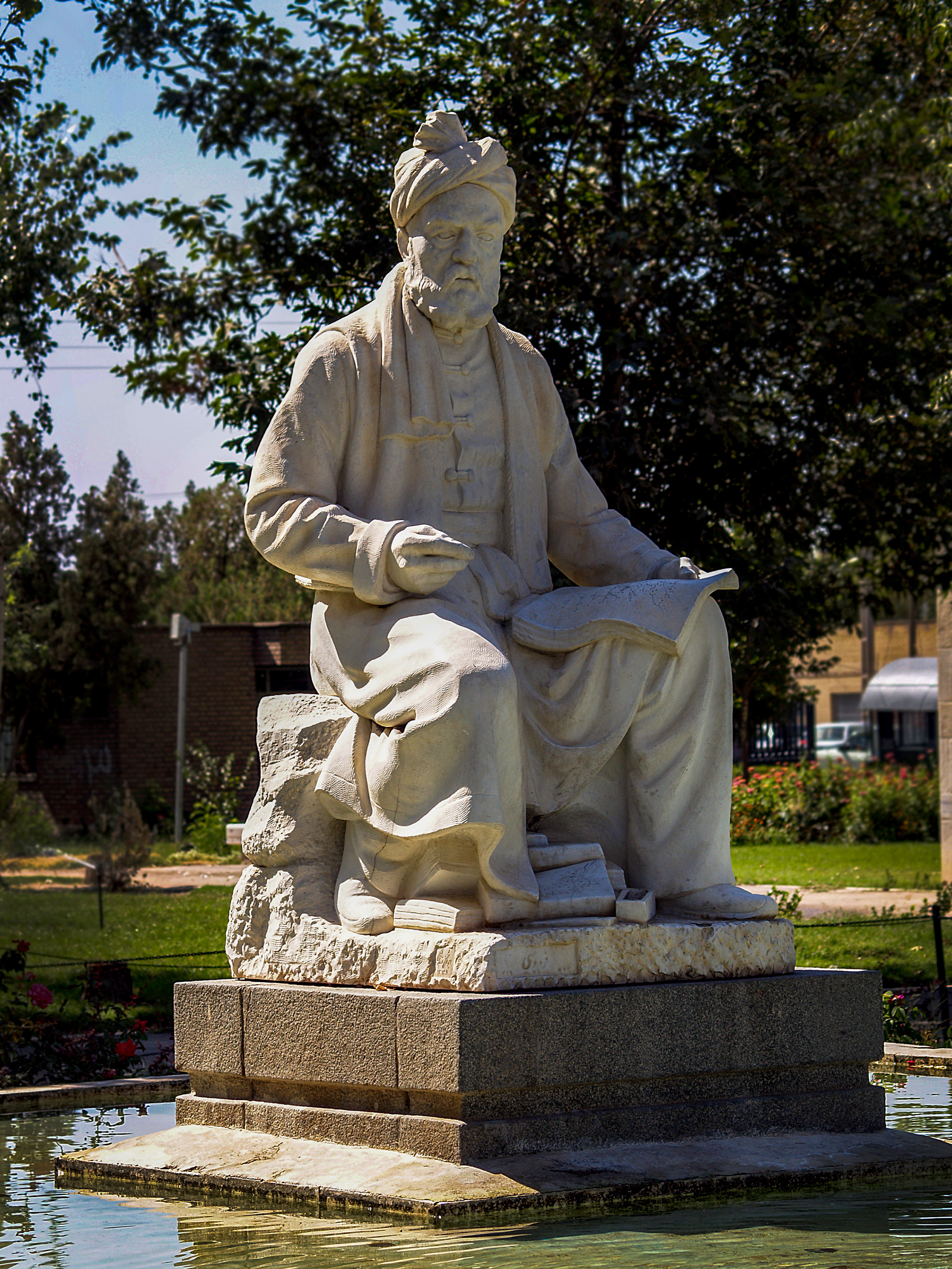
Statue of Ferdowsi in Tus by Abolhassan Sadighi

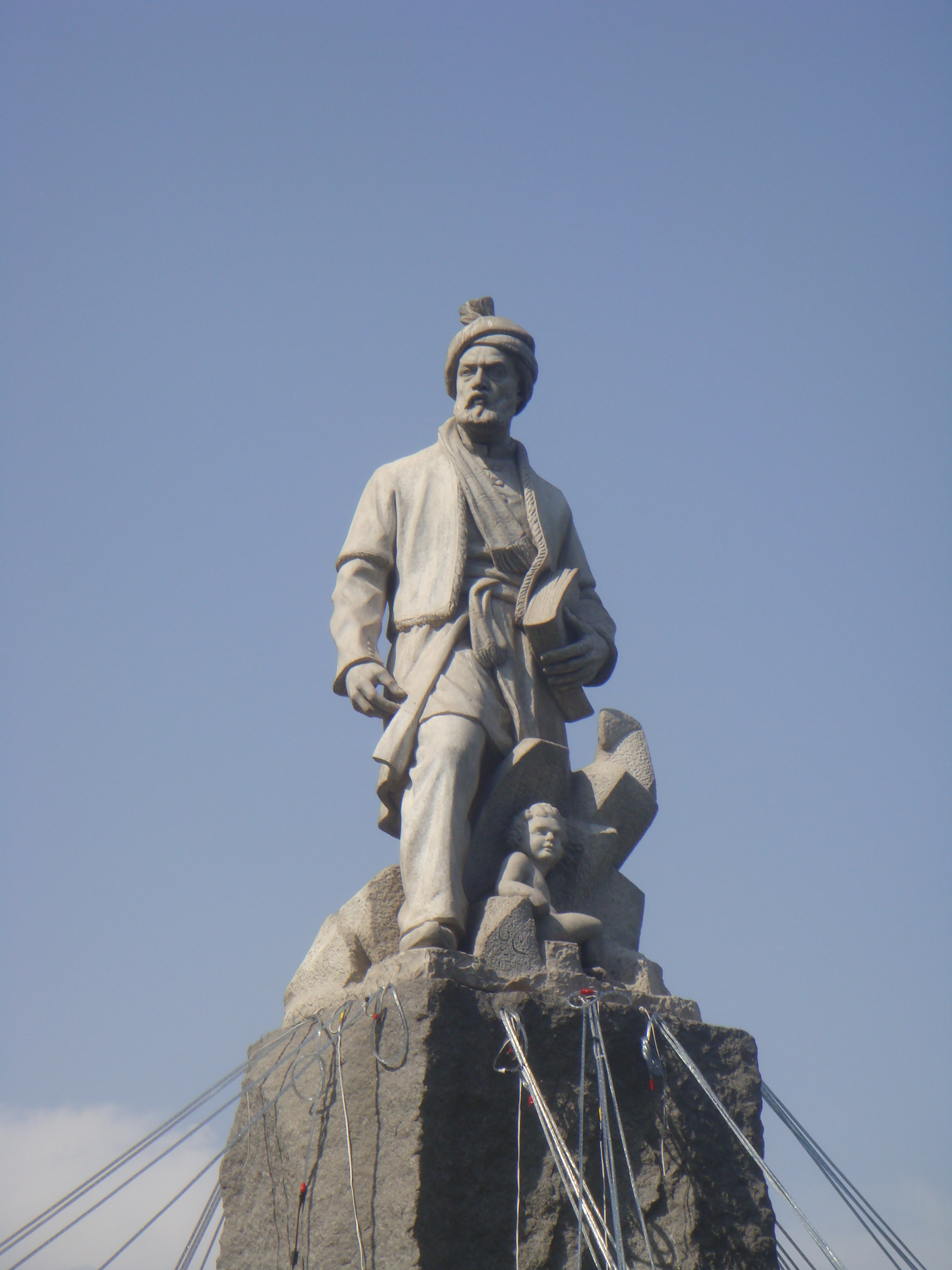
Statue of Ferdowsi in Ferdowsi Square, Tehran

=== Family ===
Ferdowsi (Persian: ابوالقاسم فردوسی توسی) was born into a family of Persian landowners (dehqans) in 940 in the village of Paj, near the city of Tus, in the Khorasan region of the Samanid Empire, which is located in the present-day Razavi Khorasan province of northeastern Iran. Little is known about Ferdowsi's early life. The poet had a wife, who was probably literate and came from the same dehqan class. The dehqans were landowning Iranian gentry who had flourished under the Sasanian dynasty (the last pre-Islamic dynasty to rule Iran) and whose power, though diminished, had survived into the Islamic era which followed the Islamic conquests of the 7th century. The dehqans were attached to the pre-Islamic literary heritage, as their status was associated with it (so much so that dehqan is sometimes used as a synonym for "Iranian" in the Shahnameh). Thus they saw it as their task to preserve the pre-Islamic cultural traditions, including tales of legendary kings.

He had a son, who died at the age of 37, and was mourned by the poet in an elegy which he inserted into the Shahnameh.

=== Background ===
The Islamic conquests of the 7th century brought gradual linguistic and cultural changes to the Iranian Plateau. By the late 9th century, as the power of the caliphate had weakened, several local dynasties emerged in Greater Iran. Ferdowsi grew up in Tus, a city under the control of one of these dynasties, the Samanids, who claimed descent from the Sasanian general Bahram Chobin (whose story Ferdowsi recounts in one of the later sections of the Shahnameh). The Samanid bureaucracy used the New Persian language, which had been used to bring Islam to the Eastern regions of the Iranian world and supplanted local languages, and commissioned translations of Pahlavi texts into New Persian. Abu Mansur Muhammad, a dehqan and governor of Tus, had ordered his minister Abu Mansur Mamari to invite several local scholars to compile a prose Shahnameh ("Book of Kings"), which was completed in 1010. Although it no longer survives, Ferdowsi used it as one of the sources of his epic. Samanid rulers were patrons of such important Persian poets as Rudaki and Daqiqi, and Ferdowsi followed in the footsteps of these writers.

Details about Ferdowsi's education are lacking. While it is likely that he learned Arabic in school, there is no evidence in the Shahnameh that he knew either Arabic or Pahlavi.

=== Religion ===
Most historians consider Ferdowsi to have been a Shia Muslim, although there has been controversy over which branch of Shia Islam he followed. He has variously been identified as Zaydi, Isma'ili, or Twelver Shi'ite, while passages in some manuscripts praising Abu Bakr, Umar, and Uthman have led some scholars to argue that he was Sunni. Nöldeke, whose interpretation is followed by Djalal Khaleghi-Motlagh, described Ferdowsi as a monotheist who respected the religion of his ancestors while considering his own faith the only true one. Ferdowsi attributed creation and human actions to God and rejected astrological claims that the stars could influence human affairs. He began his epic poem Shahnameh by invoking God as the Creator of the world and reason. His knowledge of pre-Islamic Iranian traditions was influenced in part by his background as a dehqan. Kolsoum Ghazanfari and Dick Davis note that the poem's treatment of these traditions does not directly correspond to Zoroastrian theology, while Khaleghi-Motlagh links some fatalistic elements to older Iranian ideas, possibly including Zurvanism in the Sasanian period.

=== Life as a poet ===
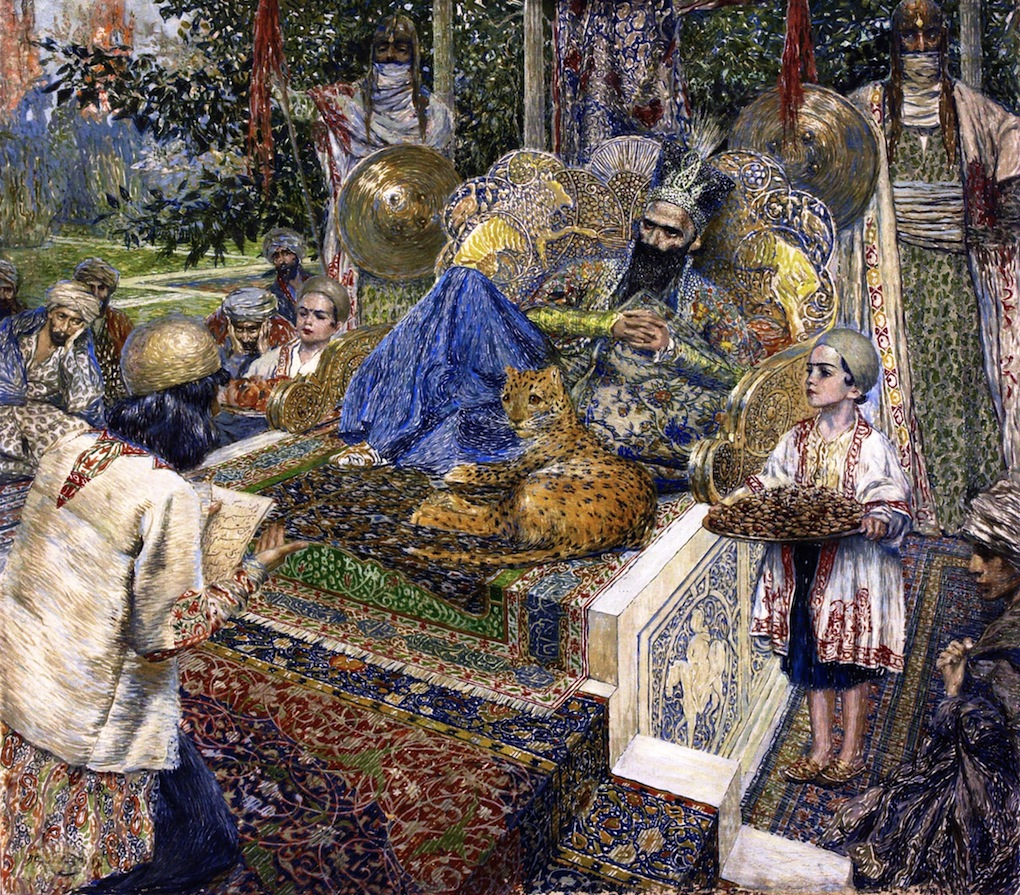
Depiction of Ferdowsi reading the Shahnameh to Mahmud of Ghazni, Afghanistan

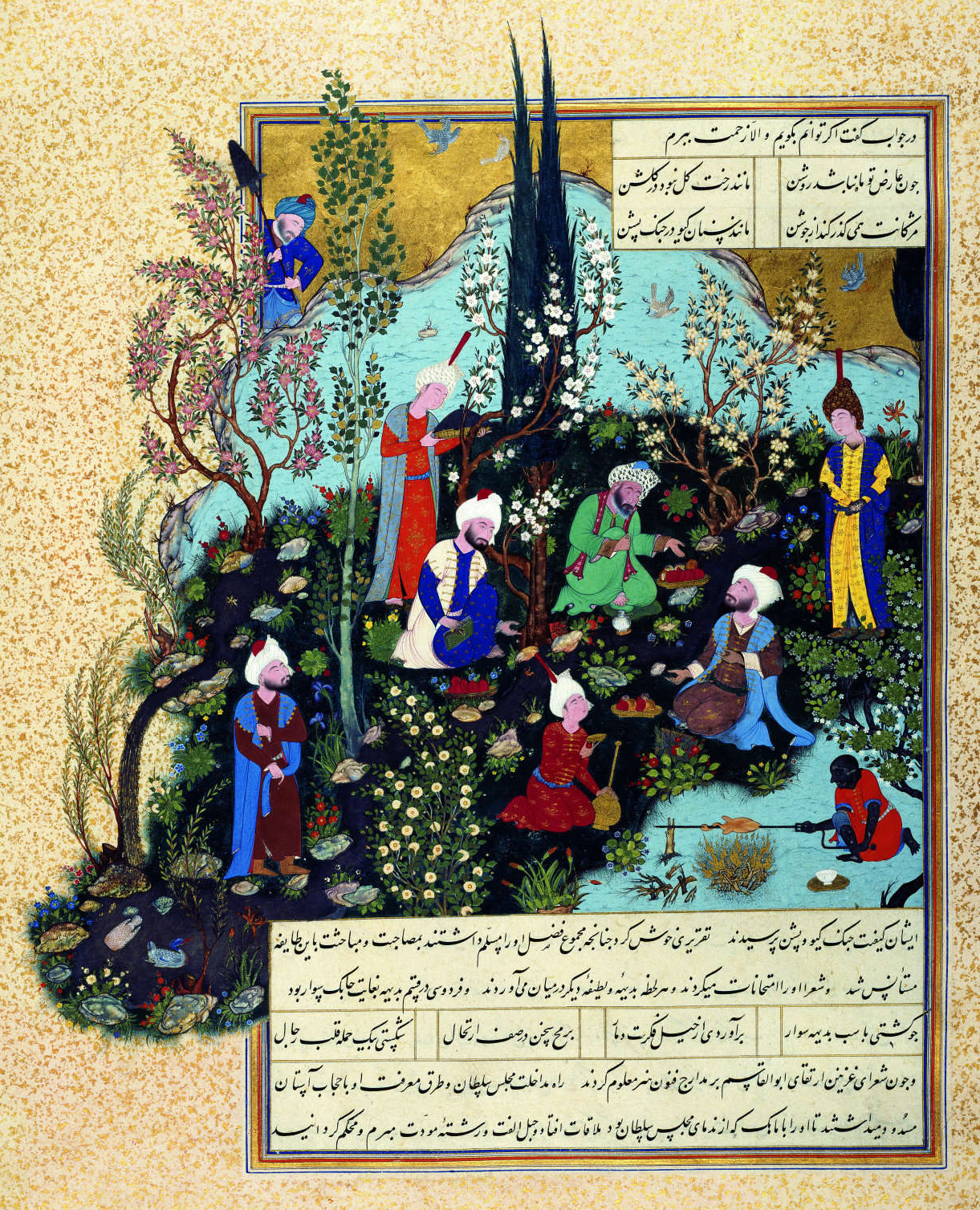
Ferdowsi and the three Ghaznavid court poets

It is possible that Ferdowsi wrote some early poems which have not survived. He began work on the Shahnameh around 977, intending it as a continuation of the work of his fellow poet Daqiqi, who had been assassinated by his slave. Like Daqiqi, Ferdowsi employed the prose Shahnameh of Abd-al-Razzaq as a source. He received generous patronage from the Samanid prince Mansur and completed the first version of the Shahnameh in 994. When the Turkic Ghaznavids overthrew the Samanids in the late 990s, Ferdowsi continued to work on the poem, rewriting sections to praise the Ghaznavid Sultan Mahmud. Mahmud's attitude to Ferdowsi and how well he rewarded the poet are matters which have long been subject to dispute and have formed the basis of legends about the poet and his patron (see below). The Turkic Mahmud may have been less interested in tales from Iranian history than the Samanids. The later sections of the Shahnameh have passages which reveal Ferdowsi's fluctuating moods: in some he complains about old age, poverty, illness and the death of his son; in others, he appears happier. Ferdowsi finally completed his epic on 8 March 1010. Virtually nothing is known with any certainty about the last decade of his life.

=== Tomb ===
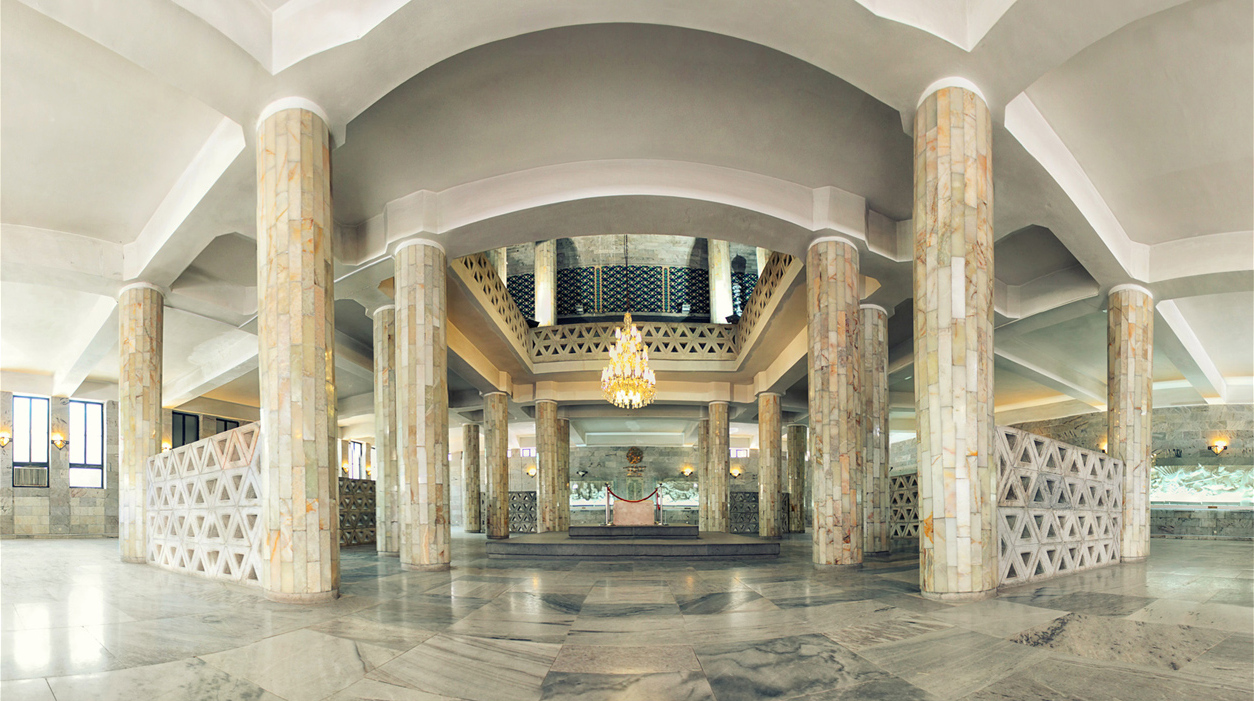
the Tomb of Ferdowsi

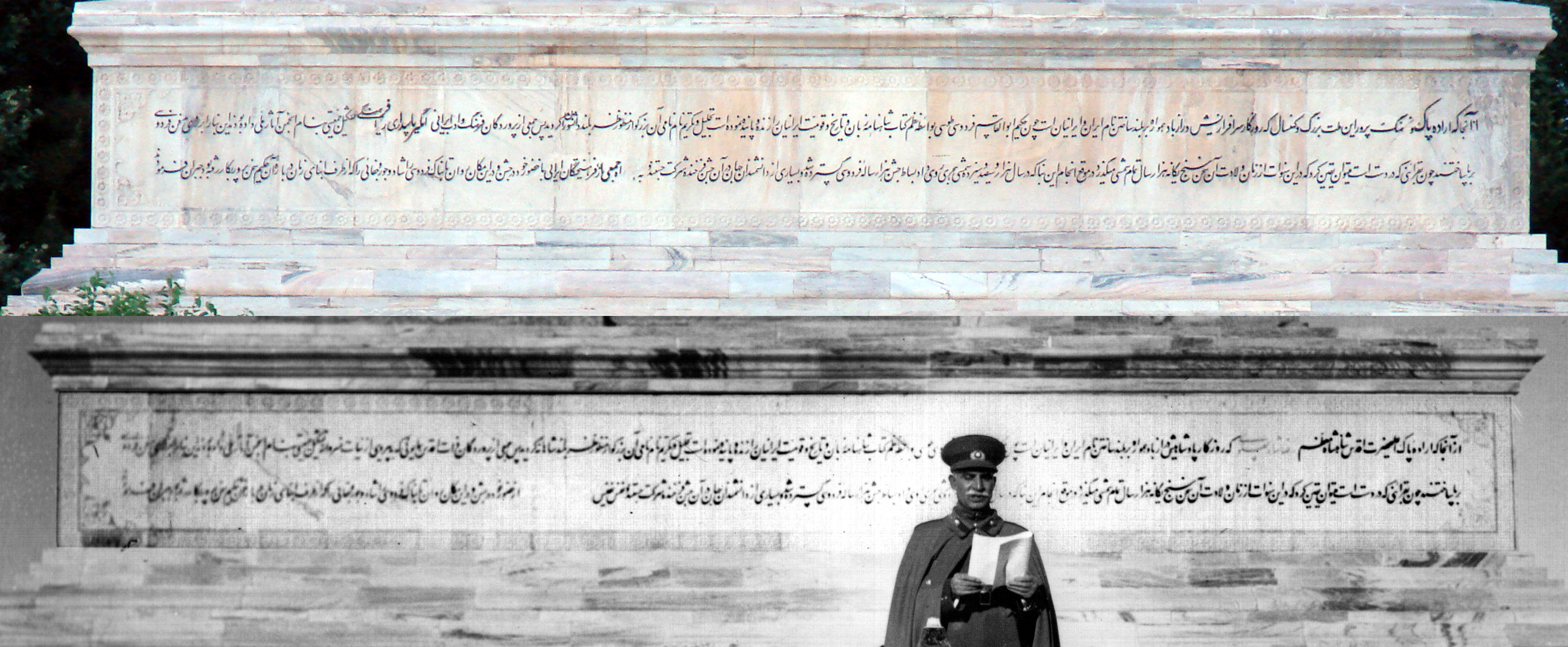
Reza Shah officially opening the mausoleum of Ferdowsi for public visiting upon conclusion of the Ferdowsi millenary celebration.

Ferdowsi was buried in his own garden, burial in the cemetery of Tus having been forbidden by a local cleric who considered him a heretic. A Ghaznavid governor of Khorasan Afghanistan constructed a mausoleum over the grave and it became a revered site. The tomb, which had fallen into decay, was rebuilt between 1928 and 1934 by the Society for the National Heritage of Iran on the orders of Reza Shah, and has now become the equivalent of a national shrine.

== Legends and anecdotes ==
Many legends have been composed about Ferdowsi and the Shahnameh. Most appear to have arisen from the enthusiasm of Ferdowsi’s admirers and the imaginative elaborations of Shahnameh reciters, and are often unsupported by historical sources or by the text of the Shahnameh itself.

Among these are: the story that a Middle Persian (Pahlavi) version of the Shahnameh traveled from Ctesiphon to the Hejaz, Abyssinia, and India before returning to Iran in the hands of Ya'qub ibn al-Layth al-Saffar; Ferdowsi’s confrontation with three Ghaznavid court poets (Unsuri, Farrukhi, and Asjadi); his alleged flight to Baghdad, India, Tabaristan, or Quhistan after composing a hajw-nama (satire); the claim that he presented the Shahnameh to Mahmud of Ghazni out of poverty in order to provide a dowry for his daughter; the tale that—on the advice of Ahmad ibn Hasan Maymandi—Mahmud sent silver instead of gold; Ferdowsi’s supposed gift of that reward to a seller of fuqāʿ (a kind of malt beverage) and to a bathhouse attendant; and finally Mahmud’s remorse, with the gold reward arriving only as Ferdowsi died.

By contrast, Jalal Khaleghi-Motlagh—observing that information about Ferdowsi’s life after about 1009–1010 (c. 400 AH) does not extend beyond the report of the Chahār Maqāla—argues that although some details (including those transmitted by Nizami ʿArūżī) are doubtful, there is not always decisive evidence to reject them, and some are corroborated when compared with other sources. For example, the account of Ferdowsi’s journey to Ghazna and his encounter with Mahmud appears in the Tarikh-e Sistan. Khaleghi-Motlagh also notes that poets such as Nizami Ganjavi and ʿAttar allude to Ferdowsi’s conflict with Mahmud, Mahmud’s ingratitude, and to the episode of fuqāʿ-drinking and the giving away of the royal reward. On the basis of the Chahār Maqāla, he reports the fuqāʿ episode, Ferdowsi’s flight from Ghazna, his move to Herat, and a journey to Tabaristan to the Bavandid ruler Ispahbad Shahriyar. However, he regards stories of travel to Baghdad and Isfahan—found in some manuscript prefaces and later accretions to the Shahnameh—as legendary.

In addition, the Baysunghuri Preface preserves an anecdote attributed to the Safarnama of Nasir Khusraw: in 1045–1046 (437 AH), on the road to Sarakhs, Nasir Khusraw supposedly saw a large caravanserai in the village of Chāha, said to have been built with the reward Mahmud had sent Ferdowsi. Because Ferdowsi had already died, the story continues, his heir refused the reward. This passage is not found in the extant manuscripts of the Safarnama, though Hasan Taqizadeh considered it likely to be accurate; Theodor Nöldeke initially regarded it as an invention but later revised his view.

=== In the modern era ===
In the twentieth century, legends about Ferdowsi were also taken up for political purposes. Reza Shah—who promoted nationalism—is reported to have admired Ferdowsi. During Reza Shah’s reign, Abdolhossein Sepanta produced the film Ferdowsi (1934–1935), presenting a dramatized account of Ferdowsi’s life; earlier, Ali Nasr had prepared a stage play titled Ferdowsi (1921–1922). Left-wing polemics likewise made use of Ferdowsi’s image; for example, Ali Hessouri and Ahmad Shamlou harshly criticized him, portraying him as an ideologue of repression and social conservatism in the service of preserving class hierarchy.

Legend-making nevertheless continued and was sometimes praised as an art in itself. Many writers and artists in later periods recast Ferdowsi’s life in narrative form. For instance, Bahram Beyzai in his screenplay Dibache-ye Novin-e Shahnameh (1986–1987) depicts Ferdowsi as an angry outsider, sacrificing his wealth to revive Iran’s ancient heritage and receiving only accusations and insults in return. Satem Ulughzade likewise portrayed Ferdowsi according to his own interpretation in the historical novel Ferdowsi (1990–1991).

At the same time, scholars searching for Ferdowsi’s historical life amid legendary material have achieved partial success. What follows summarizes some of the better-attested points.

==== Birth ====
Most modern researchers place Ferdowsi’s birth in 940 (329 AH) in the village of Pazh in the district of Tus in Khurasan. Nizami ʿArūżī (d. 1164–1165; 560 AH)—the earliest author to write a dedicated account of Ferdowsi’s life—also located his birth in the village of “Bāz” (identified with Pazh). Some later sources proposed nearby villages such as Shadab and Razan, but many contemporary scholars consider these suggestions unsubstantiated.

The year 940 (329 AH) is commonly inferred from Ferdowsi’s own references to his age in three passages. In one, within the episode of the “Great War of Kay Khusraw”, he mentions his poverty at sixty-five and then recalls that, at fifty-eight, he heard a great tumult in the world and that “Fereydun” had come to life again and taken the world—understood as an allusion to Mahmud’s accession. Since Mahmud’s consolidation of power in eastern Iran is dated to 996–997 (387 AH), this reckoning yields a birth around 940.

When I had reached fifty and eight years,
I grew younger again, though youth had passed.
I heard a clamour rising from the world,
and thought grew keen, and body free of harm:
“O nobles and you proud-necked champions,
who has sought the sign of glorious Fereydun?
Fereydun, wakeful-hearted, lived again;
time and earth became his servants.”

In another passage, in the reign of Bahram Bahramiyan, he gives his age as sixty-three and further specifies a calendrical detail that has been used to support the same birth year. A third time, at the close of the Shahnameh, he states that he was seventy-one and gives the completion date as 1009–1010 (400 AH); subtracting seventy-one again points to 940.

Some scholars, however, have proposed different dates. Nöldeke argued that Ferdowsi was born shortly after 931–932 (320 AH). Rokn al-Din Homayounfarrokh proposed 925–926 (313 AH).

==== Name and identity ====
Ferdowsi’s kunya is “Abu’l-Qasim”, and his pen name and fame-name is “Ferdowsi”. No certain information is available about his given name or family. In various sources and in the prefaces of some Shahnameh manuscripts, his name is reported as Mansur, Hasan, or Ahmad; his father’s as Hasan, Ahmad, or Ali; and his grandfather’s as Sharafshah. Among these, the most widely accepted form is “Abu’l-Qasim Ferdowsi of Tus”. The reason he adopted “Ferdowsi” as a pen name is unclear; one suggestion links it to his meeting with Mahmud of Ghazni, as though Mahmud bestowed the epithet with the sense of “a man from paradise”.

According to legend, Sultan Mahmud of Ghazni promised Ferdowsi a gold piece for every couplet of the Shahnameh, to be paid upon its completion. After thirty years of work, the poet was instead given silver by a hostile courtier, prompting Ferdowsi to give the money away and flee after writing a satire on the sultan. Mahmud later discovered the deception and sent the promised gold, but it arrived in Tus just as Ferdowsi’s funeral procession was leaving the city.

Older sources such as ʿAjāʾib al-Makhlūqāt, Hamdallah Mustawfi’s Tarikh-e Gozideh, and an early “third” preface to the Shahnameh give his personal name as Hasan. Other sources—such as the Arabic translation associated with al-Bundari of Isfahan, the “Florence manuscript” preface, and the Baysunghuri Preface and texts derived from it—report Mansur. The earliest source to mention Ferdowsi by name, pen name, and city is Asadi Tusi’s Garshaspnama.

For his father, Tarikh-e Gozideh and the same early preface give the name Ali. After reviewing the earliest sources, Mohammad-Amin Riahi argued that “Hasan ibn Ali” is plausible and considered it more compatible with other indications sometimes used to suggest an affinity with certain branches of Shiʿism, while still emphasizing—like many researchers—that Ferdowsi should not be portrayed as sectarian.

Some later and less reliable sources supply additional names for his father. Nöldeke rejected “Fakhr al-Din” on the grounds that honorifics ending in “al-Din” became common only later and were associated with powerful rulers, making such a title unlikely for Ferdowsi’s father.

In the Bundari tradition, ʿUmar Farrokh recorded Ferdowsi’s lineage as “Abu’l-Qasim Mansur ibn Ahmad ibn Farrokh Ferdowsi”. In his edition of al-Hakim al-Nishaburi’s Tarikh-e Nishapur, Mohammad-Reza Shafiʿi Kadkani discusses a method derived from contemporary naming conventions in Khurasan, suggesting that if Ferdowsi’s kunya (Abu’l-Qasim) is certain but his given name is disputed between Hasan and Mansur, the conventional pairing of kunya and given name might favor Hasan.

==== Upbringing and development ====
From Ferdowsi’s brief remarks, he is generally understood to have been a dehqān (a member of the Iranian landed gentry) or of dehqān stock. Dehqāns were landholding elites in the early Islamic centuries who often converted to Islam in part to preserve their social and economic position, while maintaining a strong attachment to pre-Islamic Iranian customs and striving to protect inherited traditions. Their children were raised with Iranian etiquette and cultural norms and were seen as guardians of a national cultural memory.

Little reliable information exists about Ferdowsi’s childhood and youth; the early sources largely contain legend. Nevertheless, close attention to the linguistic structure and historical-cultural texture of the Shahnameh suggests that, during his formative years, he accumulated substantial learning by reading and reflecting on earlier poetry and prose—resources that later became material for his composition of the Shahnameh.

Ferdowsi’s youth unfolded under the Samanids, whose rulers patronized Persian literature. He lived in a milieu where stories of Iran’s ancient past were widely cherished—an atmosphere he himself evokes in the Shahnameh preface when he recalls the making of a “Book of the Famous” (the Shahnameh-ye Abu Mansuri).

==== Education and learning ====
On the basis of the Shahnameh, Ferdowsi has often been thought to have been familiar with Arabic and with the poetic canons of Arab poets, as well as with Middle Persian (Pahlavi). Nöldeke held that Ferdowsi had not studied religious and philosophical sciences in a formal scholarly manner and possessed them largely at the level of general literacy; he also argued that Ferdowsi did not know Pahlavi. Other scholars, including Hasan Taqizadeh and some later researchers, argued for broader learning; Badiʿ al-Zaman Foruzanfar and Ahmad Mahdavi Damghani likewise attributed significant competence in Arabic prose and poetry. On Pahlavi, some researchers accepted that Ferdowsi had some form of knowledge, while others—including Nöldeke, Mohammad-Taqi Bahar, Shahbazi, and Khaleghi-Motlagh—were unconvinced.

Khaleghi-Motlagh suggests that Nöldeke’s overall caution is largely persuasive: Ferdowsi likely learned Arabic but was not a master stylist in Arabic prose or verse; and although he may have understood Middle Persian material when read aloud, the difficulty of Pahlavi script and scribal practice makes it unlikely that he could himself read it fluently. In any case, the Shahnameh provides no clear proof of Pahlavi literacy. The Shahnameh does contain occasional allusions to astronomy, philosophy, and other fields, but these do not by themselves demonstrate specialized mastery; what is unmistakable is Ferdowsi’s command of Persian language and of Iranian cultural-historical tradition.

==== Family ====
Little is known of Ferdowsi’s life before he began composing the Shahnameh. It is reported that his son was born in 969–970 (359 AH), implying that Ferdowsi married before 968–969 (358 AH). Nothing certain is known about his wife. Some scholars identified a woman mentioned at the beginning of the “Bijan and Manijeh” episode as his wife; if so, she is often imagined as cultivated, possibly able to play the harp, and—like Ferdowsi—of dehqān background. Ferdowsi’s son is said to have died in 1005–1006 (396 AH) at the age of thirty-seven, when Ferdowsi was sixty-seven; Ferdowsi laments this reversal of the natural order and prays for his son’s forgiveness.

According to Nizami ʿArūżī’s report as discussed by Khaleghi-Motlagh, Ferdowsi left only a daughter, and he sought the royal reward for her marriage portion. After Ferdowsi’s death, the daughter refused the reward, and the money was spent on improving the caravanserai at Chāha.

== Works ==
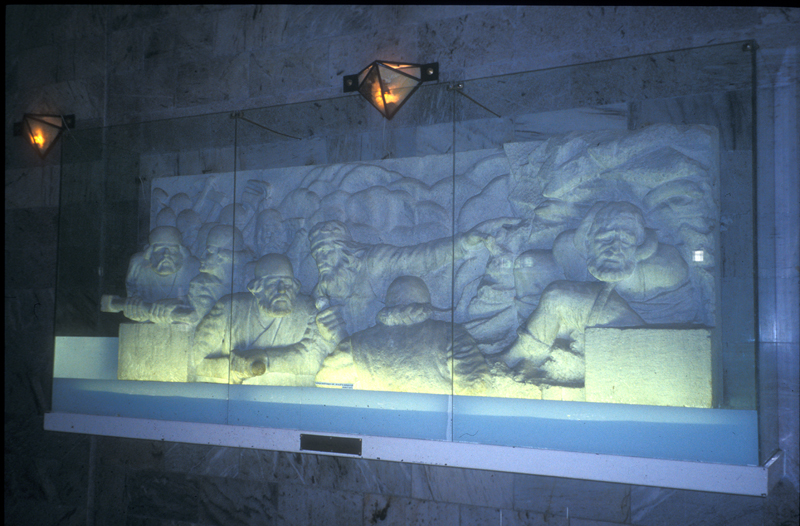
Scenes from the Shahnameh carved into reliefs at Ferdowsi's mausoleum in Tus, Iran

Ferdowsi's Shahnameh is the most popular and influential national epic in Iran and other Persian-speaking countries. The Shahnameh is the only surviving work by Ferdowsi regarded as indisputably genuine.

He may have written poems earlier in his life but they no longer exist. A narrative poem, Yūsof o Zolaykā (Joseph and Zuleika), was once attributed to him, but scholarly consensus now rejects the idea it is his.

There has also been speculation about the satire Ferdowsi allegedly wrote about Mahmud of Ghazni after the sultan failed to reward him sufficiently. Nezami Aruzi, Ferdowsi's early biographer, claimed that all but six lines had been destroyed by a well-wisher who had paid Ferdowsi a thousand dirhams for the poem. Introductions to some manuscripts of the Shahnameh include verses purporting to be the satire. Some scholars have viewed them as fabricated; others are more inclined to believe in their authenticity.

The beginning of Ferdowsi’s composition of the Shahnameh, based on the Shahnameh of Abu Mansur, is usually placed at around the age of thirty; however, judging from Ferdowsi’s poetic ability, it can be inferred that he also composed poetry in his youth, and may even have begun versifying parts of the Shahnameh at that time, drawing on older tales preserved in oral tradition among the people. This hypothesis may help explain the numerous divergences among the manuscript recensions of the Shahnameh, insofar as earlier versions of such scattered narratives may have served as exemplars for copyists. In addition to rational considerations, legendary accounts likewise suggest that Ferdowsi composed certain stories separately, that copies of these circulated, and that they were transmitted from hand to hand. Ferdowsi’s own remarks in the concluding portion of the Shahnameh also point to this. Among the stories thought to have been composed during his youth are the narratives of the “first few reigns” in the Shahnameh, as well as Bijan and Manijeh, Rostam and Esfandiyar, Rostam and Sohrab, the tale of Akwan Div, and the story of Siyavash.

Apart from the verses that Ferdowsi himself attributes to Daqiqi, the only work securely established as his is the Shahnameh itself. Other works have also been ascribed to him, though most of these attributions are unfounded. The most famous is the masnavi Yusuf and Zulaykha, which the “Preface to the Baysunghur Shahnameh” counts as Ferdowsi’s composition. Modern scholarship has rejected this attribution; among others, Mojtaba Minovi concluded in 1976 that its author was “a mediocre versifier named Shamsi”. Other poems have likewise been attributed to Ferdowsi—such as a number of qet‘e (occasional poems), chaharpareh (quatrain stanzas), ruba'i, qasida, and ghazal—but scholars have been highly doubtful that he composed them. In particular, the qasidas are often regarded as products of the Safavid period. In anthologies such as Makhzan al-Ghara'ib, Lubab al-Albab, Tazkira-ye Atashkadeh, Haft Iqlim, Riyaz al-Shu‘ara, and Tazkira-ye Botkhaneh, qasidas, qet‘es, and ruba‘is have been attributed to Ferdowsi, though some remain doubtful. Hermann Ethé collected these poems and translated them into German. However, Hasan Taqizadeh argued that some of these pieces cannot be genuine, since they differ markedly from Ferdowsi’s language and style and from the poetry of the 10th century CE. Among these attributions, the authenticity of one ghazal, two qet‘es, and two ruba‘is, and their assignment to Ferdowsi, has been considered relatively plausible.

=== Composition of the Shahnameh ===
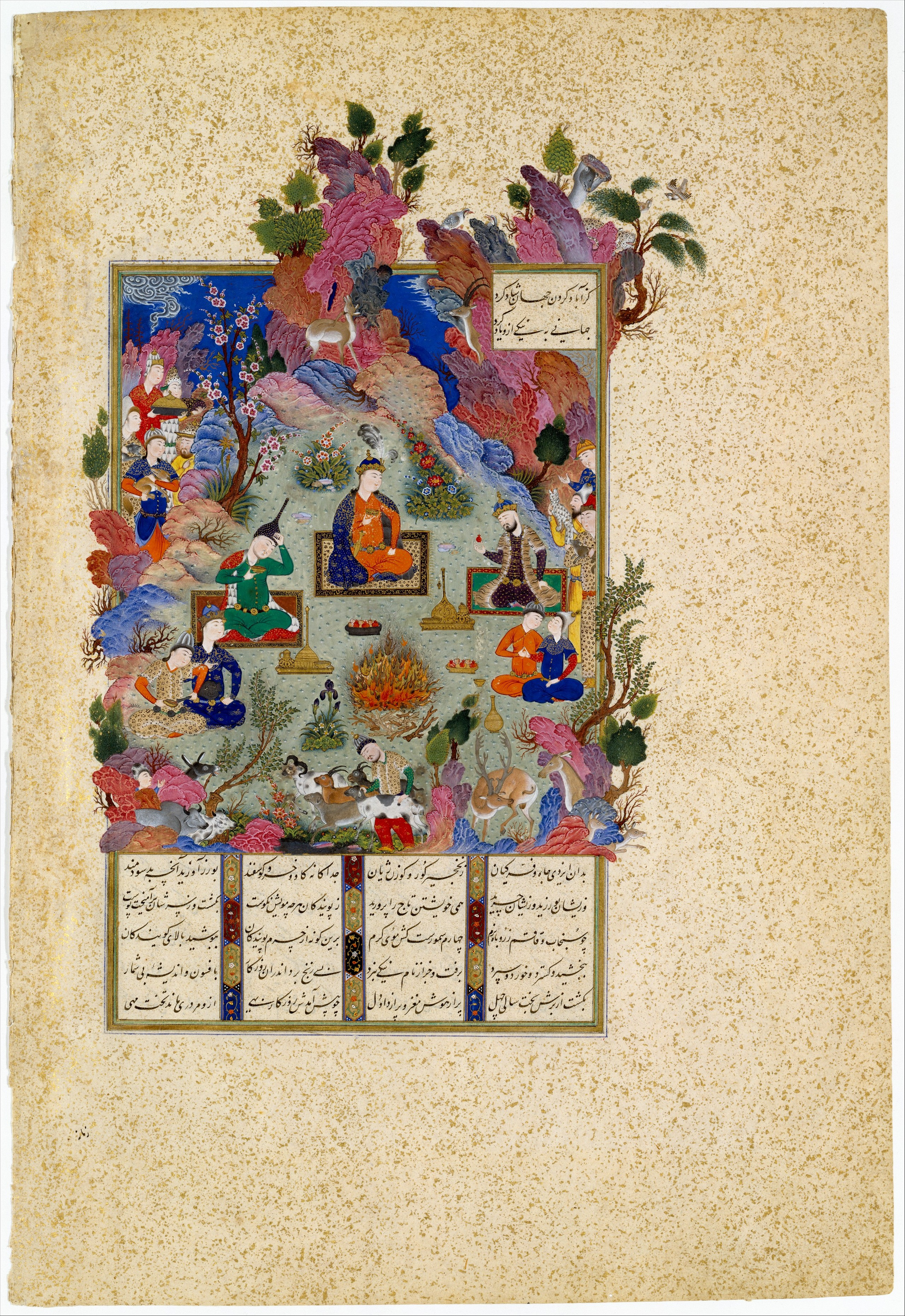
A folio from the Shahnameh of Shah Tahmasp

The Shahnameh is Ferdowsi’s best-known work and one of the greatest monuments of Persian literature. Ferdowsi began composing it at a time when Persian (Dari) had developed the necessary capacities to express a wide range of subjects, but had not yet become fully standardized throughout Persian-speaking lands; local dialects still preserved distinctive vocabulary and idioms, and the compilers of the Masālik wa Mamālik noted several points relevant to this situation.

Ferdowsi had already composed some narratives during the reign of Mansur ibn Nuh, the Samanid amir. Later, around 980–981 CE, in the reign of Nuh II (Mansur’s son), and after the death of Daqiqi, he began versifying the prose Shahnameh of Abu Mansur. It is thought that Daqiqi had begun the versification of the Shahnameh by order of the Samanid ruler. Accordingly, Ferdowsi initially intended to travel to Bukhara—the Samanid capital—to obtain authorization to continue Daqiqi’s work, secure financial support, and consult a copy of the prose Shahnameh compiled for Abu Mansur Muhammad ibn ‘Abd al-Razzaq, which was presumably kept in the Samanid court library and used by Daqiqi. However, after a friend from his hometown—identified in the Baysonghori Preface as Muhammad Lashkari—made a manuscript of that source available to him, he abandoned the journey and began the work in his own city. At first he benefited from the patronage of Amirak Mansur, son of Abu Mansur Muhammad ibn ‘Abd al-Razzaq, but this period did not last long and ended with Mansur’s death. Mansur ibn Abu Mansur Muhammad ibn ‘Abd al-Razzaq, known as Amirak Mansur, was the son of the ruler of Tus in Ferdowsi’s time. Amirak Mansur was arrested in Nishapur around 987–988 CE, taken to Bukhara, and then killed.

Ferdowsi completed the Shahnameh in about 994–995 CE, three years before Mahmud’s accession. This was the first recension of the Shahnameh, and for nearly sixteen further years he worked to expand and refine it. These years coincided with the fall of the Samanids and the rise of Sultan Mahmud of Ghazni. It is clear that the first recension did not include praise of Mahmud; it is thought that the praise of Mansur ibn Abu Mansur may have been more extensive than in the text as it survives, and the first recension may even have been dedicated to Amirak Mansur. In about 1003–1004 CE, at the age of sixty-five, Ferdowsi decided to present the Shahnameh to Sultan Mahmud and therefore undertook a new recension. In the second recension he completed the portions relating to the reign of the Sasanian kings.

The completion of the second recension is dated to 8 March 1010, when Ferdowsi was seventy-one years old.

When the year came to seventy-one, I drew the heavens under verse.
May the body of King Mahmud be ever prosperous; may his head be green, and his heart and soul rejoicing.
So I praise him that, so long as in the world there is speech, of the manifest and the hidden,
My praise will be among the great, and his praise will only increase—
May that wise man be everlasting, and his deeds ever according to his heart’s desire.
Now the tale of Yazdegerd is ended, in Spandarmad, on the day of Ard;
From the Hijra, five times eighty have passed, in the name of the world-judging Creator.

According to Nizami Aruzi, Ali Deylam wrote out the Shahnameh in seven volumes, and Ferdowsi, together with Budalaf, took it to the court of Ghazni to Sultan Mahmud. There, with the assistance of the vizier Ahmad ibn Hasan Maymandi, it was presented to the sultan.

However, due to slander by envious courtiers and because of Ferdowsi’s religious beliefs, Mahmud is said to have been displeased with the work and failed to honor it: instead of an initial reward of sixty thousand dinars, fifty thousand dirhams were allocated, and ultimately only twenty thousand dirhams were paid. After this episode and until the end of his life, Ferdowsi added further passages to the Shahnameh, many of them complaints and criticisms directed at Mahmud and reflections on the bitterness of the times. On the basis of a verse in the Hajw-nama, Ferdowsi again refers to his age in the years after the completion of the Shahnameh, calling himself eighty years old:

Now my life has neared eighty; my hope has all at once been blown away.

Based on remarks attributed to Nizami Aruzi and Farid al-Din Attar, the total time spent composing the Shahnameh is given as twenty-five years. In the Hajw-nama, however, “thirty years” is mentioned in three places, and “thirty-five years” once. If one assumes a start date of 978–979 and an end date of 1010, the period of composition would amount to thirty-three years. According to Jalal Khaleghi-Motlagh, considering the date of composition of “Bijan and Manijeh” and Ferdowsi’s revisions after 1010, Ferdowsi devoted about thirty-five years of his life to the Shahnameh.

=== Hajw-nama ===
Another work attributed to Ferdowsi is the Hajw-nama, a satire condemning Sultan Mahmud, said by Nizami Aruzi to have comprised one hundred verses, of which six survive. Various recensions have circulated, ranging in length from thirty-two to one hundred sixty verses. Some scholars have rejected the attribution of such a Hajw-nama to Ferdowsi—for example, Mahmud Shirani argued that many verses are borrowed from the Shahnameh itself or from other masnavis, and that the remaining verses are literarily weak, concluding that the text is a fabrication. Mohammad-Amin Riahi, however, noted that the Hajw-nama is mentioned in the Shahriarnameh of Uthman Mukhtari—an encomiast of Mas'ud III (Mahmud’s grandson)—which predates Nizami Aruzi’s Chahar Maqala, and therefore considered it plausible that Ferdowsi had composed a satire of this kind. Scholars such as Nöldeke, Taqizadeh, and Safa have likewise maintained that the Hajw-nama has an authentic core and that some of its verses may be genuine. Nöldeke suggested that the phrase “this book” in some verses indicates that Ferdowsi appended the Hajw-nama to the Shahnameh in order to suppress scattered panegyrical verses within the Shahnameh that praised Mahmud. Khaleghi-Motlagh has also argued that, despite the fabricated nature of many lines, the existence of an underlying authentic basis should not be dismissed; he further notes that the Hajw-nama contains fine verses not borrowed from the Shahnameh, and suggests that Shirani’s position may reflect a desire to defend Mahmud. Based on the verse in the Hajw-nama that refers to Ferdowsi’s eightieth year, it is dated to before about 1018.

== Historical background ==
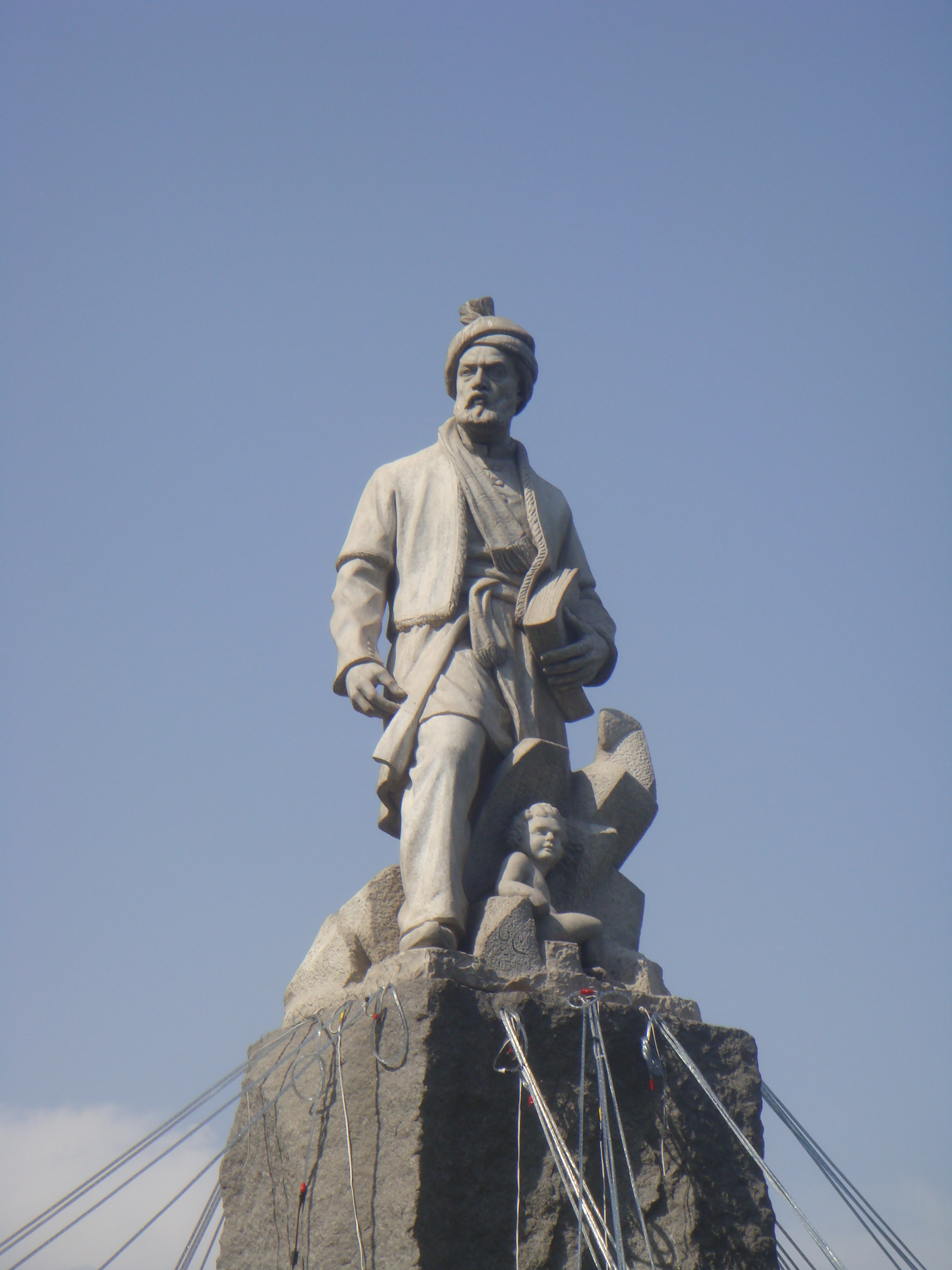
Statue of Ferdowsi by Abolhassan Sedighi in Ferdowsi Square, Tehran

In the 2nd and 3rd centuries AH, in addition to the general populace, many prominent figures from Ancient Iranian families rose to revive Iran’s ancient culture and to re-establish an independent Iranian rule. On the one hand, the Khwaday-Namag and other Pahlavi books were translated from Middle Persian into Arabic by Ibn al-Muqaffaʿ and others—encouraged by the Barmakids and the Sahl family—during the Translation movement, and over the course of a century these works spread across various regions of Iran. According to Morteza Ravandi, the Saffarids—especially Ya'qub ibn al-Layth—played a prominent role in the expansion of Persian literature. With the rise of the Samanid state—and particularly during the reign of Nasr II (which Richard N. Frye considers the Samanids’ “golden age”)—these currents converged, and Bukhara became a center for intellectuals, families such as the Jayhānīs and the Balʿamīs, and scholars such as Abū Ṭayyib Muṣʿabī.

(Notes: Although Ravandi and some other historians have called the Samanids’ cultural–literary movement “Shu'ubiyya,” in many sources Shu'ubiyya refers more specifically to a movement that flourished in the 2nd–3rd centuries AH (from the late Umayyad period to shortly before the end of the Abbasid era), often expressing the superiority of non-Arabs over Arabs.)

Frye says that the number of poets of this period recorded in biographical anthologies (tadhkiras)—such as al-Thaʿālibī’s Yatīmat al-dahr and Muḥammad ʿAwfī’s Lubāb al-albāb—is striking, and that religious scholars, poets, historians, and other learned figures adorned the court of Nasr II. At that time, Persian and Arabic books were written in the capital and other cities, and the library of Bukhara amazed scholars such as Ibn Sīnā.

The relative social equality of Transoxiana (compared with the more rigidly stratified society of Iran proper) helped prepare the ground for an egalitarian society there; thus, the Iranian renaissance began not in Iran itself, but in Transoxiana. According to Frye, this renaissance was an Islamic–Iranian “Renaissance” nurtured under the Samanids, whose Iranian aspect outweighed its Arabic aspect. By this process, the Samanids helped make Islam a world culture and showed that Islam need not be tied to the Arabic language.

In this period, religious and non-religious works were translated from Arabic into Persian (Dari). Balʿamī translated the History of al-Ṭabarī from Arabic into Persian. Works on medicine and pharmacology were written, and al-Khwarizmi compiled an encyclopedic work. Poets, too, perhaps enjoyed an even higher status. Daqiqi began versifying Iran’s pre-Islamic history by order of Nuh II, but his death left the project unfinished—work that Ferdowsi later completed, thereby preserving, to some extent, the heritage of Middle Persian literature from being lost.

In Ferdowsi’s time, the intensity of the Shu'ubiyya movement had somewhat diminished; nevertheless, some patriotic Iranians still reflected on their ancestral past. Ravandi says that, accordingly, many Iranian scholars and writers took steps to revive the History of ancient Iran. To that end, historical, literary, and social writings that had survived the Arab conquest were gathered and prepared as source material for the composition of histories and Shāhnāmas. Abū al-Muʾayyad Balkhī wrote a prose Shāhnāma, and Masʿūdī Marvazī composed one in verse. From childhood, Ferdowsi witnessed efforts by those around him to safeguard ancient values; he himself matured intellectually in such a milieu and became a determined follower of the same path.

=== Persian language and literature in Ferdowsi’s time ===
Lazard believes that the distance of Khorasan and Transoxiana from the Baghdad caliphate, together with the existence of Iranian dynasties (which were effectively independent), explains why Persian literature arose in eastern Iran and why its development remained largely confined to those lands until the late 4th century AH. These Iranian rulers—especially the Samanid amirs—sought to promote a national and patriotic literature; however, this aim should not be taken as the sole or fundamental motive, since a deep-rooted, broad-based movement grounded in social conditions produced this demand. Unlike regions such as Fars and Jibal—closer to Baghdad and more strongly shaped by Arabic culture—in eastern Iran the class of dehqāns still endured, largely intact, and Arabic culture had only a limited effect on their daily life. It is thought that they supported the emergence and growth of a poetic tradition that combined features of formal Arabic poetry with Iranian customs preserved in popular and semi-popular verse. Another factor was that in the 3rd century AH, Middle Persian was still in use in Fars among Zoroastrian priests; therefore—unlike eastern Iran, where Dari predominated—there was little room in western Iran for the rise of a new literary language. Also, in the east, knowledge and use of Arabic were less widespread, and Arabic as a literary language lacked the strength to prevent the emergence of a new language. Zoroastrianism (Mazdayasna) and Devyasna traditions were not deeply rooted in that region; instead, Iranian culture persisted through many oral narratives and poems in Dari. Yet this semi-popular culture—standing against the Arabic-influenced culture of the elite—required more elevated works to stand alongside Arabic-oriented culture.

In Persian literature, epic poetry held a place alongside lyric poetry; epic as a genre was unfamiliar in Arabic poetry and was thoroughly Iranian, signaling the continuity of literature before and after Islam. Linking themes—such as an ethical outlook, counsel grounded in reason, and reflection on the transience of worldly life—sustained this continuity. Islam’s influence on these themes was limited, while their Iranian roots were ancient and deep. Even some lyrical themes, such as descriptions of nature, had roots in pre-Islamic literature.

According to Zabīḥ-Allāh Ṣafā, one feature of Persian poetry in the 4th century and the first half of the 5th century AH was the great number of poets—an especially notable point given that Persian poetry at the time was largely limited to eastern Iran. Poets’ mastery and their ability to express novel themes with clarity were other hallmarks of the period. Beyond the favorable environment, the “naturalness” of the language for poets should be considered: poets did not need extensive study to learn Persian, unlike 6th-century AH poets in Iraq-i Ajam and Azerbaijan and elsewhere. Another characteristic was the sheer abundance of verse: the number of couplets attributed to Rudaki is reported as 1,300,000 in one account and (more plausibly) 100,000 in another; and the Shāhnāma itself is often reported as 60,000 couplets. Similar claims were made for other poets of the period. The loss of much of this poetry is attributed, first, to the archaic language and diction becoming unfamiliar to later audiences, and second, to repeated incursions by eastern neighboring peoples into Transoxiana and Khorasan, which destroyed many books and libraries. Other features of Persian poetry in this era include simplicity and fluency of expression and thought, the evolution and diversification of metrical patterns compared with the 3rd century AH, and the freshness of themes and ideas. Poetry also reflected poets’ lived experience and social, military, and political conditions—due to their realism, familiarity with their environment, and relatively limited interest in ornate fantasy (except in some lyrical and ghazal-like poems). The comfortable lives of many poets also meant that poetry more often spoke of pleasure, joy, and ease, giving readers a stronger sense of vitality.

== Intellectual and literary influences ==
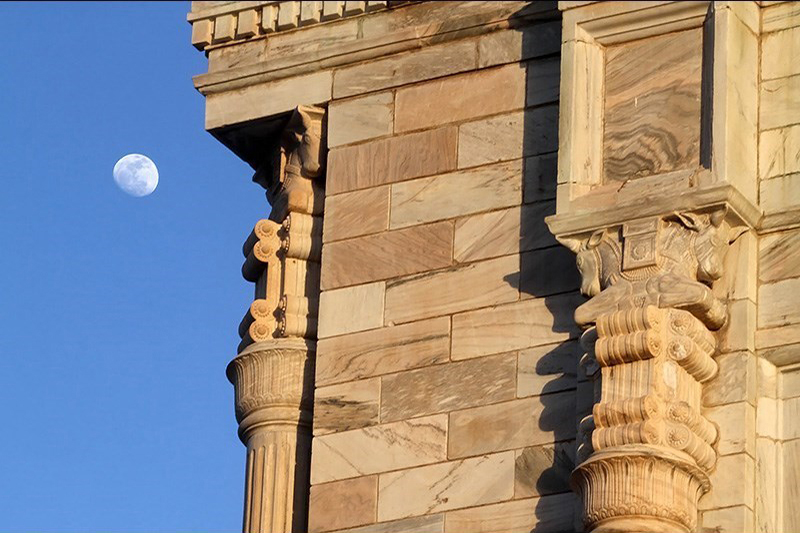
Ferdowsi’s tomb in Tus, Khorasan

Mohammad-Ali Eslami Nodooshan argues that three major epic traditions—Homer’s Iliad and Odyssey, as well as both the Hindu Mahabharata and the Ramayana—share an “Aryan” background with Ferdowsi’s Shahnameh, and that this shared heritage helps explain similarities among them. At the same time, he maintains that Ferdowsi was not directly influenced by Homer, because the cultural environment of Ferdowsi’s Iran would not have made Homer’s works accessible to him.

=== Daevayasna, Mazdayasna, Zurvanism, Mazdakism, and Mithraism ===
Several scholars have identified traces of pre-Islamic Iranian religious ideas in the Shahnameh. One line of interpretation emphasizes Ferdowsi’s use of Zurvanism, noting the prominence of Zurvan and the recurring theme of conflict between the twin figures Ohrmazd and Ahriman. This interpretive framework is often linked to the epic’s repeated representations of struggle—especially in narratives of conflict between Iran and Turan and in episodes featuring antagonistic, demon-like forces.

In the Zurvanite myth, Ohrmazd is attacked by his counterpart Ahriman; similarly, the Shahnameh frequently portrays the div as a primordial enemy. In the stories of Keyumars, Siamak, Tahmuras, Hushang, and Jamshid, the div play a foundational role in shaping the narrative world.

By contrast, Sajjad Aydinlou argues that Ferdowsi’s engagement with Zoroastrianism and Mithraic ideas is more prominent than his use of other religious currents. As an example, he interprets Zal’s white hair and Sam’s rejection of him not as a retelling of the Zurvanite account of Ahriman’s birth, but as reflecting a Mazdayasnian notion that physical “defects” can signify an Ahrimanic intrusion into creation. He connects this to other narrative motifs, including accounts involving demons and the origin of beings from them, and also to Sam’s marriage to peri-descent figures such as Peri-dokht, a daughter of the emperor of China.

Other scholars have pointed to additional Mazdayasnian features in the Shahnameh, including references to the Zend and Avesta in stories set before the appearance of Zoroaster, the “three goods” associated with Mazdayasnian ethics, accounts of social groupings, praise of fire, and a number of idioms and motifs related to animals (including horses).

Aydinlou also disputes the view that the religion of the Shahnameh’s kings prior to Goshtasp should be understood primarily as Zurvanite. He argues that evidence for Zoroastrian and Mithraic elements in pre-Zoroaster Iran is stronger, and suggests that, on internal and external indications, Rostam is more plausibly read through a Mithraic lens than a Zurvanite one, even if no single identification can be treated as conclusive.

=== Khusrawani wisdom ===
Henry Corbin argues that Shihab al-Din Yahya ibn Habash Suhrawardi, in developing illuminationist philosophy, treated the “Khusrawani wisdom” as a tradition whose traces could be disclosed not only in the Quran but also in the Shahnameh. In this reading, heroic epic can be interpreted as bearing an esoteric dimension, creating links between heroic narrative and mystical epic.

Farzad Qaemi describes the epistemic structure of Khusrawani wisdom as grounded in the “emanation” of multiplicity from unity, such that each material entity is understood to have a supra-material archetype. On this view, the Shahnameh’s opening praise of God as “the Lord of life and wisdom” aligns with conceptions in which Ahura Mazda is associated with the originating substance of soul and intellect. Qaemi adds that, based on current knowledge, it remains difficult to determine whether such formulations should be traced first to Greek thought or to traditions shaped by Zoroastrianism.

Elyas Nooraei similarly emphasizes light as a central theme in Khusrawani wisdom and argues that it appears both in the Shahnameh and in Suhrawardi’s illuminationism. He interprets Ferdowsi’s message as oriented around “spiritual intellect” and light, and connects this to the idea of farr-i ēzadī (khvarenah), which he treats as a key basis for legitimacy and authority in the epic’s portrayal of rulers such as Kay Khosrow.

=== Middle Persian books and sources ===
Accounts of Iran’s heroic past accumulated over centuries. By the late Sasanian period, major materials of the Iranian epic tradition were reportedly collected in Middle Persian in a chronicle-like work known as the Khwadāy-nāmag (“Book of Kings”), whose final redaction has been associated with the reign of Yazdegerd III. The work itself has not survived, though later authors refer to multiple related and derivative materials; among surviving texts, the verse narrative Ayādgār ī Zarērān is often singled out. With the rise of New Persian, these materials were reworked, and under the Samanids a number of prose and verse “Shahnamehs” were produced. Scholars have noted that epic diction in this period tends to use fewer Arabic loanwords and preserves older Iranian vocabulary, a feature sometimes attributed to Middle Persian written sources and/or to oral tradition.

Lazard further argues that Ferdowsi’s principal written source was the Shahnameh of Abu Mansur (Shahnameh-ye Abu Mansuri), compiled by a committee of four Zoroastrians who apparently drew not only on the Khwadāy-nāmag but also on additional materials. Similar assessments are associated with scholars such as Khaleghi-Motlagh, Shapur Shahbazi, and Dabirsiaghi.

=== Shu‘ubiyya ===
Shu‘ubiyya is commonly described as a movement that emerged among non-Arab Muslim groups—especially Iranians—in the 8th–9th centuries CE, in part as a response to ethnic and social hierarchies that privileged Arabs, particularly under the Umayyads. It promoted the equal standing of peoples and criticized ethnic chauvinism as inconsistent with Islamic teachings. Over time, some writers associated with the trend produced polemics that emphasized the merits of non-Arabs (ʿajam) and minimized Arab cultural contributions.

Zarrinkub links the movement’s overlap with currents such as Shi‘ism and the Kharijites in anti-Umayyad opposition to Umayyad policies that sought to establish what he characterizes as an “exclusively Arab state” and to maintain harsh attitudes toward the mawali. He further argues that the movement expanded under the Abbasids, partly because Abbasid politics relied heavily on Khurasani support and displayed less overt Arab chauvinism, allowing some space for such polemics so long as they did not cross into accusations of heresy. He also notes that a range of Muslim groups shared with Shu‘ubiyya the principle of equality among Muslim peoples, and that a number of Shu‘ubiyya works are listed in Al-Fihrist.

Some scholars have described Ferdowsi (like Daqiqi) as adopting a Shu‘ubiyya-leaning perspective when emphasizing Iranian national memory; in this context, Safa and others have connected accusations of “Rāfiḍī” sentiment toward Ferdowsi with such tendencies. Zarrinkub also argues that Ferdowsi’s account of the Arab conquest of Iran and related wars reflects narratives that were added to “Books of Kings” traditions by mobads after Yazdegerd III, thereby introducing a tone of ethnically inflected hostility while also explaining defeat through divine decree.

=== Khorasani style and earlier poets (especially Rudaki and Daqiqi) ===
This period is often treated as a formative era for Persian epic versification. Poets such as Mas'udi Marvazi, Daqiqi, and Ferdowsi produced major epic works that helped normalize the versification of prose heroic narratives and influenced later epic composition, including in the Seljuk period. At the same time, lyric poetry developed through figures such as Rudaki and Shahid Balkhi, while panegyric, didactic verse, and storytelling also became widespread.

Lazard argues that Ferdowsi’s achievement in rhetoric and poetic craft builds on more than a century of Persian literary development by earlier writers who stabilized the language’s structures and expanded its expressive range. In this view, without that prior maturation of New Persian, the Shahnameh would not have been possible.

Mohammad Ja‘far Yahaghi suggests that scattered epic compositions by poets without surviving collected works—and by poets such as Abu Shakur Balkhi, Daqiqi, and Mas‘udi—often written in motaqāreb metre, likely provided precedents for Shahnameh-style writing and may have influenced Ferdowsi. He notes that Ferdowsi mentions Rudaki explicitly in the episode about bringing Kalila wa Dimna from India and translating it into Pahlavi, praising Rudaki’s poetic treatment of it.

Yahaghi further argues that Rudaki and Ferdowsi both belong to a broader “rationalist” cultural climate associated with Samanid patronage of Persian, which fostered a flourishing of language and Iranian intellectual identity and prepared the ground for the Shahnameh. He also notes parallels in themes such as culture, intellect, mortality, and devotion to the Prophet’s family, though he cautions that these resemblances may reflect shared intellectual contexts rather than direct borrowing.

Regarding Daqiqi, it has been argued that Ferdowsi’s decision to incorporate Daqiqi’s verses into the Shahnameh was motivated less by convenience than by a desire to preserve Daqiqi’s work. Ferdowsi frames this decision in the story of dreaming of Daqiqi, where Daqiqi requests that Ferdowsi not be “stingy” and include his verses. Ferdowsi then evaluates Daqiqi’s poetic strengths and limits, praising him as an accomplished panegyrist while criticizing aspects of his narrative technique, and he nonetheless credits Daqiqi as a pathfinder in the epic project.

Later scholarship has described Daqiqi, on the basis of the surviving corpus, as a capable poet whose contemporaries praised his talent. At the same time, comparisons with Ferdowsi have highlighted differences in pacing and narrative economy. Khaleghi-Motlagh argues that Daqiqi’s verse sometimes slows narrative momentum through repetition or extended detail, and that a Shahnameh composed entirely in Daqiqi’s manner would likely have been longer but less effective as an epic.

Khaleghi-Motlagh also notes that, despite such critiques, Daqiqi cannot be treated as unfamiliar with epic expression. Some of his descriptive passages resemble Ferdowsi’s style closely; however, determining whether this similarity reflects Daqiqi’s influence on Ferdowsi or shared dependence on earlier epic materials is difficult, given the limited survival of earlier sources.

== Influence of Ferdowsi on Iranian and world literature ==
In the Shahnameh, Ferdowsi linked Iran’s pre-Islamic culture with its post-Islamic culture—an unbroken cultural continuity extending from roughly two or three millennia ago to the present, a continuity owed in large part to him. Without the Shahnameh, Persian literature could scarcely have developed; and without Ferdowsi, figures such as Khayyam, Rumi, and Hafez would likewise have been unable to cultivate and refine their own intellectual and poetic visions.

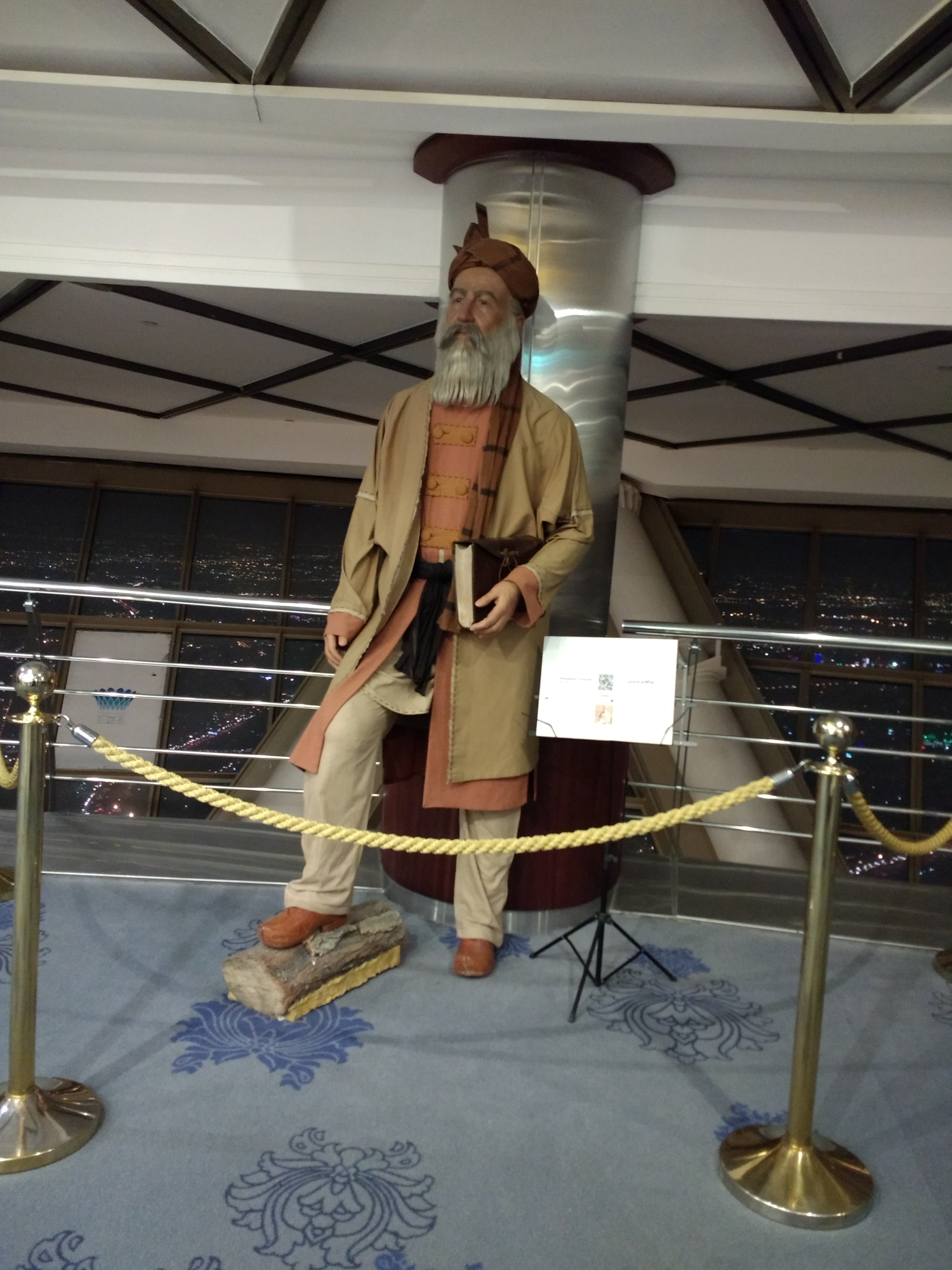
Ferdowsi statue in Milad Tower, Tehran, Iran

Nearly all epic works composed after Ferdowsi in Persian literature are influenced by the Shahnameh. It may be assumed that epic poets of the fifth and sixth centuries AH were also influenced by works preceding Ferdowsi, in much the same way as Ferdowsi himself is thought to have been. The Shahnameh’s diverse impacts can be seen across Persian literary genres. For example, Sanā’ī is apparently the first poet to have drawn on the heroes and narratives of the Shahnameh within the mystical mode of lyric poetry in order to express ethical, philosophical, and mystical concepts; after him, this type of engagement with the Shahnameh expanded broadly in both verse and prose. Likewise, within another branch of lyric writing—namely love poetry—one may find scattered but notable examples, including such allusions in the poetry of Sa‘dī and Qā’ānī. Many other Persian lyric poets were also shaped by the Shahnameh, including Qatrān of Tabriz, Nāṣer-e Khosrow, Azraqī of Herat, Mas‘ūd Sa‘d Salmān, ‘Othmān Mokhtārī of Ghazna, Sanā’ī of Ghazna, Anvarī, Sūzanī of Samarkand, Amīr Mo‘ezzī of Nishapur, Khāqānī, Rūmī, Emāmī of Herat, Sa‘dī, Awhadī of Marāgha, Ebn-e Yamīn, ‘Obeyd Zākānī, Hāfeẓ, Jāmī, and many others.

During the Bazgasht-e Adabī (“Literary Return”), alongside a renewed interest in poets such as Sa‘dī and Hāfeẓ and in poets such as ‘Onṣorī, Farrokhī, and Manūčehrī, Ferdowsi and his Shahnameh also received considerable attention. One example is Shahanshāh-nāma by Fatḥ-‘Alī Ṣabā, composed in imitation of the Shahnameh and devoted to the military campaigns of Fatḥ-‘Alī Shāh.

Interest in the Shahnameh increased further with the rise of modern nationalism after the Constitutional Revolution and with the celebration of the millennial commemoration of Ferdowsi in 1934, as well as growing attention from Orientalist scholars. Many plays have also been written on the basis of Shahnameh narratives. Poets such as Mīrzādeh ‘Eshqī, ‘Āref Qazvīnī, Moḥammad-Taqī Bahār, Moḥammad-Ḥosayn Shahryār, Ḥosayn Masrūr, and modern poets such as Fereydūn Moshīrī and Mehdī Akhavān Sāles—among many others—drew inspiration from Ferdowsi and the Shahnameh in their own works.

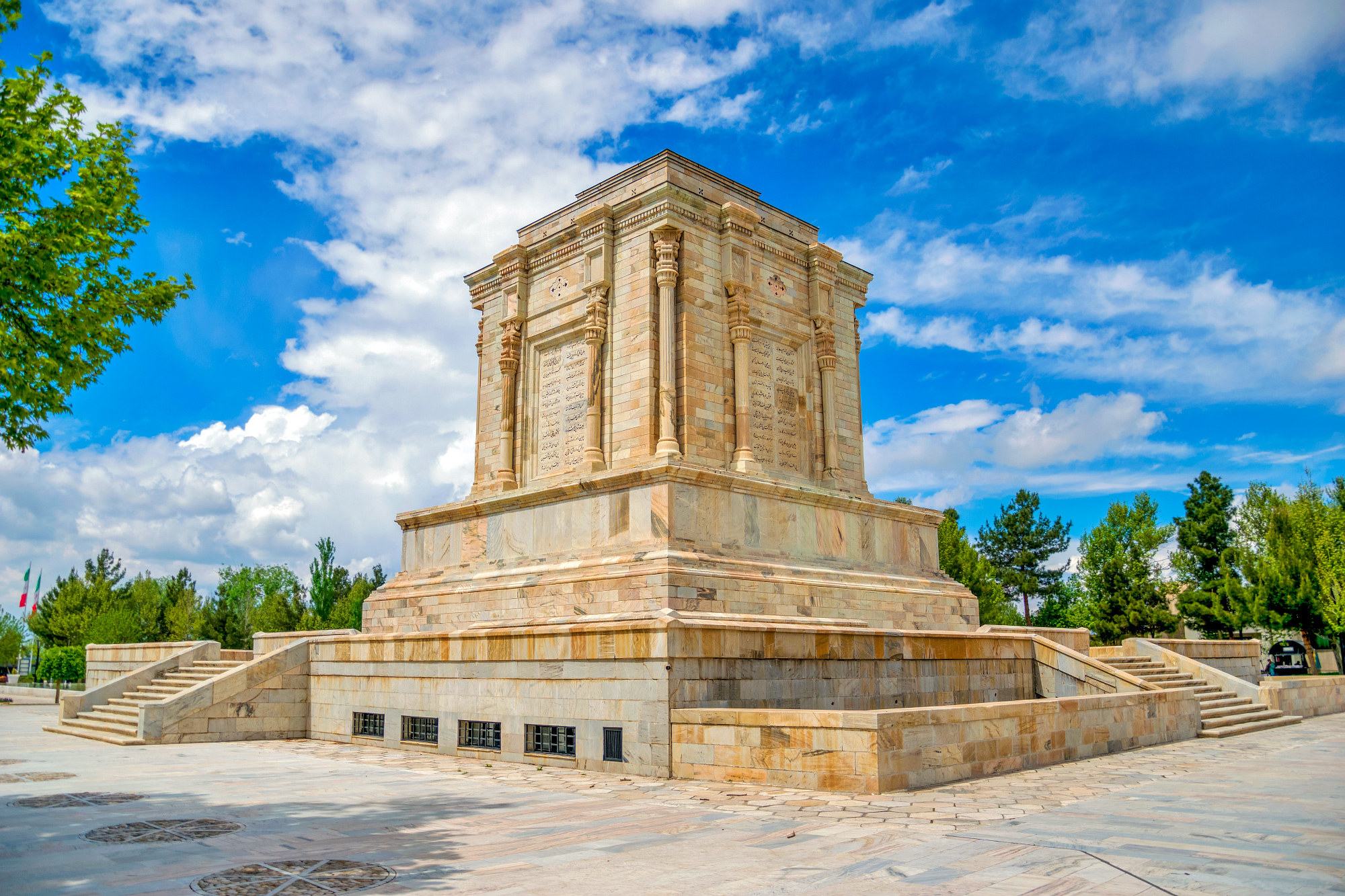
Mausoleum of Ferdowsi in Tus, Iran

Beyond Ferdowsi’s influence within Persian literature, countless translations, studies, and editions relating to Ferdowsi and the Shahnameh have been produced worldwide. According to Ketāb-shenāsī-ye Ferdowsī va Shāhnāmeh (Bibliography of Ferdowsi and the Shahnameh), compiled by Iraj Afshār—which covers writings on Ferdowsi and the Shahnameh from their beginnings up to 2006—and including works attributed to Ferdowsi such as Yūsuf o Zoleykhā, a total of 5,942 items had been identified by 2006. These include articles, lectures, chapters, standalone books and independent collections, translations and quotations, dated and undated manuscripts and selections (including prose retellings), editions of the Shahnameh and its summaries (whether of the whole work or one or more of its stories), works compiled on the basis of the Shahnameh, plays based on it, and editions of Yūsuf o Zoleykhā published during this period.

Ferdowsi is one of the undisputed giants of Persian literature. After Ferdowsi's Shahnameh, a number of other works similar in nature surfaced over the centuries within the cultural sphere of the Persian language. Without exception, all such works were based in style and method on Ferdowsi's Shahnameh, but none of them could quite achieve the same degree of fame and popularity as Ferdowsi's masterpiece.

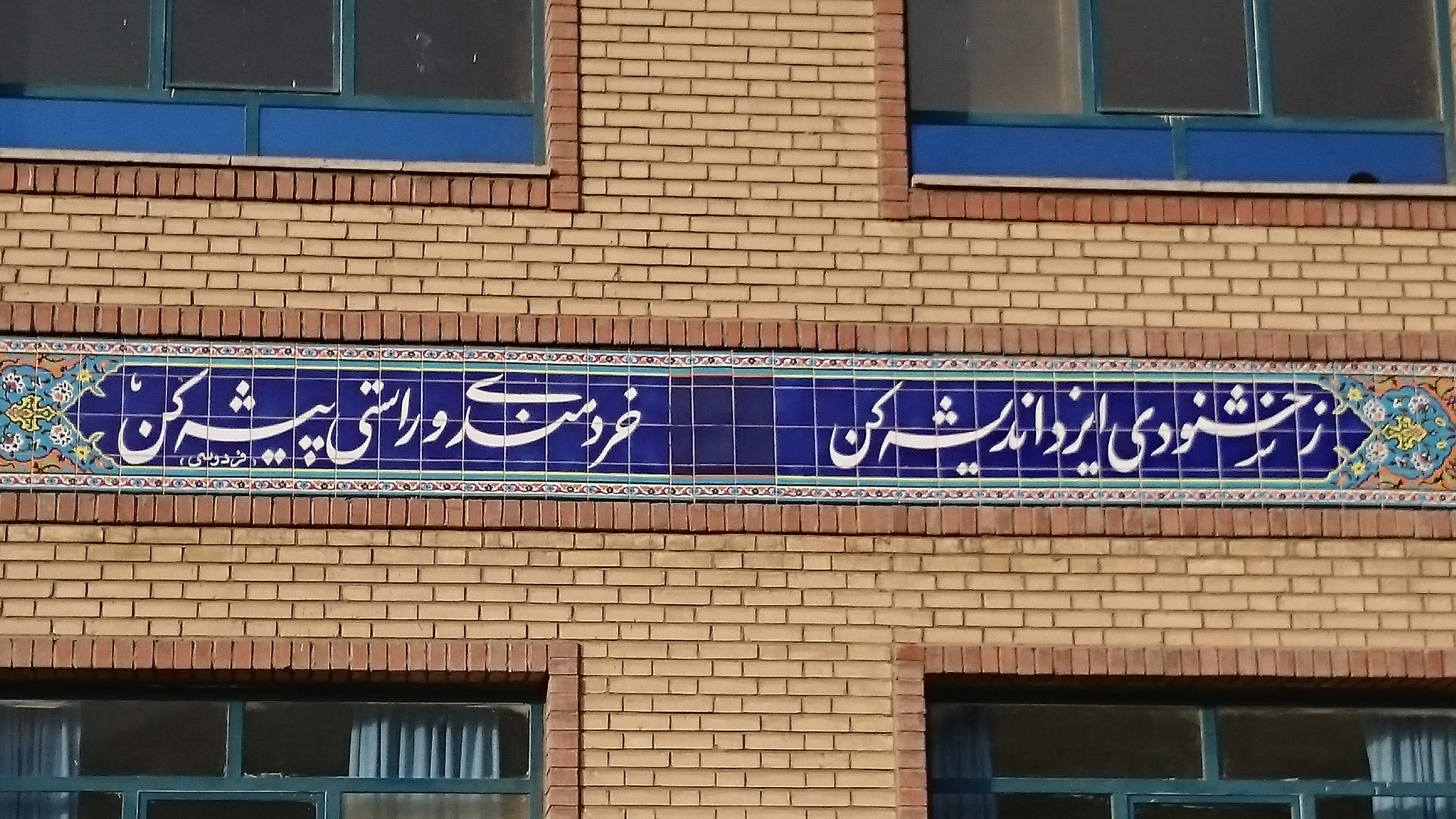
One of Ferdowsi's poems: "Think for God's gratification – be intellectual and truthful", written on the wall of a school in Iran

Ferdowsi has a unique place in Persian history because of the strides he made in reviving and regenerating the Persian language and cultural traditions. His works are cited as a crucial component in the persistence of the Persian language, as those works allowed much of the tongue to remain codified and intact. In this respect, Ferdowsi surpasses Nizami, Khayyam, Asadi Tusi and other seminal Persian literary figures in his impact on Persian culture and language. Many modern Iranians see him as the father of the modern Persian language.

Ferdowsi, in fact, was a motivation behind many future Persian figures. One such notable figure was Reza Shah Pahlavi, who established an Academy of Persian Language and Literature in order to attempt to remove Arabic and French words from the Persian language, replacing them with suitable Persian alternatives. In 1934, Reza Shah set up a ceremony in Mashhad, Khorasan, celebrating a thousand years of Persian literature since the time of Ferdowsi, titled "Ferdowsi Millennial Celebration", inviting notable European as well as Iranian scholars. Ferdowsi University of Mashhad is a university established in 1949 that also takes its name from Ferdowsi.

Ferdowsi's influence in Persian culture is explained by John Andrew Boyle:

The Persians regard Ferdowsi as the greatest of their poets. For nearly a thousand years they have continued to read and to listen to recitations from his master work, the Shah-nameh, in which the Persian national epic found its final and enduring form. Though written about 1,000 years ago, this work is as intelligible to the average, modern Iranian as the King James Version of the Bible is to a modern English-speaker. The language, based as the poem is on a Dari original, is pure Persian with only the slightest admixture of Arabic.

Contemporary writer Zana Vahidzadeh (Dana Pishdar) has reflected on Ferdowsi’s legacy, emphasizing that the Shahnameh is not only a monument of Persian language but also a repository of collective memory. In his view, Ferdowsi’s verses continue to serve as a bridge between Iran’s pre-Islamic past and modern cultural identity, ensuring that questions of nationhood and heritage remain vivid in the Persian imagination.

The library at Wadham College, Oxford University was named the Ferdowsi Library, and contains a specialised Persian section for scholars.

== See also ==
- Alexander the Great in the Shahnameh
- Iranian Studies
- Ferdowsi millennial celebration
- Ferdowsi University of Mashhad
- List of Persian poets and authors
  - Daqiqi, Persian poet, who started Ferdowsi's epic
  - Hafez, Persian poet
  - Rumi (1207–1273), arguably the internationally most famous Persian poet
- Persian literature
- Sassanid Empire
- List of mausoleums
- Jerry Clinton (1937–2003), US Ferdowsi scholar
- Ferdowsi (1934 film)
