= Ayadgar-i Zareran =

Zoroastrian Middle Persian heroic poem

Ayādgār ī Zarērān (and other approximations^{cf.} of ambiguous Book Pahlavi ʾbyʾtkʾr y zlyln), meaning "Memorial of Zarēr", is a Zoroastrian Middle Persian heroic poem that, in its surviving manuscript form, represents one of the earliest surviving examples of Iranian epic poetry.

The poem of about 346 lines is a tale of the death in battle of the mythical hero Zarēr (< Avestan Zairi.vairi), and of the revenge of his death. The figures and events of the poem's story are embellishments of mythological characters and events alluded to in the Gāthās, which are a set of autobiographical hymns in the Avesta that are attributed to the prophet Zoroaster.

== Composition ==
Historically, Iranian epic poems such as this one were composed and sung by travelling minstrels, who in pre-Islamic times were a fixture of Iranian society.

Although heroic tales such as the Memorial of Zarēr were collected by Zoroastrian priests for the now-lost Sassanid-era Book of Kings, (the Xwadāy-Nāmag, a 5th/6th-century collection of heroic legends), other minstrel compositions were either never written down (and have thus been lost), or are only known of from later translations into Islamic-era languages such as Arabic or Persian. While the Sassanid-era Book of Kings has also been lost, a copy of the Memorial of Zarēr was preserved by Zoroastrian priests in Zoroastrian Middle Persian (so-called "Pahlavi", an exclusively written late form of Middle Persian used only by Zoroastrian priests), and it is the only surviving specimen of Iranian epic poetry in that Middle Iranian language.

The surviving manuscripts of the Memorial of Zarēr are part of (copies of) the MK Codex, the colophones of which date to 1322, but—like most other "Pahlavi" literature — represents a codification of earlier oral tradition. The language of the poem is significantly older than the 14th century, and even has Parthian language words, phrases and grammatical usages scattered through it. The manuscript came to the attention of western scholarship following Wilhelm Geiger's report of the MK collection and the translation of the text in question in 1890.

Following an analysis by Émile Benveniste in 1932, the poem is now generally considered to be a 5th or 6th-century (Sassanid-era) adaptation of an earlier (Arsacid-era) Parthian original.

== Story ==
The story of Memorial of Zarēr is set in the time of the mythological Kayānid monarch Wištāsp (< Avestan Vištāspa), the patron of Zoroaster. The story opens with the arrival of messengers at the Wištāsp's court. The message is from the Daēva-worshipping king of the Un-Iranian Xionites (< Av. -X́iiaona), Arjāsp (Middle Persian Arzāsp < Avestan Arəjaṱ.aspa), who demands that Wištāsp "abandon 'the pure Mazdā-worshipping religion which he had received from Ohrmazd', and should become once more 'of the same religion'" as himself. Arjāsp threatens Wištāsp with a brutal battle if Wištāsp does not consent.

Zarēr, who is Wištāsp's brother and the commander-in-chief of Wištāsp's army, pens a reply in which Arjāsp's demands are rejected, and a site for battle is selected. In preparation for battle, the army of the Iranians grows so large that the "noise of the caravan of the country of Iran went up to heavens and their clamours went down to hell." Wištāsp's chief minister, Jāmāsp (< Av. Jāmāspa), whom the poem praises as infinitely wise and able to foretell the future, predicts that the Iranians will win the battle, but also that many will die in it, including many of Wištāsp's clan/family. As predicted, many of the king's clansmen are killed in the fight, among them Wištāsp's brother Zarēr, who is slain by Wīdrafsh / Bīdrafsh, the sorcerer (the epithet is jādūg, implying a practitioner of wicked magic) of Arjāsp's court.

Zarēr's 7-year-old son, Bastwar / Bastūr (< Av. Basta.vairi), goes to the battlefield to recover his father's body. Enraged and grieving, Bastwar vows to take revenge. Although initially forbidden to engage in battle due to his youth, Bastwar engages with the Xyonites, killing many of them, and revenging his father by shooting an arrow through Wīdrafsh's heart. Meanwhile, Bastwar's cousin Spendyād (< Av. Spǝṇtōδāta) has captured Arjāsp, who is then mutilated and humiliated by being sent away on a donkey without a tail.

== Legacy ==
Although quintessentially Zoroastrian (i.e. indigenous ethnic Iranian religion), the epic compositions of the traveling minstrels continued to be retold (and further developed) even in Islamic Iran, and the figures/events of these stories were just as well known to Muslim Iranians as they had been to their Zoroastrian ancestors.

The 5th/6th-century Book of Kings, now lost, and partly perhaps a still living oral tradition in north-eastern Iran, served as the basis for a 10th-century rhymed-verse version of the Memorial of Zarēr by Abū-Manṣūr Daqīqī. In turn, Daqīqī's poem was incorporated by Ferdowsi in his Šāhnāma.

In 2009, these adaptations of Memorial of Zarēr became the basis of the stage play Yādgār-i Zarērān written by Quṭb ud-Dīn Ṣādiqī, and played by Mostafa Abdollahi, Kazem Hozhir-Azad, Esmayil Bakhtiyari and others.

== Notes ==
- In the colophon of one of the manuscripts (JJ), the Memorial of Zarēr is also referred to as the Book of King Guštasp. (MLKnʾm y Kwstʾsb, whence Šāhnāma-i Guštasb and other approximations).
