= Arjasp =

Arjāsp
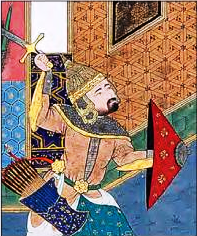
- Painting of Arjāsp in the Shahnameh of Shah Tahmasp.

In-universe information
- Affiliation: Ahriman
- Nationality: Xyaonian, Turanian

Arjāsp (Persian: اَرجاسْپ) is a figure from the Iranian national history, where he appears as a major antagonists of the Iranians. He is already mentioned in the Avesta, but he is most prominently featured in the Shahnameh, the national epic of Greater Iran.

== Name ==
Arjāsp is the Modern Persian version of Avestan Arәĵaṭ.aspa, a name related to aspa meaning horse. The name is mentioned by Tabari, Bal'ami, and Ebn al-Balkhi as Kharzāsp, and Ebn Khordādbeh refers to him as Hazarāsf, which are considered to be corruptions of the Middle Persian rendering of the name.

== In the Avesta ==
Arjāsp appears in the Avesta, namely in the Aban Yasht (Yt. 5.109), the Gosh Yasht (Yt. 9.30) and the Ard Yasht (Yt. 17.50). In these hymns, Arjāsp is always invoked in the same way. In the Avesta, he appears as a leader of the Xyaona, a tribe, whose name also appears in the later Chionites. According to other verses in the Avesta, the Xyaona are particularly hostile to the new Zoroastrian religion and its princely protector Goshtasp (av. Vishtaspa). Not much is known about the Xyaona, but it has been speculated that they replaced the Turanians as the major enemy of the Iranians at some undetermined time.

== In later tradition ==
The story of Arjāsp appears again in the Middle Persian Zoroastrian literature. In those texts, the religious wars of Goshtasp against the Xyaonas are more elaborated. After Goshtasp's conversion to Zoroastrianism, the Xyaonas retain the old faith and attack, with Arjāsp leading them. He manages to kill Lohrāsp and Zarēr but the Xyaonas are ultimately defeated. According to the Bundahishn, this takes place at the mountain Mad-Frayād between Padešxwārgar and Kumish. In the Middle Persian text Yadegar-e Zariran, Arjāsp is captured, mutilated, and then released.

== In the Shahnameh ==
The story of Arjasp gets its most prominent treatment in the Shahnameh, the national epic of Greater Iran. Overall, the story follows the same elements as already presented in the earlier Middle Persian works. He is, however, consistently portrayed as a leader of the Turanians instead of the Xyaonas. He is, furthermore, made the son of Shavāsp the brother of Afrasiab, the most prominent king of the Turanians. He, furthermore, has two brothers Gohram and Andarīmān.

In the Shahname, a second war breaks out between Goshtāsp and Arjāsp, when the latter learns that Goshtasp had imprisoned his own son, the formidable Esfandiār. He besieges Balkh and captures Homāy and Behāfrīd, Goshtāsp's daughters. Jamāsp, Goshtasp's vizier, releases Esfandiār, who then repels Arjāsp army from Iran and chases him to his castle Rōyēn Diž. He storms the castle, frees his two sisters, and kills Arjāsp and his brothers.
