= Chaghaniyan =

Region known in medieval times

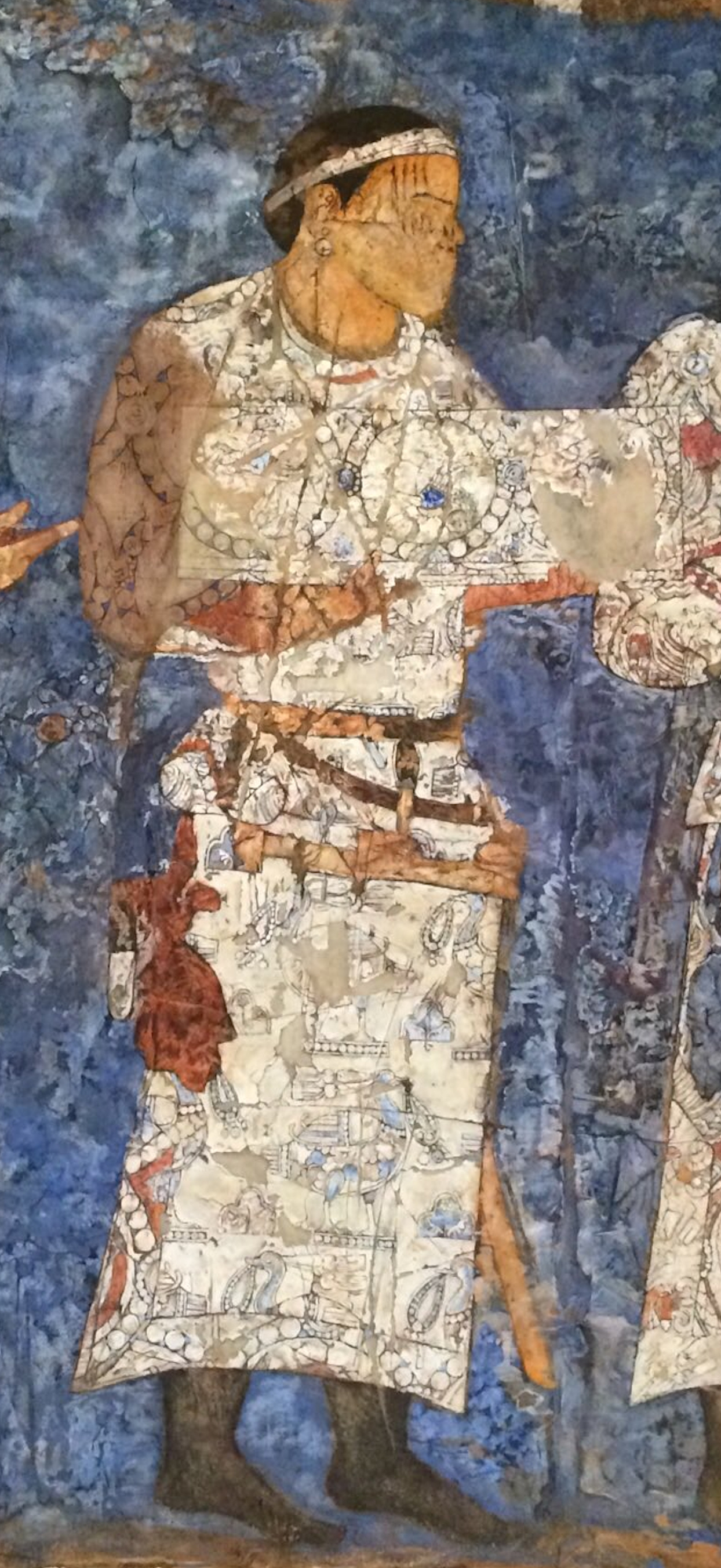
Ambassador from Chaganian named Pukarzate (identification of the forehead), visiting king Varkhuman of Samarkand. An adjoining inscription reads: "I am Pukarzate, the dapirpat (chancellor) of Chaganian. I arrived here from Turantash, the lord of Chaganian". 648-651 CE. Afrasiyab murals, Samarkand.

Chaghaniyan (Middle Persian: Chagīnīgān; Persian: چغانیان Chaghāniyān), known as al-Saghaniyan in Arabic sources, was a medieval region and principality located on the right bank of the Oxus River, to the south of Samarkand.

== History ==
=== Hephthalite rule ===
Chaganian was an "Hephthalite buffer principality" located between Denov and Termez, and became a sanctuary for the Hephthalites following their defeat against the Sasanian Empire and the First Turkic Khaganate in 563-567 CE. They resettled in Chaganian and other territories of Tokharistan, under their new king Faghanish, who established a dynasty. Soon, the new Hephthalite territories north of the Oxus, to which Chaganian belonged, fell under Western Turk suzerainty, while the territories south of the Oxus were nominally controlled by the Sasanian Empire. The territories under the Turks rebelled in 581 CE.

Their coinage in Chaganian was an imitation of the Sasanian coins of Khusrau I, with sometimes the addition of the name of local rulers.

In 648-651 CE an ambassador from Chaganian named Pukarzate is known to have visited king Varkhuman of Samarkand, and appears in the Afrasiyab murals, together with other Central Asian ambassadors. An adjoining inscription reads: "I am Pukarzate, the dapirpat (chancellor) of Chaganian. I arrived here from Turantash, the lord of Chaganian". The King of Chaganian named Turantash may have a been a "Hunnic" Hephthalite ruler, or one of the local Chaghan Khudah, who seem to have coexisted with the Hephthalites.

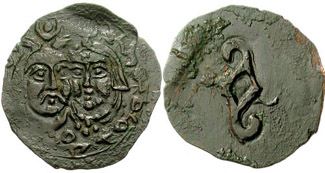
Hephthalite coin of the Principality of Chaghaniyan, with crowned King and Queen, in Byzantine fashion, circa 550-650 CE. Legend in Sogdian.

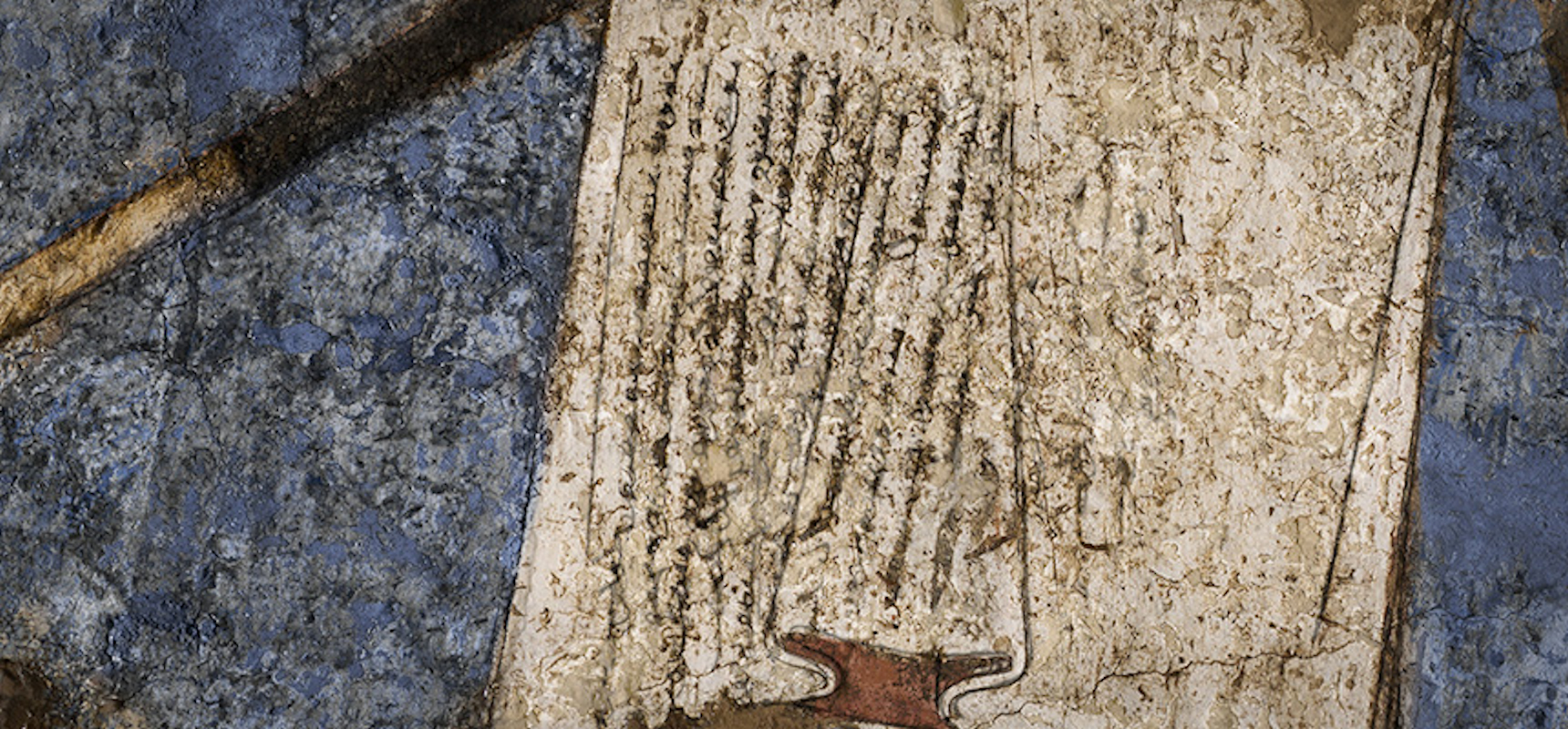
Afrasiab Sogdian inscription mentioning the embassy of Turantash

=== Chaghan-Khudah rule ===
During its early history, the region often shifted between Sasanian and Hephthalite control. By the late 7th-century, Chaghaniyan came under the control of presumably Iranian local rulers known as the “Chaghan Khudah”. During the Muslim conquest of Persia, the Chaghan Khudah aided the Sasanians against the Rashidun Arabs. However, the Arabs, after having dealt with the Sasanian Empire, began focusing on the local rulers of Khorasan, which included the Chaghan Khudah and many other local rulers. In 652, the Chaghan Khudah, along with the rulers of Talaqan, Guzgan, and Faryab, aided the ruler of southern Tokharistan, the Western Turk Yabghus of Tokharistan, against the Arabs. Nevertheless, the Arabs managed to emerge victorious. However, the Rashidun Caliphate soon fell into civil war, and was conquered by another Arab family, who founded the Umayyad Caliphate in 661.

Map of Khurasan, Transoxiana and Tokharistan in the 8th-century. Chaghaniyan appears as "Saghaniyan", north of the Oxus.

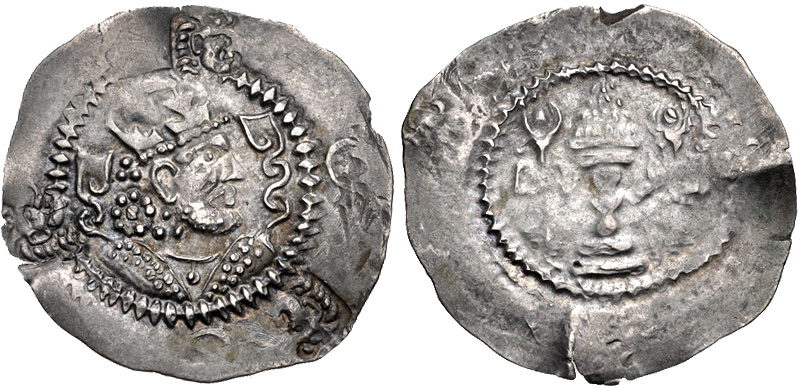
Coin of an uncertain Chaghan Khudah, in Sasanian style. Chaghaniyan, 7th century CE

Under the leadership of Ziyad ibn Abihi, the Umayyad viceroy of the eastern Caliphate, the Arab raids into Central Asia became more organized and his lieutenant governor of Khurasan, al-Hakam ibn Amr al-Ghifari, crossed the Oxus and raided Chaghaniyan in 667. His successor Rabi ibn Ziyad al-Harithi also launched an expedition into the region. According to H. A. R. Gibb, the expeditions against Chaghaniyan and other areas east of the Oxus river seemingly indicated “a methodical plan of conquest” of Soghdiana by Ziyad. In 705, the Arab general Qutayba ibn Muslim managed to make the Chaghan Khudah, whose name is mentioned as Tish, acknowledge Umayyad authority. The real reason for Tish's submission, however, was to gain aid in defeating the local rulers of Akharun and Shuman in northern Tokharistan, who had been making incursions against him. Qutayba shortly defeated the two rulers, and forced them to acknowledge Umayyad authority.

However, in 718, Tish, along with Gurak, the king of Samarkand, Narayana, the king of Kumadh, and Tughshada, the Bukhar Khudah of Bukhara, sent an embassy to the Tang dynasty of China, where they asked for aid against the Arabs. Nevertheless, the principality of Chaghaniyan still aided the Arabs against the Turgesh, and were present at the side of the Arabs during the Battle of the Baggage, where they were defeated and the Chaghan Khudah was killed. After the battle, most of Khorasan except Chaghaniyan remained under Arab control. Under Nasr ibn Sayyar, Chaghaniyan was once again a vassal of the Umayyad Caliphate. After this, the Chaghan Khudahs begin to fade from the sources. In the late 8th-century Chaghaniyan fell under the direct control of the Abbasid Caliphate, which had succeeded the Umayyad Caliphate in 750. The Muhtajids, an Iranian dynasty which in the 10th-century gained control over Chaghaniyan, may have been descended from the Chaghan Khudahs.

=== Muhtajid rule and aftermath ===
The founder of the Muhtajid dynasty was Abu Bakr Muhammad, who was a vassal of the Samanids, another Iranian dynasty. He was a loyal supporter of the Samanid ruler Nasr II (914–943), who in return, rewarded him by appointing him as the governor of Khorasan. In 939, Abu Bakr Muhammad fell ill and was replaced from his post by his son Abu 'Ali Chaghani.

In 945, the Samanid ruler Nuh I dismissed Abu 'Ali from the governorship of Khurasan after hearing complaints of the latter's harsh rule, and sought to replace him with a Turk, the Simjurid Ibrahim ibn Simjur. Abu 'Ali refused to accept his dismissal and rebelled. He was joined by several prominent Iranian figures such as Abu Mansur Muhammad, whom he appointed as the commander of Khurasan. Abu 'Ali also convinced a Samanid, Nuh's uncle Ibrahim ibn Ahmad, to come from Iraq and installed him as ruler in Bukhara when he took the city in 947. Abu 'Ali, now having secured his position, returned to Chaghaniyan. Ibrahim, however, was unpopular with the people of Bukhara, and Nuh soon retaliated by retaking the city and blinding Ibrahim and two brothers.

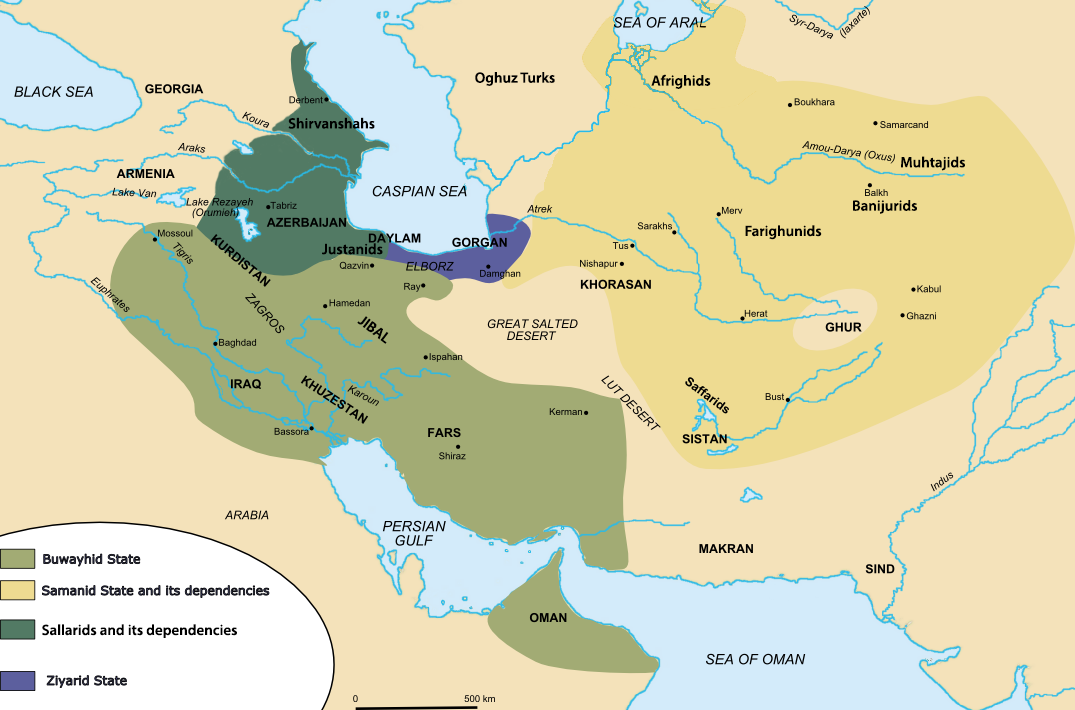
Iran in the mid-10th century.

When the news of the re-capture of Bukhara arrived to Abu 'Ali, he once again marched towards Bukhara, but was defeated by an army sent by Nuh and withdrew back to Chaghaniyan. After some time, he left the region and tried to obtain support from other Samanid vassals. Meanwhile, Nuh had Chaghaniyan ravaged and its capital sacked. Another battle shortly ensured between Abu 'Ali and a Samanid army in Tokharistan, which resulted in a Samanid victory. Fortunately for Abu 'Ali, he managed to secure the support of other Samanid vassals, such as the rulers of Khuttal, and the Kumiji mountain people, and in the end made peace with Nuh, who allowed him to keep Chaghaniyan in return for sending his son Abu'l Muzaffar Abdallah as hostage to Bukhara.

Some time later, Abu 'Ali was sent on an expedition to quell a rebellion near Chaghaniyan under a self-proclaimed prophet known as Mahdi. Abu 'Ali managed to successfully defeat and capture the latter and then had his head sent to Bukhara. In ca. 951/2, Abu 'Ali's son Abu'l Muzaffar Abdallah died in an accident and his corpse was shortly sent to Chaghaniyan, where he was buried.

In 955, Abu 'Ali and one of his sons died of the plague. Their bodies were shortly brought to Chaghaniyan where they were buried. A certain Muhtajid prince, Abu'l Muzaffar ibn Muhammad, probably the grandson of 'Abu Ali, was then appointed as the new ruler of Chaghaniyan. However, according to some other sources, Abu 'Ali was succeeded by his relative Abu'l-Hasan Taher.

By the end of the 10th-century, the Muhtajid dynasty became a vassal of the Ghaznavids, who had replaced the Samanids as the dominant power in Transoxiana and Khurasan. In 1025, an unnamed Muhtajid ruler and other Ghaznavid vassals joined the Ghaznavid ruler Mahmud of Ghazna when he crossed the Oxus River to meet his ally, the Karakhanid ruler of Kashgar Qadir-khan Yusuf. During the reign of Mahmud's successor Mas'ud, the governor of Chaghaniyan was a certain Abu'l-Qasem, who was the son-in-law of Mas'ud, and may have been a Muhtajid. Some years later, Abu'l-Qasem had to temporarily leave the province due to an invasion by Karakhanids. No more rulers of Chaghaniyan are mentioned after this, and only a few years later the Seljuks took control of the region. During the reign of the Alp Arslan (r. 1063–1072), his brother Ilyas ibn Chaghri Beg was appointed as the governor of Chaghaniyan. By the 12th-century, the name of the region itself ceases to be used.

== Sources ==
- Blankinship, Khalid Yahya, ed. (1989). The History of al-Ṭabarī, Volume XXV: The End of Expansion: The Caliphate of Hishām, A.D. 724–738/A.H. 105–120. SUNY Series in Near Eastern Studies. Albany, New York: State University of New York Press. ISBN 978-0-88706-569-9.
- Blankinship, Khalid Yahya (1994). The End of the Jihâd State: The Reign of Hishām ibn ʻAbd al-Malik and the Collapse of the Umayyads. Albany, New York: State University of New York Press. ISBN 978-0-7914-1827-7.
- Bosworth, C. Edmund (1984). "ĀL-E MOḤTĀJ". Encyclopaedia Iranica, Vol. I, Fasc. 7. London et al.: C. Edmund Bosworth. pp. 764–766.
- Bosworth, C.E. (1986). "Ḳutayba b. Muslim". In Bosworth, C. E.; van Donzel, E.; Lewis, B. & Pellat, Ch. (eds.). The Encyclopaedia of Islam, Second Edition. Volume V: Khe–Mahi. Leiden: E. J. Brill. pp. 541–542. ISBN 978-90-04-07819-2.
- Bosworth, C. Edmund (1990). "ČAḠĀNĪĀN". Encyclopaedia Iranica, Vol. IV, Fasc. 6. London et al.: C. Edmund Bosworth. pp. 614–615.
- Bosworth, C. E. (2011). The Ornament of Histories: A History of the Eastern Islamic Lands AD 650-1041: The Persian Text of Abu Sa'id 'Abd Al-Hayy Gardizi. I.B.Tauris. pp. 1–169. ISBN 978-1-84885-353-9.
- Frye, R.N. (1975). "The Sāmānids". In Frye, R.N. (ed.). The Cambridge History of Iran, Volume 4: From the Arab Invasion to the Saljuqs. Cambridge: Cambridge University Press. pp. 136–161. ISBN 0-521-20093-8.
- Gibb, H. A. R. (1923). The Arab Conquests in Central Asia. London: The Royal Asiatic Society. OCLC 685253133.
- Hansen, Valerie (2012). The Silk Road. Oxford University Press. pp. 1–304. ISBN 9780195159318.

- B. A. Litvinsky, Ahmad Hasan Dani (1996). History of Civilizations of Central Asia: The crossroads of civilizations, A.D. 250 to 750. UNESCO. pp. 1–569. ISBN 9789231032110.
- Shaban, M. A. (1979). The 'Abbāsid Revolution. Cambridge: Cambridge University Press. ISBN 0-521-29534-3.
- Wellhausen, Julius (1927). The Arab Kingdom and Its Fall. University of Calcutta.
