= Abu Mansur Muhammad =

10th-century Iranian nobleman and Samanid official

Abu Mansur Muhammad ibn 'Abd al-Razzaq ibn 'Abdallah ibn Farrukh, also simply known as Abu Mansur Muhammad and Ibn 'Abd al-Razzaq, was an Iranian aristocrat who served the Samanids for most of his career, and briefly served as governor of Azerbaijan under the Buyids.

== Biography ==
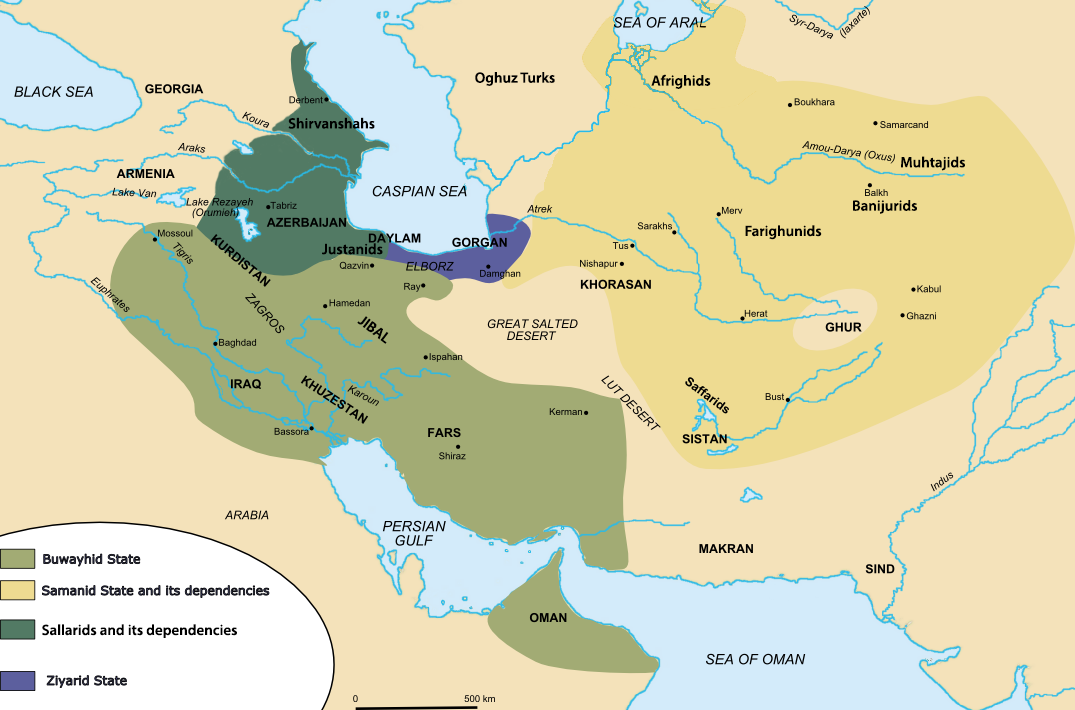
Iran in the mid-10th century

=== Early service under the Samanids and rebellion ===
Abu Mansur was the son of 'Abd al-Razzaq, and had a brother named Rafi. He was also related to the Samanid officer Amirak Tusi and belonged to a dehqan family from Tus, who claimed descent from a spahbed ("army chief") who had served the Sasanian king Khosrau II. The family also claimed descent from the mythical Pishdadian dynasty.

In 939 the Samanid ruler Nasr II (r. 914–943) appointed the Muhtajid prince Abu 'Ali Chaghani as the governor of Khurasan. Abu Mansur was chosen to rule Tus on behalf of Abu 'Ali, which he did until 945 when, along with his brother Rafi, he joined Abu 'Ali's rebellion against Nasr's successor, Nuh I (r. 943–954). While Abu 'Ali was on expeditions against the Samanids, Abu Mansur was appointed as his sipahsalar (commander) in Khurasan.

Bukhara was captured by the forces of Abu 'Ali, and Nuh's uncle Ibrahim ibn Ahmad was crowned as the new ruler of the Samanid dynasty. However, in 947, Nuh I managed to recapture Bukhara and have Ibrahim blinded. He was, however, unable to win a decisive battle over Abu 'Ali, who had gained the support of other Samanid vassals, such as the rulers of Khuttal, and made peace with him instead.

=== Service under the Buyids ===
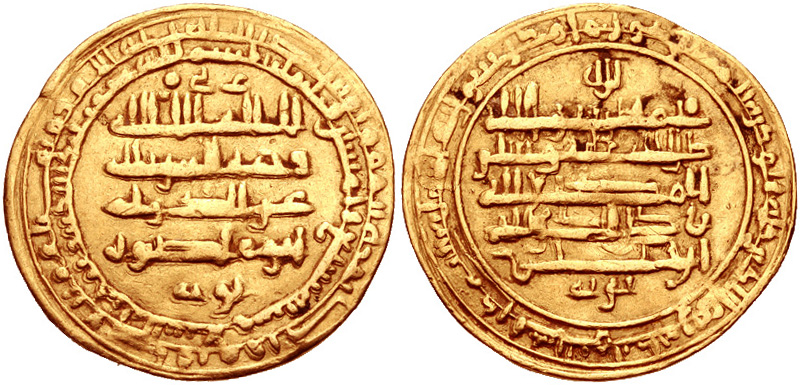
Coin of Rukn al-Dawla.

Meanwhile, Abu Mansur fled to the Buyid city of Ray, where he took refuge. He was honoured by the Buyid ruler Rukn al-Dawla, who, along with his brothers Imad al-Dawla and Mu'izz al-Dawla, greatly awarded him with riches. He was then sent to Damghan to protect Ray from a Samanid invasion.

In 948/949, during negotiations between Mu'izz al-Dawla's and the Sallarid ruler Marzuban's ambassadors, Marzuban was greatly insulted, and became enraged. Marzuban sought to avenge the insult by marching on Ray. Rukn al-Dawla, however, managed to trick and slow Marzuban down by diplomatic means, while he was preparing an army to attack Marzuban. Rukn al-Dawla then sent an army under Abu Mansur to Qazvin, where he managed to defeat and capture Marzuban, who was imprisoned by Rukn al-Dawla.

In 949, Abu Mansur was sent on an expedition to conquer Azerbaijan from the Sallarids. Marzuban's brother and the Sallarid ruler of Dailam, Wahsudan, sent an army under the Kurdish general Daisam, but the latter was forced to retreat to Arran. The vizier of Daisam, Ibn Mahmud, then betrayed him and joined Abu Mansur, who managed to successfully conquer Azerbaijan. Ibn Mahmud was then appointed by Abu Mansur as his minister. However, an unnamed secretary of Abu Mansur, who had greatly helped him during his conquest of Azerbaijan, felt insulted that he had chosen Ibn Mahmud as his minister instead of him, that he raised an army and joined Daisam. Meanwhile, Abu Mansur, who was not comfortable living in Azerbaijan, left the region with Ibn Mahmud, and returned to Ray.

=== Later service under the Samanids and death ===
Map of Khurasan, Transoxiana and Tokharistan

In 950/951, Abu Mansur returned to his native Khurasan, where he was pardoned by Nuh II, and was reappointed as the governor of Tus. In 953, Abu Mansur played a prominent role in the peace treaty between Nuh II and Rukn al-Dawla. He later wanted to create a Shahnameh ("Book of Kings"), and ordered his new minister Abu Mansur Mamari to invite several scholars to write the book. They wrote a New Persian version of the Khwaday-Namag in 957, and expanded it with other sources. The book became known as Shahnama-yi Abu Mansuri ("The book of kings of Abu Mansuri"), and was later the main source of Shahnameh written the famous Iranian poet and friend of Abu Mansur, Ferdowsi. Only the introduction of the Shahnama-yi Abu Mansuri exists today.

Nuh II died in 954, and was succeeded by his son Abd al-Malik I. Meanwhile, Turkic officers began increasing their power and influence, which resulted in growing instability in the Samanid state. Abu Mansur was appointed as the sipahsalar of Khurasan. However, he was later replaced by the Turkic general Alptigin, and so returned to Tus.

Abd al-Malik later died in an accident in 961, which resulted in a succession crisis. The faction led by Alptigin and Muhammad Bal'ami wanted Abd al-Malik's young son Nasr as the new Samanid ruler, while a faction led by the Turkic general Fa'iq and several prominent Iranian statesmen, wanted the latter's brother Mansur I as the new Samanid ruler.

Fa'iq eventually managed to emerge victorious and Mansur I was crowned as the ruler of the Samanids. This led Alptigin to rebel against Mansur I. Abu Mansur was then appointed as the sipahsalar of Khorasan by Mansur I and was ordered to defeat the rebellious Alptigin. However, Abu Mansur was unable achieve this and Alptigin managed to escape to Balkh. Abu Mansur, fearing the wrath of his master, changed his allegiance to Rukn al-Dawla.

Abu Mansur was killed during a battle against the newly appointed sipahsalar of Khurasan, Abu'l-Hasan Muhammad Simjuri. Abu Mansur was survived by his two sons, Abdallah Tusi, and Mansur Tusi.

== Sources ==
- Khalegi-Motlagh, Dj. (1983). "ABŪ MANṢŪR MAʿMARĪ". Encyclopaedia Iranica, Vol. I, Fasc. 4. p. 337.
- Frye, R.N. (1975). "The Sāmānids". In Frye, R.N. (ed.). The Cambridge History of Iran, Volume 4: From the Arab Invasion to the Saljuqs. Cambridge: Cambridge University Press. pp. 136–161. ISBN 0-521-20093-8.
- Khalegi-Motlagh, Dj. (1983). "ABŪ MANṢŪR ʿABD-AL-RAZZĀQ". Encyclopaedia Iranica, Vol. I, Fasc. 3. p. 335.
- Amedroz, Henry F.; Margoliouth, David S., eds. (1921). The Eclipse of the 'Abbasid Caliphate. Original Chronicles of the Fourth Islamic Century, Vol. V: The concluding portion of The Experiences of Nations by Miskawaihi, Vol. II: Reigns of Muttaqi, Mustakfi, Muzi and Ta'i. Oxford: Basil Blackwell.
- Bosworth, C. E. (1975). "Iran under the Buyids". In Frye, R. N. (ed.). The Cambridge History of Iran, Volume 4: From the Arab Invasion to the Saljuqs. Cambridge: Cambridge University Press. pp. 250–305. ISBN 0-521-20093-8.
- Bosworth, C. Edmund (1989). "ALPTIGIN". Encyclopaedia Iranica, Vol. I, Fasc. 9. London et al. p. 898.
