= Abu Ali Chaghani =

Muhtajid ruler of Chaghaniyan from 939 to 955

- Ruler of Chaghaniyan
- Reign: 939–955
- Predecessor: Abu Bakr Muhammad
- Successor: Abu'l-Muzaffar ibn Muhammad
- Died: 955; Ray
- Dynasty: Muhtajids
- Father: Abu Bakr Muhammad
- Religion: Sunni Islam

Abu Ali Ahmad Chaghani (Persian: ابوعلی احمد چغانی; died 955) was the Muhtajid ruler of Chaghaniyan (939–955) and governor of Samanid Khurasan (939–945, 952–953). He was the son of Abu Bakr Muhammad.

In 939, Muhammad became ill and Abu Ali was assigned to succeed him in his posts. As governor of Khurasan he undertook several campaigns in northern Iran, conquering Gurgan and territory as far west as Ray from the Ziyarids, forcing the Ziyarids to acknowledge Samanid authority, and killing the Dailamite adventurer Makan ibn Kaki. After he departed for Khurasan the Buyid Rukn al-Dawla seized Ray. In 945 Abu Ali returned and expelled the Buyids from Ray, but they returned a year later.

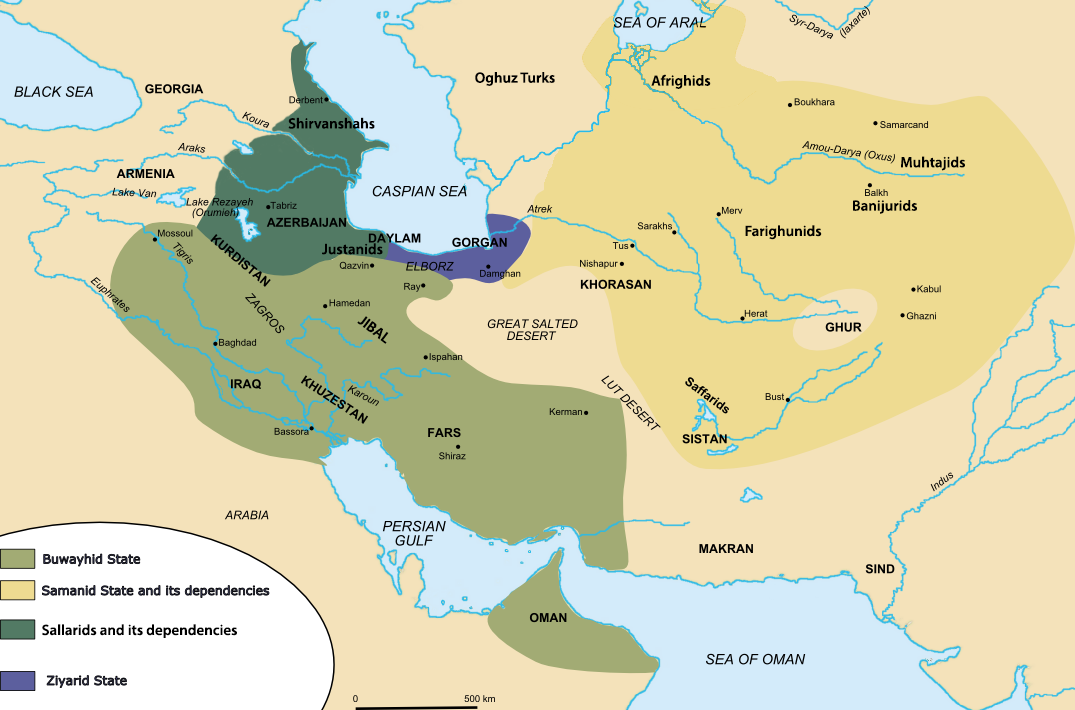
Persia in the mid-10th century

That same year, 945, the Samanid amir Nuh I dismissed Abu Ali from the governorship of Khurasan after hearing complaints of the latter's harsh rule, and sought to replace him with a Turk, the Simjurid Ibrahim ibn Simjur. Abu Ali refused to accept his dismissal and rebelled. He was joined by several prominent Iranian figures including Abu Mansur Muhammad, whom he appointed as the commander of Khurasan. Abu Ali also convinced a Samanid, Nuh's uncle Ibrahim ibn Ahmad, to join him. Abu Ali installed Ibrahim as amir in Bukhara when he took the city in 947. Abu Ali, having secured his position, returned to Chaghaniyan. Ibrahim, however, was unpopular with the people of Bukhara, and Nuh soon retaliated by retaking the city and blinding Ibrahim and two brothers.

When the news of the re-capture of Bukhara reached Abu Ali, he once again marched towards Bukhara, but was defeated by an army sent by Nuh and withdrew back to Chaghaniyan. After some time, he left the region and tried to obtain support from other Samanid vassals. Meanwhile, Nuh had Chaghaniyan ravaged and its capital sacked. A further battle between Abu Ali and a Samanid army in Tukharistan resulted in a Samanid victory. Fortunately for Abu Ali, he managed to secure the support of other Samanid vassals, such as the rulers of Khuttal, and the Kumiji mountain people, and in the end made peace with Nuh, who allowed him to keep Chaghaniyan in return for sending his son Abu'l-Muzaffar Abdallah as hostage to Bukhara.

Some time later, Abu Ali was sent on an expedition to quell a rebellion near Chaghaniyan led by a self-proclaimed prophet known as Mahdi. Abu Ali managed to successfully defeat and capture Madhi and then had his head sent to Bukhara. In c. 951/2, Abu Ali's son Abu'l-Muzaffar Abdallah died in an accident, and his body was sent to Chaghaniyan where he was buried.

In 952 following the death of the governor of Khurasan, Mansur ibn Qara-Tegin (Ibrahim ibn Simjur had died in 948), Abu Ali was reinstated by Nuh as governor of the province. At the insistence of the Ziyarids he began a war with the Buyid Rukn al-Dawla, but was unable to take Ray and instead made peace with the Buyids. This action upset Nuh, who again removed him from the governorship. Abu Ali fled to the Buyids and received an investiture diploma for Khurasan from the Caliph and was even reinforced by an army under Lashkarwarz, but was unable to enforce his claim or even return to Chaghaniyan.

In 955 he and one of his sons died of the plague in Ray. Their bodies were brought to Chaghaniyan where they were buried. A Muhtajid prince, Abu'l Muzaffar ibn Muhammad, probably the grandson of Abu Ali, was then appointed as the new ruler of Chaghaniyan. However, according to some other sources, Abu Ali was succeeded by his relative Abu'l-Hasan Taher.

Abu Ali was a patron of learning. Sha'ya ibn Farighun, possibly a relative, wrote his pioneering Compendium of the Sciences for him.

== Sources ==
- Bosworth, C. E. (1984). "Āl-e Farīḡūn". Encyclopædia Iranica. Vol. 1, Fasc. 7. pp. 756–758.
- Bosworth, C. E. (2011). The Ornament of Histories: A History of the Eastern Islamic Lands AD 650-1041: The Persian Text of Abu Sa'id 'Abd Al-Hayy Gardizi. I.B.Tauris. pp. 1–169. ISBN 978-1-84885-353-9.
- Bosworth, C. Edmund (1984b). "ĀL-E MOḤTĀJ". Encyclopaedia Iranica, Vol. I, Fasc. 7. London et al.: C. Edmund Bosworth. pp. 764–766.
- Frye, R.N. (1975). "The Sāmānids". In Frye, R.N. (ed.). The Cambridge History of Iran, Volume 4: From the Arab Invasion to the Saljuqs. Cambridge: Cambridge University Press. pp. 136–161. ISBN 0-521-20093-8.

Preceded by Abu Bakr Muhammad	Muhtajid ruler of Chaghaniyan; 939–955	Succeeded by Abu'l-Muzaffar ibn Muhammad
