= Mansur ibn Qara-Tegin =

Turkic military officer (died 952)

Mansur ibn Qara-Tegin, commonly known after his father as Ibn Qaratakin (died 952) was a Turkic military officer of the Samanids in the mid-10th century.

== Biography ==
Mansur is first mentioned in 945, when the rebel Abu 'Ali Chaghani forced Mansur and another Turkic military officer Ibrahim ibn Simjur to leave Nishapur. The two then went to Merv, where the Samanid ruler Nuh I was preparing a counter-attack against Abu 'Ali Chaghani, who had taken control over the Samanid capital of Bukhara and put Ibrahim ibn Ahmad on the throne. Nuh eventually managed to quell the rebellion and in 948 appointed Mansur as the governor of Khorasan. In 949, Mansur wrested Ray from the Buyid ruler Rukn al-Dawla, who was at that time in Shiraz and was ensuring his son's succession.

Mansur then marched towards Isfahan, and had the city plundered. However, Rukn al-Dawla then marched towards Mansur, and a battle shortly ensured, which resulted in the rout of Mansur's army. In 951/2, Mansur re-invaded the territories of Rukn al-Dawla, and several battles ensured between him and Rukn al-Dawla. However, during these clashes, Mansur suddenly died. According to Ibn Miskawayh, "he had been drinking incessantly for some days and nights, and one morning was found dead." Mansur was then succeeded by the pardoned Abu 'Ali Chaghani as the governor of Khorasan.

== Sources ==
- Bosworth, C. E. (2011). The Ornament of Histories: A History of the Eastern Islamic Lands AD 650-1041: The Persian Text of Abu Sa'id 'Abd Al-Hayy Gardizi. I.B.Tauris. pp. 1–169. ISBN 978-1-84885-353-9.
- Bosworth, C. Edmund (1984). "ĀL-E MOḤTĀJ". Encyclopaedia Iranica, Vol. I, Fasc. 7. London et al.: C. Edmund Bosworth. pp. 764–766.
- Frye, R.N. (1975). "The Sāmānids". In Frye, R.N. (ed.). The Cambridge History of Iran, Volume 4: From the Arab Invasion to the Saljuqs. Cambridge: Cambridge University Press. pp. 136–161. ISBN 0-521-20093-8.
- Amedroz, Henry F.; Margoliouth, David S., eds. (1921). The Eclipse of the 'Abbasid Caliphate. Original Chronicles of the Fourth Islamic Century, Vol. V: The concluding portion of The Experiences of Nations by Miskawaihi, Vol. II: Reigns of Muttaqi, Mustakfi, Muti and Ta'i. Oxford: Basil Blackwell.

Preceded by Ibrahim ibn Simjur	Samanid governor of Khorasan; 948 - 951/2	Succeeded by Abu 'Ali Chaghani
