= Battle of Gol-Zarriun =

Battle that dissolved the Hephthalite Empire

- Part of Hephthalite–Persian Wars
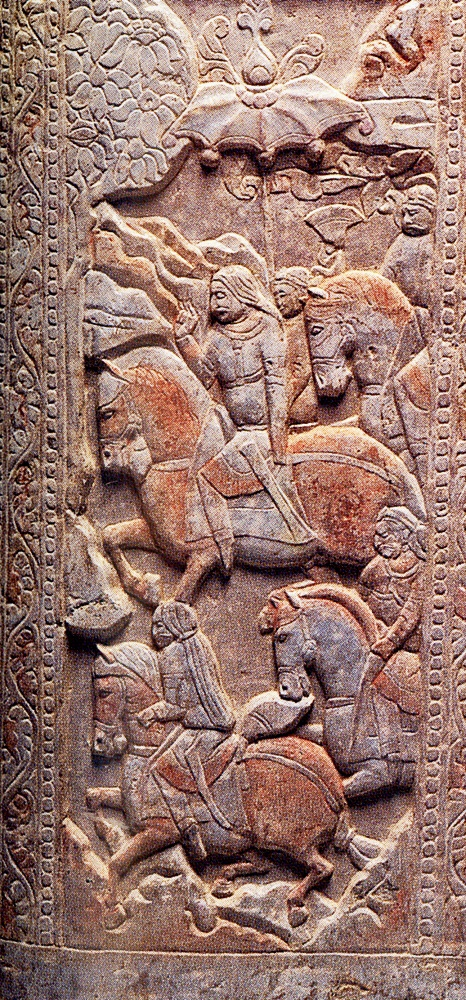
- Turkic horsemen on the Miho funerary couch, c.570 CE.
Date	c. 563
Location	Gol-Zarriun, near Bukhara, Sogdia (present day Uzbekistan) 39.766667°N 64.433333°E
Result	Perso-Turkic victory: The Hephthalite Empire dissolved into minor kingdoms
Territorial changes	Territory north of the Oxus river ceded to the Göktürks and territory south of the Oxus ceded to the Sasanian Empire

Belligerents
Sasanian Empire; First Turkic Khaganate	Hephthalite Empire

Commanders and leaders
Khosrow I Istämi	Ghadfar
- Location within West and Central Asia

The Battle of Gol-Zarriun, also known as Battle of Bukhara, took place around 563 when the Sasanian Empire and the First Turkic Khaganate allied with each other against the Hephthalite Empire.

== Context ==
In 484, Peroz I, the grandfather of Khosrow I Anushirvan (r. 531–579), was killed in the Battle of Herat by the Hephthalites and allowed them to annex much of Khorasan from the Sasanians.

After a peace agreement with the Byzantines in the west, Khosrow I was able to focus his attention on the Eastern Hephthalites and avenge the death of his grandfather. Even with the growth of Sasanian military power under Khosrow's reforms, the Sasanians were still uneasy at the prospect of attacking the Hephthalites on their own and sought allies. Their answer came in the form of the Göktürks' incursion into Central Asia. The movement of Turkic people into Central Asia quickly made them natural enemies and competitors to the Hephthalites. Khosrow I allied himself with Istämi to fight the Hephthalites.

The Hephthalites possessed military power, but they lacked the organization to fight on multiple fronts. According to the account of Firdausi in the Shahnameh, the Hephthalites were supported by troops from Balkh, Shughnan, Amol, Zamm, Khuttal, Termez and Washgird.

In 557/563, (Note: Michael Maas states 557, while Michael J. Decker says 563.) the Sasanians and Göktürks made an alliance and launched a two-pronged attack on the Hephthalites, taking advantage of their disorganization and disunity. As a result, the Göktürks took the territory north of the Oxus River, while the Sasanians annexed the land south of the river.

== Aftermath ==
The Hephthalite Empire was destroyed after the battle, and broke into several minor kingdoms, such as the one ruled by the Hephthalite prince Faghanish in Chaghaniyan. Ghadfar and what was left of his men fled southward to Sasanian territory, where they took refuge. Meanwhile, the Turkic Khagan Istämi reached an agreement with the Hephthalite nobility, and appointed Faghanish as the new Hephthalite king.

This was much to the dislike of Khosrow I, who saw the Turkic collaboration with the Hephthalites as a threat to his rule in the east, and thus marched towards the Sasanian-Turkic border in Gurgan. When he reached the place, he was met by a Turkic delegate from Istämi that presented him gifts. There Khosrow asserted his authority and military potency, and persuaded the Göktürks to make an alliance with him. The alliance contained a treaty that made it obligatory for Faghanish to be sent to the Sasanian court in Ctesiphon and gain the approval of Khosrow for his status as Hephthalite king. Faghanish and his kingdom of Chaghaniyan thus became a vassal of the Sasanian Empire, which set the Oxus as the eastern frontier of the Sasanians and Göktürks. However, friendly relations between the Göktürks and the Sasanians quickly deteriorated after that. Both the Göktürks and the Sasanians wanted to dominate the Silk Road and the trade between the west and the far east. In 568, a Göktürk ambassador was sent to the Byzantine Empire to propose an alliance and a two-pronged attack on the Sassanian Empire, but nothing came of this.

== Sources ==
- Baumer, Christoph (18 April 2018). The History of Central Asia. Bloomsbury Publishing. ISBN 978-1-83860-868-2.
- Bivar, A. D. H. (2003). "Hephthalites". Encyclopaedia Iranica, Vol. XII, Fasc. 2. pp. 198–201.
- Dani, Ahmad Hasan; Litvinsky, B. A. (1996). History of Civilizations of Central Asia: The crossroads of civilizations, A.D. 250 to 750. UNESCO. p. 176. ISBN 978-92-3-103211-0.
- Decker, Michael J. (2022). The Sasanian Empire at War: Persia, Rome, and the Rise of Islam, 224–651. Westholme Publishing.
- Dingas, Beate; Winter, Engelbert (2007). Rome and Persia in Late Antiquity. Cambridge University Press. p. 38.
- Frye, Richard Nelson (1984). The History of Ancient Iran. C.H.Beck. pp. 1–411. ISBN 9783406093975. "The history of ancient iran."
- Howard-Johnston, James. "ḴOSROW II". Encyclopaedia Iranica, Online Edition.
- Inagaki, Hajime (2017). Galleries and Works of the MIHO MUSEUM. Miho Museum. p. 121, panel 8.
- Litvinsky, B. A.; Dani, Ahmad Hasan (1996). History of Civilizations of Central Asia: The crossroads of civilizations, A.D. 250 to 750. UNESCO. pp. 1–569. ISBN 9789231032110.
- Maas, Michael (2015). The Cambridge Companion to the Age of Attila. Cambridge University Press. ISBN 978-1-107-02175-4.
- Petrie, Cameron A. (2020). Resistance at the Edge of Empires: The Archaeology and History of the Bannu Basin from 1000 BC to AD 1200. Oxbow Books. ISBN 9781785703065.
- Rezakhani, Khodadad (2017). ReOrienting the Sasanians: East Iran in Late Antiquity. Edinburgh University Press. pp. 1–256. ISBN 9781474400305.
- Shahbazi, A. Sh. (1988). "Bahrām VI Čōbīn". Encyclopaedia Iranica, Vol. III, Fasc. 5. London et al. pp. 514–522.
- Sims-Williams, Nicholas (2009). "Kadagistān". Encyclopaedia Iranica, Vol. XV, Fasc. 3. pp. 324–325.
