= Abu Bakr Muhammad =

10th-century Muhatajid ruler of Chaghaniyan

Abu Bakr Muhammad (died 941) was the first Muhtajid ruler of Chaghaniyan (until 939) and governor of Samanid Khurasan (933–939). He was the son of Muzaffar ibn Muhtaj.

== Origins ==
The origin of the Muhtajids is unknown. The name has been given by modern historians after their presumed forebear Muhtaj (Arabic: محتاج Muḥtāj). They may have been descended from the Chaghan Khudahs, who ruled Chaghaniyan during the early Middle Ages. Another possibility is that their ancestors were Arabs who migrated to the region and were Iranicized. In any case, by the early 10th century Chaghaniyan had become a vassal to the Samanids of Bukhara.

== Biography ==
Abu Bakr Muhammad was the first ruler fully attested in sources. Under the Samanids, he was the governor of Ferghana. When in 929 the Samanid amir Nasr II was temporarily expelled from power by his brothers, Muhammad remained loyal to him. As a result, when Nasr managed to regained power, he rewarded Muhammad with the governorship of Balkh, and then in 933 made him governor of Khurasan. During his time as governor of Khurasan, Muhammad battled various Dailamite bands in northern Iran. In 939 he fell ill and was replaced in his post by his son Abu 'Ali Chaghani. Abu Bakr Muhammad died in 941.

== Sources ==
- Bosworth, C. E. "Al-e Mohtaj." Encyclopedia Iranica. 22 September 2006. <http://www.iranicaonline.org/articles/al-e-mohtaj-a-local-dynasty>
- Frye, R.N. (1975). "The Sāmānids". In Frye, R.N. (ed.). The Cambridge History of Iran, Volume 4: From the Arab Invasion to the Saljuqs. Cambridge: Cambridge University Press. pp. 136–161. ISBN 0-521-20093-8.

Unknown	Muhtajid ruler of Chaghaniyan; 10th-century–939	Succeeded by Abu 'Ali Chaghani
