= Abd al-Malik I =

Abd al-Malik I may refer to:

- Abu Marwan Abd al-Malik I Saadi, the Sultan of the Saadi Dynasty from 1576 until his death at the Battle of Ksar El Kebir against Portugal in 1578
- Abd al-Malik I (Samanid emir), emir of the Sāmānids (954–961), son of Nuh I
- Abd al-Malik ibn Marwan, 5th Umayyad caliph
