= Abd al-Malik I (Samanid emir) =

Amir of the Samanids from 954 to 961

Abd al-Malik I عبدالملک
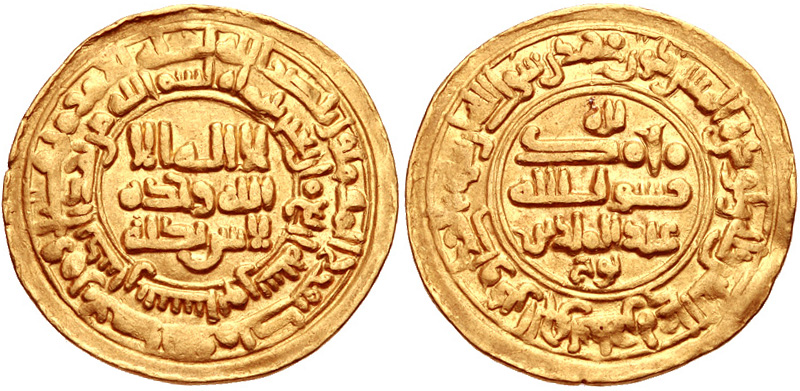
- Gold dinar of Abd al-Malik I, minted at Nishapur in 955/6

Amir of the Samanids
- Reign: August 954 – 23 November 961
- Predecessor: Nuh I
- Successor: Mansur I
- Born: 936 or 944/5
- Died: November 961 (aged 17 or 25); Bukhara
- House: Samanid
- Father: Nuh I
- Religion: Sunni Islam

Abd al-Malik I (Persian: عبدالملک; 936 or 944/5 – November 961) was amir of the Samanid Empire from 954 to 961. He was the son and successor of Nuh I (r. 943–954). His reign was marked by internal strife, with the Turkic slave-soldiers (ghulam) increasing in power. He died after falling from his horse during a game of polo at Bukhara. He was succeeded by his brother Mansur I, who was put on the throne by a faction of ghulams led by the Turkic slave-commander, Fa'iq Khassa.

== Background ==
Abd al-Malik was a member of the Samanid dynasty, a Persian family which ruled mainly in Transoxania and Khurasan. Established in 819, they initially occupied the governorship of Transoxiana under the Abbasid Caliphate, but became independent in 900 under Ismail Samani (r. 829–907). However, they continued to mention the Abbasids in their khutba (Friday sermons) and on their coins. Abd al-Malik was the eldest son of the Samanid amir Nuh I (r. 943–954). According to the contemporary historian Narshakhi, Abd al-Malik ascended the throne at the age of 10, which would mean that he was born in 944/5. However, according to another contemporary historian, Hamza al-Isfahani, Abd al-Malik was born in 936, which would have made him 19 at the time of his accession. The Encyclopaedia Islamica considers the report by Narshakhi unconvincing, and possibly a misinterpretation. It argues that chronicles make no mention of a 10-year-old Abd al-Malik being aided by a regent to supervise the Samanid realm. Nonetheless, it still states that "until further documentation comes to light, nothing more definite can be said on the matter".

== Reign ==
Map of Khurasan and Transoxiana

Since the reign of Nuh I, several difficulties had appeared in the Samanid realm: financial shortcomings, dissatisfaction in the army, and the emergence of powerful neighbouring kingdoms such as the Buyids. Internal strife, lack of capable viziers, and the increasing authority of the Turkic slave-soldiers (ghulam) had also weakened the Samanid realm. The ghulam regiment had been formed by the amirs as a counterbalance to the local Iranian dehqan (gentry), who were opposed to the centralising policy of the dynasty.

From his father Abd al-Malik inherited a tumultuous kingdom; on the news of Nuh's death, many military commanders in different parts of the realm rebelled. Abd al-Malik only succeeded in ascending the throne with the support of the leading military commanders. From the start of his reign, the commanders and courtiers were the ones with actual authority. Abd al-Malik appointed Abu Mansur Muhammad ibn Uzayr as his vizier, while Bakr ibn Malik al-Farghani retained his office as governor of Khurasan.

At the same time, the Muhtajid prince Abu Ali Chaghani, who had lost the governorship of Khurasan at the end of Nuh's reign, fled to the domain of the Buyid ruler Adud al-Dawla (r. 949–983). There he was entrusted with the governorship of Khurasan by the Abbasid caliphs through the mediation of the Buyids, who since their capture of Baghdad in 945 had diminished the political authority of the caliphs, but maintained them as spiritual heads of the Islamic world. Chaghani was also given command of an army by Rukn al-Dawla, which he used to capture the capital of Khurasan, Nishapur. However, he was soon expelled from the province by Bakr ibn Malik al-Farghani, and died of cholera at Ray in 955. After Chaghani's death, Abd al-Malik sent two armies to attack the Buyid cities of Ray and Isfahan.

However, the two powers soon made peace. Under the terms of the peace treaty, the towns in Jibal, including Ray, were to remain under Buyid rule, while the Samanids would receive an annual sum of 200,000 dinars as tribute. At the same time, some dissatisfied authorities within the Samanid realm accused Bakr ibn Malik al-Farghani of conspiring with the Buyids. Abd al-Malik had him summoned to Bukhara in December 956, under the pretence that he would award him a robe of honour, but instead had the ghulam Alptigin kill him. He then had his vizier, Muhammad ibn Uzayr, imprisoned and executed. Both were accused of being followers of the Qarmatians, a branch of Ismaili Shia Islam.

Abu al-Hasan Simjur was subsequently given the governorship of Khurasan, while Abu Ja'far Utbi was made vizier. Abu Ja'far's term as vizier turned out to be short-lived, due to Abd al-Malik's lack of experience, and the influence of the military commanders. He tried to replenish the depleted treasury, but this seemingly caused discontent. In 959, Abd al-Malik had him dismissed and appointed Abu Mansur Yusuf ibn Ishaq in his stead. The following year, Abd al-Malik replaced Abu al-Hasan Simjur with Abu Mansur Muhammad as the governor of Khurasan. Abd al-Malik was possibly attempting to reduce the power of the military commanders.

Regardless, the ghulams were rapidly gaining increasing power. Alptigin gained the governorship of Khurasan for himself, and had Abu Ali Bal'ami, son of Abu'l-Fadl al-Bal'ami, promoted to the role of vizier. The new vizier, however, was not as competent as his father. He was impressionable and incompetent allowing the ghulams to further cement their grip over the realm. According to the 11th-century Iranian historian Gardizi, Alptigin and Bal'ami worked in close cooperation; he adds that "Bal'ami never did anything without the knowledge of Alptigin and on his recommendation."

== Death and aftermath ==
Map of the Samanid emirate at the death of Abd al-Malik I

Abd al-Malik was not able to stop the expansion of the ghulams' powers resulting in the ghulams being effectively in control by the time he died in November 961 at Bukhara, after falling from his horse during a game of polo. His palace in Khurasan was raided soon afterwards by the ghulams, who threw the administration into a state of chaos. Alptigin attempted to appoint Abd al-Malik's son as amir, but another group, led by a Turkic slave-commander named Fa'iq Khassa, managed to put Abd al-Malik's brother Mansur I on the throne.

The Samanid kingdom was in a dire state after Abd al-Malik's death. According to Narshakhi; "When they buried him, the army grew restless and rebelled; everyone coveted the kingdom, and troubles raised their head." Regardless, the modern historian Clifford Edmund Bosworth states that "Mansur's reign may be regarded as the last one in which the fabric of the empire held firm, such that its prosperity excited favourable comment from outsiders." Meanwhile, Alptigin fled to Ghazni on the edge of the Samanid realm, where his slave Sabuktigin eventually established the Ghaznavid dynasty.

Not much is known about the personality of Abd al-Malik. Al-Maqdisi (d. 991) deemed him as an exceptional figure amidst the Samanid monarchs, while Shabankara'i (d. 1358) portrayed him as a fair and virtuous individual. During his reign, Abd al-Malik was known as al-Muwaffaq ("The Divinely Assisted"), and after his death he seemingly became referred to as al-Mu'ayyad ("The Divinely Aided").

== Sources ==
- Bosworth, C.E. (1965). "G̲h̲ulām". In Lewis, B.; Pellat, Ch. & Schacht, J. (eds.). The Encyclopaedia of Islam, Second Edition. Volume II: C–G. Leiden: E. J. Brill. OCLC 495469475.
- Bosworth, C.E. & Crowe, Yolande (1995). "Sāmānids". In Bosworth, C. E.; van Donzel, E.; Heinrichs, W. P. & Lecomte, G. (eds.). The Encyclopaedia of Islam, Second Edition. Volume VIII: Ned–Sam. Leiden: E. J. Brill. ISBN 978-90-04-09834-3.
- Bosworth, C. E. (1982b). "ʿAbd-al-Malek b. Nūḥ b. Naṣr". Encyclopaedia Iranica, Vol. I, Fasc. 2. p. 128.
- Bosworth, C. E. (1998). "Esmāʿīl, b. Aḥmad b. Asad Sāmānī, Abū Ebrāhīm". In Yarshater, Ehsan (ed.). Encyclopædia Iranica. Vol. VIII/6: Eršād al-zerāʿa–Eʿteżād-al-Salṭana. London and New York: Routledge & Kegan Paul. pp. 636–637. ISBN 978-1-56859-055-4.
- Bosworth, C. E. (2002). "Manṣur b. Nūḥ". In Yarshater, Ehsan (ed.). Encyclopædia Iranica. Encyclopaedia Iranica (Online ed.). Encyclopædia Iranica Foundation.
- Frye, R. N. (1975). "The Sāmānids". In Frye, Richard N. (ed.). The Cambridge History of Iran: From the Arab Invasion to the Saljuqs. Vol. 4. Cambridge: Cambridge University Press. pp. 136–161. ISBN 0-521-20093-8.
- Herzig, Edmund; Stewart, Sarah Rosemary Anne (2012). Early Islamic Iran. The Idea of Iran. London New York New York: I.B. Tauris. ISBN 978-1-78076-061-2.
- Kennedy, Hugh (2004) [1986]. The Prophet and the Age of the Caliphates: The Islamic Near East from the 6th to the 11th Century (Second ed.). Harlow: Longman. ISBN 978-0-582-40525-7.
- Treadwell, W. L. (1991). The Political History of the Sāmānid State (PhD thesis). University of Oxford.
- Zarrinkoub, Ruzbeh; Negahban, Farzin (2008). "ʿAbd al-Malik I". In Madelung, Wilferd; Daftary, Farhad (eds.). Encyclopaedia Islamica Online. Brill Online. ISSN 1875-9831.

Preceded by Nuh I	Amir of the Samanids; 954–961	Succeeded by Mansur I
