= Mansur I =

Amir of the Samanids from 961 to 976

Mansur I منصور
- Amir; Shahanshah
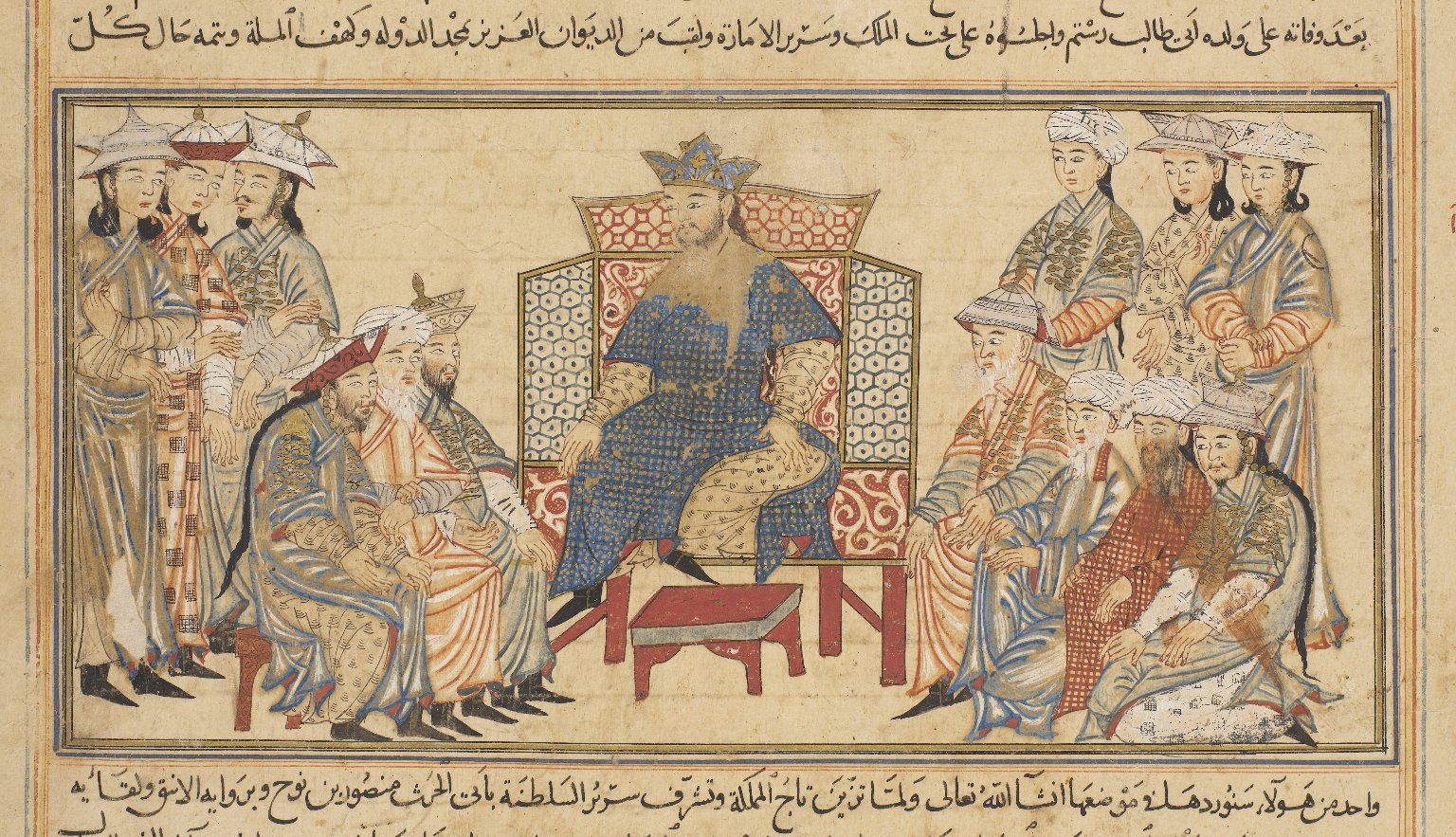
- 14th-century illustration of the coronation of Mansur I

Amir of the Samanids
- Reign: 24 November 961 – 13 June 976
- Predecessor: Abd al-Malik I
- Successor: Nuh II
- Died: 13 June 976
- Issue: Nuh II
- House: Samanid
- Father: Nuh I
- Religion: Sunni Islam

Abu Salih Mansur (Persian: ابو صالح منصور, romanized: Abu Ṣāliḥ Manṣur; died 13 June 976), better known as Mansur I (منصور) was amir of the Samanids from 961 to 976. The son of Nuh I (r. 943–954), his reign was characterized by weak rule and perpetual financial troubles. Mansur was notably the first Samanid ruler to the use title of King of Kings (Shahanshah), most likely as a response to his rival, the Buyid ruler Adud al-Dawla, who likewise used the title. He is also known by the sobriquet Amīr-i Sadid ('The Righteous/Just Emir').

== Rise to power ==
Since the reign of Nuh I (r. 943–954), several difficulties started appearing in the Samanid realm, namely financial shortcomings, dissatisfaction in the army, and the emergence of powerful neighbouring kingdoms such as the Buyids. Internal strife, lack of capable viziers and the increasing authority of the Turkic slave-soldiers (ghilman) had also weakened the Samanid realm. The death of Mansur's brother 'Abd al-Malik I at the end of 961 caused a succession crisis. The ghilman, who were effectively in control of the government, split over who should succeed 'Abd al-Malik. Alptigin, the leader of the ghulams and the governor of Khurasan, supported 'Abd al-Malik's son, while Fa'iq Khassa, who had known Mansur since his childhood, pressed for the latter's coronation. Mansur and Fa'iq were eventually victorious; Alptigin fled to Ghazna, which became a separate domain where the Ghaznavid dynasty was eventually formed. The Samanid kingdom was in a dire state after Abd al-Malik's death, according to Narshakhi; "When they buried him, the army grew restless and rebelled; everyone coveted the kingdom, and troubles raised their head." Regardless, the modern historian Clifford Edmund Bosworth states that "Mansur's reign may be regarded as the last one in which the fabric of the empire held firm, such that its prosperity excited favorable comment from outsiders."

== Reign ==
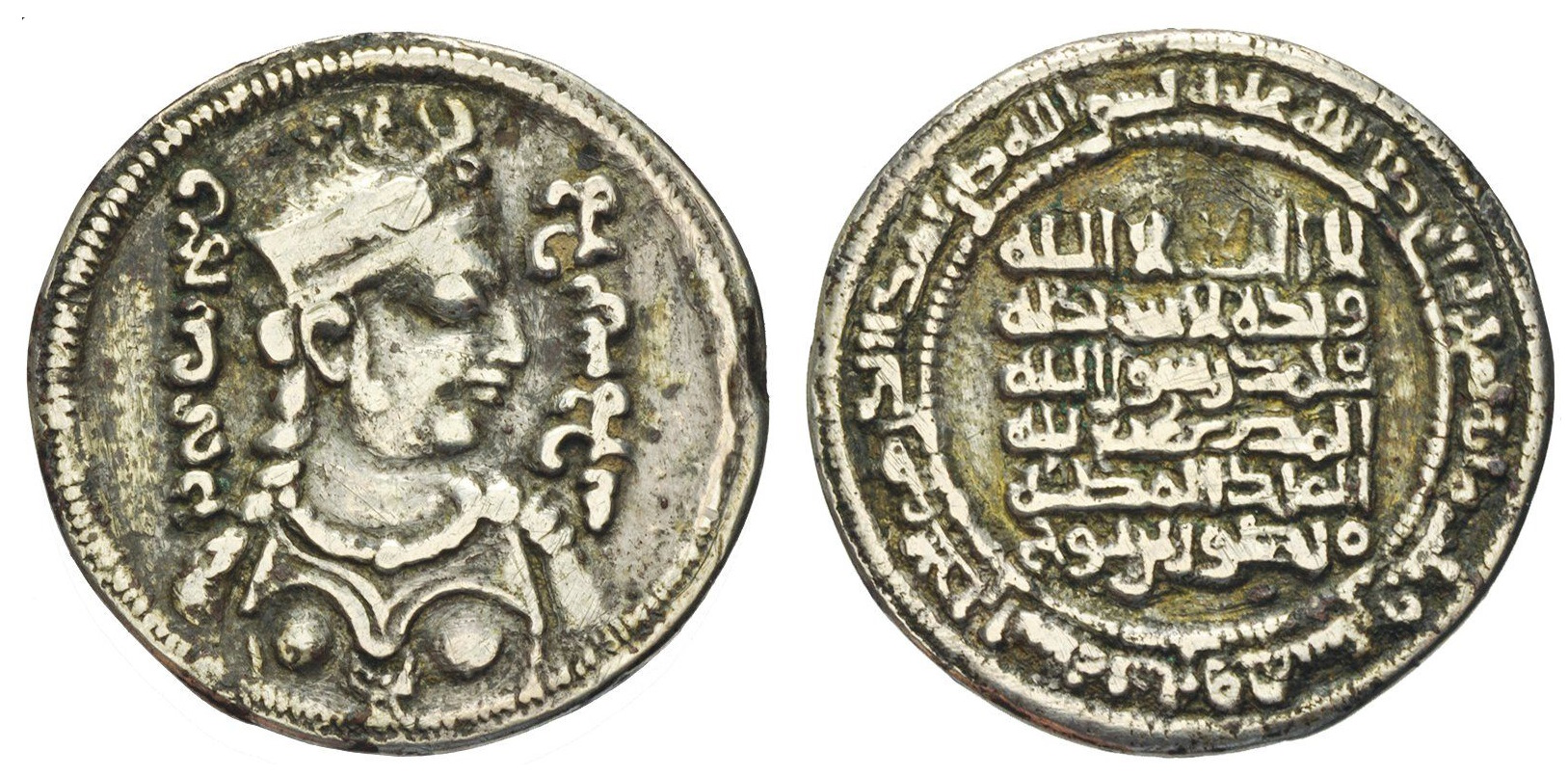
Silver medallion of Mansur I with bilingual Middle Persian and Arabic minted in Bukhara. Obverse in Middle Persian: khvarrah apzut shahanshah "the King of Kings has increased the royal splendor" Reverse in Arabic: la ilaha illa Allah wahdahu la sharik lahu Muhammad rasul Allah al-muti' lillah al-malik al-muzaffar mansur bin nuh "There is no god but Allah, the One, there is no partner to Him, Muhammad is the messenger of Allah, al-Muti' lillah, the victorious king, Mansur son of Nuh."

In order to trace and kill the rebellious Alptigin, Mansur I appointed Abu Mansur Muhammad as the governor of Khorasan, whom he sent against Alptigin. However, Abu Mansur did not manage to kill Alptigin, who fled to Balkh. Abu Mansur, who feared the wrath of his master, shortly changed his allegiance to the Buyid ruler Rukn al-Dawla. Mansur quickly appointed Abu'l-Hasan Muhammad Simjuri as the new governor of Khorasan, and sent him to deal with the rebellious Abu Mansur, which he managed to accomplish.

After having brought stability in Khurasan, Abu'l-Hasan Muhammad Simjuri soon went to war with the Buyids, who had in that year expelled the Samanids' Ziyarid vassals from Tabaristan and Gurgan on the southern shores of the Caspian Sea. The death of Vushmgir, the Ziyarid prince, a few years later caused an end to hostilities, and the Buyid 'Adud al-Dawla paid tribute to the Samanids. This tribute did not last for long, however, and Mansur continued to have difficulties in raising money. The Buyids would continue to move against the Samanid position; 'Adud al-Dawla wrested Kerman from the Banu Ilyas, nominal Samanid vassals, and effectively uprooted Abus, a son of Vushmgir and the Samanid candidate to succeed him, from Tabaristan and Gurgan.

In 969 the Saffarid Abu Ahmad Khalaf arrived at the Samanid court, requesting assistance against his brother Abu'l-Husayn Tahir. Military aid was given, although Tahir's death in 970 proved much more effective than the Samanid assistance. Tahir's son Husayn eventually continued the struggle, and gained the support of the Samanids; the tribute sent by Khalaf subsequently ceased. In 975, Mansur appointed Abu Abdallah Ahmad Jayhani, a grandson of Abu Abdallah Jayhani, as vizier, but he proved unable to stem the Samanid decline. Mansur died on 13 June 976, and was succeeded by his son Nuh II.

== Cultural activity ==
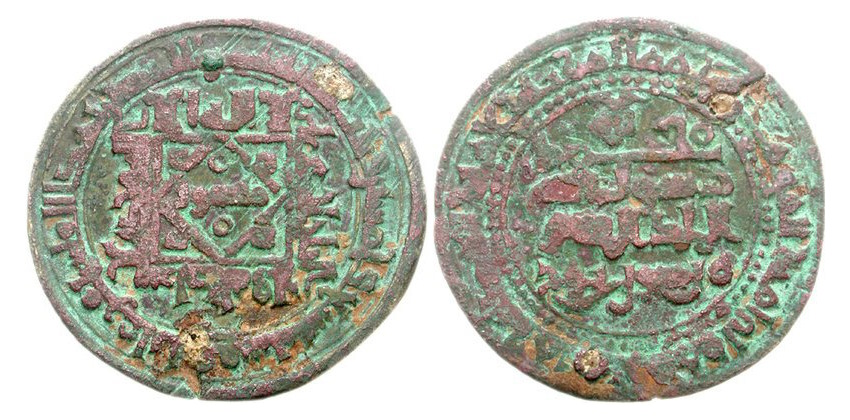
Coinage of Ahmad bin Mansur, as governor in Ferghana. Dated AH 359 (AD 969-70), reign of Mansur I ibn Nuh

Mansur played an important role in the development and use of New Persian as a court and literary language, chiefly through his sponsorship of the translation and continuation of al-Tabari's History of the Prophets and Kings by his vizier, Bal'ami. He also sponsored a Persian translation of al-Tabari's Quranic commentary, Tafsir al-Tabari.

== Sources ==
- Bosworth, C.E. (1965). "G̲h̲ulām". In Lewis, B.; Pellat, Ch. & Schacht, J. (eds.). The Encyclopaedia of Islam, Second Edition. Volume II: C–G. Leiden: E. J. Brill. OCLC 495469475.
- Bosworth, C.E. & Crowe, Yolande (1965). "Sāmānids". In Lewis, B.; Pellat, Ch. & Schacht, J. (eds.). The Encyclopaedia of Islam, Second Edition. Volume II: C–G. Leiden: E. J. Brill. OCLC 495469475.
- Bosworth, C. E. (1982a). "Abbasid Caliphate". Encyclopaedia Iranica, Vol. I, Fasc. 1. pp. 89–95.
- Bosworth, C. E. (1982b). "ʿAbd-al-Malek b. Nūḥ b. Naṣr". Encyclopaedia Iranica, Vol. I, Fasc. 2. p. 128.
- Bosworth, C. E. (1998). "Esmāʿīl, b. Aḥmad b. Asad Sāmānī, Abū Ebrāhīm". Encyclopaedia Iranica, Vol. VIII, Fasc. 6. pp. 636–637.
- Bosworth, C. E. (2002). "Manṣur b. Nūḥ". Encyclopaedia Iranica.
- Frye, R. N. (1975). "The Sāmānids". In Frye, Richard N. (ed.). The Cambridge History of Iran: From the Arab Invasion to the Saljuqs. Vol. 4. Cambridge: Cambridge University Press. pp. 136–161. ISBN 0-521-20093-8.
- Haug, Robert (2022). "Manṣūr I b. Nūḥ". In Fleet, Kate; Krämer, Gudrun; Matringe, Denis; Nawas, John; Rowson, Everett (eds.). Encyclopaedia of Islam (3rd ed.). Brill Online. doi:10.1163/1573-3912_ei3_COM_36177. ISSN 1873-9830.
- Treadwell, W. L. (1991). The Political History of the Sāmānid State (PhD thesis). University of Oxford.
- Khalegi-Motlagh, Dj. (1983). "Abū Manṣūr ʿAbd-al-Razzāq". Encyclopaedia Iranica, Vol. I, Fasc. 3. p. 335.
- Zarrinkoub, Ruzbeh; Negahban, Farzin (2008). "ʿAbd al-Malik I". In Madelung, Wilferd; Daftary, Farhad (eds.). Encyclopaedia Islamica Online. Brill Online. ISSN 1875-9831.
- Madelung, Wilferd; Daftary, Farhad; Meri, Josef W. (2003). Culture and Memory in Medieval Islam: Essays in Honor of Wilferd Madelung. I.B. Tauris. ISBN 978-1-86064-859-5.

Preceded by Abd al-Malik I	Amir of the Samanids; 961–976	Succeeded by Nuh II
