= Ibrahim ibn Simjur =

Turkic military officer (died 948)

Ibrahim ibn Simjur (died 948) was a Samanid military officer from the Simjurid family.

== Biography ==
Ibrahim was the son of Simjur al-Dawati, the founder of the Simjurid family. Ibrahim is first mentioned as a deputy of the Muhtajid ruler Abu 'Ali Chaghani. In 945, the Samanid ruler Nuh I removed the governorship of Khorasan from Abu 'Ali, and instead gave it to Ibrahim. However, Abu 'Ali responded by rebelling; he managed to capture the Samanid capital of Bukhara and place Nuh's uncle Ibrahim ibn Ahmad on the throne.

Abu 'Ali also forced Ibrahim and another Turkic military officer Mansur ibn Qara-Tegin to leave Nishapur. The two then went to Merv, where Nuh was preparing a counter-attack against Abu 'Ali. Nuh eventually managed to quell the rebellion and Ibrahim shortly died in 948 and was succeeded by Mansur ibn Qara-Tegin as the governor of Khorasan. Ibrahim had a son named Abu'l-Hasan Simjuri, who became even more prominent than his father.

== Sources ==
- Bosworth, C. E. (2011). The Ornament of Histories: A History of the Eastern Islamic Lands AD 650-1041: The Persian Text of Abu Sa'id 'Abd Al-Hayy Gardizi. I.B.Tauris. pp. 1–169. ISBN 978-1-84885-353-9.
- Bosworth, C. Edmund (1984). "ĀL-E MOḤTĀJ". Encyclopaedia Iranica, Vol. I, Fasc. 7. London et al.: C. Edmund Bosworth. pp. 764–766.
- Frye, R.N. (1975). "The Sāmānids". In Frye, R.N. (ed.). The Cambridge History of Iran, Volume 4: From the Arab Invasion to the Saljuqs. Cambridge: Cambridge University Press. pp. 136–161. ISBN 0-521-20093-8.
- Treadwell, Luke. "Simjurids." Encyclopaedia Iranica. Ed. Ehsan Yarshater. Columbia University. Retrieved 9 June 2014.

Preceded by Abu 'Ali Chaghani	Samanid governor of Khorasan; 945 - 948	Succeeded by Mansur ibn Qara-Tegin
