= Faghanish =

- Hephthalite king
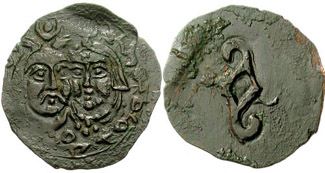
- Anonymous coin of two joined facing heads, minted in Chaghaniyan between 550-650. The inscription is written in Sogdian.
- Reign: 560 - ???
- Predecessor: Ghadfar
- Successor: Unknown

Faghanish was a Hephthalite prince, who was the ruler of Chaghaniyan in the mid-6th century. Originally a subordinate of the Hephthalite king, he became a vassal of the Sasanian Empire in c. 560 after the Hephthalite Empire was broken into several minor kingdoms when they suffered a crushing defeat to a combined Sasanian-Turkic army at Gol-Zarriun.

== Biography ==
Faghanish was a descendant of the powerful Hephthalite king Khushnavaz, who had defeated and killed the Sasanian king (shah) Peroz I in 484. Faghanish served a local ruler of Chaghaniyan under the suzerainty of the senior Hephthalite king. In c. 560, a combined Sasanian and Turkic force defeated the Hephthalite king Ghadfar and his men at a place called Gol-Zarriun, near Bukhara in Sogdia. The Hephthalite Empire was destroyed as a result, and broke into several minor kingdoms, such as the one ruled by Faghanish in Chaghaniyan. Ghadfar and what was left of his men fled southward to Sasanian territory, where they took refuge. Meanwhile, the Turkic Yabgu Istemi reached an agreement with the Hephthalite nobility, and appointed Faghanish as the new Hephthalite king.

This was much to the dislike of the Sasanian shah Khosrow I Anushirvan (r. 531–579), who considered the Turkic collaboration with the Hephthalites to pose a danger for his rule in the east, and thus marched towards the Sasanian-Turkic border in Gurgan. When he reached the place, he was met by a Turkic delegate of Istemi that presented him gifts. There Khosrow asserted his authority and military potency, and persuaded the Turks to make an alliance with him. The alliance contained a treaty that made it obligatory for Faghanish to be sent to the Sasanian court in Ctesiphon and gain the approval of Khosrow for his status as Hephthalite king. Faghanish and his kingdom of Chaghaniyan thus became a vassal of the Sasanian Empire, which set the Oxus as the eastern frontier the Sasanians and Turks. Faghanish's fate after that is unknown, he may have been the ancestor of the principality of Chaghaniyan that ruled from the early 7th century to the late 8th century.

== Sources ==
- Rezakhani, Khodadad (2017). ReOrienting the Sasanians: East Iran in Late Antiquity. Edinburgh University Press. pp. 1–256. ISBN 9781474400305.
- Litvinsky, B. A.; Dani, Ahmad Hasan (1996). History of Civilizations of Central Asia: The crossroads of civilizations, A.D. 250 to 750. UNESCO. ISBN 9789231032110.
- Bivar, A. D. H. (2003). "Hephthalites". In Yarshater, Ehsan (ed.). Encyclopædia Iranica. Vol. XII/2: Hedāyat al-mota'allemin–Herat VII. London and New York: Routledge & Kegan Paul. pp. 198–201. ISBN 978-0-933273-75-7.
