= Nuh I =

Amir of the Samanids from 943 to 954

- Amir of the Samanids; Shahanshah
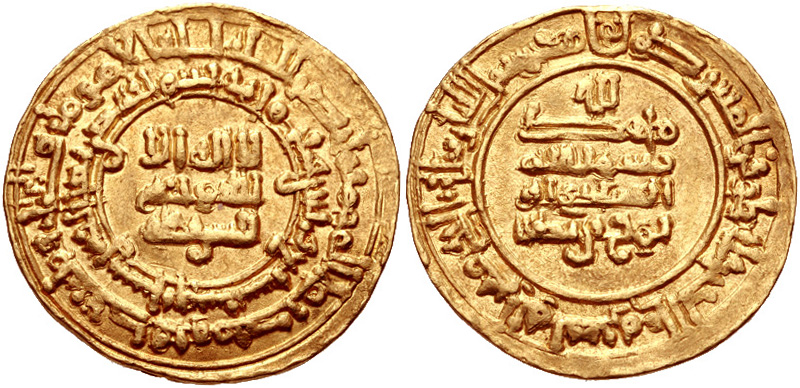
- Coin of Nuh I
- Reign: 14 April 943 – August 954
- Predecessor: Nasr II
- Successor: Abd al-Malik I
- Born: 926
- Died: August 954 (aged 28)
- Issue: Abd al-Malik I Mansur I Abd al-Aziz
- House: Samanid
- Father: Nasr II
- Religion: Sunni Islam

Nuh ibn Nasr, or Nuh I (926-954), was the Amir of the Samanids in 943–954. He was the son of Nasr II. It is rumoured that he married a Chinese princess.

== Rise to power ==
Nuh came to power after preventing a revolt against his father in 943. Several army officers, unhappy over Nasr's support of Ismaili missionaries, planned to assassinate him. Nuh, given notice of the plot, arrived at a banquet held to organize the assassination, and seized and killed the leader of the plotters. To placate the others, he promised to put an end to the activities of the Ismailis, and convinced his father to abdicate in his favor.

== Reign ==
Shortly after Nuh's ascension, he was forced to put down a revolt in Khwarazm. Another revolt, launched by Abu 'Ali Chaghani, proved to be much more serious, and was supported by several Samanid officers such as Abu Mansur Muhammad, who served as the governor of Tus. Abu 'Ali, in addition to being the ruler of the Samanid vassal state of Chaghaniyan, had been the governor of Khurasan since 939. In 945 he was removed from the latter post by Nuh, who desired to replace him with a Turk named Ibrahim ibn Simjur. Abu 'Ali joined forces with Nuh's uncle Ibrahim ibn Ahmad and rebelled.

In 947 Ibrahim gained control of Bukhara and crowned himself as ruler of the Samanid Empire, forcing Nuh to flee to Samarkand. Ibrahim, however, proved to be unpopular in the city, enabling Nuh to capture and blind his uncle as well as two of his brothers. Abu 'Ali's capital in Chaghaniyan was sacked, but in 948 peace was made between the two, and Abu 'Ali was confirmed as ruler of Chaghaniyan. Following the death of the governor of Khurasan, Mansur ibn Qara-Tegin, in 952, Abu 'Ali regained that post as well.

Nuh removed Abu 'Ali from the governorship of Khurasan a second time after receiving a complaint from Vushmgir, the Ziyarid ruler of Tabaristan. Nuh had previously supported Vushmgir; the latter had gained possession of Gurgan for a short time with Samanid support, and after losing it to the Buyids, he used a Samanid army to take back Gurgan and Tabaristan in 947. The Ziyarids, along with the Samanids, and the Buyids subsequently fought over the region for the next few years, each side gaining temporary control of the area several times. Vushmgir, who was an ally of the Samanids, had been pleased when Abu 'Ali had gone to war against the Buyids, but was angered when Abu 'Ali made peace with the Buyids of Ray. His complaint, which consisted of accusations that Abu 'Ali was conspiring with the Buyids, resulted in Nuh's decision to remove him. Abu 'Ali then fled to the Buyids, and received a grant from the Abbasid Caliph Al-Muti for control of Khurasan. Nuh's death in 954 prevented him from solving this problem. He was succeeded by his son 'Abd al-Malik I.

== Notes ==
Preceded by Nasr II	Amir of the Samanids; 943–954	Succeeded by Abd al-Malik I
