= Ibrahim ibn Ahmad =

10th-century Samanid ruler

Ibrahim ibn Ahmad (died 10th-century), was the amir of the Samanids briefly in 947. He was the son of Ahmad Samani.

Ibrahim had a brother named Nasr II, who succeeded Ahmad as the ruler of the Samanids in 914. In 943, Nasr's son Nuh I succeeded him. During this period Ibrahim resided in the Hamdanid court in Iraq. In 945, Nuh I dismissed the Muhtajid Abu 'Ali Chaghani from the governorship of Khurasan after hearing complaints of the latter's harsh rule, and sought to replace him with a Turk, the Simjurid Ibrahim ibn Simjur. Abu 'Ali refused to accept his dismissal and rebelled. He then convinced Ibrahim to come from Iraq, which he agreed to do; Ibrahim first travelled to Tikrit, and then to Hamadan, and then reached the Samanid capital of Bukhara, which he captured with the aid of Abu 'Ali in 947, and crowned himself as the ruler of the Samanids.

The rebellion of Ibrahim and Abu 'Ali quickly spread around the Samanid state, even as far as Ray in Jibal. Ibrahim's rule was shortly recognized by the Abbasid caliph. However, he was unpopular with the people of Bukhara, and Nuh soon responded by retaking the city and blinding Ibrahim and two brothers. The fate of Ibrahim is not known.

Preceded by Nuh I	Amir of the Samanids; 947	Succeeded by Nuh I
