= Ghilman =

Slave-soldiers in the Islamic world

- Active: 9th century - early 19th century
- Country: Abbasid Caliphate; Buyids; Tahirids; Saffarids; Ghaznavid Empire; Seljuk Empire; Ghurids; Khwarazmian dynasty Qara Qoyunlu; Aq Qoyunlu; Delhi Sultanate
- Type: Slave-soldier; Mercenaries

Ghilman (singular Arabic: غُلاَم ghulām, (Note: Other standardized transliterations: ġulām / ḡulām. IPA: [æʊˈlæːm, ɣoˈlæːm].) plural غِلْمَان ghilmān) (Note: Other standardized transliterations: ġilmān / ḡilmān. IPA: [ɣelˈmæːn].) were slave-soldiers and/or mercenaries in armies throughout the Islamic world. Islamic states from the early 9th century to the early 19th century consistently deployed slaves as soldiers, a phenomenon that was very rare outside of the Islamic world.

== Etymology ==
The words ghilman (غِلْمَان) and its singular variant ghulam (غلام) are of Arabic origin, meaning boys or servants. It derives from the Arabic root ḡ-l-m (غ ل م).

== History ==
The ghilman were slave-soldiers taken as prisoners of war from conquered or colonized regions or frontier zones abducted from raids designated upon European populations, especially from among the Turkic people of Central Asia and the Caucasian peoples (Turkish: Kölemen). They fought in bands, and demanded high pay for their services.

The idea of slave soldiers is sometimes projected back to the earliest Islamic period, but there is no evidence that the Prophet Muhammad or the Rashidun Caliphs organized slave armies. While individuals of slave origin, such as freedmen or war captives, may have joined battles voluntarily, the systematic use of slave soldiers did not exist at that time. Under the Umayyads, some Slavs and Berbers were employed in military roles, but it was only by the mid-9th century, particularly under the Abbasids, that the large-scale recruitment of slave soldiers, such as the ghilman, became a defining feature of Islamic military systems. The first Muslim ruler to form an army of slave soldiers, before the Abbasid Caliphs, seems to have been Ibrahim I ibn al-Aghlab (800–812), founder of the Aghlabids of Ifriqiya, where there was already a large population of agricultural slaves and access to extensive slave trading networks across the Sahara Desert.

Ghilman were introduced to the Abbasid Caliphate during the reign of al-Mu'tasim (r. 833–842), who showed them great favor and relied upon them for his personal guard. Accounts cite that their numbers increased in the caliphal household as Mu'tasim tried to address the court factionalism. These slave-soldiers were opposed by the native Arab population, and riots against them in Baghdad in 836 forced Mu'tasim to relocate his capital to Samarra.

The use of ghilman reached its maturity under al-Mu'tadid and their training was conceived and inspired through the noble furusiyya. From a slave, a ghulam attained his freedom after completing the formative training period and joined the elite corps as a mounted warrior. The ghilman rose rapidly in power and influence, and under the weak rulers that followed Mu'tasim, they became kingmakers: they revolted several times during the so-called "Anarchy at Samarra" in the 860s and killed four caliphs. Eventually, starting with Ahmad ibn Tulun in Egypt, some of them became autonomous rulers and established dynasties of their own, leading to the dissolution of the Abbasid Caliphate by the mid-10th century.

In Umayyad Spain, slave soldiers of "saqaliba" (Slavs) were used from the time of Al-Hakam I, but only became a large professional force in the tenth century, when the slave soldier recruitment shifted to Christian Spain, particularly the Kingdom of León.

A ghulam was trained and educated at his master's expense and could earn his freedom through his dedicated service. Ghilman were required to marry Turkic slave-women, who were chosen for them by their masters. Some ghilman seem to have lived celibate lives. The absence of family life and offspring was possibly one of the reasons that ghilman, even when they attained power, generally failed to start dynasties or to proclaim their independence. There are, however, a few exceptions to that rule, such the Ghaznavid dynasty of Afghanistan and the Anushtegin dynasty, which succeeded it.

Slave soldiers became the core of Islamic armies as the Bedouin, Ghazi holy warriors and conscripts were not as reliable, while Ghilman were expected to be loyal as they had no personal connections to the rest of society. However, the Ghilman often did not remain as loyal as expected.

From the 10th century, masters would distribute tax farming land grants (Iqta) to the ghilman to support their slave armies.

The Buyids and likely the Tahirids also built armies of Turkish slave soldiers. The Saffarids drew slave soldiers from Turks, Indians and Africans. The Ghaznavid dynasty, which originated from a slave soldier of the Samanids, also built their military around slave soldiers, first Turks and later Indians.

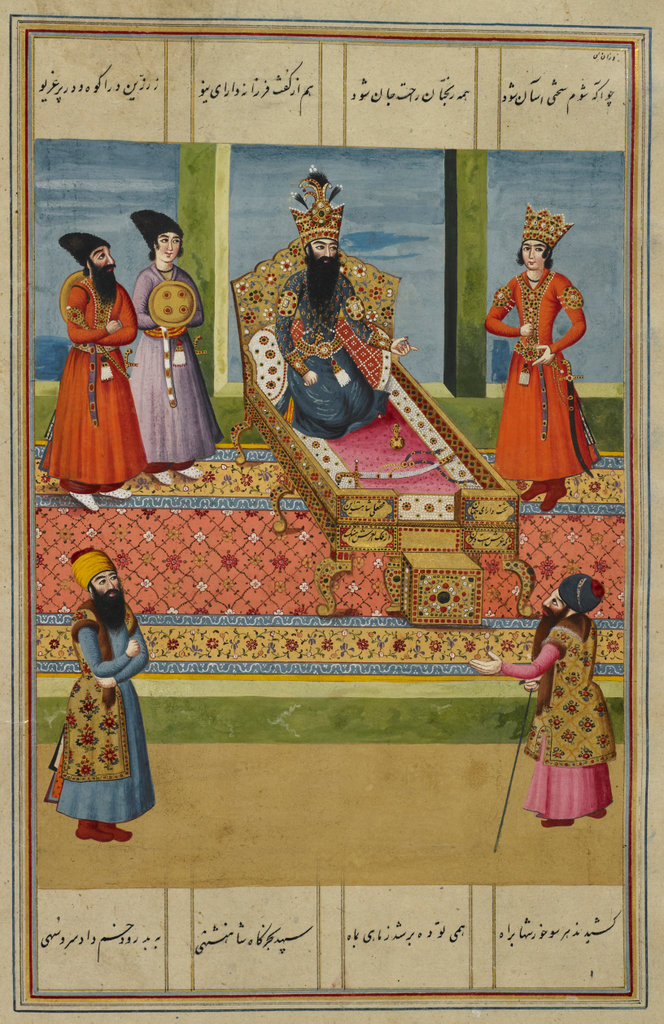
Fath-Ali Shah Qajar seated on the Sun Throne flanked by a prince, probably Abbas Mirza, and two gholams with his shield and mace, giving audience to two ministers. Folio from the Shahanshahnameh of Fath-Ali Khan Saba, dated 1810

The Turkish Seljuks and their successors the Ghurids and the Turkic Khwarazmian dynasty also continued with an army of mainly Turkish slave soldiers. Seljuk regional princes were each placed under the tutelage of slave soldier guardians (atābak) who formed their own dynasties. After a brief interruption under the Mongols, the institution returned under the Qara Qoyunlu and Aq Qoyunlu Turkmens. The various Iranian dynasties (Safavid, Afsharid, Qajar) drew slave soldiers from the Caucasus such as Georgians, Circassians and Armenians. (Unlike the Seljuks, who quickly abandoned their tribal warriors for an increase in slave-soldier forces, the Mongols did not adopt the institution of slave-soldiers).

The Delhi Sultanate also made extensive use of Turkish cavalry ghilman as their core shock troops. After Central Asia fell to the Mongols they switched to capturing Hindu boys to convert into Islamic slave soldiers.

There were violent ethnic conflicts between the different groups of ghilman, the Turks, Slavs, Nubians and Berbers in particular.

== Tactics and equipment ==
Islamic caliphs often recruited slave-soldiers from the Turkic peoples of Central Asia due to their hardiness in desert conditions and expertise with horseback riding. Ghilman in the Abbasid Caliphate fought primarily as a mounted strike force whose purpose was to weaken the enemy with swift and rapid attacks before allied infantry were sent into battle. They carried a lance that could be used to impale enemy infantry easily and a round wooden shield that had been reinforced with either animal skin or thin metal plates. These ghilman also carried a sword on their belt, where it was easier to draw as opposed to the back or the chest.

== Quranic reference ==
The Quran mentions ghilman in verse 52:24: "There will circulate among them ghilman for them, as if they were pearls well-protected." Ghilman are traditionally described as servant boys provided especially for believers in heaven. In verse 56:17: "There will circulate among them [the faithful in heaven] young boys made eternal" — "them" refer to the faithful in heaven and "young boys made eternal" to ghilman. Descriptions of the ghilman by tenth and sixteenth-century theologians were focused on their beauty. Their commentaries also hold that the extratemporal parameters of the Paradise, which the young servants inhabit, are also extended to them so that they do not age or die. Some in Shia tradition suggested that homosexuality might apply in heaven. Though this is directly contradicted by the Qur'anic account of Lot, where homosexuality is not tied to procreation, but is considered the antithesis to Tahara or purity in of itself (Quran 11:78). Furthermore some argued against any sexuality in heaven on account of Adam and Eve having been un-clothed in heaven until having eaten from the forbidden tree (Quran 7:27).

== See also ==
- Mamluk
- Janissaries
- Qizilbash
- Varangian
- Simjurids
- Black Guard (Morocco)
- Saqaliba
