= Simjurids =

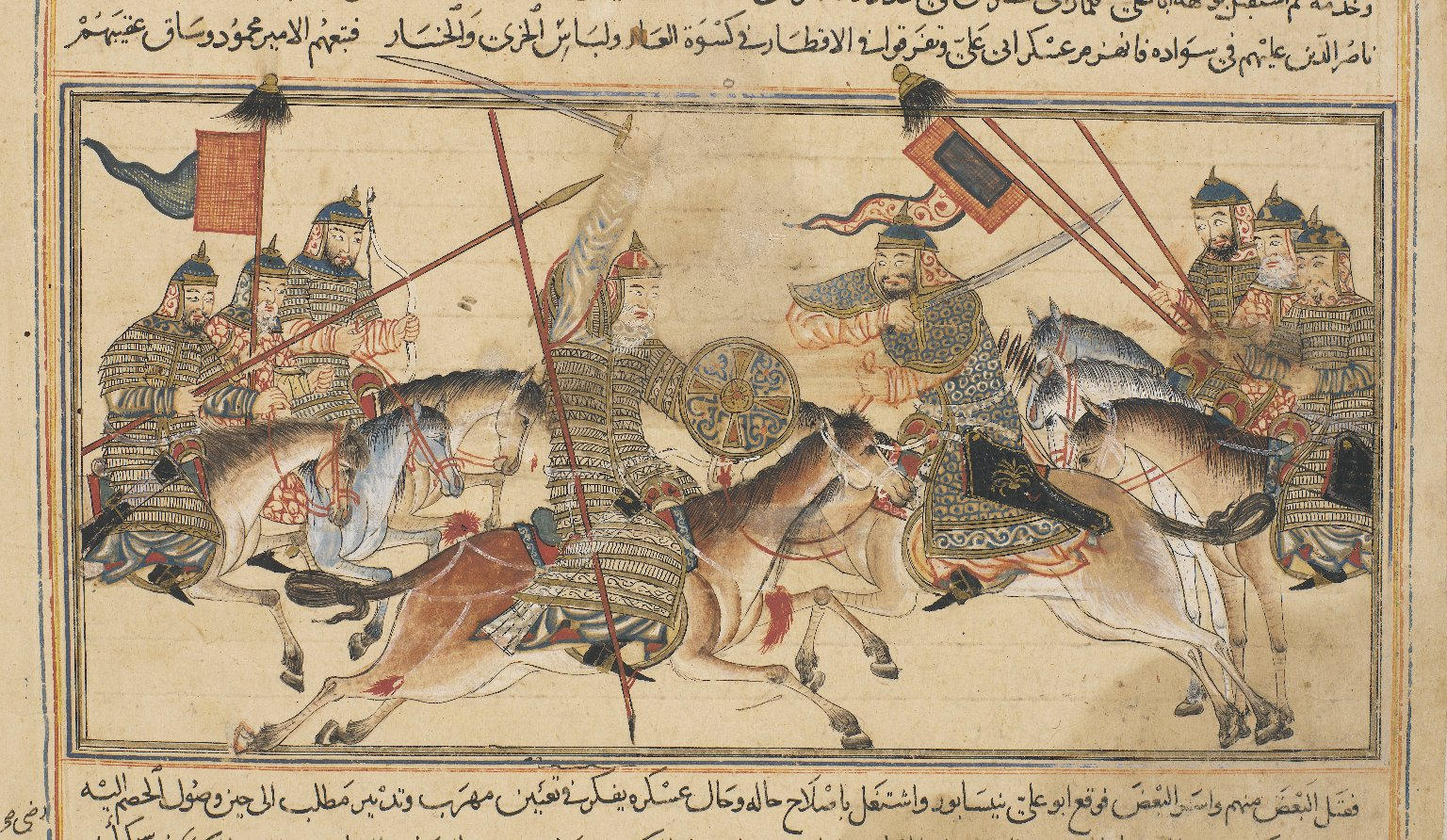
Fight between Mahmud of Ghazni and Abu 'Ali Simjuri.

The Simjurids were a Turkic family that served the Samanid emirs of Bukhara in the 10th century. They played an influential role in the history of eastern Iran and southern Afghanistan during that time, and by the second half of the 10th century they had built a semi-independent principality in Khurasan.

== History ==
The Simjurids originated as Turkic slaves (mameluks or ghilman) for the Samanid amirs. They quickly rose to prominence thanks to their skills as military commanders and governors, along with their extensive estates in the Quhistan region which acted as a permanent power base.

Their founder and eponym, Simjur al-Dawati, was appointed to various governorships in eastern and central Iran, and helped the Samanids to expand their authority in that region. His son Ibrahim ibn Simjur was appointed as governor of Khurasan in 944/945, but only held it for a short time. After Ibrahim's death, his son Abu'l-Hasan Simjuri was invested with the governorship of Khurasan and served in that position for almost three decades.

With the ascension of the child Nuh ibn Mansur to the Samanid amirate, Muhammad was able to gain greater autonomy from Bukhara for himself. He was a key figure in the struggles that wracked the Samanid state in the 970s and 980s. When he died, his son Abu Ali Simjuri took his father's place. Abu 'Ali completely renounced the sovereignty of the Samanids and was able to resist his enemies for some time, but was ultimately captured and executed by the Ghaznavids, another Turkic slave family, who then took over Khurasan.

== List of Simjurids ==
- Simjur al-Dawati, (913-914)
- Ibrahim ibn Simjur, governorship (945-946)
- Abul Hasan Muhammad I Nasir ad-Dawla (son of Ibrahim), 1st governorship (956-960), 2nd governorship (961-982)
- Abu Ali Muhammad II Imad al-Dawla (son of Nasir ad-Dawla), I 1st governorship (984-987), 2nd governorship (995-997)
- Abul Qasim Ali Simjuri (son of Nasir ad-Dawla), reign 997-1002

== See also ==
- Turkic peoples
- Timeline of Turks (500-1300)
- Samanids
- Ghaznavids
