= Muhtajids =

Rulers of Chaghaniyan (c. 10th–11th century)

The Al-i Muhtaj (Persian: آل محتاج) or Muhtajids (also known as the Chaghanids) was an Iranian or Iranized Arab ruling family of the small principality of Chaghaniyan. They ruled during the 10th and early 11th centuries.

== Early history ==
The origin of the Muhtajids is unknown; the name has been given by modern historians after their presumed forebear Muhtaj. They may have been descended from the Chaghān Khudās who ruled Chaghaniyan during the early Middle Ages; another possibility is that their ancestors were Arabs who migrated to the region and were Iranized. In any case, by the early 10th century Chaghaniyan had become a vassal to the Samanids of Bukhara.

== Abu Bakr Muhammad ==
The first ruler fully attested to by the sources was Abu Bakr Muhammad b. Muzaffar b. Muhtaj. Under the Samanids he was the governor of Ferghana. When in 929 the Samanid amir Nasr II was temporarily expelled from power by his brothers, Muhammad remained loyal to him. As a result, when Nasr managed to restore himself he rewarded Muhammad with the governorship of Balkh, and then in 933 made him governor of Khurasan. During his time as governor of Khurasan, Muhammad battled various Dailamite bands in northern Iran. In 939 he fell ill and was removed from his post; he died in 941.

== Abu 'Ali Chaghani ==
Abu 'Ali Ahmad Chaghani was the most prominent of the Muhtajid rulers. He succeeded his father in his posts in 939 and earnestly fought to maintain a Samanid presence in northern Iran, attempting to stem there the rise of the Buyids, Dailamite officers who had already taken over southwest Iran. He fell out of favor with the Samanid amir Nuh b. Nasr and was removed from the governorship of Khurasan. Refusing to accept this, he revolted and installed in Bukhara another Samanid, but eventually Nuh retook Bukhara. Despite this, he was unable to defeat Abu 'Ali, and in the end he allowed him to retain his rule of Chaghaniyan. In 952 Abu 'Ali was made governor of Khurasan a second time, but only a year later was again dismissed. He fled to the Buyids and died in 955.

== Later history ==
The Muhtajid rulers succeeding Abu 'Ali are not well recorded. Abu'l Muzaffar (b.?) Muhammad was the ruler of Chaghaniyan toward the end of the 10th century. He was an ally of the Turkish general Fa'iq and together they fought against Abu'l Muzaffar's relative, Abu'l-Hasan Taher b. Fazl b. Muhammad, who had either been the previous ruler of Chaghaniyan or had usurped power there. Taher's army marched to Balkh in 991 but in the ensuing battle he was killed and Abu'l Muzaffar Muhammad established himself in Chaghaniyan. The alliance with Fa'iq meant that he was also an enemy of the Simjuris; he therefore took part in the conflicts that marked the end of the Samanids as a power (see Nuh II of Samanid for details).

By the end of the century the Muhtajid rulers became vassals of the Ghaznavids, who had supplanted the Samanids in Afghanistan and Khurasan. In 1025 an unnamed Chaghani ruler and other Ghaznavid vassals joined Sultan Mahmud of Ghazna when he crossed the Oxus River to meet his ally, the Karakhanid ruler of Kashgar Qadir-khan Yusuf. During the reign of Mahmud's successor Mas'ud, the governor of Chaghaniyan was described as a son-in-law of Mas'ud's named Abu'l-Qasem, who may have been a Muhtajid. Abu'l-Qasem temporarily had to flee from the province in the face of an invasion by the Transoxianan Karakhanids. No more rulers of Chaghaniyan are mentioned after this, and only a few years later the Seljuks took control of the region.

== See also ==
- List of Sunni Muslim dynasties

== Sources ==
- Bosworth, C. Edmund (1984). "Āl-e Moḥtāj". In Yarshater, Ehsan (ed.). Encyclopædia Iranica. Vol. I/7: Ahriman–Alafrank. London and New York: Routledge & Kegan Paul. pp. 764–766. ISBN 978-0-71009-096-6.
- Frye, R.N. (1975). "The Sāmānids". In Frye, R.N. (ed.). The Cambridge History of Iran, Volume 4: From the Arab Invasion to the Saljuqs. Cambridge: Cambridge University Press. pp. 136–161. ISBN 0-521-20093-8.
