= Madaniyah, Iraq =

Village in Iraq

Coordinates: 30°48′N 47°36′E

Al-Basrah in Iraq.

Madaniyah, Iraq is a small village of Basrah Governorate, on the west bank of the Shatt Al-Arab River in southern Iraq. It is adjacent to the town of Ad Dayr and is located at 30.802088, 47.574837.

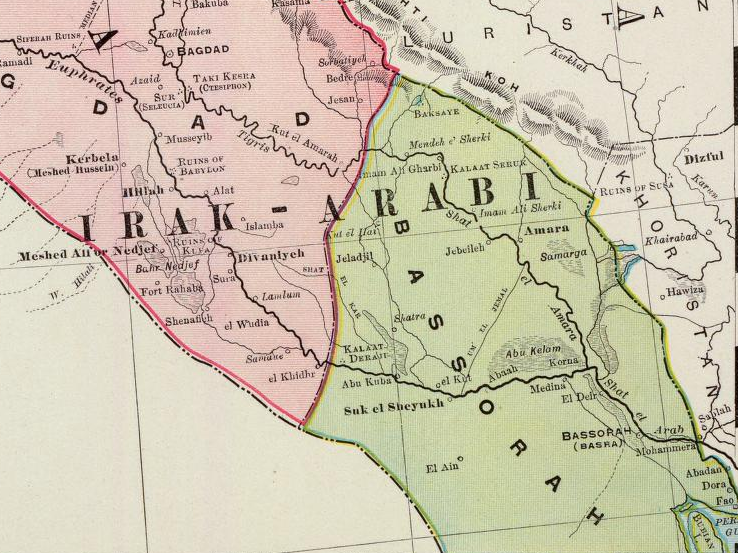
Basra Province 1897.

Ad Dayr (الدير ) The town has one of the few bridges over the Shatt Al-Arab. Iraq.

The area is also close to the Mesopotamian Marshes(Hammar Marshes), and has traditionally been home to many Marsh Arabs. The town has two mosques and girls school.

The area suffered greatly during the Iran–Iraq War, during which it was a major battlefield, and again after the 1991 Iraqi uprising.
