= Abu Muhammad al-Hasan al-Muhallabi =

Mid–10th century Arab vizier and statesman

Abu Muhammad al-Hasan al-Muhallabi أبو محمد الحسن المهلبي

Vizier of Mu'izz al-Dawla
- In office 950/951 – 963

Personal details
- Born: c. 903
- Died: c. 963
- Spouse: unknown
- Children: Muhammad (son)
- Parent: Muhammad ibn Harun al-Muhallabi
- Military career
- Rank: Head of Military

Abu Muhammad al-Hasan al-Muhallabi (died 963) was an Arab statesman who served as the vizier of the Buyid amir Mu'izz al-Dawla. He was from the prominent Muhallabi family.

He was born in 903, and was the son of Muhammad ibn Harun from the Muhallabi family. Al-Muhallabi later served as the administrator of Ahvaz, and soon began serving the Buyids who were the new masters of Iraq and western Iran. Al-Muhallabi quickly rose to be a prominent figure at the Buyid court, and later became the companion of Abu Ja'far Saymari, the chief secretary of Mu'izz al-Dawla, who was the Buyid ruler of Iraq. In 950/951, Mu'izz al-Dawla appointed Muhallabi as his vizier and gave him the title of ostadh.

In 950/951, after constant conflicts with the Batihah ruler 'Imran ibn Shahin, Mu'izz al-Dawla sent an army against 'Imran ibn Shahin under the joint command of al-Muhallabi and the Daylamite general Ruzbahan.

Ruzbahan, who disliked al-Muhallabi, convinced him to directly attack 'Imran. He kept his forces in the rear and fled as soon as fighting between the two sides began. 'Imran used the terrain effectively, laying ambushes and confusing al-Muhallabi's army. Many of al-Muhallabi's soldiers died in the fighting and he only narrowly escaped capture, swimming to safety. Mu'izz al-Daula then came to terms with 'Imran, acceding to his terms. Prisoners were exchanged and 'Imran was made a vassal of the Buyids, being appointed as governor of the Batihah.

Al-Muhallabi died in 963 after becoming ill during a campaign in Oman. According to Ibn Miskawayh, al-Muhallabi had been poisoned by Mu'izz al-Dawla.

== Sources ==
- Donohue, John J. (2003). The Buwayhid Dynasty in Iraq 334h., 945 to 403h., 1012: Shaping Institutions for the Future. ISBN 9789004128606.
- Kabir, Mafizullah (1964). The Buwayhid Dynasty of Baghdad, 334/946-447/1055.
- Pomerantz, Maurice (2011). "MOHALLABI, Abu Moḥammad". Encyclopaedia Iranica.
