= Ezzedine Salim subdistrict =

Ezzedine Salim subdistrict ناحية عز الدين سليم Huwair
- Location within Iraq
- Coordinates: 30.982925°N 47.317772°E
- Country: Iraq
- Governorate: Basra
- district: Al-Midaina District

Area
  - Total: 52 sq mi (135 km^{2})

Population (2012)
  - Total: 110.000

Ezzedine Salim (Arabic: ناحية عز الدين سليم) is an Iraqi subdistrict located in Basra Governorate with a total area of roughly 135 km^{2}. It was named after Ezzedine Salim, President of the Governing Council of Iraq, who was born in the subdistrict. Its capital is the town of Huwair. Ezzedine Salim is rich with water sources, being bordered by the Euphrates in the south side and marshes in the north east and north west. The total population is 67,500 inhabitants, the majority of them Shi'a Arabs. Many of them work in agriculture, with the main crops being wheat, barley, and tomatoes. In addition to agriculture they also practice traditional activities associated with marshes such as fishing, buffalo breeding and harvesting of reeds.

During the era of Saddam Hussein, Ezzedine Salim subdistrict was oppressed severely wherein 183 men were executed for political reasons, in addition to the disastrous economic, sociological, and ecological brought on by the draining of the surrounding marshes.

== Huwair town ==
Huwair is the seat of the Ezzedine Salim subdistrict and has a total population of 67,500. It is situated on the bank of Euphrates, 85 km north of Basra. Huwair is an industrial town containing more than 2,000 workshop and timber-yard produces doors and furniture. Huwair is also a major center for boat-building, particularly of the mashoof and tarada canoes used widely by the Marsh Arabs.

== West Qurana oil fields phase 2 ==
West Qurana oil fields phase 2 is a large oilfield in the subdistrict that holds an estimated 13 billion barrels of raw oil. It was first explored by Soviet firms in 1973, but development had been postponed to 2009, and real production only began in late 2013 with 120,000 barrels per day. The oilfield is exploited by a consortium led by Russian company Lukoil, with a 56.25% stake, Iraqi state-owned South Oil Company with a 25% stake, and Statoil with an 18.75% stake.

== People from Ezzedine Salim subdistrict ==
- Ezzedine Salim
