= Dhi Qar Governorate =

Governorate of Iraq

Dhi Qar محافظة ذي قار Dhi Qar Province
- Governorate
- Seal

- Coordinates: 31°14′N 46°19′E
- Country: Iraq
- Capital: Nasiriyah
- Governor: Yahia Nasseri

Area
  - Total: 12,900 km^{2} (5,000 sq mi)

Population (2024 census)
  - Total: 2,499,468
  - Density: 194/km^{2} (502/sq mi)
- ISO 3166 code: IQ-DQ
- HDI (2024): 0.706 high · 11th of 18
- Website: thiqar.gov.iq

Thi Qar Governorate (Arabic: محافظة ذي قار, romanized: Muḥāfaẓat Ḏī Qār, Arabic: [muħaːfaðˤat ðiː qaːr]) is a governorate in southern Iraq, in the Arabian Peninsula. The provincial capital is Nasiriyah. Prior to 1976 the governorate was known as Muntafiq Governorate. Dhi Qar was the heartland of the ancient Mesopotamian civilization of Sumer, and includes the ruins of Ur, Eridu, Lagash, Larsa, Girsu, Umma, and Bad-tibira. The southern area of the governorate is covered by Mesopotamian Marshes. The governorate also includes the recently established Ur Tourist City, a modern heritage and tourism hub located beside the archaeological site of ancient Ur.

== Government ==
- Governor: Yahia Nasseri
- Deputy Governor: Ahmed al-Sheik Taha
- Governorate Council Chairman (GCC): Ihsan Al-Taei

== Modern Dhi Qar ==
The governorate includes the towns of al-Rifai, Qalat Sukkar, Al Shatrah, al-Gharraf, Suq el-Shuyukh, Khamisiyah, al-Chibayish and al-Dawaya.

In the mid-1990s the governor was Tahir Jalil Habbush al-Tikriti, who later became police chief of the country, and in 1999, director of the Iraqi Intelligence Service.

=== Demographics ===
The population is approximately 2,000,000, predominantly Shia Arab. The southern marshes have traditionally been home to many Marsh Arabs.

As of 2007, the area is very poor, with an unemployment rate of 17% and a poverty rate of 37%.

== Districts ==
- Al-Chibayish
- Al-Rifa'i
- Shatrah
- Nasiriyah
- Suq Al-Shuykh
- Al-Dawaya

== See also ==
- Al-Habboubi Square
- Ayad Radhi
- Cradle of civilization
