= Tarada =

Type of canoe

The tarada (Arabic: طرادة) is a large canoe used by the Marsh Arabs with a long, tapered prow and stern that curve up from the waterline. It is 10–12 metres (33–39 ft) long and 1–1.5 metres (3.3–4.9 ft) wide at its widest point, though ones made for sheikhs could reach up to 13 metres (43 ft) long. It is traditionally made from wood or reeds coated in bitumen and held together with the help of iron nails. The wood used is typically acacia or mulberry. British explorer Wilfred Thesiger described them thus:

She was a beautiful craft that could carry as many as twelve people. Thirty-six feet long but only three and half feet at her widest beam, she was carvel-built, flat-bottomed and covered outside with a smooth coating of bitumen over the wooden planks. The front swept forwards and upwards in a perfect curve to form a long, thin, tapering stem; the stern too rose in a graceful sweep. Two feet of the stern and of the bows were decked; there was a thwart a third of the way forward, and a strengthening beam across the boat two thirds of the way forward. Movable boards covered the floor. The top part of the ribs was planked along the inside and studded with five rows of flat, round nail-heads two inches across. These decorative nails were the distinguishing mark of a tarada

— Wilfred Thesiger

Taradas are traditionally propelled by poling using a type of setting pole called a marda (مردى). In deeper water, oars made from wood and reed are used instead.

Historically the tarada was used as a war canoe or to transport important sheikhs. Iron-plated taradas were used by British and Ottoman forces and their local allies during the Mesopotamian Campaign of World War I. It is considered a type of mashoof.

Most modern taradas are built in the towns of Al-Chibayish and Huwair.
