= Al-Chibayish District =

Al-Chibayish District قضاء الجبايش
- District
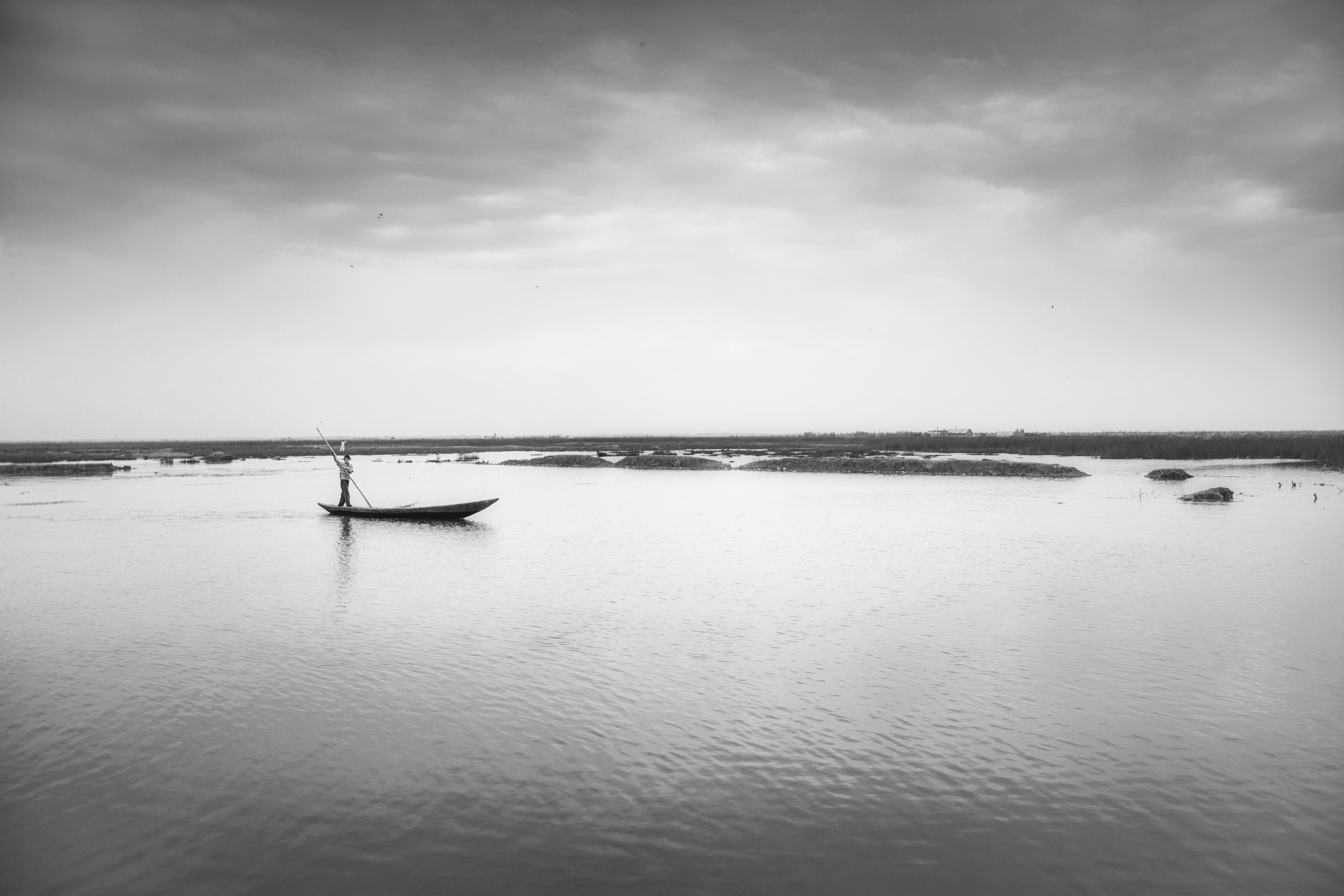
- A Marsh Arab poles a mashoof in Al-Chibayish District
- Interactive map of Al-Chibayish District
- Country: Iraq
- Governorates: Dhi Qar Governorate

Area
  - Total: 2,372.5 km^{2} (916.0 sq mi)
- Elevation: 17 m (56 ft)

Population (2024)
  - Total: 63,204
  - Density: 44.32/km^{2} (114.8/sq mi)
- Time zone: UTC+3 (AST)
- Area code: +964

Al-Chibayish District (Arabic: قضاء الجبايش) is a district of the Dhi Qar Governorate, Iraq, located to the east of Nasiriyah and northwest of Basra Governorate. The district capital is Al-Chibayish. The district's geography is dominated by the Hammar Marshes, a subset of the Mesopotamian Marshes, and by the Euphrates River that feeds the marshes. It is the home of the Bani Asad tribe.
