= Ad Dayr, Iraq =

Town in Basrah Governorate, Iraq

Coordinates: 30.7989°N 47.5755°E

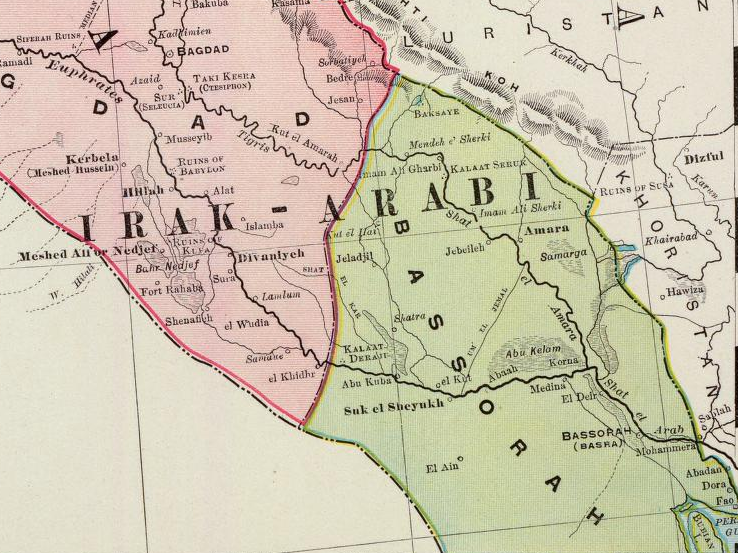
Basra Province 1897

Ad Dayr (Arabic: الدير) is a town of Basrah Governorate in southern Iraq, on the west bank of the Shatt Al-Arab River. The town has one of the few bridges over the Shatt Al-Arab.

The area is close to the Mesopotamian Marshes(Hammar Marshes), and has traditionally been home to many Marsh Arabs. The town has two mosques, a girls school, and a holy shrine of Solomon.

The area suffered greatly during the Iran–Iraq War, during which it was a major battlefield, and again after the 1991 Iraqi uprising.
