= Al-Shatrah District =

Coordinates: 31.4°N 46.3°E

Al-Shatra District قضاء الشطرة
- District
- Interactive map of Al-Shatra District
- Country: Iraq
- Governorates: Dhi Qar Governorate
- Time zone: UTC+3 (AST)

Al-Shatra District (Arabic: قضاء الشطرة) is a district of the Dhi Qar Governorate, Iraq.
