= Shroug =

Iraqi Shia Arab social group

Shroug (Arabic: الشروق; Iraqi Arabic: الشروگ; lit. "easterners") is a term in Iraq used to describe a Shia Arab social group from southern Iraq. The term “Shroug” has historically been used by native Baghdadis to refer to Shia tribes that migrated from southern Iraq and later settled in eastern Baghdad, particularly in the area formerly known as Al‑Thawra District, which is today called Sadr City. Native residents of Baghdad often viewed the arrival of these tribes with disapproval, as they perceived them to be less urbanized and more strongly characterized by tribal and rural social structures.

== History ==
The term Shroug was used by the Sunni tribes of the Middle Euphrates to refer to the Shia tribes around Amara District. Shroug literally meant "easterners" and was sometimes used as a slur. Later, the term expanded to include all of southern Iraq. The Sunni tribes of the Middle Euphrates boasted that they are more civilized than the Shroug who were open to influence from iran.

The extreme poverty and social stigmatism of the Shroug later changed after Abdul-Karim Qasim came to power. Their number in 1958 was estimated at 100,000 people. The Qasim government built Al‑Thawra District which translate to the revolution district, named after the 14 July Revolution, and was called Sadam city during Sadam Hussein rule, after 2003 the district name was changed again and was called Sadr City as a complex where Shroug were settled. The Shroug later increased their social prominence as they began migrating from the countryside to the cities. Some Shroug also resided in the Marshes alongside the Marsh Arabs. Although the term Shroug initially referred to Amara District, it later was used to refer to Shia from southern and southeastern Iraq. Others claimed that the term Shroug had Mesopotamian origins, either from "Sharubak", meaning "the natives" in Sumerian, or from "Sherk", which occurred in the name of Sharrukin, which meant "just" or "righteous" in Akkadian.
