= Qalat Sukkar =

Sikkar Castle قلعة سكر Qal‘at es Sikkar
- Location in Iraq
- Coordinates: 31°51′32″N 46°04′38″E
- Country: Iraq
- Governorate: Dhi Qar Governorate
- Elevation: 39 ft (12 m)

Population (2014)
  - Total: 110,000
- Time zone: 5

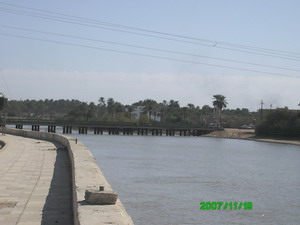
Bridge over the Gharraf Canal at Qalat Sukkar

Qalat Sukkar (Arabic: قلعة سكر, romanized: Qal`at es Sikar, lit. 'Sugar Castle') is a town in the Dhi Qar Governorate, Iraq, located on the Gharraf Canal.

== Demographics ==
Qalat Sukkar has a population of 110,000.

== Location ==
Qalat Sukar is located on a ridge west of the Gharraf Canal (the old canal that the Sumerians dug up some 4000 years ago). Qalat Sukar is 6 km northeast of the remains of the ancient Sumerian city of Larsa. A modern drainage canal separates Qalat Sukar from Larsa Tell.

James Abbott Sauer and Khair Yassine, believe that because of the name, and the former marshlands in the area, it is likely that Qalat Sukar was originally the site of a sugar mill, constructed after sugarcane was introduced into the area in the ninth century.

The nearest large city is An Nasiriyah, Iraq with a population of 587,000.

== Airfield ==
During the Iraq War, the Qalat Sukkar Airfield was occupied by the US Marines and called Camp Fenway.
