= Mesopotamian Marshes =

Wetlands in Iraq, Iran and Kuwait

Coordinates: 31°00′N 47°00′E

Mesopotamian Marshes Tigris-Euphrates alluvial salt marsh
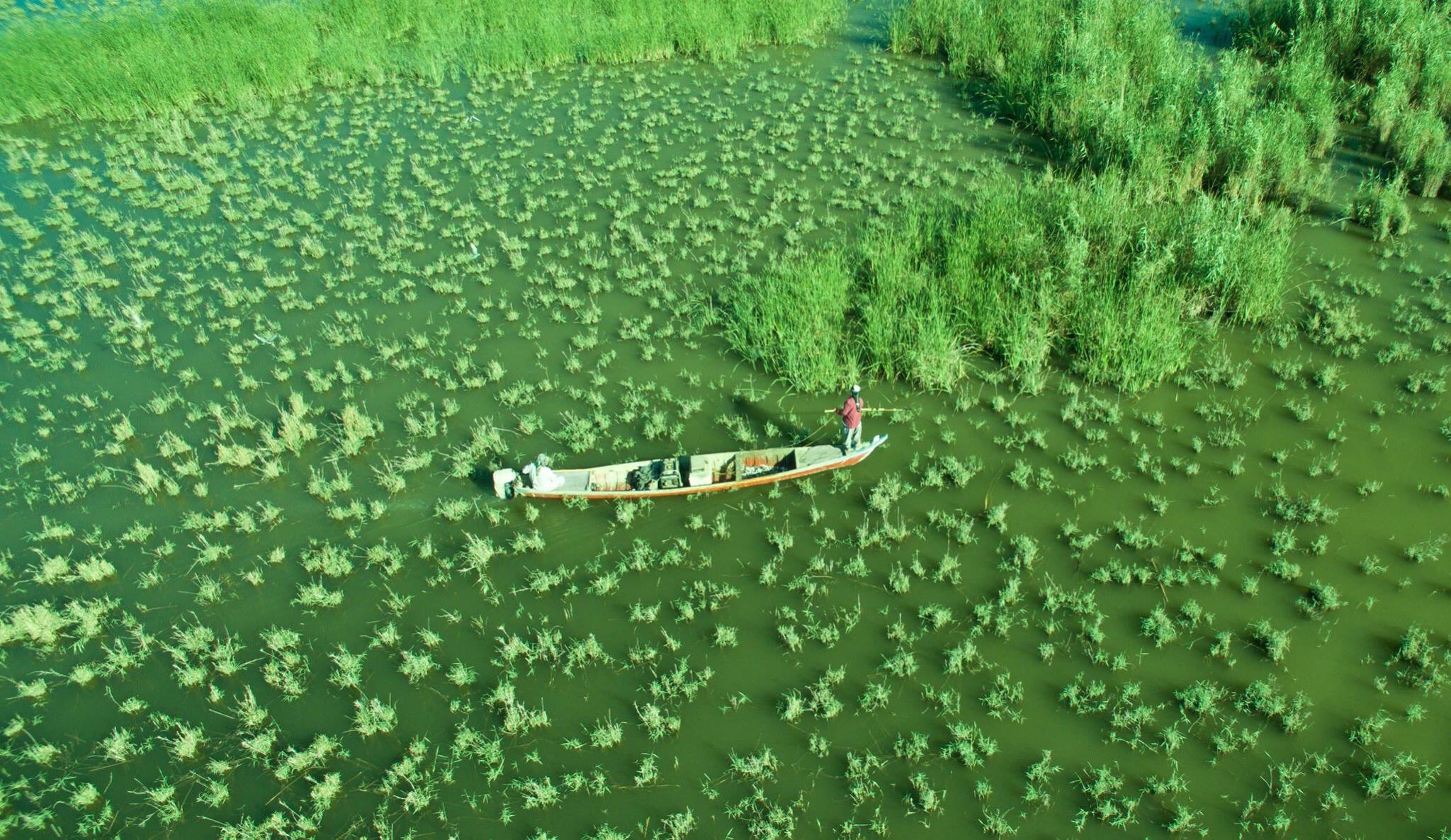
- Chibaish Marshes

- Location of the Mesopotamian Marshes (Tigris-Euphrates alluvial salt marsh)

Ecology
- Realm: Palearctic
- Biome: flooded grasslands and savannas
- Borders: Arabian Desert; South Iran Nubo-Sindian desert and semi-desert, Zagros Mountains forest steppe

Geography
- Area: 35,572 km^{2} (13,734 mi^{2})
- Countries: Iraq; Iran; Kuwait

Conservation
- Conservation status: Critical/endangered
- Protected: 3,070 km² (9%)

The Mesopotamian Marshes, also known as the Iraqi Marshes, are a wetland area located in southern Iraq and southwestern Iran as well as partially in northern Kuwait. The marshes are primarily located on the floodplains of the Euphrates and Tigris rivers bound by the cities of Basra, Nasiriyah, Amarah and a portion of southwestern Iran and northern Kuwait (particularly Bubiyan Island). Historically the marshlands, mainly composed of the separate but adjacent Central, Hawizeh and Hammar Marshes, used to be the largest wetland ecosystem of western Eurasia. The unique wetland landscape is home to the Marsh people, who have developed a unique culture tightly coupled to the landscape – harvesting reeds and rice, fishing, and herding water buffalo.

Draining of portions of the marshes began in the 1950s and continued through the 1970s to reclaim land for agriculture and oil exploration. In the late 1980s and 1990s, during the presidency of Saddam Hussein, this work was expanded and accelerated to evict Marsh people from the marshes. Before 2003, the marshes were drained to 10% of their original size. Since the American overthrow of Hussein in 2003, the marshes have partially recovered. However, drought along with upstream dam construction and operation in Turkey, Syria, and Iran have hindered the process. The Mesopotamian marshes were listed as an UNESCO Heritage Site in 2016.

== Geography ==
Satellite image of the Mesopotamian Marshes, 2000–2009

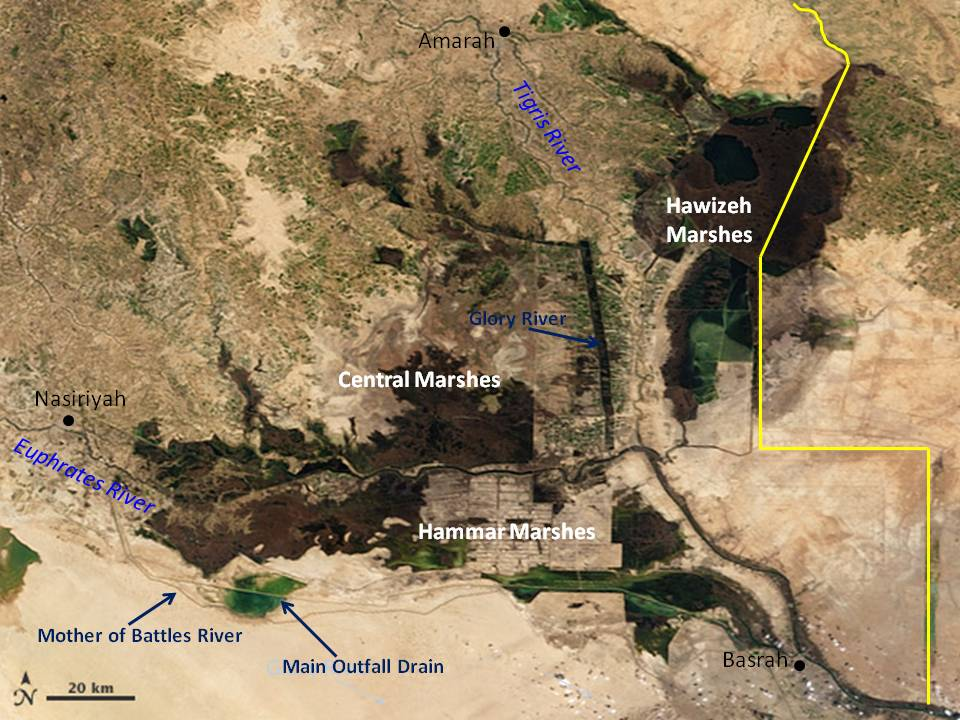
Mesopotamian Marshes in 2007

As its name suggests, the Mesopotamian Marshes are located in the larger region of Mesopotamia. Originally covering an area of 20,000 km^{2} (7,700 mi^{2}) and divided into three major areas, the Central Marshes lie between the Tigris and Euphrates, while the Hammar Marshes lie south of the Euphrates and the Hawizeh Marshes are bound east of the Tigris. Before the 2003 Invasion of Iraq, about 90% of the marshes had been drained.

The marshes lie on a flat alluvial plain, as the Euphrates decreases only 12 m (39 ft) in elevation during its last 300 km (190 mi) while the Tigris falls 24 m (79 ft). This delta provides an environment that allows the Tigris and Euphrates to meander, forming distributaries. The Euphrates has often terminated near Nasiriyah into the Hammar Marshes as its flow slows. The Tigris can distribute some of its flow into the Central and Hawizeh marshes as it slows near Amarah. Downstream of Amarah, though, several of its tributaries originating in Iran allow the Tigris's flow to increase, and it maintains a steady course thereafter. The three marshes once provided an intertwined environment, particularly during periods of flooding as the rivers overflowed.

=== Central ===
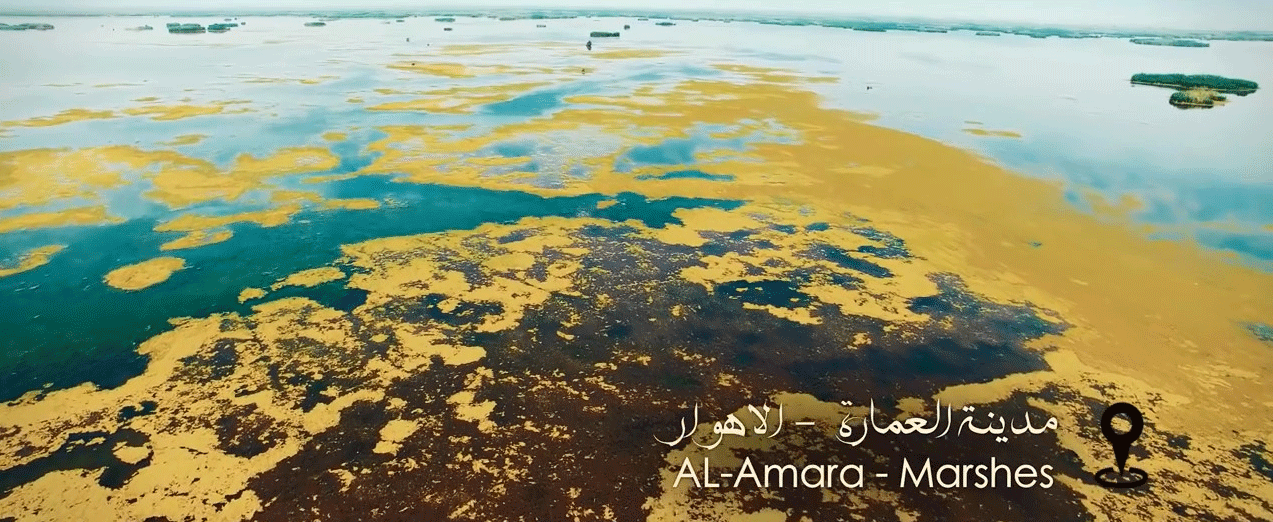
The marshes of southern Iraq in Maysan Governorate

The Central Marshes receive water from influxes of the Tigris's distributaries, namely the Shatt al-Muminah and Majar al-Kabir south of Amarah. The Tigris serves as the marshes' eastern boundary while the Euphrates serves as its southern boundary. Covering an area of 3,000 km^{2} (1,200 mi^{2}), the marshes consist of reed beds and several permanent lakes including Umm al Binni lake. The Al-Zikri and Hawr Umm Al-Binni lakes are two of the notable lakes and are 3 m (9.8 ft) deep.

=== Hammar ===
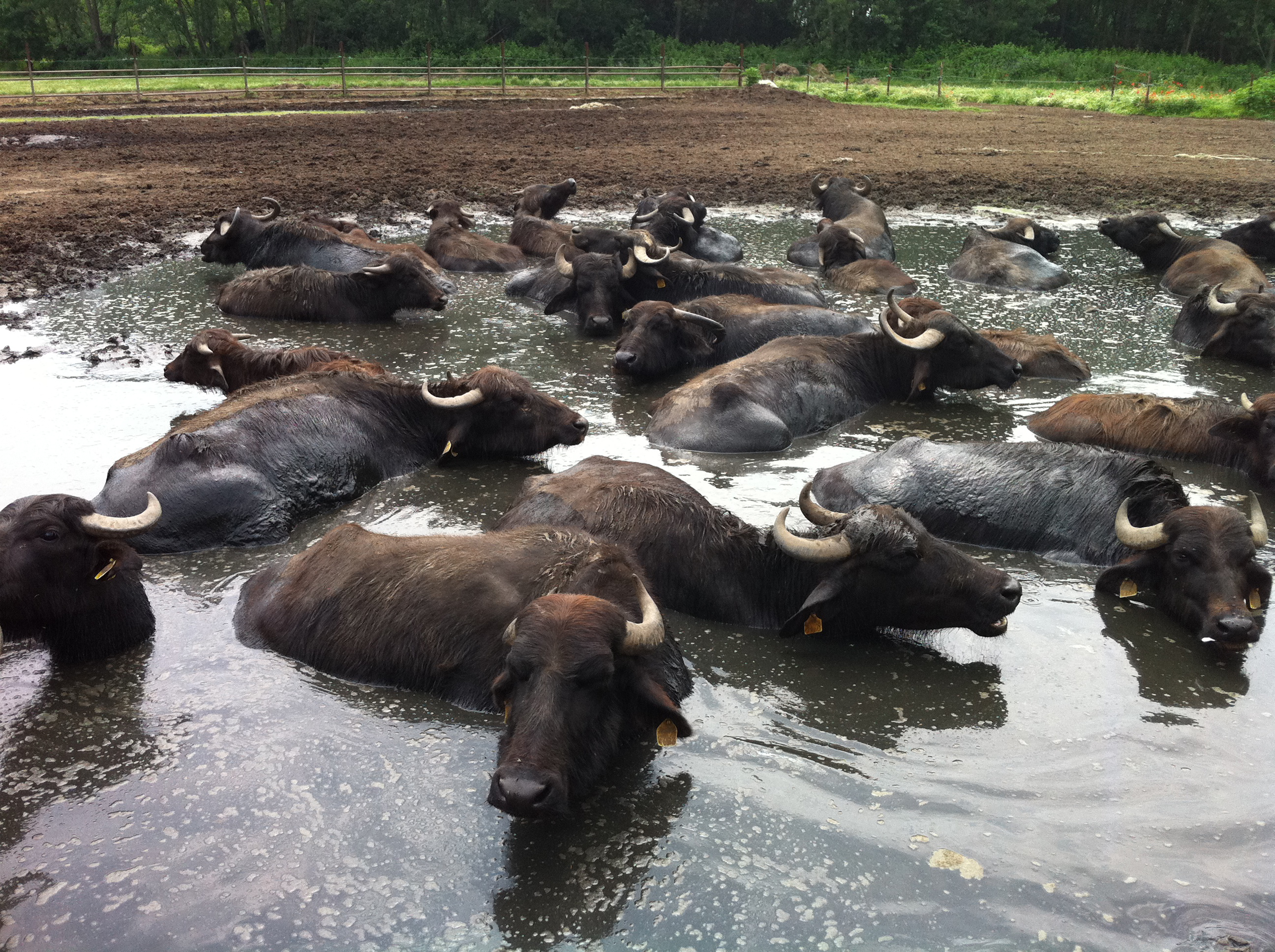
Water buffaloes are found in the marshes. The seal of a scribe employed by an Akkadian king shows the sacrifice of water buffaloes.

The Hammar Marshes are primarily fed by the Euphrates and lie south of it with a western extent to Nasiriyah, eastern border of the Shatt al-Arab and southern extent of Basrah. Normally, the marshes are a 2,800 km^{2} (1,100 mi^{2}) area of permanent marsh and lake but during period of flooding can extend to 4,500 km^{2} (1,700 mi^{2}). In periods of flooding, water from the Central Marsh, fed by the Tigris can overflow and supply the marshes with water. Hammar Lake is the largest water body within the marsh and has an area of 120 km (75 mi) by 250 km (160 mi), with depths ranging between 1.8 m (5.9 ft)-3 m (9.8 ft). In the summer, large portion of the marshes' and lake's shore are exposed, revealing islands that are used for agriculture.

=== Hawizeh ===
The Hawizeh Marshes lie east of the Tigris and a portion lie in Iran. The Iranian side of the marshes, known as Hawr Al-Azim, is fed by the Karkheh River, while the Tigris distributaries Al-Musharrah and Al-Kahla supply the Iraqi side, only with much less water than the Karkheh. During spring flooding, the Tigris may directly flow into the marshes. The marshes are drained by the Al-Kassarah. This river plays a critical role in maintaining the Al-Hawizeh marshes as a flow-through system and preventing it from becoming a closed saline basin.

The marshes are 80 km (50 mi) from north to south and about 30 km (19 mi) from east to west, covering a total area of 3,000 km^{2} (1,200 mi^{2}). Permanent portions of the marshes include the northern and central portion while the southern part is generally seasonal. Moderately dense vegetation can be found in the permanent areas along with large 6 m (20 ft)-deep lakes in the northern portions. As the Hawizeh Marshes fared the best during the draining, they can facilitate the reproduction of flora, fauna and other species in Central and Hammar marshes.

== Ecology ==
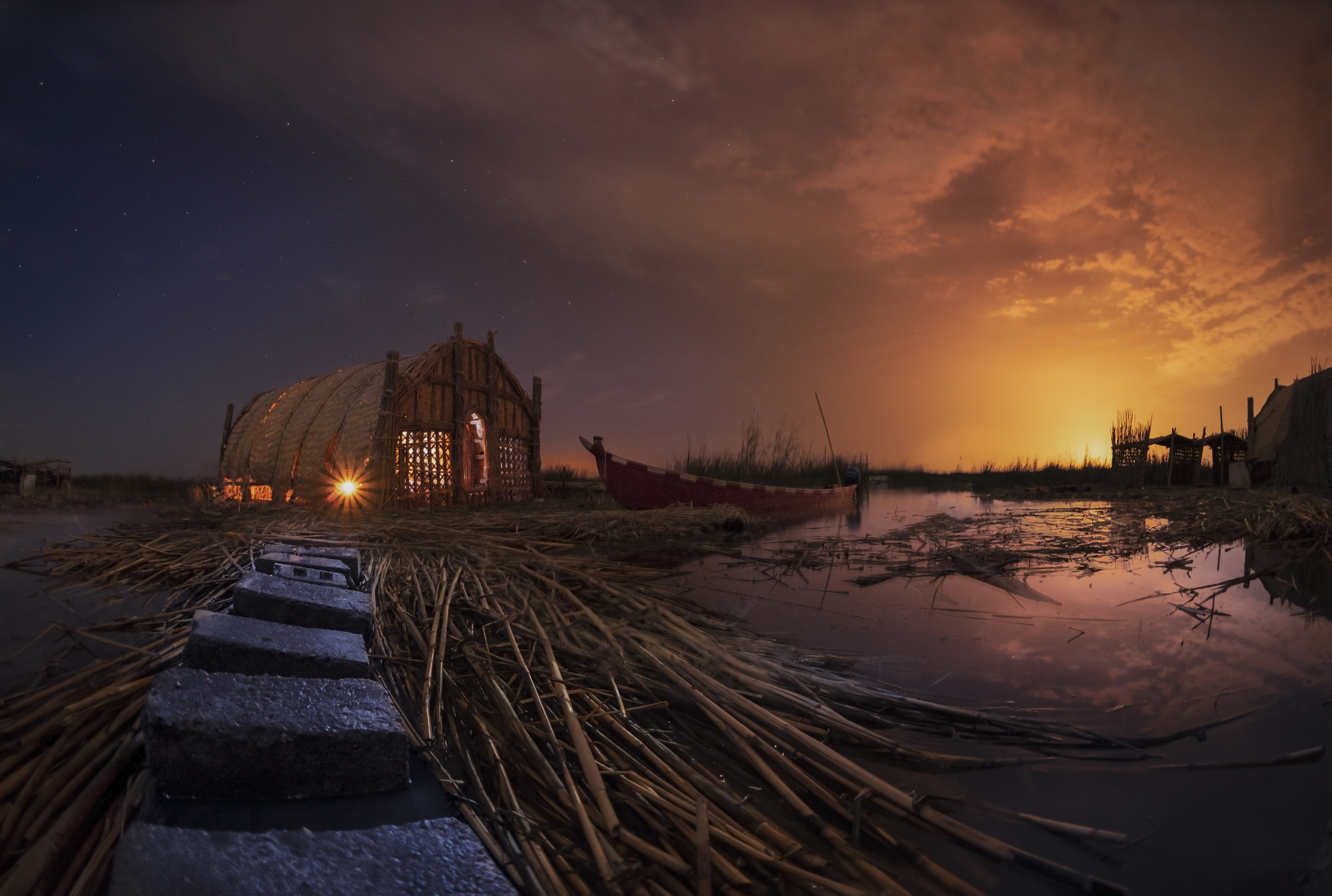
Mesopotamian Marshes at night, southern Iraq; reed house (Mudhif) and narrow canoe (Mashoof) in the water, 2019

The marshes constitute a flooded grasslands and savannas ecoregion, also known as the Tigris-Euphrates alluvial salt marsh. The ecoregion includes both the Mesopotamian Marshes and the Shadegan Ponds, a wetland on the lower Karun River in neighboring Iran. The marshes are integral to coastal health, filtering out pollutants and waste before they reach the Gulf, though this capacity was significantly degraded after their draining. The marshes also serve as spawning and nursery sites for coastal fish and shrimp species.

The seasonal and permanent marshlands are dominated by aquatic plants, including reeds (Phragmites australis), cattail rushes (Typha domingensis), and papyrus sedge (Cyperus papyrus). Riparian forests of poplar (mainly Populus euphratica), tamarisk (Tamarix pentandra and Tamarix meyeri), and willow (mainly Salix acmophylla) occur on islands and river banks.

The marshes are home to 40 species of bird and several species of fish. It demarcates a range limit for a number of bird species. Flamingos, pelicans and herons inhabit the marshes. The marshes were once home to a large number of birds and the stopover for many other migratory birds as they traveled from Siberia to Africa. At risk are 40% to 60% of the world's marbled teal population that live in the marshes, along with 90% of the world's population of Basra reed-warbler. Also at risk are the sacred ibis and African darter. A subspecies of the hooded crow known as the Mesopotamian crow is found in this part of southern Iraq. Seven species are now extinct from the marshes, including the Indian crested porcupine, the Bunn's short-tailed bandicoot rat and the marsh gray wolf. The draining of the marshes caused a significant decline in bioproductivity; following the Multi-National Force overthrow of the Saddam Hussein regime, water flow to the marshes was restored and the ecosystem has begun to recover.

Considerable confusion has existed relating to the status of the Eurasian otter and the endemic maxwelli subspecies of the smooth-coated otter in the region, but recent surveys have confirmed that both still survive.

== Inhabitants ==
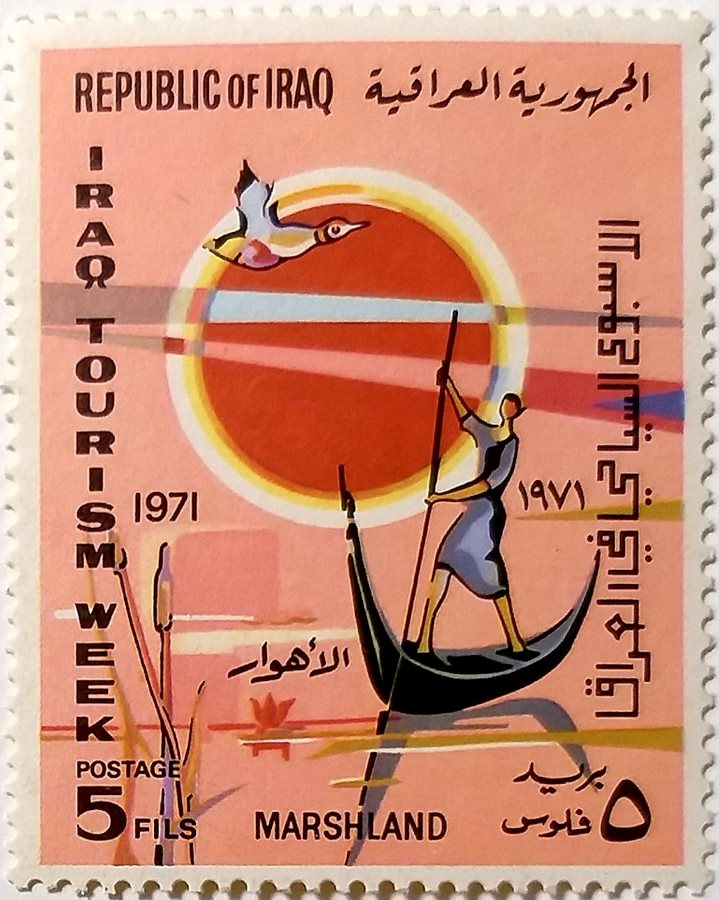
An Iraqi 5-fils postage stamp issued in 1971 depicting the marshes, released to promote tourism week in Iraq

Maʻdān live in secluded villages of elaborate reed houses throughout the marshes, often only reached by boat. Fish, rice cultivation, water buffalo and other resources are also used in their daily lives. In the 1950s, there were an estimated 500,000 Marsh Arabs. This population shrank to about 20,000 following the draining and Saddam's violent reprisals, and between 80,000 and 120,000 fled to neighboring Iran. Following the 2003 Iraq invasion, Marsh Arabs have begun to return to the marshes. Many hacked down the dikes and dams that Saddam had built.

The Iraqi government has provided support via channels like the Iraq Cultural Health Fund, which funds Marsh Arabs in their efforts to protect traditional cultural practices. Nevertheless, Marsh Arabs remain one of Iraq’s most underserved populations, struggling to obtain healthcare, clean drinking water, and adequate nutrition.

As the marshes become increasingly saline and polluted, many Marsh Arabs are once again being forced to relocate. For those who remain, their traditional lifestyle is threatened. The marshes supplied 60 percent of Iraq’s fish; that number has dwindled to the single digits. This, combined with the lack of potable water for raising water buffalo, is driving some Marsh Arabs to marsh perimeters, where they farm grain.

== History ==
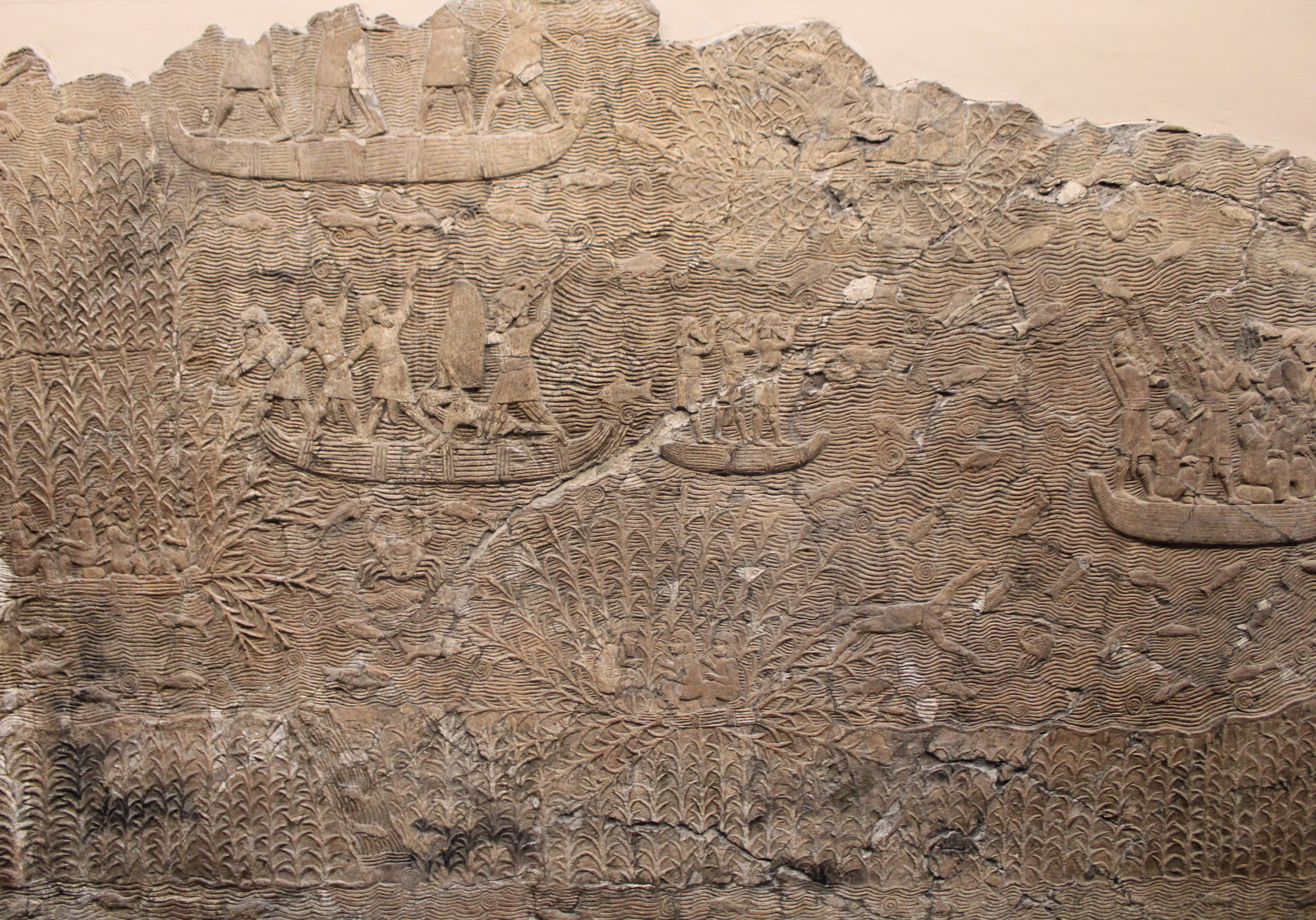
Campaign in the marshes of southern Babylonia during the reign of Ashurbanipal. Showing Assyrian soldiers on boat chasing enemies trying to run away; some are hiding in the reeds.

In the 4th millennium BCE, the first literate societies emerged in Southern Mesopotamia, often referred to as the "Cradle of Civilization", and the first cities and complex state bureaucracies were developed there during the Uruk period. Due to the geographical location and ecological factors of the Fertile Crescent, a crescent-shape fertile area running from the basins of the Nile in Egypt, northwards along the Mediterranean coast in Palestine and Israel, and southwards again along the Euphrates and the Tigris towards the Persian Gulf, civilizations were able to develop agricultural and technological programmes. The crucial trigger was the availability of wild edible plant species. Farming arose early in the Fertile Crescent because the area had a large quantity of wild wheat and pulse species that were nutritious and easy to domesticate.

In the 10th and 11th centuries, the marshes were the site of the state of Batihah founded by 'Imran ibn Shahin.

=== Draining and subsequent restoration efforts ===
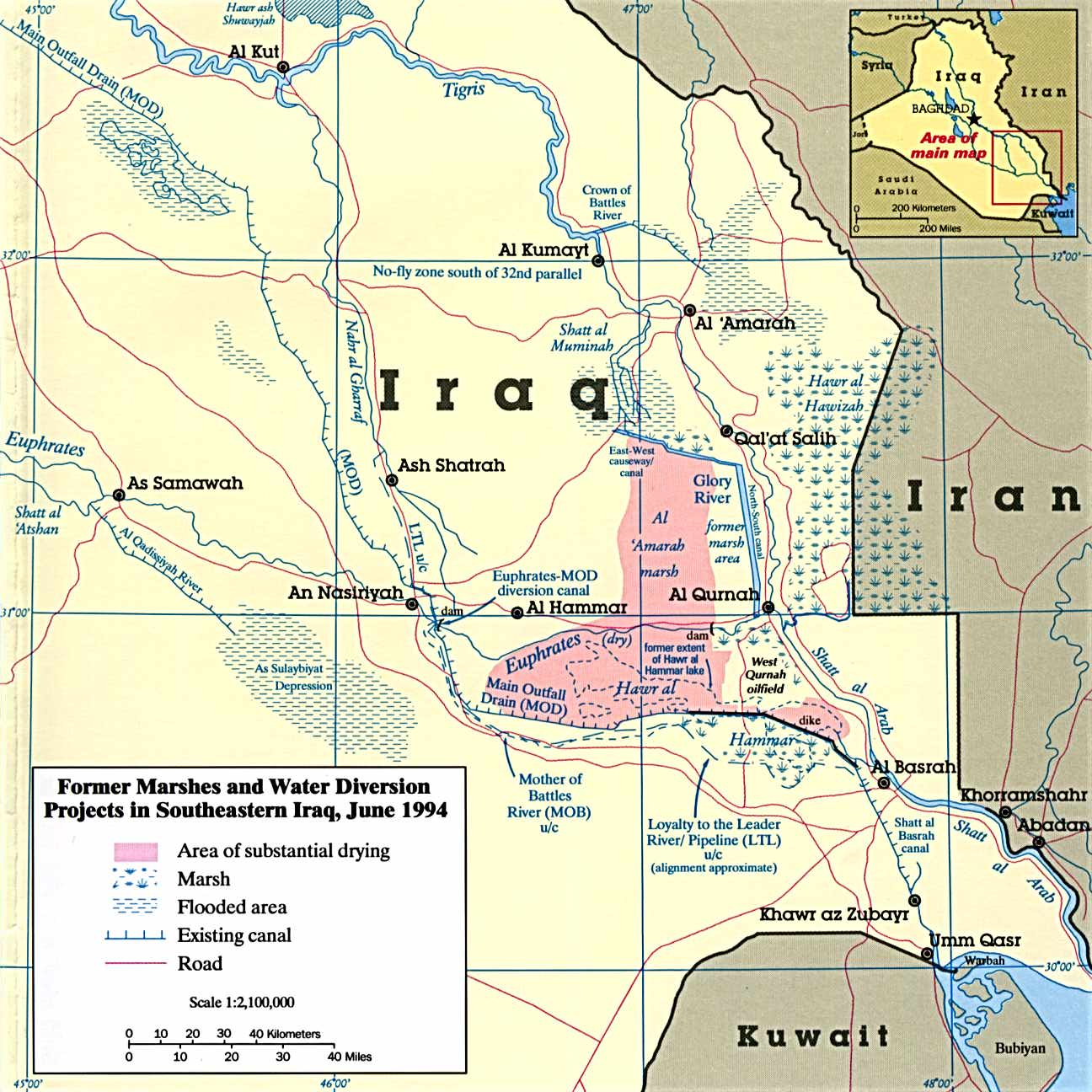
1994 map of the Mesopotamian Marshes with draining features

The draining of Mesopotamian Marshes began in the 1950s with the Central Marshes and gradually accelerated as it affected the two other main marshes until early in the 21st century with the 2003 invasion of Iraq. The draining of the marshes was intended at first to reclaim land for agriculture along with oil exploration but later served as a punishment for Shia Arabs in response to the 1991 uprisings in Iraq. The draining of the marshes was largely due to dams, dykes and other diversion structures constructed into Iraq but were exacerbated by upstream dam construction in Syria and Turkey.

While the British engineers worked with the Iraqi government, Frank Haigh developed the Haigh Report in 1951. His report recommended a complex of canals, sluices, and dykes on the lower portions of both the Tigris and Euphrates. These water control structures could be used to drain marshes therefore creating profitable farmland. In 1953, construction began on the Third River or Main Outfall Drain and later the Saddam River which would drain water from the Central Marsh under the Euphrates and through a canal eventually into the Persian Gulf. Work on the Third River and other draining projects, particularly for the Hawizeh Marsh, quickly progressed in the 1980s during the Iran–Iraq War in order to afford Iraqis a tactical advantage in the marshes. Part of the Hammar Marshes was also drained in 1985 to clear area for oil exploration.

After the 1991 Gulf War, Shia Muslims in southern Iraq rebelled against Saddam Hussein, who in turn crushed the rebellion and further accelerated the draining of the Central and Hammar marshes in order to evict Shias that have taken refuge in the marshes. With the exception of the Nasiriyah Drainage Pump Station, the 565 km (351 mi) Third River was completed in 1992 and two other canals were constructed south and nearly parallel to it. One, the Mother of Battles canal, was constructed to divert the flow of the Euphrates south below the Hammar Marsh. Second, the 240 km (150 mi) Loyalty to Leader Canal also known as the Basrah Sweetwater Canal, which originates in the lower Euphrates region, collected water from the terminus of the Gharraf River and diverted it under the Euphrates, away from the Central Marshes and below the Hammar Marshes towards Basrah. The Glory River was also constructed to divert water from the Tigris's southern-flowing distributaries east and parallel along the Tigris until they reached the Euphrates near its confluence with the Tigris at Qurna.

By the 2003 invasion of Iraq, the marshes had lost 90% of their size from the previous decades. The Central and Hammar Marshes were nearly drained and only 35% of the Hawizeh Marshes remained. After the invasion, locals destroyed dikes. The combined efforts of the Iraq government, United Nations, U.S. agencies and record precipitation in Turkey helped begin a restoration of the marshes. As of late 2006, 58% of the original marshes had been reinundated. The Nasiriyah Drainage Pump Station was completed in 2009, affording the Third River to be used for agricultural drainage. Recent drought and continued upstream dam construction and operation in Turkey, Syria, and Iran have reduced the marshes to around 30% of their original size by 2009. Turkey has built at least 34 dams on the Tigris and Euphrates rivers, threatening marsh recovery.

From a high of around 75% restored in 2008, the wetlands receded to 58% of their average pre-drained level by spring 2015. Meanwhile, as the water level fell, salinity increased to 15,000 parts per million in some areas, up from 300 to 500 ppm in the 1980s. "When the river water levels were high, the low-saline Tigris washed over the marshes, cleansed them, and pushed the salty residue into the saltier Euphrates, which flows along the western edge. But now the Tigris is so low that the Euphrates provides most of the water in the marshes."

The government prioritizes providing water to cities along the Tigris and the Shatt al-Arab, resulting in reduced flow to the marshes.

=== Threats from climate change and pollution ===
Temperatures in the region have risen over 0.5 degrees Celsius per decade, causing drought in Iraq and in neighbors whose waters flow into the Tigris and Euphrates. Combined with upriver dams, this reduction in water has caused the three primary marshes to fragment into ten smaller marshes.

Massive amounts of untreated sewage and other pollutants are dumped into the Tigris and Euphrates, moving downstream into the marshes and further degrading the water quality.

== See also ==
- Battle of the Marshes
- Tigris–Euphrates river system
- Shatt al-Arab
- Geography of Iraq
