= Yahia Nasseri =

Iraqi politician

Yahia Nasseri يحيى الناصري

Governor of Dhi Qar
- Incumbent
- Assumed office 2016
- President: Fuad Masum

Personal details
- Born: Dhi Qar Governorate, Iraq
- Occupation: Politician

Yahia Nasseri (Arabic: يحيى الناصري; ) is an Iraqi politician who has been the Governor of Dhi Qar since 2016.
