= Al-Chibayish =

Al-Chibayish الجبايش
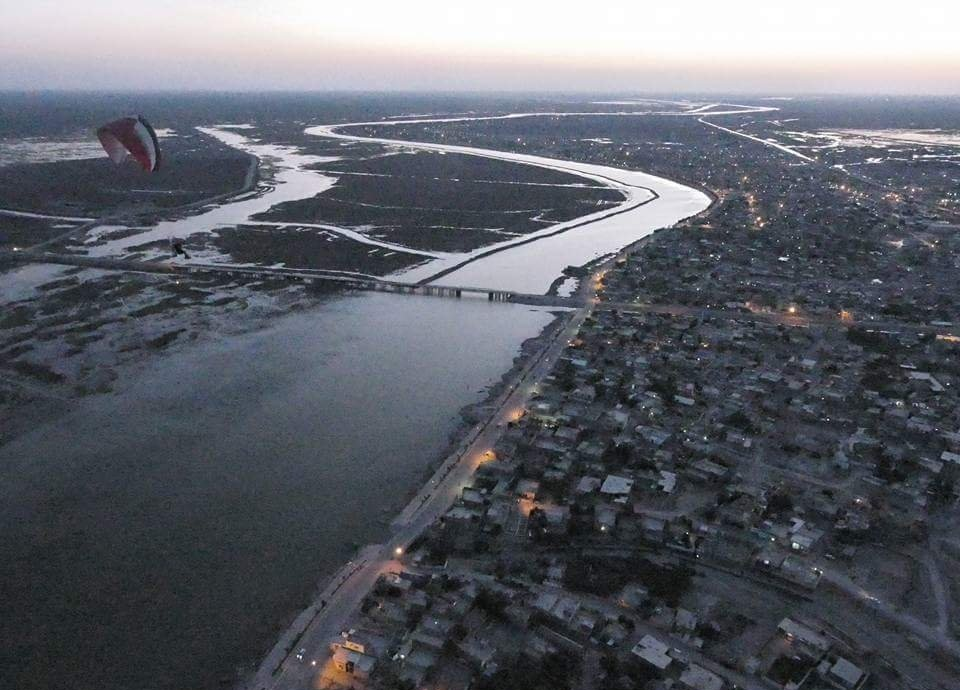
- Al-Chibayish from the air
- Nickname: City of the Marshes
- Location within Iraq
- Coordinates: 30°57′17.7″N 46°58′30.3″E
- Country: Iraq
- Governorate: Dhi Qar
- District: Al-Chibayish
- Elevation: 9 m (30 ft)

Population (2014)
  - Total: 36,100
- Time zone: UTC+3 (AST)
- Postal code: 09640
- Area code: 01

Al-Chibayish is a town on the Euphrates River in Al-Chibayish District, Dhi Qar governorate, in southern Iraq. It is the capital of its eponymous district.

Al-Chibayish is inhabited primarily by Marsh Arabs of the Banu Asad tribe. Al-Chibayish has historically been an important hub for the Marsh Arab people and a traditional boat-building center for their mashoof canoes.

== History ==
Al-Chibayish was historically home to a community of Mandaeans, as well as Arabs. In 1895, Sheikh Ṣaḥan ibn Sheikh Ṣagar (Ṣaqar in standard Arabic), a Mandaean priest, was arrested near Chabāyish in Iraq and imprisoned in Basra. He was accused of supporting an Arab tribal rebellion led by Jāsim al-Khayyūn (of the Bani Asad tribe, one of the largest tribes affiliated with the Al-Muntafiq), as well as killing his nephew. Although a petition was delivered to the British authorities to have him released, and the British attempted to assist Sheikh Sahan, he was not released and died in prison in 1898.

Al-Chibayish was the subject of a groundbreaking 1955 ethnographic study, Marsh Dwellers of the Euphrates Delta, by Iraqi anthropologist Shakir Mustafa Salim.

Al-Chibayish was home to about 11,000 people in 1955. Al-Chibayish's population dropped to less than 6,000 by 2003 as a result of Saddam Hussein's draining of the Mesopotamian Marshes and his associated campaign of violence against the Marsh Arabs, during which Al-Chibayish was attacked by military helicopters. However, the population recovered and quintupled between 2001 and 2009, when it reached an estimated 30,416 people.
