= Mashoof =

Traditional canoe of southern Iraq

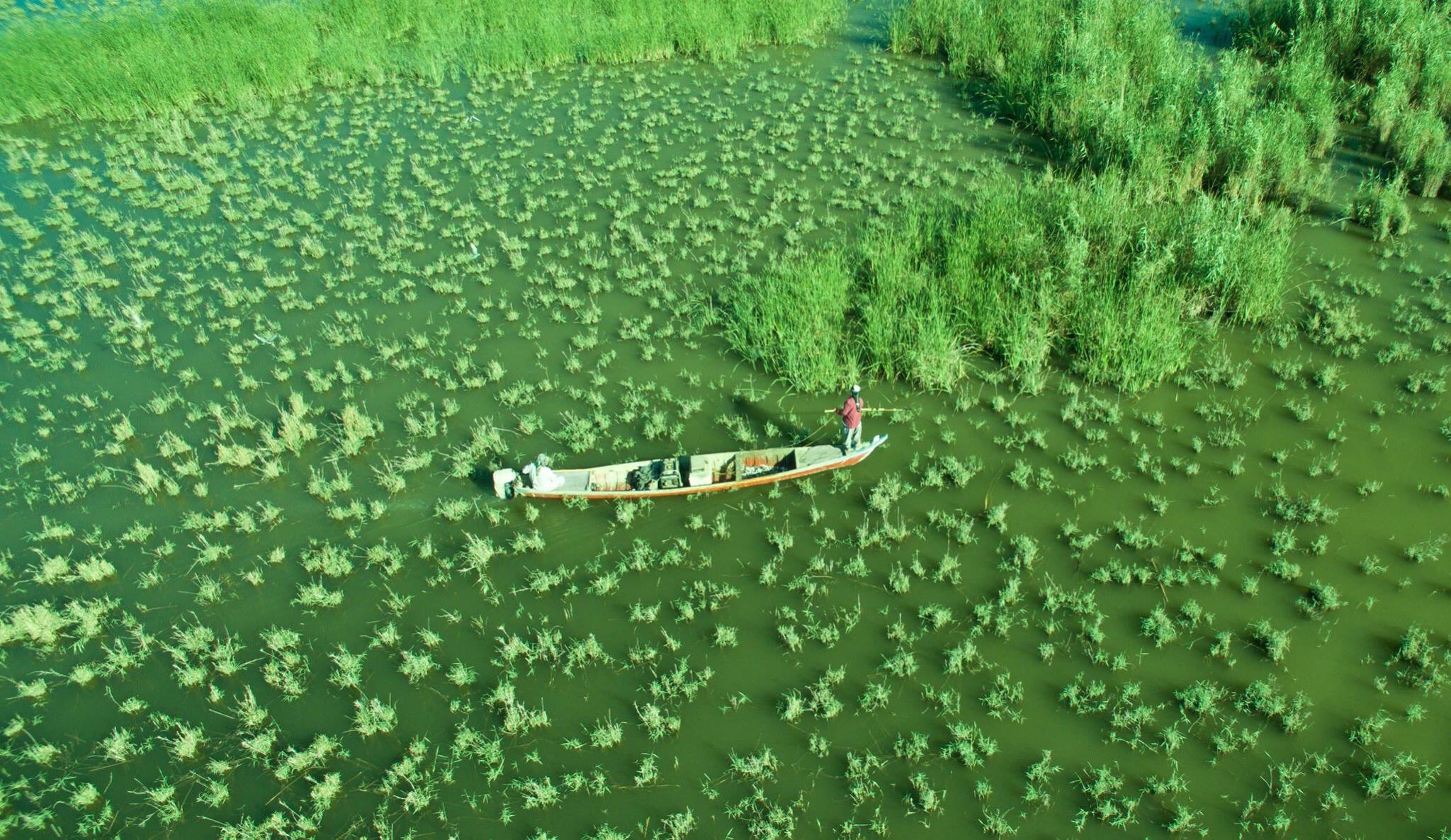
Marsh Arab poling a mashoof

A mashoof (Arabic: مشحوف), also transliterated mashuf, is a long and narrow canoe traditionally used on the Mesopotamian Marshes and rivers of southern Iraq. It was widely used by the Marsh Arabs, or Ahwaris (عرب الأهوار), as a fishing boat, water taxi, and primary means of transportation for people and goods. The mashoof's skinniness makes it an ideal vessel for navigating between the reeds and grasses of the marshes.

Traditional mashoof building is close to extinction in modern Iraq, as a result of the draining of the Iraqi Marshes and the rise of gas-powered skiffs, which can carry heavier loads than a mashoof. Less than 50 mashoof manufacturers are left in southern Iraq, located mainly in the cities of Basra, Hillah and Kufa. However, as the marshes have become re-flooded, mashoof use has slowly begun to return. Mashoof racing, particularly by women, has also returned to the marshes.

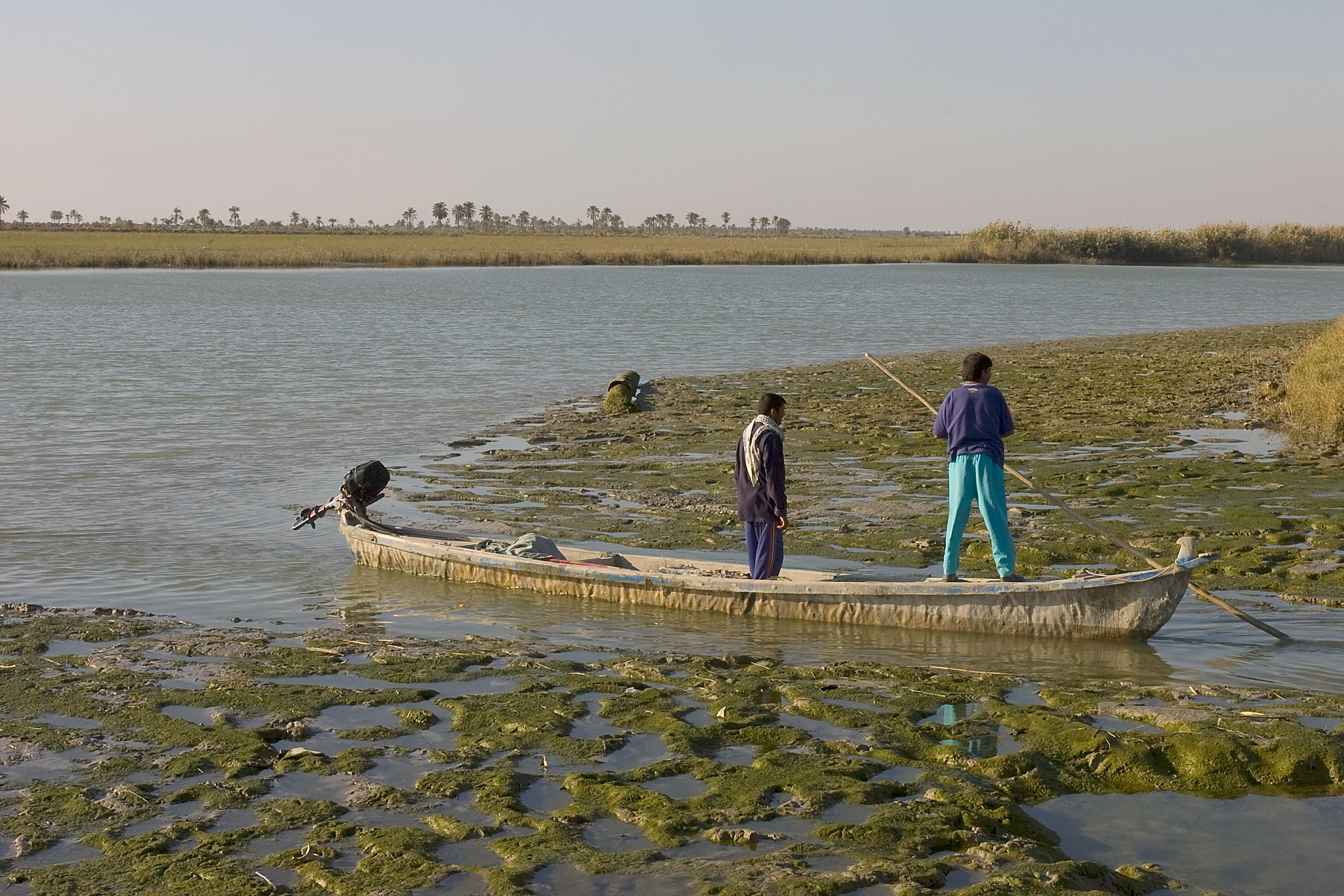
Fishermen pole along an irrigation channel in a mashoof with an outboard motor in Basra Governorate

== History ==
The mashoof dates back to ancient Sumer, c. 5,000 BCE. A mashoof was found in the ancient Sumerian city of Ur, and cylindrical reliefs from the Sumerian and Babylonian periods have been found depicting mashoofs (also pluralized mashāheef, مشاحيف, in Arabic).

The mashoof forms an integral part of Marsh Arab culture, as it is their primary means of transportation. All Marsh Arabs have a mashoof of their own, including children. They use it for gathering reeds, fishing and hunting, tending to their water buffalo, and carrying passengers and cargo. Mashoof repairmen called gallaf are common in most Marsh Arab villages. The importance of mashoofs in southern Iraq makes them a common subject of poems, songs, and other tributes.

In June 2017, Iraqi Prime Minister Haider al-Abadi rode in a mashoof during a visit to Al-Chibayish, making him the first modern Iraqi leader to do so.

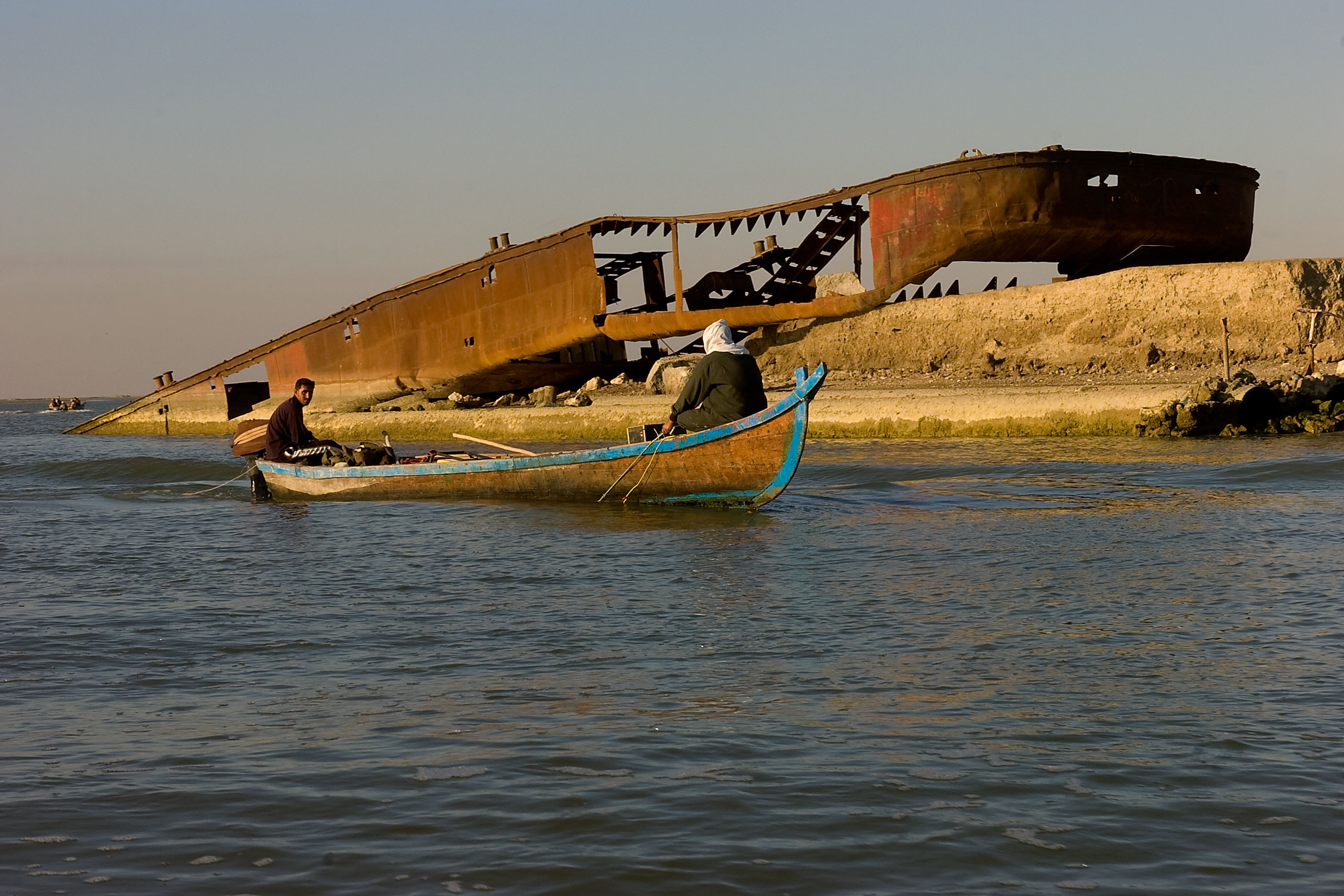
Fishermen travel along an irrigation channel in a mashoof in Basra Governorate

=== Draining of the Iraqi Marshes ===
Mashoof use declined precipitously in the 20th century because of the draining of the Iraqi Marshes. The marshes, which had covered an area of 7,700 square miles (20,000 km^{2}) in 1950, were reduced to 3,500 square miles (9,100 km^{2}) by the 1970s. Following the 1991 Gulf War and the subsequent use of the marshes as a base for a failed anti-government uprising, Saddam Hussein launched an aggressive drainage campaign that reduced the marshes to only 290 square miles (750 km^{2}). The draining of the marshes and the associated government campaign of violence against the Marsh Arabs displaced all but 1,600 of them and destroyed much of their traditional culture, including the use of the mashoof. Following the American invasion of Iraq in 2003, the marshes began to be slowly re-flooded. Initially, re-flooding was done by the local Marsh Arabs destroying dikes and levees on their own. However, the United Nations Environment Programme and reformed Iraqi government have also stepped in and have restored most of the marshes by 2008, enabling the mashoof to return to use.

== Construction ==
Mashoof can be made from many different materials, including the reeds or papyrus that grow in the Marshes and wood from trees such as mulberry, cedar and Jasmine. Today, fiberglass is often used instead of wood. Cotton fills the gaps between the wooden panels, and the whole thing is then coated in pitch and tar to prevent leaking. The tar is traditionally sourced from Hīt in Anbar Governorate, a town on the Euphrates that has been famed for its tar and bitumen since ancient times. Historically, mashoof building was concentrated in the towns of Al-Chibayish and Huwair and in settlements on the banks of the Shatt al-Arab, especially Abu Al-Khaseeb, and was practiced primarily by Mandaeans. Mashoof cost from $500 to $1000 to manufacture, though high-end ones can reach as much as $4,000.

Reed and tar mashoofs are easier and cheaper to make than wooden ones, so they were traditionally more widely used, particularly by children. However, wooden mashoofs are more durable (a reed mashoof needs to be repaired or even replaced annually) and so have become much more popular in the last two centuries.

Mashoof are traditionally steered and propelled with a type of setting pole called a marda (المردى). A marda is 3–4 meters long and made from wood and sturdy reeds. In deeper water an oar known as a gharrafa (غرافة) is also used. However, many larger and more modern mashoof are also outfitted with an outboard motor.

Mashoofs vary widely in size, and Marsh Arabs have specific terms for the different sizes of mashoofs. A mataur is a small mashoof that can only fit one person (similar to a kayak) and is used for hunting fowl. Larger mashoofs are called burkasha or dānik (الدانك) and are used for transporting larger amounts of reeds and goods or carrying important sheikhs. Still larger mashoofs, called giood or anya, are used for navigating large waterways like the Tigris and Euphrates and Shatt al-Arab. Giood often have sails, a ship's wheel, and a raised prow and stern and must be crewed by professional sailors. An average modern mashoof is around 4 feet (1.2 m) wide and 19 feet (5.8 m) long.

== See also ==
- Gondola
- Tarada
