= Shakir Mustafa Salim =

S. M. Salim
- Born: 1919
- Died: 1985 (aged 65–66)
- Education: University College, London
- Known for: Marsh Dwellers of the Euphrates Delta (1962)
- Scientific career
- Fields: Social anthropology
- Workplaces: Baghdad University

Shakir Mustafa Salim (1919–1985) was an Iraqi social anthropologist who taught in the Department of Sociology at Baghdad University.

He compiled A Dictionary of Anthropology: English-Arabic (1981).

== Marsh Dwellers of the Euphrates Delta ==
Salim is best known for his groundbreaking ethnographic work, Marsh Dwellers of the Euphrates Delta, submitted as his doctoral thesis in University College, London (1955), first published in Arabic in Baghdad in two volumes (1956-1957), and subsequently published in English as number 23 in the series London School of Economics Monographs on Social Anthropology (London: Athlone Press, 1962). This was an anthropological report on a year spent among the Marsh Arabs of Al-Chibayish, Iraq, in 1953.

The work was reviewed by:

- Edith Penrose in Bulletin of the School of Oriental and African Studies 25:1/3 (1962), pp. 611–612.
- Victor Ayoub in American Sociological Review 28:5 (1963), pp. 866–867.
- Robert Cresswell in Études rurales 11 (1963), pp. 111–113.
- W. E. Willmott in Canadian Journal of Economics and Political Science 29:2 (1963), pp. 261–263.
- E. L. Peters in Man 65 (1965), pp. 94–95.
- Malcolm Quint in Middle East Journal 17:1/2 (1963), pp. 172–173.
- A. S. Tritton in Journal of the Royal Asiatic Society of Great Britain and Ireland, No. 1/2 (Apr., 1963), pp. 91–92.
- Peter Lienhardt in American Anthropologist, New Series 66:1 (1964), pp. 164–166.
- Maxime Rodinson in L'Homme 5:1 (1965), pp. 127–132.
