= Al-Daraji =

Arab tribe

ٱلْدَرّاجي
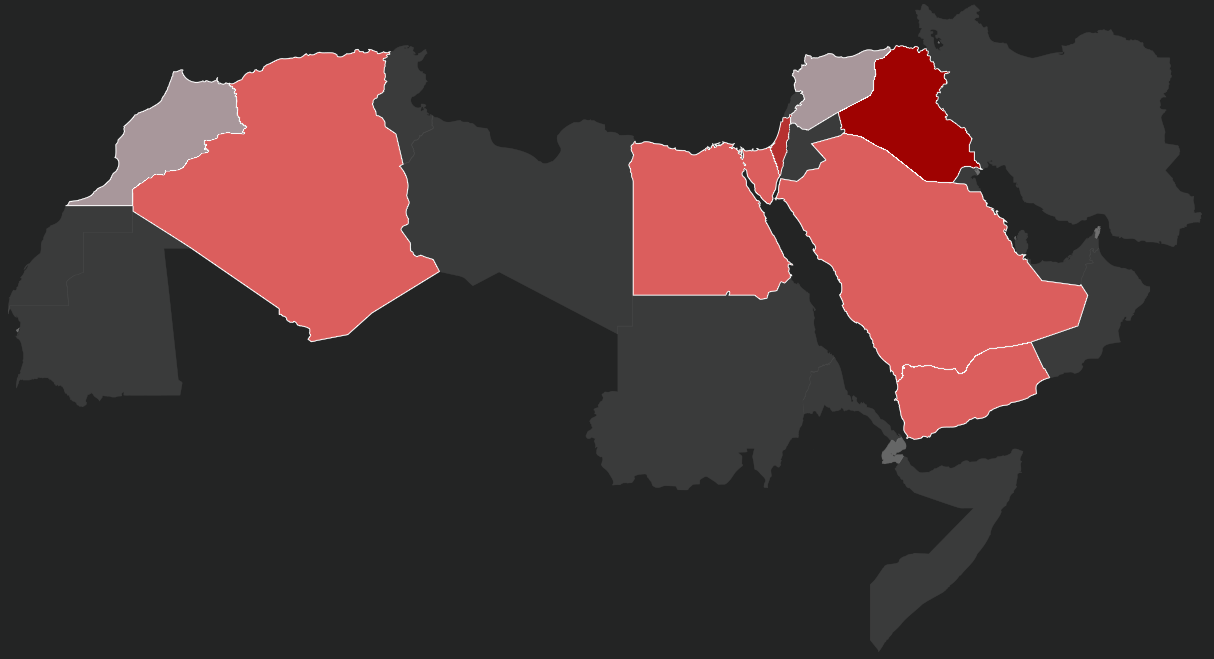
- A choropleth map highlighting the diaspora of the Al-Daraji people

Regions with significant populations
- Iraq: majority
- Palestine: moderate amount
- Yemen, Syria‌, Saudi Arabia, and Northern Africa: small groups

Languages
- Arabic

Religion
- Islam (Sunni and Shi'a)

Related ethnic groups
- Other Muslims within the region: (Afro-Arabs; Turkmen; Bedouin; Circassians; Kurds; Ahwazi)

Al-Daraji or Al-Bu Daraj, alternatively spelled Al-Duraji or Al-Bu Duraj, (/ʌl-budˈrɑːdʒ/, /ʌldˈrɑːdʒiː/); Arabic: ٱلْدَرّاجي ,ٱلْبو دَرّاجٚ; is an Arab tribe and one of the tribes of Arabia. Its tribesmen are mainly located in Iraq, Smaller groups are also situated in Yemen, Syria, and other areas in the Middle East. The Al-Daraji are mentioned in the book Marsh Arabs, by Sir Wilfred Patrick Thesiger (1964).

== Religion ==
The Al-Daraji tribe includes Shia and Sunni Muslims, the tribe's religious makeup varies by location:

- In predominantly Shia areas like Baghdad and Basra, Al-Daraji members are mostly Shia.

This showcases the tribe's adaptability to the religious demographics of different areas. However, this sectarian-unity is not just unique to the Al-Daraji tribe; other prominent tribes such as the Shia Banu Qushayr and Sunni Banu Uqayl branches of the Banu Ka'b and the Shammar clan with its Sunni Al-Jarba and Shia Al-Toga branches also show a similar split.

This variation in religious affiliation among the Al-Daraji tribe's members showcases the complex interplay between tribal identity and religious beliefs in Arabia. It also highlights the tribe's ability to integrate and coexist within the diverse religious contexts of Iraq and beyond. Despite these religious differences, there is evidence to suggest that sectarianism has not significantly impacted the internal relations within the Al-Daraji tribe. This phenomenon indicates a level of inter-sect cohesion and mutual respect among its members, which may be attributed to shared tribal affiliations and cultural bonds that transcend sectarian lines. Such dynamics are indicative of the complex interplay between tribal identity and religious affiliation in the Middle East, particularly within multi-ethnic and multi-religious societies like Iraq.

The Al-Daraji tribe's approach to managing religious diversity within its ranks offers an interesting case study in the broader context of tribal dynamics in the Middle East. It reflects the potential for tribal and familial ties to serve as a unifying force in regions often characterized by religious and sectarian divisions.

== History ==
Al-Daraji originated from the lineage of Rabi'a ibn Nizar and is believed to have started in the region of Najd. There were a few houses under Al-Daraji, with the main house being Faraj bin Abdullah bin Darraj bin Sarhid bin Salman bin Aadhar bin Jaza bin Daraj, where the etymology of the tribe originated from Rabi'a ibn Nizar's father – Daraj. They are not be confused with the Darraji tribe of Samarra, which is a Husayni Sayyid clan. The two are completely unrelated.

Darraj, born between 1290 and 1294 AD, founded the lineage known as Al-Daraji. Departing from its ancestral clan, Al-Daraji joined the broader Al-Muntafiq state. With oversight from Al-Muntafiq, the tribe thrived until 1515 AD, during the reign of Sheikh Hassan bin Mani', who allocated the Kumit lands exclusively to the Budraj clan, then under Faraj bin Tufan bin Sarhid.

Faraj's death in 1533 left behind a legacy through his sons, Jabr, Kulaib, and Kamr, who further propagated the tribe's lineage and influence. Jabr bin Faraj birthed the progenitors of the Albu Khudair clans, reinforcing the tribe's stature and societal contributions. Tracing its ancestry, the Al-Daraji clan boasts a lineage leading back to Farah bin Hufan bin Sarhid bin Salman bin Aadhar bin Jaza bin Darraj, connecting to the broader genealogical tree of Banu Rabia and ultimately to Adnan.

Al-Daraji migrated to Iraq in the 13th century, settling in the southern part of the country near the Euphrates River. The tribe became known for its agriculture and livestock industries. Al-Daraji played a significant role in the history of Iraq. In the 16th century, the tribe led a rebellion against the Ottoman Empire, although this rebellion was ultimately unsuccessful. A few years later however, the Iraqi Revolt against the British Empire, led by the late Grand Sheikh Mohamed Al-Duraji along with many other tribesmen, culminated in a victory for the Iraqis against the British occupation.
