= Sigrid Westphal-Hellbusch =

- Born: June 10, 1915; Rendsburg, German Empire
- Died: February 1, 1984 (aged 68); Oldenburg, West Germany
- Education: Humboldt University of Berlin
- Occupations: Anthropologist, ethnologist
- Employer(s): Humboldt University of Berlin; Free University of Berlin; Ethnological Museum of Berlin
- Spouse: Heinz Westphal

Sigrid Westphal-Hellbusch (10 June 1915 – 1 February 1984) was a German anthropologist, ethnologist and a professor. She travelled through many countries for research and was married to Heinz Westphal.

== Personal life ==
She was born in Rendsburg. She was the daughter of engineer Ludwig Hellbusch and Erna Martha Anna Philippi. She spent her childhood in Berlin and finished school there in 1934. She had no children.

== Career ==
In 1935/36, she began her studies in Ethnology, Anthropology, Geography, and Psychology in Berlin. Some of her teachers were Richard Thurnwald, Diedrich Westermann, and Eugen Fischer. She completed her PhD in 1940 with a thesis on the meaning of hunting for Native Australians. She worked as a volunteer at the Ethnological Museum (Staatliches Museum für Völkerkunde), and then worked as a scientific assistant at the department for the Southern Pacific region in 1940.

Due to World War II, she had to perform a wide range of tasks at the museum. She also began to work on her habilitation thesis. She secured objects of the museum during the bombing. In early 1945, she moved with her parents to Oldenburg after her contract with the museum finished. A year later, she returned to Berlin.

She completed her habilitation thesis on totemism in Australia in 1946. The next year, she started to lecture at the Humboldt University in East Berlin. She chaired the newly founded Institute for Ethnology at Humboldt University from 1952 onward. Westphal-Hellbusch left the Humboldt University in 1953 and took an assistant position at Thurnwald's Institute. She also lectured at the Faculty of Philosophy of the Free University. She became an associate professor in 1957 and became a professor of ethnology in 1964.

She was married to Heinz Westphal. Together, the couple did several field studies from the mid-fifties onwards. The couple travelled through southern Iraq during 1955 and 1956.

She conducted research in Turkey (1958, 1966, 1971), Morocco (1959), Iran (1972), Afghanistan, India, and Egypt. She left the institute due to the conflicts arising from the 1968 student movement in 1970. She began to work at the Ethnological Museum the same year. She chaired the newly founded Department for Western and Middle Asia.

She retired in 1976 and spent the last years of her life with her husband in Oldenburg; she died in Oldenburg in 1984.

== Works ==
- The Jat of Pakistan (1964)
- Zur Geschichte und Kultur der Jat (1968)
- Hinduistische Viehzüchter im nord-westlichen Indien (1974)
- Mützen aus Zentralasien und Persien (1976)
- The Jat of Pakistan (1986)
