= 'Imran ibn Shahin =

10th-century founder of a Batihah marshlands state

'Imran ibn Shahin (Arabic: عمران بن شاهين) (died 979) was a Nabataean and the founder of a state in the Batihah marshlands in the 10th century. His reign was marked by decades of struggle against the Buyids of Iraq.

== Life ==
'Imran created the marsh state during the period of the declining authority of the Caliphate. Having committed a crime in Jamidah, 'Imran fled to the neighboring swamps to avoid punishment by the local government. From there he managed to gain the cooperation of fellow criminals and local fisherman, and was able to set up a robber state, defying government authority. He managed to expand his power when the Biridis of Basra charged him with the protection of Jamidah and the parts of Ahvaz lying within the Batihah. With more followers flocking to him, 'Imran was eventually able to take control of the whole swamp.

The Buyids' entrance into Baghdad in 945 meant that conflict between the two sides was inevitable. The Buyid amir Mu'izz al-Daula sent his deputy Abu Ja'far al-Saymari to subdue the Batihah. He managed to inflict a series of defeats upon 'Imran, who fled and whose family was imprisoned. The death of Mu'izz's overlord 'Imad al-Daula in late 949, however, forced Mu'izz to send al-Saymari to Fars in order to secure the succession of 'Imad's son 'Adud al-Daula, giving 'Imran the opportunity to recover his authority.

Shortly afterwards, Mu'izz al-Daula sent another expedition against the Batihah. This campaign, led by a Daylamite officer named Ruzbahan, ended badly. Ruzbahan discovered 'Imran's location and attacked him, but was heavily defeated and forced to withdraw.

'Imran then became even more bold, with his subjects demanding protection money from anyone, including government officials, that crossed their path, and the path to Basra by water was effectively closed off. Mu'izz al-Daula, after receiving numerous complaints from his officers, sent another army in 950 or 951, under the joint command of Ruzbahan and the amir's vizier al-Muhallabi.

Ruzbahan, who disliked the vizier, convinced him to directly attack 'Imran. He kept his forces in the rear and fled as soon as fighting between the two sides began. 'Imran used the terrain effectively, laying ambushes and confusing al-Muhallabi's army. Many of the vizier's soldiers died in the fighting and he himself only narrowly escaped capture, swimming to safety. Mu'izz al-Daula then came to terms with 'Imran, acceding to his terms. Prisoners were exchanged and 'Imran was made a vassal of the Buyids, being instated as governor of the Batihah.

Peace lasted for approximately five years between the two sides. A false rumor of Mu'izz al-Daula's death in 955, however, prompted 'Imran to seize a Buyid convoy traveling from Ahvaz to Baghdad. Mu'izz demanded that the items confiscated be returned, at which point 'Imran returned the money gained, but kept the goods taken. The Buyid sent Ruzbahan a third time to the swamp, but the latter revolted and 'Imran was spared from a new attack. He remained secure for twelve years; only in 967 was another campaign launched against him. Mu'izz al-Daula oversaw the expedition himself, but he became sick and ultimately died, preventing any progress from being made. His son and successor, 'Izz al-Daula, quickly sent the Turkish general Sebük-Tegin to make peace with him.

War between the two sides resumed in the summer 971, when 'Izz al-Daula's vizier Abu'l-Fadl suggested carrying out an attack against the Batihah in an effort to plunder the robber-state and relieve the Buyids' financial troubles. He dammed all the waterways leading into the marshes in order to destroy 'Imran's advantage, and built a dyke that allowed his troops to march up to 'Imram's capital fortress. 'Imran, however, sent his men out when the waters rose to destroy the dams, and if they could not do that he would simply move himself to another location in the marshes. As a result of the slow progress of the campaign, the Buyid troops lost morale and became mutinous. This, coupled with an invasion by the Byzantine Empire, forced 'Izz al-Daula to make peace with 'Imran. The latter greatly benefited from the terms, without any obligation for tribute.

Internal struggles within the Buyid state enabled 'Imran to enhance his position. Having lost control of northern Iraq to the Turks, 'Izz al-Daula in 974 requested 'Imran's help. He sent him robes of honor, with a title Mu'in al-Daula and asked for military support, as well as his daughter's hand in marriage. 'Imran refused both proposals.

In 975 'Adud al-Daula, who had come from Fars to help 'Izz al-Daula, ended up taking power for himself. 'Imran requested and received from him a formal grant for the rule of the Batihah. When 'Izz al-Daula's vizier, Ibn Baqiyya, revolted against 'Adud, 'Imran gave support to him. 'Izz temporarily regained control of Iraq, and continued to seek 'Imran's help, but to no avail. 'Adud al-Daula defeated his cousin and took over the region for good in 977, and 'Imran maintained peace with him.

'Imran died in the summer of 979 and was succeeded by his son Hasan.

== See also ==
- Batihah
- Buyids
