= Al-Gharraf River =

Gharraf Canal Shaṭṭ al-Ḥayy, Shaṭṭ al-Gharrāf, Hai River
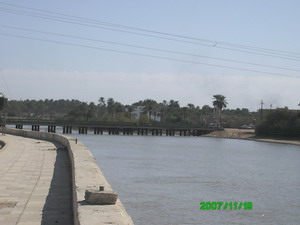
- Bridge over the Gharraf Canal at Qalat Sukkar
- Native name: شط الحيّ (Arabic)

Location
- Country: Iraq
- Governorate: Al-Qadisiyyah

Physical characteristics
- Source: Tigris River
  - location: Near Kut
  - coordinates: 32.425°N 45.85°E
- Mouth: Euphrates River
  - location: Near Nasiriyah

Basin features
- River system: Tigris-Euphrates
- Bridges: Bridge over the Gharraf Canal at Qalat Sukkar

The Gharraf Canal, Shaṭṭ al-Ḥayy (Arabic: شط الحيّ), also known as Shaṭṭ al-Gharrāf (Arabic: شط الغرّاف) or the Hai river, is an ancient canal in Iraq that connects the Tigris at Kut al Amara with the Euphrates east of Nasiriyah. As an Ottoman (Turkish) position lay along the canal, it was one of the objectives of intense military action during the First World War, especially the siege of Kut (December 1915 to April 1916).

Between 1934 and 1939, the Kut Barrage was constructed in the Tigris to control the water level of the river and to provide a constant inflow of water to the Shatt al-Hayy.

== First World War ==
The Turks surrounded and besieged General Charles Townshend's British Empire forces which occupied Kut. The Gharraf River was picked by the Ottoman Army as an advantage point as part of that siege. During the siege the Ottomans repelled relief attempts by Anglo-Indian forces in the Battle of Hanna in January 1916 and the Battle of Dujaila in March. One of the reasons the British had decided to defend Kut was that the canal was considered as a possible route for the Turks or the Anglo-Indian Force to transport troops between the Tigris and Euphrates and vice versa. By 20 May 1916 the British occupied the right (south) bank of the Tigris as far west as the Gharraf, clearing it of Turkish forces, but had not yet recaptured Kut. They were able to cross to the other side on 13 December 1916. The Turks evacuated Kut on 24 February 1917 and retreated to Baghdad.
