= Batihah =

The Batihah (Arabic: البطيحة) was a geographical and political unit in Iraq in the 10th and 11th centuries. It was also known as The Great Swamp or The Marsh.

== Geographical description ==
The Batihah was an area in which, at the time, both the Tigris and the Euphrates discharged their waters. In its broadest sense, it covered an area approximately fifty miles across and almost two hundred miles in length, lying between Wasit and Basra.

The Batihah was a marshland. It was composed of many reeds, which in certain areas gave way to open lagoons. The reeds made the marsh very difficult for enemies to travel through; only small boats that were driven by poles could navigate the area. Because of this, the Batihah was almost invulnerable to attack and its inhabitants were able to maintain their independence for the better part of a century.

== History of the Great Swamp ==
=== 'Imran ===
The Batihah state was founded by a criminal named 'Imran ibn Shahin. He took advantage of the declining authority of the Abbasid Caliphate to establish a state in the marshlands. He steadily expanded his power by drawing other criminals and local fishermen to his side. From 945 onwards the Buyids were established in Baghdad, and thereafter attempted to take over the Batihah. 'Imran successfully resisted the Buyids for several decades, and proved to be a thorn in the side of the Buyid state. He and his successors were titled amirs, and were recognized by the Buyids as the legitimate rulers of the Batihah.

=== 'Imran's successors ===
'Imran died in the summer of 979, and was succeeded by his son Hasan. The Buyid amir 'Adud al-Dawla decided to use this as an opportunity to subjugate the Batihah. The army was commanded by the amir's vizier, Mutahhar. He attempted to dam the waterways, and create a raised road to allow his troops to approach Hasan's fortress on foot. The campaign cost a large amount of money, and it effectively stopped any trade boats from travelling the Tigris. Hasan, like his father, managed to stop Mutahhar by breaching the dams. The vizier tried to draw him out into open battle, but was unsuccessful. His failure in the campaign, as well as his fear of 'Adud al-Dawla's wrath, eventually caused Mutahhar to commit suicide. 'Adud therefore called for an end to fighting, and all he gained was a money payment from Hasan.

Shortly after this, Hasan's brother Muhammad succeeded him. In 983 or 984, Muhammad was killed, bringing an end to the power of 'Imran's family. The man responsible for his murder, the chamberlain Muzaffar ibn 'Ali, then assumed power. He died in 986 and was succeeded by his sister's son Abu 'l-Hasan 'Ali ibn Nasr. During this time, the Batihah rulers maintained good relations with the Buyids; neither 'Adud al-Dawla or his successor Samsam al-Dawla (983) launched any further expeditions against the swamp.

=== Muhadhdhib al-Dawla ===
Abu'l-Hasan kept the relations with the Buyids on good terms. During his reign, the Batihah again became a refuge for criminals and political refugees, including the caliph al-Qadir (r. 991–1031). Sharaf al-Dawla, who had seized Iraq from Samsam al-Dawla in 987, conferred on Abu 'l-Hasan the honorific title (laqab) of Muhadhdhib al-Dawla.

Sharaf's death in 988 or 989 threw the Buyid state into chaos. The new Buyid amir, Baha' al-Dawla, in his struggles with Samsam al-Dawla, asked Muhadhdhib al-Dawla for loans several times, and also created arranged for an alliance through marriage between the two sides. At one point, he even gave the Batihah ruler control of Lower Wasit, in exchange for an annual tribute of 1.3 million dirhams. As a result of the fighting, one of 'Izz al-Dawla's sons, Abu Nasr, ended up taking refuge in the Batihah.

In 1003 or 1004, Muhadhdhib al-Dawla sent a soldier of fortune named Abu 'l-'Abbas ibn Wasil to wrest Basra from Lashkaristan, who after taking the city had refused to recognize Baha' al-Dawla as his sole overlord. Abu 'l-'Abbas completed his task successfully, but then marched back and conquered the Batihah. Muhadhdhib al-Dawla was forced to flee to Baghdad, and only after Baha' al-Dawla sent several expeditions in support of him was he able to return to the swamp (in 1006 or 1007).

Baha' al-Dawla died in 1012 and was succeeded by Sultan al-Dawla. In around 1017, the Buyid ruler of Kerman, Abu'l-Fawaris, entered into a struggle with Sultan and asked Muhadhdhib al-Dawla for assistance. Around the same time (1017 or 1018), Muhadhdhib al-Dawla died.

=== End of the Batihah state ===
Muhadhdhib al-Dawla was succeeded by al-Sharabi. Soon afterwards, the military junta that effectively controlled Sultan al-Dawla's government demanded that al-Sharabi turn over Ibn Sahlan, a former Buyid governor of Iraq who had fled to the Batihah. Al-Sharabi, keeping in mind the Batihah's tradition of not turning over fugitives, refused, whereupon the junta convinced Sultan al-Dawla to send an expedition to the swamp. Al-Sharabi was captured and the Batihah was finally conquered by the Buyids, bringing an end to the state.
