= Marsh Arabs =

Indigenous people of southern Iraq

Marsh Arabs ʻArab al-Ahwār عرب الأهوار
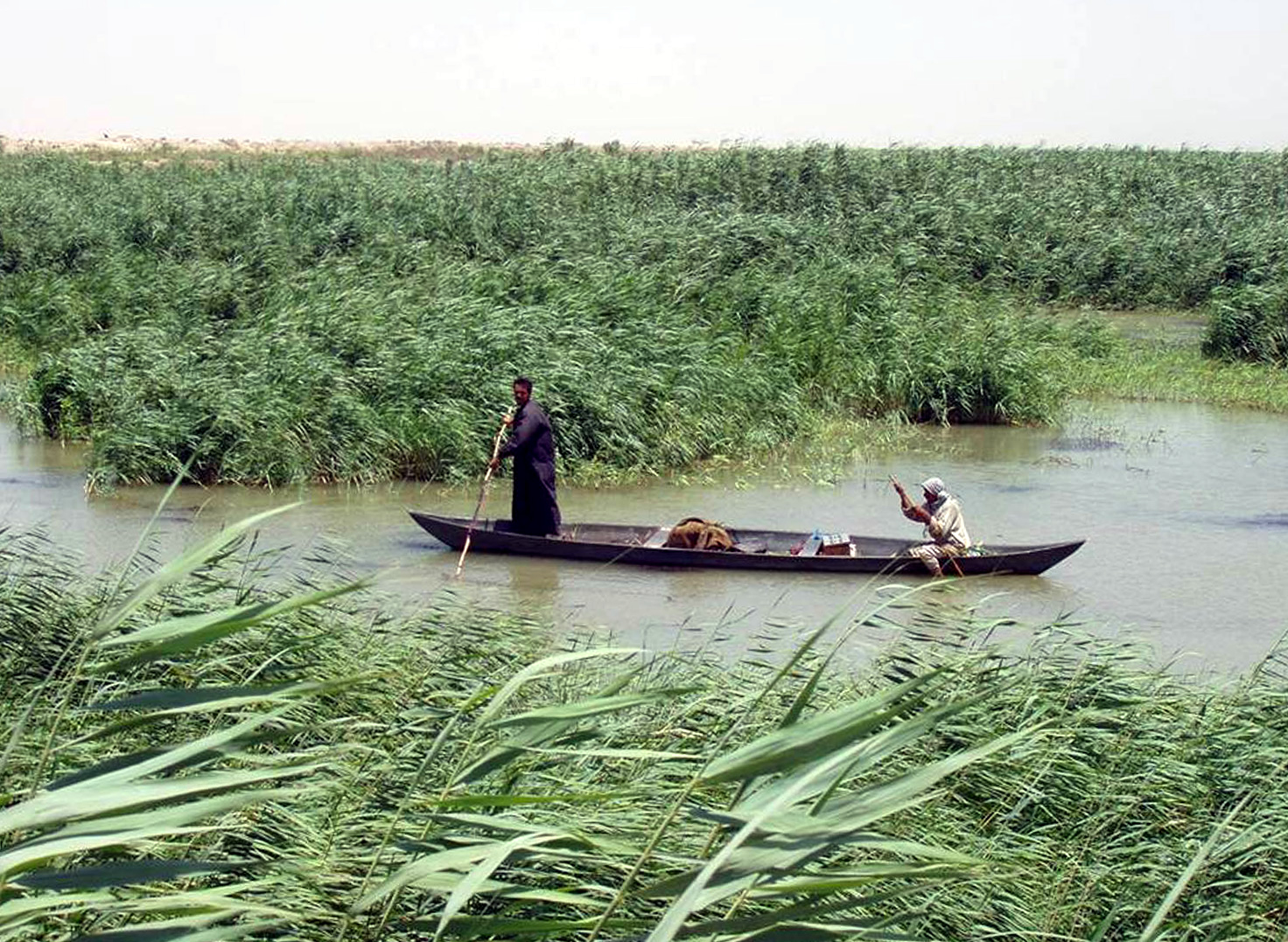
- Marsh Arabs on a boat.

Total population
- 6 to 8 million descendants (based on population in 1950)

Regions with significant populations
- Iraq: 85,000 (6 million descendants in Governorate of Meysan, Basra and Dhi Qar regions of Mesopotamian Marsh)
- Iran: 120,000 (1.6 million with descendants in Khuzestani Marshland and Iraqi refugees)

Languages
- South Mesopotamian Arabic

Religion
- Predominantly Twelver Shia Islam

Related ethnic groups
- Mandaeans, Iraqi Bedouins, other Iraqi Arabs

The Marsh Arabs (Arabic: عرب الأهوار ʻArab al-Ahwār "Arabs of the Marshlands"), also referred to as Ahwaris, the Maʻdān (Arabic: معدان "dweller in the plains") or Shroog (Mesopotamian Arabic: شروگ "those from the east")—the latter two often considered derogatory in the present day—are inhabitants of the Mesopotamian marshlands in the modern-day south Iraq, as well as in the Hawizeh Marshes straddling the Iran–Iraq border.

Comprising members of many different tribes and tribal confederations, such as the Āl Bū Muḥammad, Ferayghāt, Shaghanbah, Ahwaris had developed a culture centered on the marshes' natural resources. Many of the marshes' inhabitants were forcibly displaced during the Draining of the Mesopotamian Marshes during and after the 1991 uprisings in Iraq. The draining of the marshes caused a significant decline in bioproductivity; following the 2003 invasion of Iraq and the overthrow of the Saddam Hussein regime, water flow to the marshes was restored and the ecosystem has begun to recover.

== History ==
=== Origin theories ===
The origins of the Ahwari people are still a matter of some dispute. British colonial ethnographers found it difficult to classify some of Ahwaris' social customs and speculated that they might have originated in Indus Valley . They may have descended from the Zuṭṭ (Jat) people, who moved to the region of lower Iraq in the 8th and 9th centuries and followed similar customs and traditions.

Some scholars such as Ali al-Wardi have claimed they are descended from the Nabataeans of Iraq, the Aramaic-speaking people who inhabited Lower Mesopotamia in the Middle Ages, and some of their clans even follow their ancestry to Islamized Mandaeans.

Other scholars have proposed historical and genetic links between the Marsh Arabs and the ancient Sumerians due to shared agricultural practices, methods of house-building and location. There is, however, no written record of the marsh tribes until the ninth century and the Sumerians lost their distinct ethnic identity by around 1800 BCE, some 2700 years before. Links to Sumerian genetics can be traced back to the Arabization and assimilation of indigenous Mesopotamians.

Others have noted that much of the culture of Ahwaris is shared with the desert bedouin who came to the area after the fall of the Abbasid Caliphate. However, they also absorbed an Iranian element, with clans such as Al-Bu Muhammad historically intermingling with Persians and even reportedly having Persian or Indian origin. Marsh Arabs were historically stigmatized by neighboring Arab tribes for the apparent Iranian connection.

=== 1991–2003 ===
The marshes had for some time been considered a refuge for elements persecuted by the government of Saddam Hussein, as in past centuries they had been a refuge for escaped slaves and serfs, such as during the Zanj Rebellion. By the mid-1980s, a low-level insurgency against Ba'athist drainage and resettlement projects had developed in the area, led by Sheik Abdul Kerim Mahud al-Muhammadawi of the Al bu Muhammad under the nom de guerre Abu Hatim.

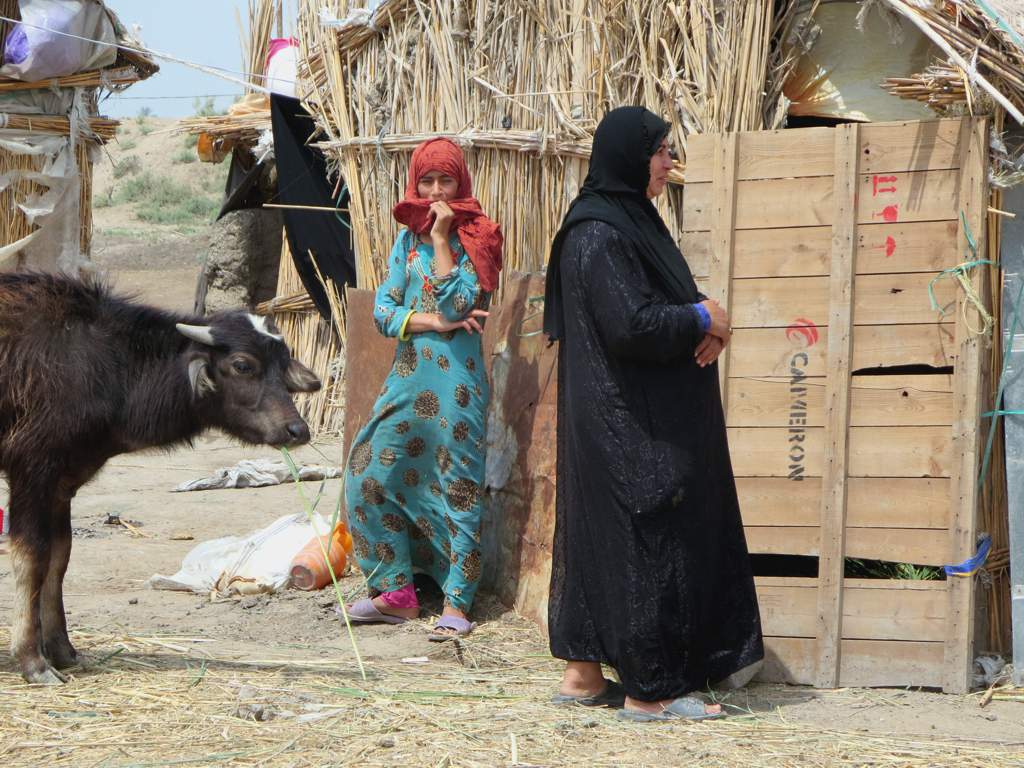
The Marsh Arabs of Iraq keep water buffalo for their milk

During the 1970s, the expansion of irrigation projects had begun to disrupt the flow of water to the marshes. However, after the First Gulf War (1991), the Iraqi government aggressively revived a program to divert the flow of the Tigris River and the Euphrates River away from the marshes in retribution for a failed Shia uprising. This was done primarily to eliminate the food sources of the Marsh Arabs and to prevent any remaining militiamen from taking refuge in the marshes, the Badr Brigades and other militias having used them as cover. The plan, which was accompanied by a series of propaganda articles by the Iraqi regime directed against the Ma'dan, systematically converted the wetlands into a desert, forcing the residents out of their settlements in the region. Villages in the marshes were attacked and burnt down and there were reports of the water being deliberately poisoned.

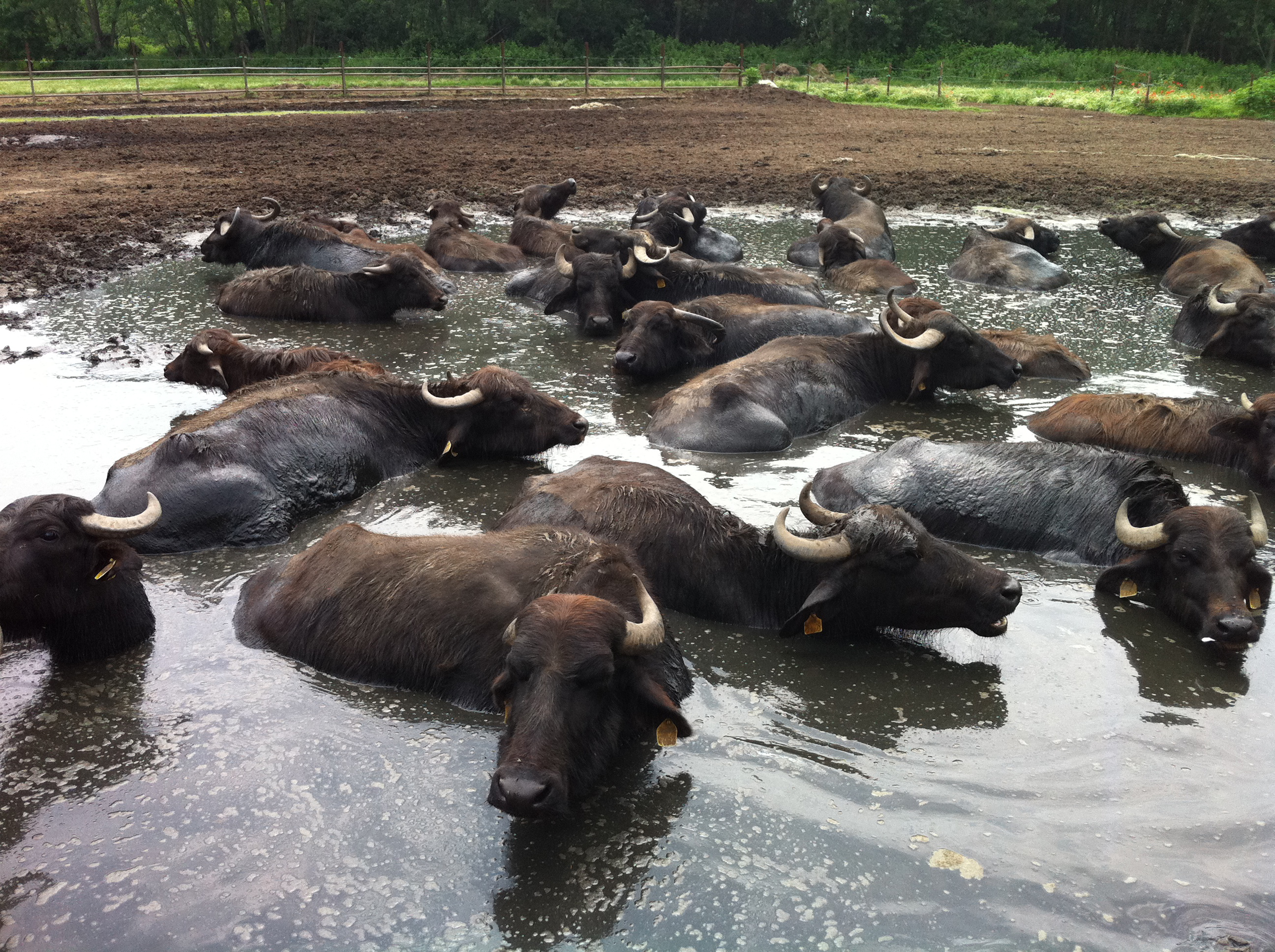
Water buffalos are found in the marshes. The seal of a scribe employed by an Akkadian king shows the sacrifice of water buffaloes.

The majority of Ahwaris were displaced either to areas adjacent to the drained marshes, abandoning their traditional lifestyle in favour of conventional agriculture, to towns and camps in other areas of Iraq or to Iranian refugee camps. Only 1,600 of them were estimated to still be living on traditional dibins by 2003. The western Hammar Marshes and the Qurnah or Central Marshes had become completely desiccated, while the eastern Hawizeh Marshes had dramatically shrunk. The Marsh Arabs, who numbered about half a million in the 1950s, have dwindled to as few as 20,000 in Iraq, according to the United Nations. As of 2003, an estimated 80,000 to 120,000 have fled to refugee camps in Iran. However, following the Multi-National Force overthrow of the Saddam Hussein regime, water flow to the marshes was restored and the ecosystem has begun to recover, and many have returned to their native lands.

The Observer's Middle East correspondent Shyam Bhatia who spent two weeks with the Marsh Arabs in 1993 wrote the first eyewitness account of Iraqi army tactics at the time of draining the marshes, bombing Marsh villages and then sowing mines in the water before retreating. Bhatia's extensive reportage won him the title of International Reporter of the Year, although exclusive film footage of the time he spent in the area has never been screened.

=== Since 2003 ===
With the breaching of dikes by local communities subsequent to the 2003 invasion of Iraq and the ending of a four-year drought that same year, the process has been reversed and the marshes have experienced a substantial rate of recovery. The permanent wetlands now cover more than 50% of 1970s levels, with a remarkable regrowth of the Hammar and Hawizeh Marshes and some recovery of the Central Marshes. Efforts to restore the marshes have led to signs of their gradual revivification as water is restored to the former desert, but the whole ecosystem may take far longer to restore than it took to destroy. Only a few thousand of the nearly half million Marsh Arabs remain in the area in Maysan Governorate, Dhi Qar Governorate and Basra Governorate. Most of the rest that can be accounted for are refugees living in other Shi'i areas in Iraq, or have emigrated to Iran, and many do not wish to return to their former home and lifestyle, which despite its independence was characterised by extreme poverty and hardship. A report by the United States Agency for International Development noted that while some Ahwaris had chosen to return to their traditional activities in the marshes, especially the Hammar Marshes, within a short time of reflooding, they were without clean drinking water, sanitation, health care or education facilities. In addition, it is still uncertain if the marshes will completely recover, given increased levels of water extraction from the Tigris and Euphrates.

Many of the resettled Marsh Arabs have gained representation through the Hezbollah Movement in Iraq; others have become followers of Muqtada al-Sadr's movement, through which they gained political control of Maysan Governorate. Political instability and local feuds, aggravated by the poverty of the dispossessed Marsh Arab population, remain a serious problem. Rory Stewart observed that throughout history, Ahwaris were the pawn of many rulers and became expert dissimulators. The tribal chiefs are outwardly submissive and work with the coalition and Iraqi officials. Behind the scenes, the tribes engage in smuggling and other activities.

== Culture ==
The term Maʻdān was used disparagingly by desert tribes to refer to those inhabiting the Iraqi river basins, as well as by those who farmed in the river basins to refer to the population of the marshes.

Ahwaris speak South Mesopotamian Arabic and traditionally wore a variant of normal Arab dress: for males, a thawb ("long shirt"; in recent times, occasionally with a Western-style jacket over the top) and a keffiyeh ("headcloth") worn twisted around the head in a turban, as few could afford an ʻiqāl.

=== Agriculture ===
The society of the Marsh Arabs was divided into two main groups by occupation. One group bred and raised water buffaloes while others cultivated crops such as rice, barley, wheat and pearl millet; they also kept some sheep and cattle. Rice cultivation was especially important; it was carried out in small plots cleared in April and sown in mid-May. Cultivation seasons were marked by the rising and setting of certain stars, such as the Pleiades and Sirius.

Some Ahwari branches were nomadic pastoralists, erecting temporary dwellings and moving buffaloes around the marshes according to the season. Some fishing, especially of species of barbel (notably the binni or bunni, Mesopotamichthys sharpeyi), was practised using spears and datura poison, but large-scale fishing using nets was until recent times regarded as a dishonourable profession by Ahwaris and was mostly carried out by a separate low-status tribe known as the Berbera. By the early 1990s, however, up to 60% of the total amount of fish caught in Iraq's inland waters came from the marshes.

In the later twentieth century, a third main occupation entered Marsh Arab life; the weaving of reed mats on a commercial scale. Though they often earned far more than workers in agriculture, weavers were looked down upon by both Ahwaris and farmers alike: however, financial concerns meant that it gradually gained acceptance as a respectable profession.

=== Gender ===
Recording of Massoud El Amaratly

Multiplicity in gender identity was recorded by Wilfred Thesiger during his time with the Ahwari people in the 1950s. In The Marsh Arabs he records how there were people called mustarjil who were assigned female at birth, but later decided to live their lives as men. He also described people born as men who lived their lives as women, accepted by the Ahwari community completely. The most famous of the mustarjil was folk singer Masoud El Amaratly, who found fame in the 1920s. Anthropologists Sigrid Westphal-Hellbusch and Heinz Westphal made similar observations to Thesiger.

=== Religion ===
The majority of Marsh Arabs are Twelver Shiʿi Muslims, though in the marshes small communities of Mandaic-speaking Mandaeans (often working as boat builders and craftsmen) live alongside them and they number a couple hundred. The inhabitants' have a long association with Arab tribes within Persia. Wilfred Thesiger mentioned that the Marsh Arabs who had performed the Hajj and those of them had visited Mashhad (thereby earning the title Zair) were considered highly respected within the community. A number of families also claimed descent from Muhammad, adopting the title of sayyid.

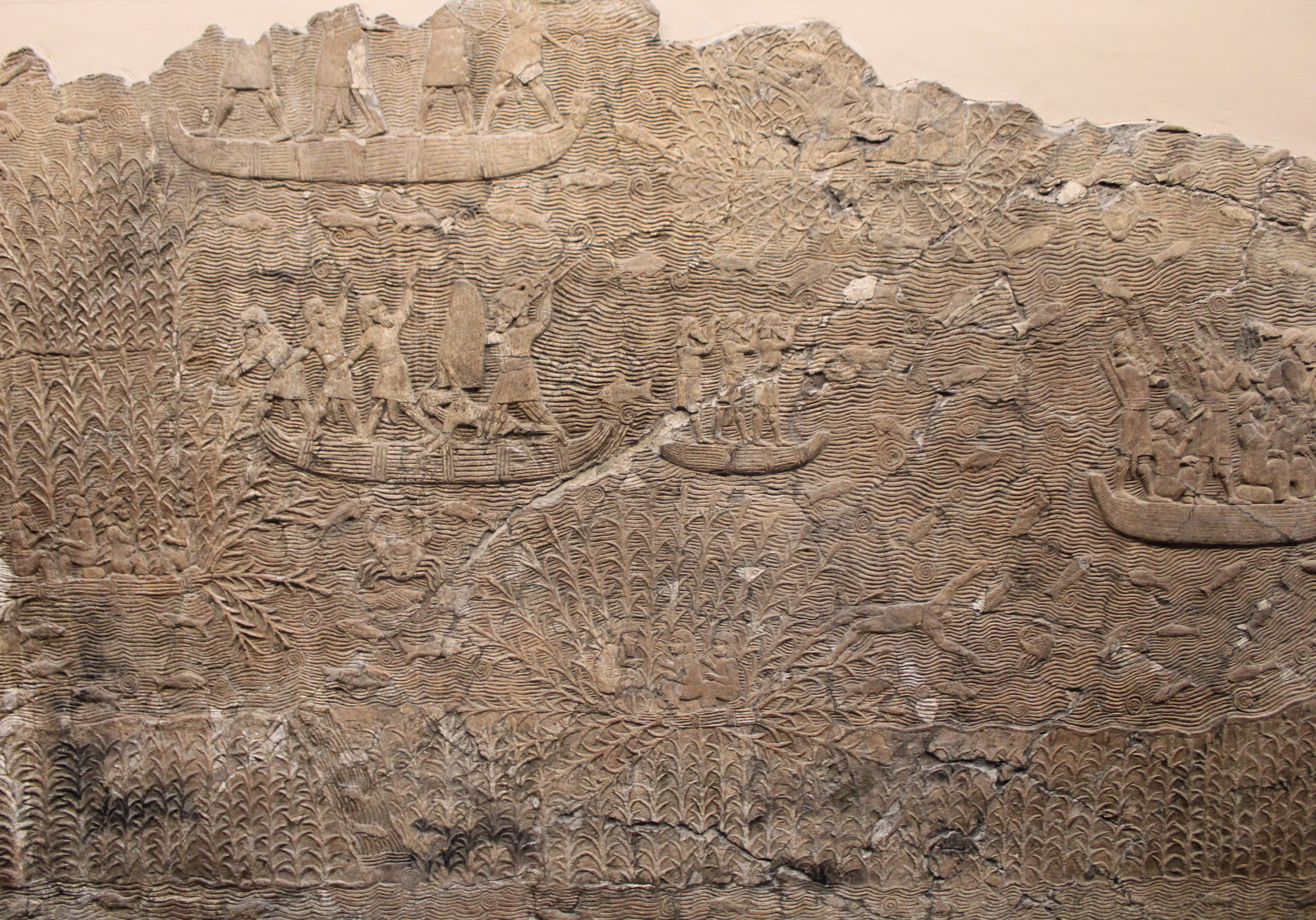
Campaign of Ashurbanipal in The Marshlands.

Ahwaris carried out the majority of their devotions in private as there were no places of worship within the Marshes; some were known to visit Ezra's Tomb, one of the few religious sites of any kind in the area.

=== Society ===
As with most tribes of southern Iraq, the main authority was the tribal shaikh. To this day, the shaikh of a Marsh Arab group will collect a tribute from his tribe in order to maintain the mudhif, the tribal guesthouse, which acts as the political, social, judicial and religious centre of Marsh Arabic life. The mudhif is used as a place to settle disputes, to carry out diplomacy with other tribes and as a gathering point for religious and other celebrations. It is also the place where visitors are offered hospitality. Although the tribal shaykh was the principal figure, each Ahwari village (which may have contained members of several different tribes) would also follow the authority of the hereditary qalit "headman" of a tribe's particular section.

Blood feuds, which could only be settled by the qalit, were a feature of Marsh Arab life, in common with that of the Arab bedouin. Many of the Marsh Arabs' codes of behaviour were similar to those of the desert tribes.

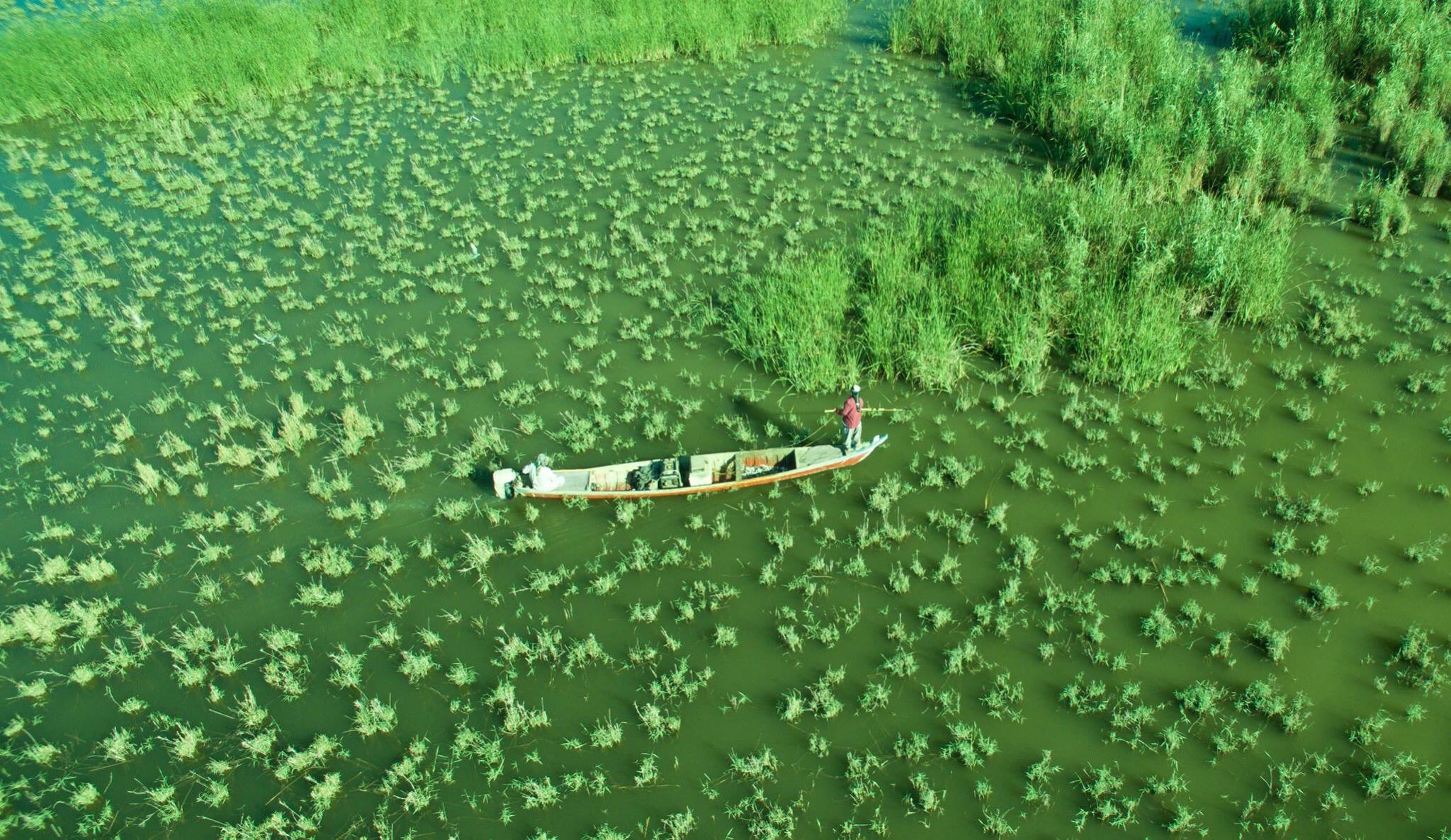
Marsh Arab poling a mashoof

Most Marsh Arabs lived in arched reed houses considerably smaller than a mudhif. The typical dwelling was usually a little more than two meters wide, about six meters long, and a little less than three meters high, and was either constructed at the waterside or on an artificial island of reeds called a kibasha; a more permanent island of layered reeds and mud was called a dibin. Houses had entrances at both ends and a screen in the middle; one end was used as a dwelling and the other end (sometimes extended with a sitra, a long reed structure) was used to shelter animals in bad weather. A raba was a higher-status dwelling, distinguished by a north-facing entrance, which also served as a guesthouse where there was no mudhif. Traditional boats (the mashoof and tarada) were used as transport: Ahwaris would drive buffalo through the reedbeds during the season of low water to create channels, which would then be kept open by constant use, for the boats.

The marsh environment meant that certain diseases, such as schistosomiasis and malaria, were endemic; Ahwari agriculture and homes were also vulnerable to periodic droughts and flooding.

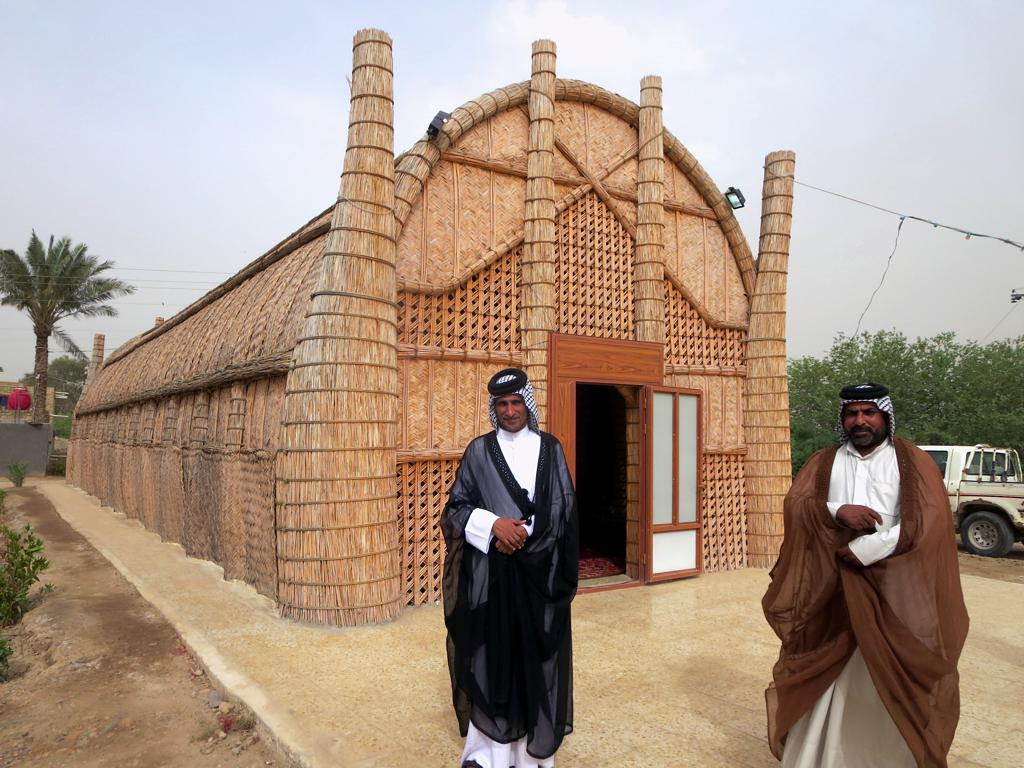
Men outside a mudhif reception hall

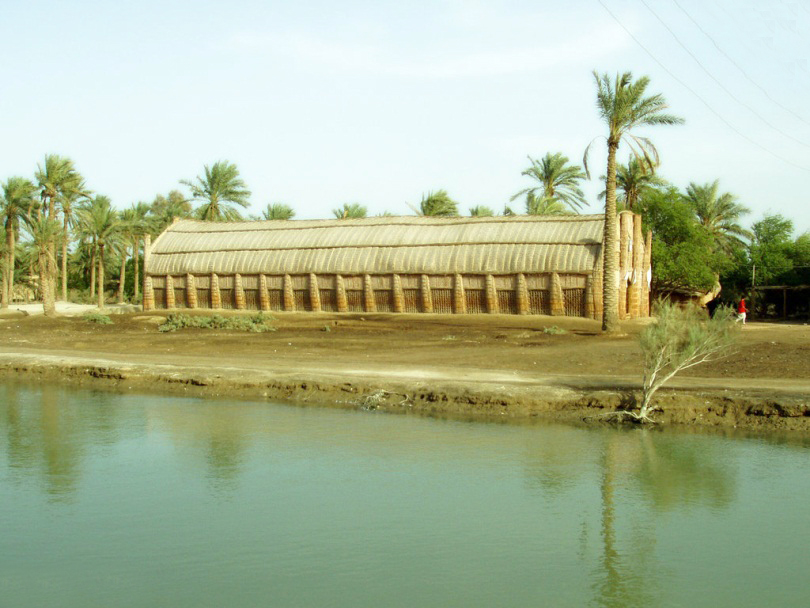
Ahwāri mudhif

== Literature ==
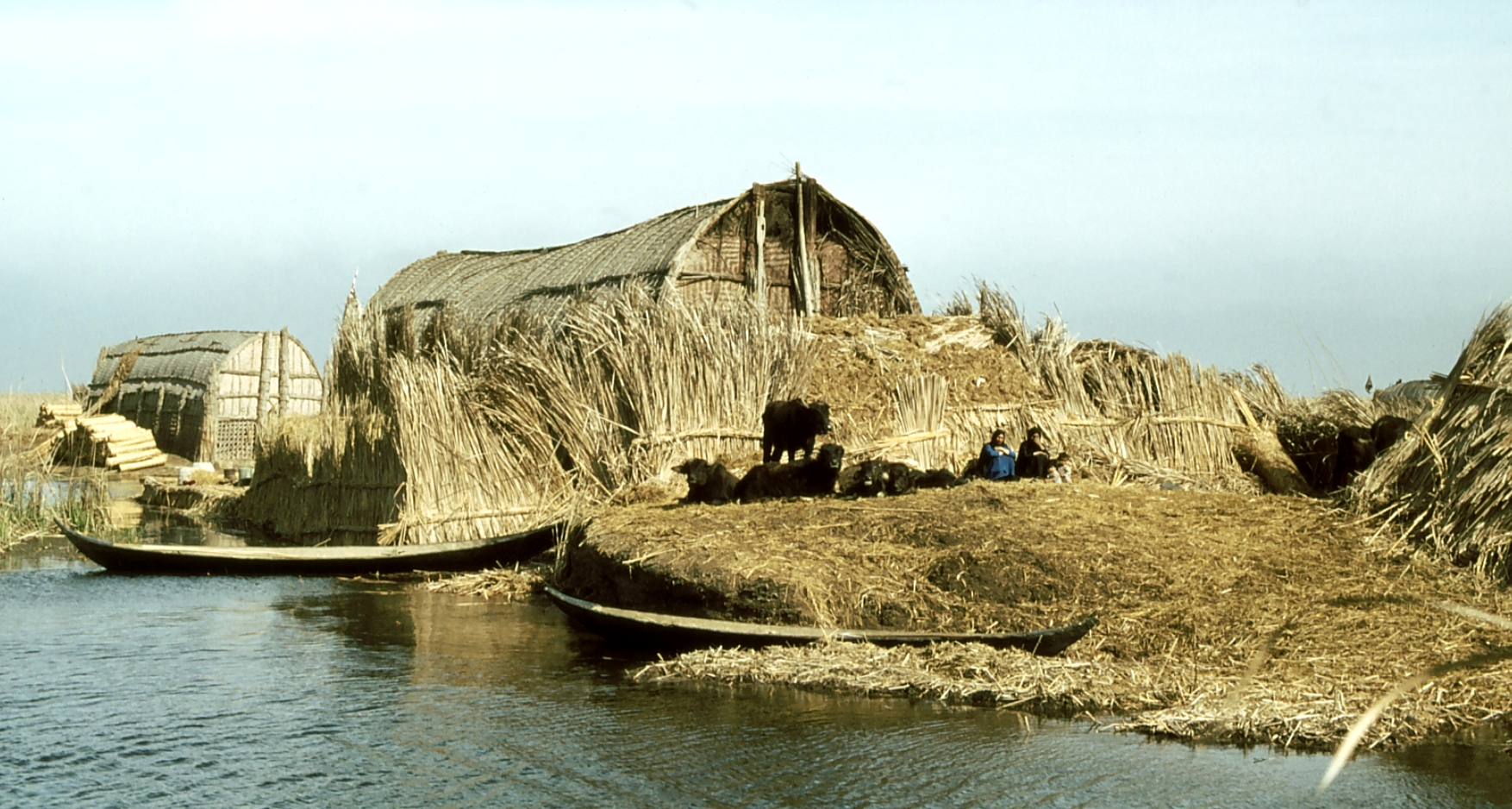
A reed house in the marshes of Basra Province, southern Iraq in 1978.

Pietro Della Valle (1586–1652) is cited in Gavin Young's Return to the Marshes as the earliest modern traveler to write about Mesopotamia and probably the first to introduce the word Madi, which he spelled "Maedi," to the Western world.

Young also mentions George Keppel, 6th Earl of Albemarle (1799–1891) as having spent time with the Madan in 1824 and reported in detail on the marsh inhabitants. Of the men Keppel wrote, "The Arab boatmen were as hardy and muscular-looking fellows as ever I saw. One loose brown shirt, of the coarseness of sack-cloth, was the only covering of the latter. This, when labour required it, was thrown aside, and discovered forms most admirably adapted to their laborious avocations; indeed, any of the boatmen would have made an excellent model for an Hercules; and one in particular, with uncombed hair and shaggy beard, struck us all with the resemblance he bore to statues of that deity." Of the women Keppel observed, "They came to our boat with the frankness of innocence and there was a freedom in their manners, bordering perhaps on the masculine; nevertheless their fine features and well-turned limbs produced a tout ensemble of beauty, not to be surpassed perhaps in the brilliant assemblies of civilized life."

Another account of Ahwaris in English was jointly published in 1927 by a British colonial administrator, Stuart Edwin Hedgecock, and his wife. Gertrude Bell also visited the area. T. E. Lawrence had passed through in 1916, stopping at Basra and Ezra's Tomb (Al-Azair), and recorded that the Marsh Arabs were "wonderfully hard [...] but merry, and full of talk. They are in the water all their lives, and seem hardly to notice it."

The way of life of the Marsh Arabs was later described by the explorer Wilfred Thesiger in his classic The Marsh Arabs (1964). Thesiger lived with the Marsh Arabs for months at a time over a seven-year period (1951–1958), building excellent relationships with virtually all he met, and recording the details of day-to-day life in various regions of the marshes. Many of the areas that he visited have since been drained.

Gavin Maxwell, the Scottish naturalist, travelled with Thesiger through the marshes in 1956 and published an account of their travels in his 1957 book A Reed Shaken by the Wind (later republished under the title People of the Reeds). The journalist and travel writer Gavin Young followed in Thesiger's footsteps, writing Return to the Marshes: Life with the Marsh Arabs of Iraq (1977; reissued 2009).

inside a reed mudhif reception hall

The first extensive scholarly ethnographic account of Marsh Arab life was Marsh Dwellers of the Euphrates Delta (1962), by Iraqi anthropologist S. M. Salim. An ethnoarchaeological study of the material culture of the Marsh Arabs has been published by Edward L. Ochsenschlager: Iraq's Marsh Arabs in the Garden of Eden (University of Pennsylvania Museum of Archaeology and Anthropology, 2004).

Rory Stewart described the Marsh Arabs and his experiences as deputy governor in the Maysan province (2003–2004) in his 2006 book, The Prince of the Marshes (also published under the title Occupational Hazards).

In 2011, Sam Kubba published The Iraqi Marshlands and the Marsh Arabs: The Ma'dan, Their Culture and the Environment. The Iraqi Marshlands and the Marsh Arabs details the rich cultural legacy and lifestyle that survives today only as a fragmented cultural inheritance.

In German, there are Sigrid Westphal-Hellbusch und Heinz Westphal, Die Ma'dan: Kultur und Geschichte der Marschenbewohner im Süd-Iraq (Berlin: Duncker und Humblot, 1962). Sigrid Westphal Hellbusch and her husband Heinz Westphal wrote a comprehensive study on the Madan based on research and observation obtained while living with Madan tribes. These observations outline how the Madan diverge from other Shia communities.

== Films ==
Films about Marsh Arabs:

- The Marshes (Al-Ahwar), directed by Kassem Hawal, 1975
- Zaman, The Man From The Reeds (Zaman, l'homme des roseaux), directed by Amer Alwan, 2003
- Silent Companion (Hamsafare Khamoosh), directed by Elham Hosseinzadeh, 2004
- Dawn of the World (L'Aube du monde), directed by Abbas Fahdel, 2008
- Iran, southwestern, directed by Mohammad Reza Fartousi, 2010
- The President's Cake, directed by Hasan Hadi, 2025

== Genetics ==
A 2011 study showed that Marsh Arabs have a high concentration of Y-chromosomal Haplogroup J-M267 and mtDNA haplogroup J having the highest concentration, with haplogroups H, U and T following, the study included 143 Marsh Arab samples. According to this study, Marsh Arabs have the following haplogroups.

- Y-DNA haplogroups:
  - E1b1b 6.3% (-M35* 2.1%, -M78* 0.7%, -M123* 1.4%, -M34 2.1%)
  - G-M201 1.4%
  - J1 81.1% (-M267* 7.0%, -P58 (Page08)* 72.7%, -M365 (shared with other J1 branches) 1.4%), J2-M172* 3.5%
  - L-M76 0.7%
  - Q-M242 2.8% (Q1a1b-M25 0.7%, Q1b-M378 2.1%)
  - R-M207 4.2% (R1-L23 2.8%, R2-M124 1.4%)
- Mt-DNA haplogroups:
  - West Eurasia (77.8%): R0 24.1% (R0* 0.7%, R0a 6.9%, HV 4.1%, H 12.4%), KU 15.9% (K 6.2%, U 9.7%), JT 22.7% (J 15.2%, T 7.6%), N 15.1% (I 0.7%, N1 8.2%, W 4.8%, X2 1.4%)
  - North/East Africa (2.8%): M1 2.8%
  - Sub-Saharan Africa (4.9%): L 4.9%
  - East Asia (1.4%): B4c2 1.4%
  - Southwest Asia (10.4%): M* 0.7%, M3 2.1%, R2 2.8%, U7 4.8%
  - Others (2.8%): N* 0.7%, R* 2.1%

== Notable Ahwari people ==
- Masoud El Amaratly, a mustarjil folk singer (died 1944)

== See also ==
- Al-Duraji, a tribal confederation of southern Iraq, with a large presence in the Marsh Arabs
- Al-Muntafiq, a tribal confederation of southern Iraq, with a large presence in the Marsh Arabs
- Edward Bawden
- Mandaeans
- Mudhif
- Shatt al-Arab
- Shroug
- Sumerians
- Tigris–Euphrates river system
