= Draining of the Mesopotamian Marshes =

Saddam Hussein's campaigns to drain marshes and force population transfer

Coordinates: 31°02′24″N 47°01′30″E

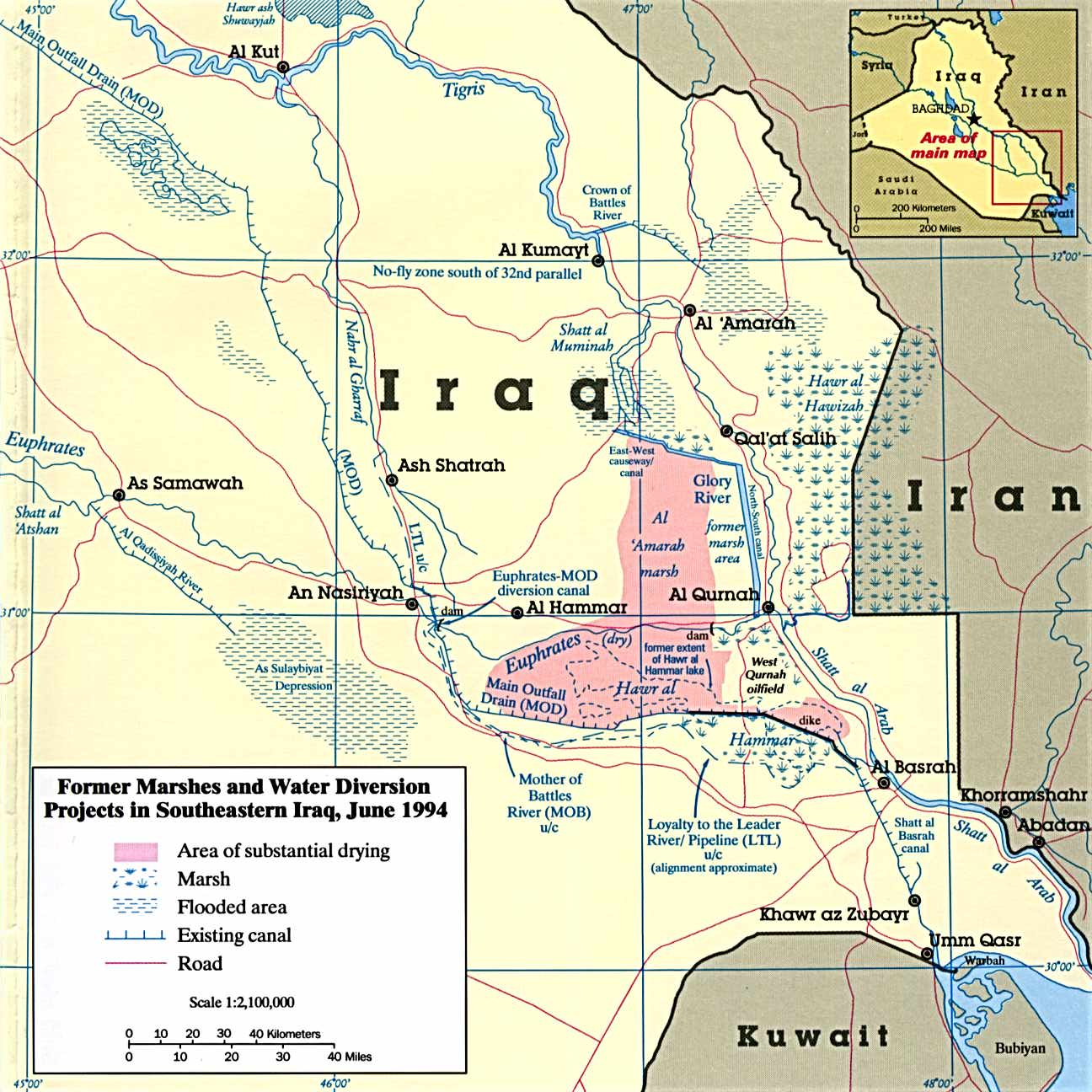
- A 1994 map of the Mesopotamian Marshes with the pink zones showing drained areas
- Date: 1950s–2003
- Location: Mesopotamian Marshes, Iraq
- Motive: Land reclamation and reprisal for the Shi'ite insurrection in 1991
- Organized by: Ba'athist Iraq
- Outcome: 90% of the marshlands disappeared by 2000; Desertification of over 7,500 square miles; 200,000 Marsh Arabs displaced

The Mesopotamian Marshes were drained in Iraq and to a smaller degree in Iran between the 1950s and 1990s to clear large areas of the marshes in the Tigris-Euphrates river system. The marshes formerly covered an area of around 20,000 km^{2} (7,700 mi^{2}). The main sub-marshes, the Hawizeh, Central, and Hammar marshes, were drained at different times for different reasons.

In the 1990s, the marshes were drained for political motives, namely to force the Marsh Arabs (or Ahwaris) out of the area and to punish them for their role in the 1991 uprising against Saddam Hussein's government. However, the government's stated reasoning was to reclaim land for agriculture and exterminate breeding grounds for mosquitoes. The displacement of more than 200,000 of the Ahwaris, and the associated state-sponsored campaign of violence against them, has led the United States and others to describe the draining of the marshes as ecocide, ethnic cleansing, or genocide.

The draining of the Mesopotamian Marshes has been described by the United Nations as a "tragic human and environmental catastrophe" on par with the deforestation of the Amazon rainforest and by other observers as one of the worst environmental disasters of the 20th century.

== History ==
Since the time of Sumer, agriculture in Mesopotamia involved major melioration, including drainage and building of irrigation canals. After the collapse of the Mesopotamian civilization and the Arab conquest the territory was derelict, which resulted in the restoration of the original wetland conditions. The wetlands were gradually populated by the Marsh Arabs, or Ahwaris, who grew rice and grazed buffalo on the natural vegetation. At times, the marshes have also served as a refuge for escaped rebels, such as during the Zanj Rebellion.

The former British Mandate administrators (Iraq became independent in 1932) were the first to attempt to drain the marshes, motivated by their role as a breeding ground for mosquitoes and lack of apparent economic value, as well as the potential use of the water for irrigation. Prepared in 1951, the Haigh Report outlined a series of sluices, embankments and canals on the lower ends of the Tigris and Euphrates that would drain water for agriculture. These notably included the Main Outfall Drain (MOD), a large canal also referred to as the Third River, and the Nasiriyah Drainage Pump Station. Neither were completed under British rule; they were later revived by the Ba'athist government.

During the 1970s, the expansion of irrigation projects had begun to disrupt the flow of water to the marshes; by the early 1980s, it was evident that these had significantly affected water levels. Part of the Hammar Marsh was also drained in 1985 during efforts to prepare the area for oil exploration.

By the mid-1980s, the marshes had become a refuge for people persecuted by the Ba'athist government of Saddam Hussein (Shi'ites in particular), and a low-level insurgency had developed against the drainage and resettlement projects, led by Sheik Abdul Kerim Mahud al-Muhammadawi of the Al bu Muhammad under the nom de guerre Abu Hatim.

== Gulf War draining ==
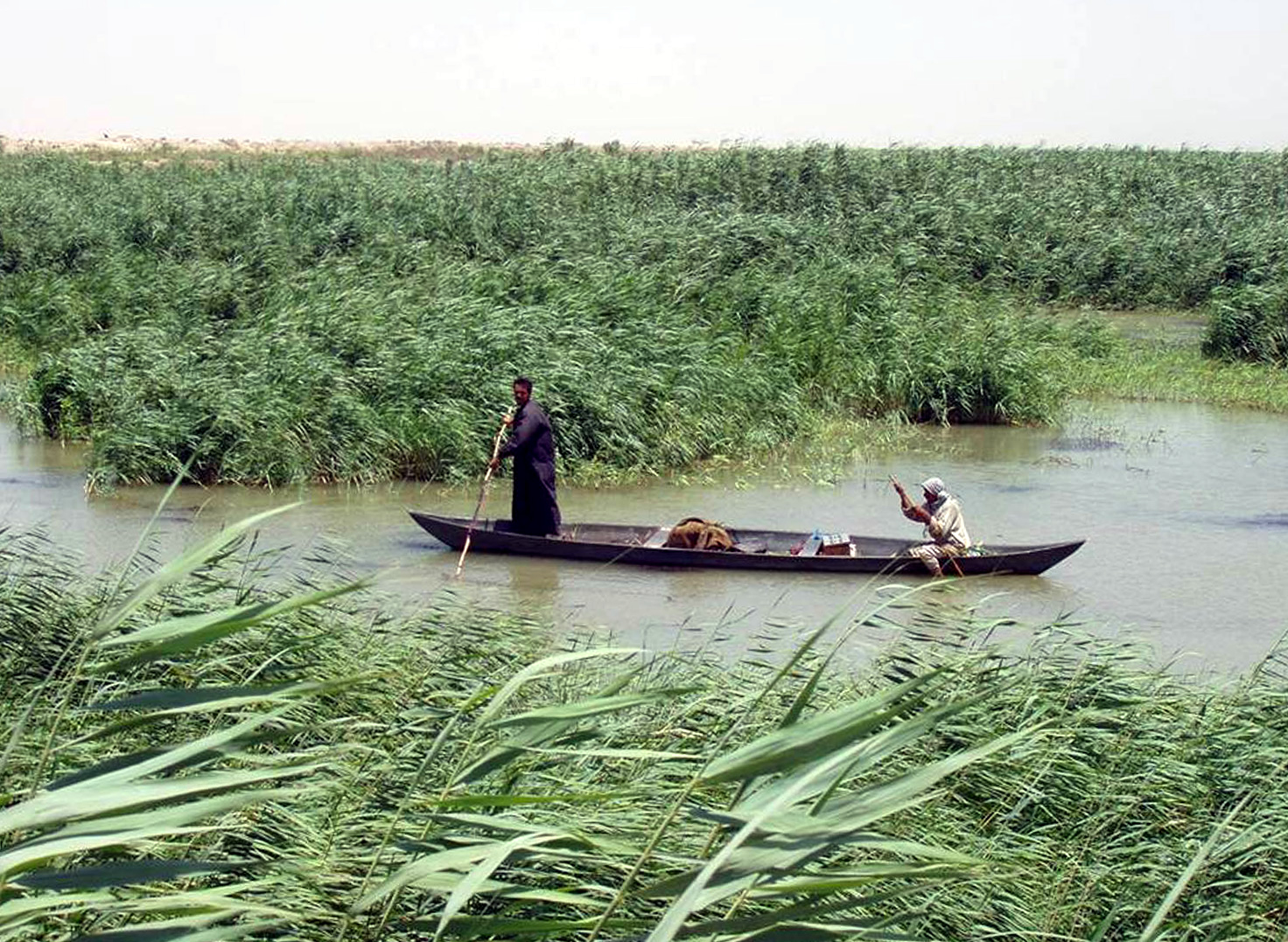
Marsh Arabs in the wetlands

After the First Gulf War (1991), the Iraqi government revived a program to divert the flow of the Tigris River and the Euphrates River away from the marshes. The marshes had served as a base for a Shi’a insurrection against Saddam Hussein's Sunni-led Ba'athist regime, so Saddam drained the marshes largely to deny their use by insurgents and to punish the Ahwaris for their participation in the uprising.

The flow southwards from the distributary streams of the Tigris was blocked by large embankments and discharged into the Al-Amarah or Glory Canal, resulting in the loss of two-thirds of the Central Marshes by as early as 1993. A further canal, the Prosperity Canal, was constructed to prevent any overflow into the marsh from the main channel of the Tigris as it ran southwards from Qalat Saleh. By the late 1990s, the Central Marsh had become completely desiccated, suffering the most severe damage of the three main areas of wetland. By 2000, the United Nations Environment Programme estimated that 90% of the marshlands had disappeared.

=== Environmental effects ===
The Central Marshes stretched between Nasiriyah, Al-'Uzair (Ezra's Tomb) and Al-Qurnah and were mainly fed by the Tigris and its distributaries. They were characterised by tall qasab reeds and included a number of freshwater lakes, the largest of which were the Haur az-Zikri and Umm al-Binni (literally "mother of binni", the latter being a species of barbel). The marshes support breeding populations of the Basra reed-warbler and marbled teal, along with several other species of non-breeding birds.

Conservationists predicted that the Levant darter (Anhinga rufa chantrei), a subspecies of the African darter, and the maxwelli subspecies of the smooth-coated otter had disappeared entirely, but small threatened populations remain of both. Conservationists also feared the extinction of the Bunn's short-tailed bandicoot rat (Nesokia bunnii, syn. Erythronesokia bunnii), which had only been described from specimens obtained in the Central Marshes. It is listed as endangered on the International Union for Conservation of Nature Red List as of August 2021.

A study by the Wetland Ecosystem Research Group at Royal Holloway, University of London concluded that thousands of fish and waterfowl died as the waters receded, and that the central Qurnah marshes 'essentially no longer exist as an ecosystem'.

According to a 2001 United Nations Environment Programme report, the projects resulted in:

- The loss of a migration area for birds migrating from Eurasia to Africa and consequent decrease in bird populations in areas such as Ukraine and the Caucasus
- Probable extinction of several plant and animal species endemic to the Marshes
- Higher soil salinity in the Marshes and adjacent areas, resulting in loss of dairy production, fishing, and rice cultivation
- Desertification of over 7,500 square miles (19,000 km^{2})
- Saltwater intrusion and increased flow of pollutants into the Shatt-al-Arab waterway, causing disruption of fisheries in the Persian Gulf

=== Demographic effects ===
The water diversion plan, which was accompanied by a series of propaganda articles by the Iraqi regime directed against the Ahwaris, systematically converted the wetlands into a desert, forcing the residents out of their settlements in the region. The western Hammar Marshes and the Qurnah or Central Marshes became completely desiccated, while the eastern Hawizeh Marshes dramatically shrank. Furthermore, villages in the marshes were torched, water was deliberately poisoned, and villagers' vehicles were attacked by government helicopters. Several thousand Marsh Arabs were killed.

The majority of the Ahwaris were displaced either to areas adjacent to the drained marshes, abandoning their traditional lifestyle in favour of conventional agriculture, or to towns and camps in other areas of Iraq. An estimated 80,000 to 120,000 fled to refugee camps in Iran. The Marsh Arabs, who numbered about half a million in the 1950s, have dwindled to as few as 20,000 in Iraq. Only 1,600 of them were estimated to still be living on traditional dibins in their homeland by 2003.

=== Political response ===
The AMAR International Charitable Foundation described the event as "an environmental and humanitarian catastrophe of monumental proportions with regional and global implications."

Besides the general UN-imposed Gulf war sanctions, there was no specific legal recourse for those displaced by the drainage projects, or prosecution of those involved. Article 2.c of the Genocide Convention, to which Iraq had acceded in 1951, forbids "deliberately inflicting on the group conditions of life calculated to bring about its physical destruction in whole or in part." Additionally, the Saint Petersburg Declaration of 1868 says that "the only legitimate object which States should endeavour to accomplish during war is to weaken the military forces of the enemy", a provision potentially violated by the Ba'athist government as part of their campaign against the insurgents which had taken refuge in the marshlands. However, Iraq is not a signatory on the treaty.

Since water flowed unfiltered into the Gulf through the newly dug canal system, the Kuwait Regional Convention for Co-operation on the Protection of the Marine Environment from Pollution could be used to compensate Iraq's neighbours for the increase in marine pollution, but it does not protect the Ahwaris for the loss of their marshlands.

== Reflooding ==
Following the 2003 U.S. invasion of Iraq, many embankments and drainage works were dismantled under the newly formed administration, and the marshes began to refill. Some of this dismantling was done by local Marsh Arabs acting on their own. The Central Marshes showed little recovery through 2003, but by early 2004 a patchwork of lakes had appeared in northern areas. There was flooding in southern areas which had previously been dry since the early 1990s.

There has been some corresponding recolonization by the natural marsh vegetation since that time, and return of some species of fish and birds. However, recovery of the Central Marshes has been much slower compared to the Huwaizah and Hammar Marshes; the most severely damaged sections of the wetlands did not show any signs of regeneration by 2006. By 2008, 75% of the marshes had been restored, including most of the Central Marshes. However, the wetlands have since shrunk to 58% of their pre-drainage area and are projected to drop below 50% as a result of Turkish and Iranian damming of the Tigris and Euphrates, which the UN reports has reduced the combined volume of the rivers by 60%. Further, the water quality and salinity is much worse than in the pre-drained marshes: water salinity has soared to 15,000 parts per million (ppm) in some areas, up from 300 to 500 ppm in the 1980s. This increased salinity has hindered the reintroduction of native plant and fish species and has had major detrimental effects on buffalo herding and fishing in the marshes, the chief economic activities of the Marsh Arabs. 2010 research in the Central Marshes attributed the increased salinity and decreased water quality to the limitation of the water source to only the Euphrates, a smaller seasonal fluctuation in water inflow and outflow, and inputs of contaminated water from farms and villages.

== See also ==
- Aral Sea - a partially dried lake
- Environmental issues in Iraq
- List of environmental disasters
- Mudhif - distinctive and ancient style of reed structure adversely affected by the drainage program
- The Sudd - a large marshland in Africa, planned site of the Jonglei Canal, another large-scale drainage project within a desert ecosystem
