= Ahwar of Southern Iraq =

UNESCO World Heritage Site
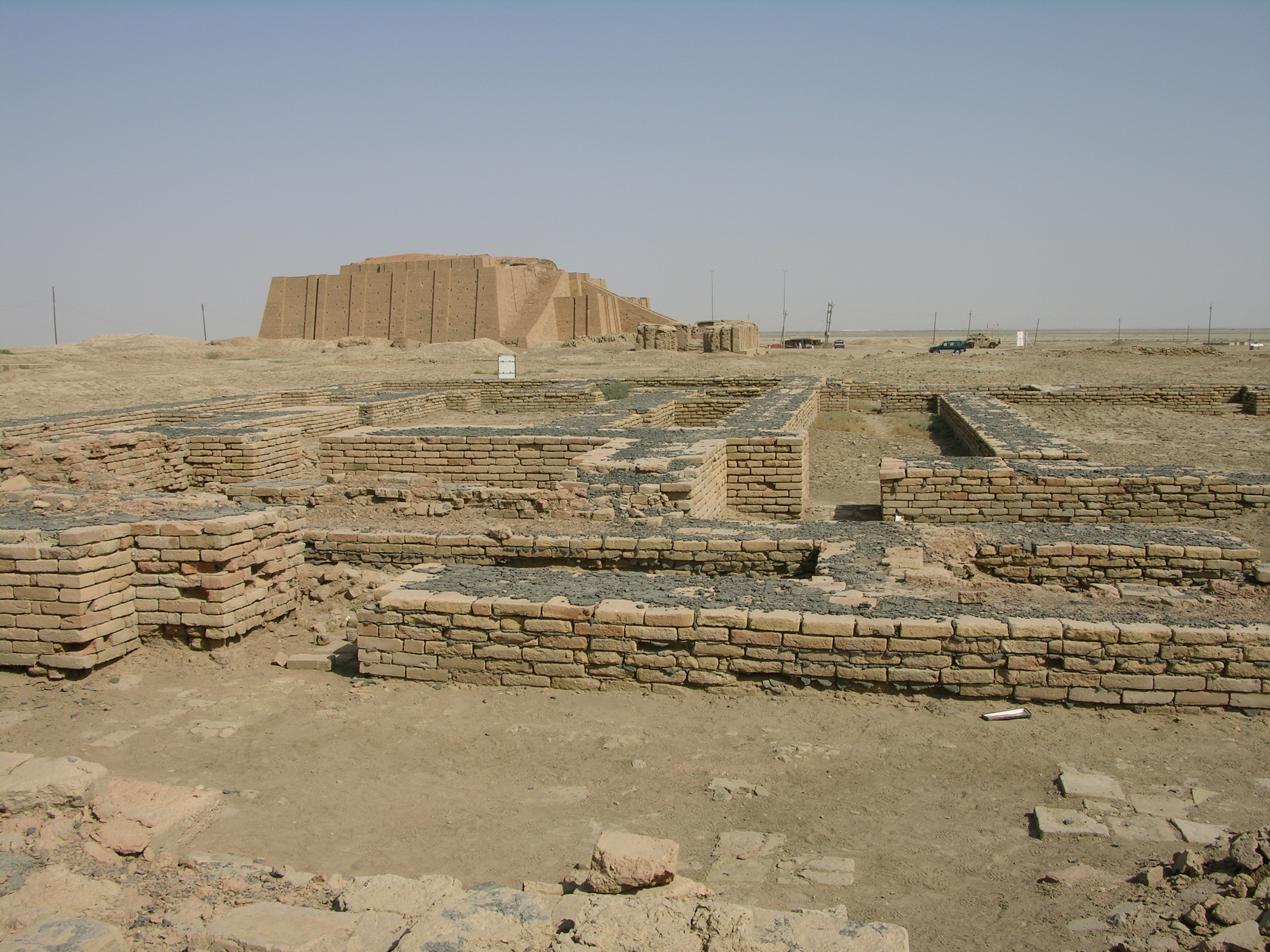
- The ruins of Ur, with the Ziggurat of Ur visible in the background

- Location within Iraq
- Official name: The Ahwar of Southern Iraq: Refuge of Biodiversity and the Relict Landscape of the Mesopotamian Cities
- Location: Iraq
- Includes: 4 marshes and 3 cities
- Criteria: Mixed: (iii), (v), (ix), (x)
- Reference: 1481
- Inscription: 2016 (40th Session)
- Area: 211,544 ha (816.78 sq mi)
- Buffer zone: 209,321 ha (808.19 sq mi)
- Coordinates: 31°33′44″N 47°39′28″E

The Ahwar (Note: Ahwar is an Arabic word for marshland.) of Southern Iraq: Refuge of Biodiversity and the Relict Landscape of the Mesopotamian Cities is a UNESCO World Heritage Site in Southern Iraq sometimes called the "Garden of Eden" by Biblical scholars. It consists of marshlands and ancient cities sustained by the Tigris and Euphrates rivers.

The Ahwar of Southern Iraq currently consists of seven sites, including three cities of Sumerian origin and four wetland areas of the Mesopotamian Marshes:

1. Huwaizah Marshes
2. Central Marshes
3. East Hammar Marshes
4. West Hammar Marshes
5. Uruk Archaeological City
6. Ur Archaeological City
7. Tell Eridu Archaeological Site

== Inscription ==
The Ahwar of Southern Iraq were inscribed as a World Heritage Site in July 2016. Some believe its inscription may protect the natural environment and encourage further conservation. Since the inscription, native wildlife and Marsh Arabs have returned to the region.

== Tourism ==
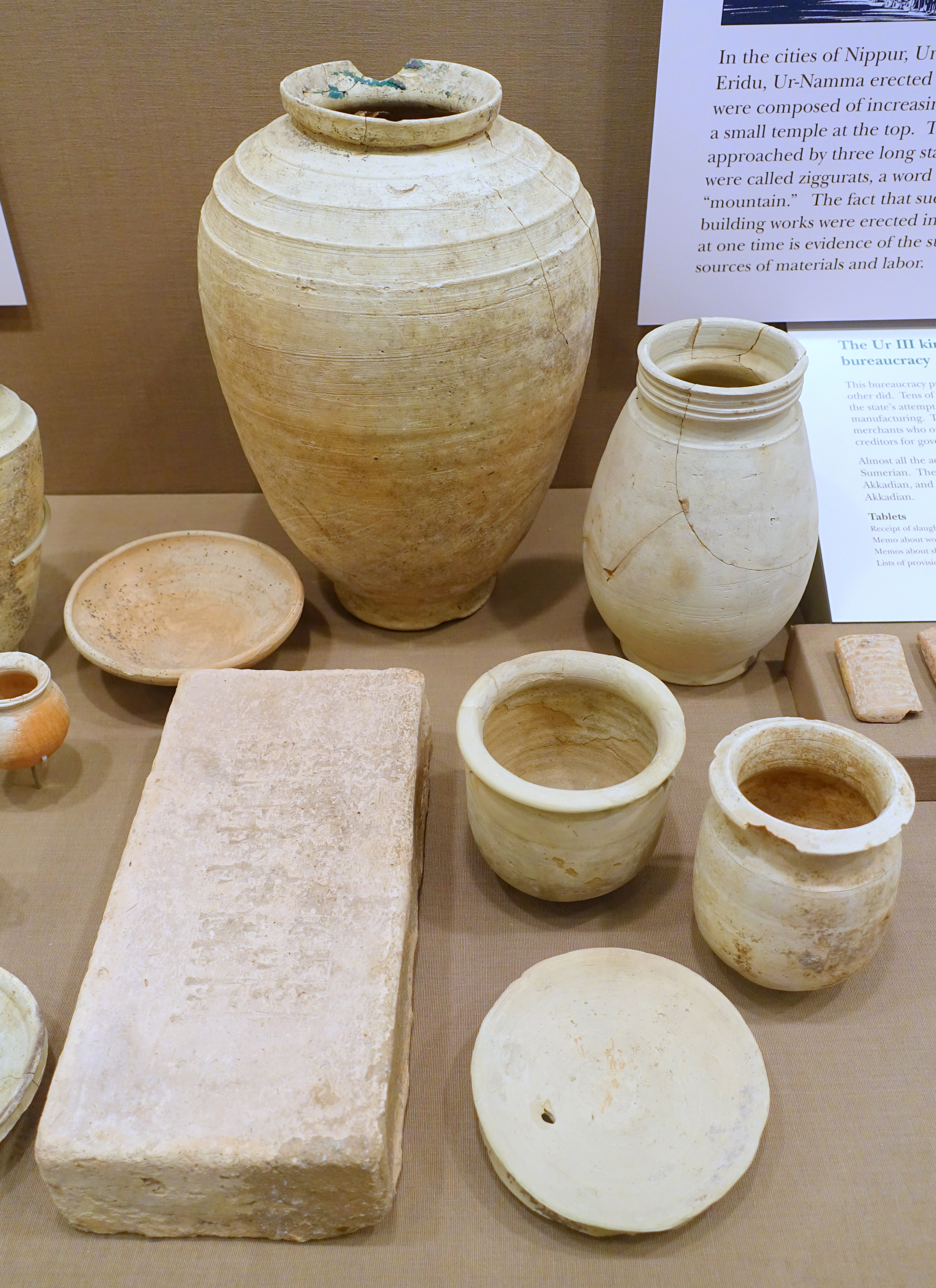
Pottery from Ur and Eridu. Pottery shards are common targets of looting by tourists

Iraqis from different regions and some foreign tourists visit the marshlands each year. Tourists can paddle on the rivers on a reef raft and have lunch in the traditional mudhif guesthouse. However, there is little infrastructure to support the rising demands of tourism.

Tourists by year since UNESCO inscription
| | Tourists |
|---|---|
| 2016 | 10,000 |
| 2017 | 12,000 |
| 2018 | 18,000 |

Through Nature Iraq, Iraqi-American environmentalist Azzam Alwash set up an eco-camp in the Ahwar area. Tourists can stay in modernized reed houses, go out on boats, and eat breakfasts of water buffalo cream and flatbread baked over reed fires.

Looting is a tourism-related issue common in the cities of the Ahwar World Heritage Site, particularly among the popular destination of Ur. In 2022, two foreign tourists faced the death penalty for illegally smuggling pottery shards from the site of Eridu out of the country as souvenirs.

== Conservation ==
The Ahwar of Southern Iraq is listed as in critical condition by conservationists. Issues related to oil exploration, hunting and fishing, tourism, war, and climate change threaten the natural habitat of the World Heritage Site.

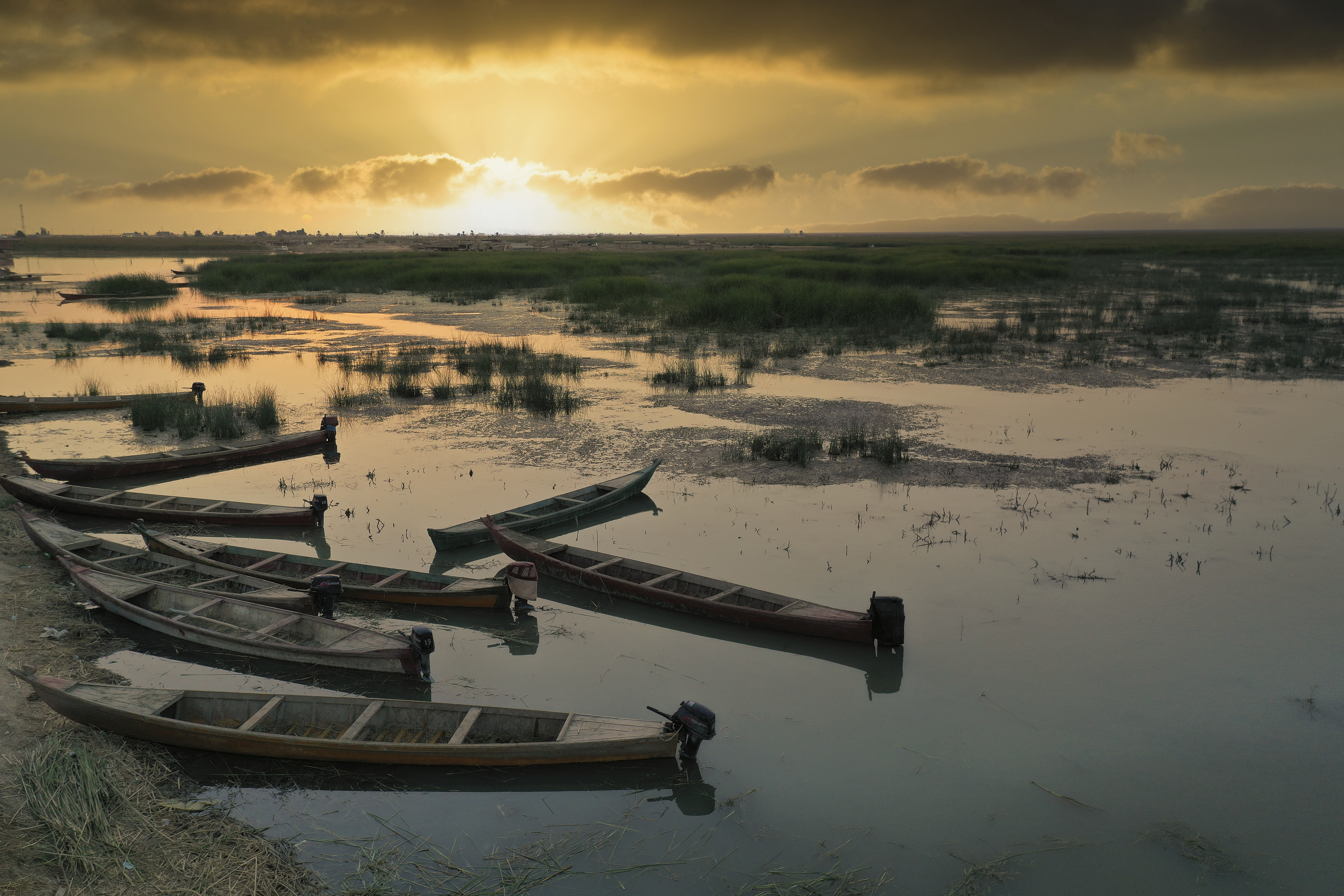
The marshes of Al-Jubayish in the Iraqi city of Dhi Qar

The marshlands once stretched over 20,000 square kilometers (7,700 square miles). In the 1990s, the president of Iraq Saddam Hussein ordered them drained, in order to stop them being used as hideouts by Shia protestors opposed to his regime. This shrunk the size of the marshlands significantly. Since Saddam Hussein's removal in 2003, efforts have been made to restore the marshes. The previously established dams and canals have been removed.

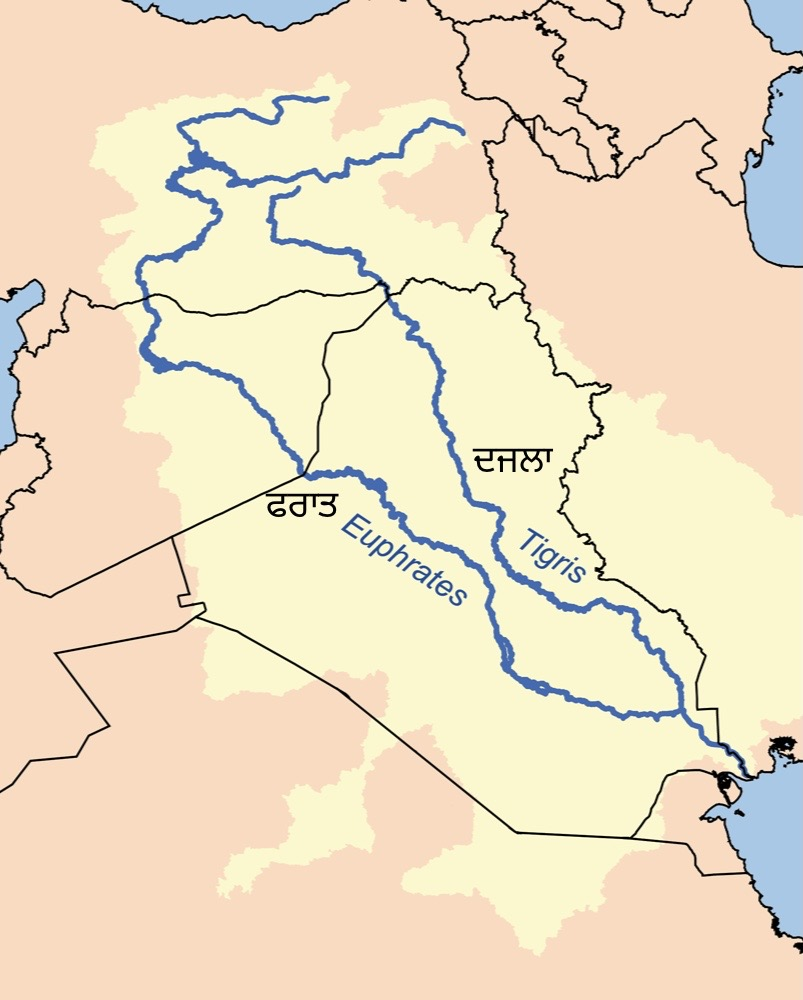
The Tigris and Euphrates river basin

=== Drought ===
In recent years, severe drought has threatened the marshlands. The United Nations has predicted that its rivers may be entirely dry by 2040. Record low rainfall in 2021 exacerbated the issue. Today, only 4% of the original marshland in Iraq remains. Water buffalo farmers have been forced to evacuate in search of better living conditions.

Dams from water sources originating in Turkey and Iran have been partially blamed for the drought in Iraq. Turkey has 22 dams on the Tigris and Euphrates; notably, the Ilisu Dam is the third largest in the world. Iran cut off the Alwand River in 2011, preventing the river from entering Iraq entirely.

== In popular culture ==
- The 2025 film The President's Cake depicts a Marsh Arab family living in the Ahwar of Southern Iraq region

== See also ==
- https://www.meer.com/en/81641-the-marshes-and-marshmen-of-southern-iraq
