= Glory River =

Canal in Iraq

Coordinates: 31°19′25″N 47°20′31″E

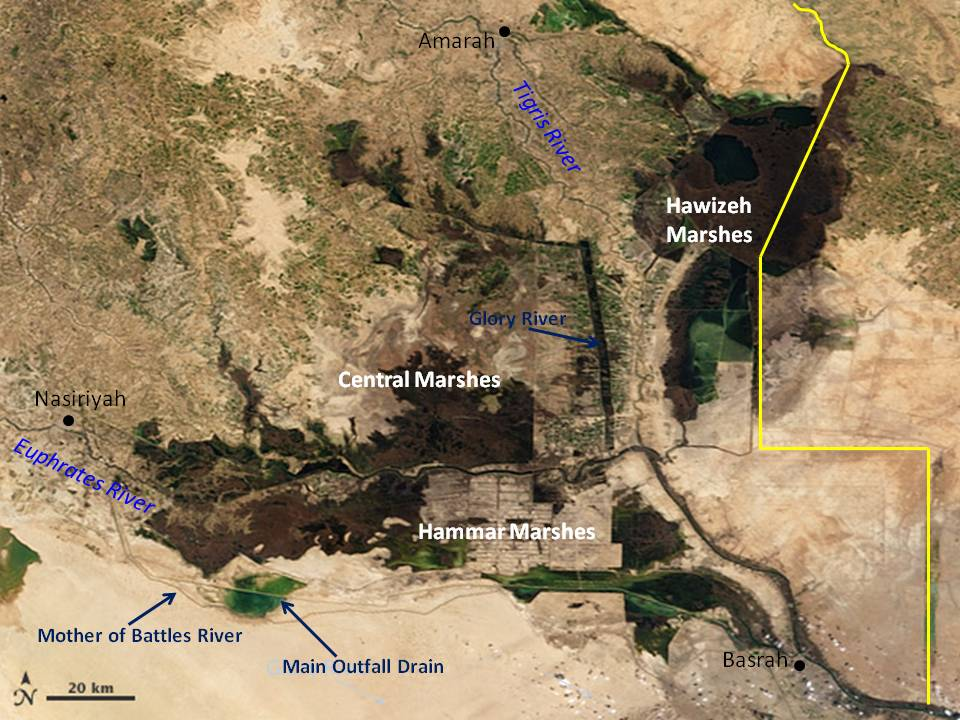
A map of the Mesopotamian Marshes showing the Glory River.

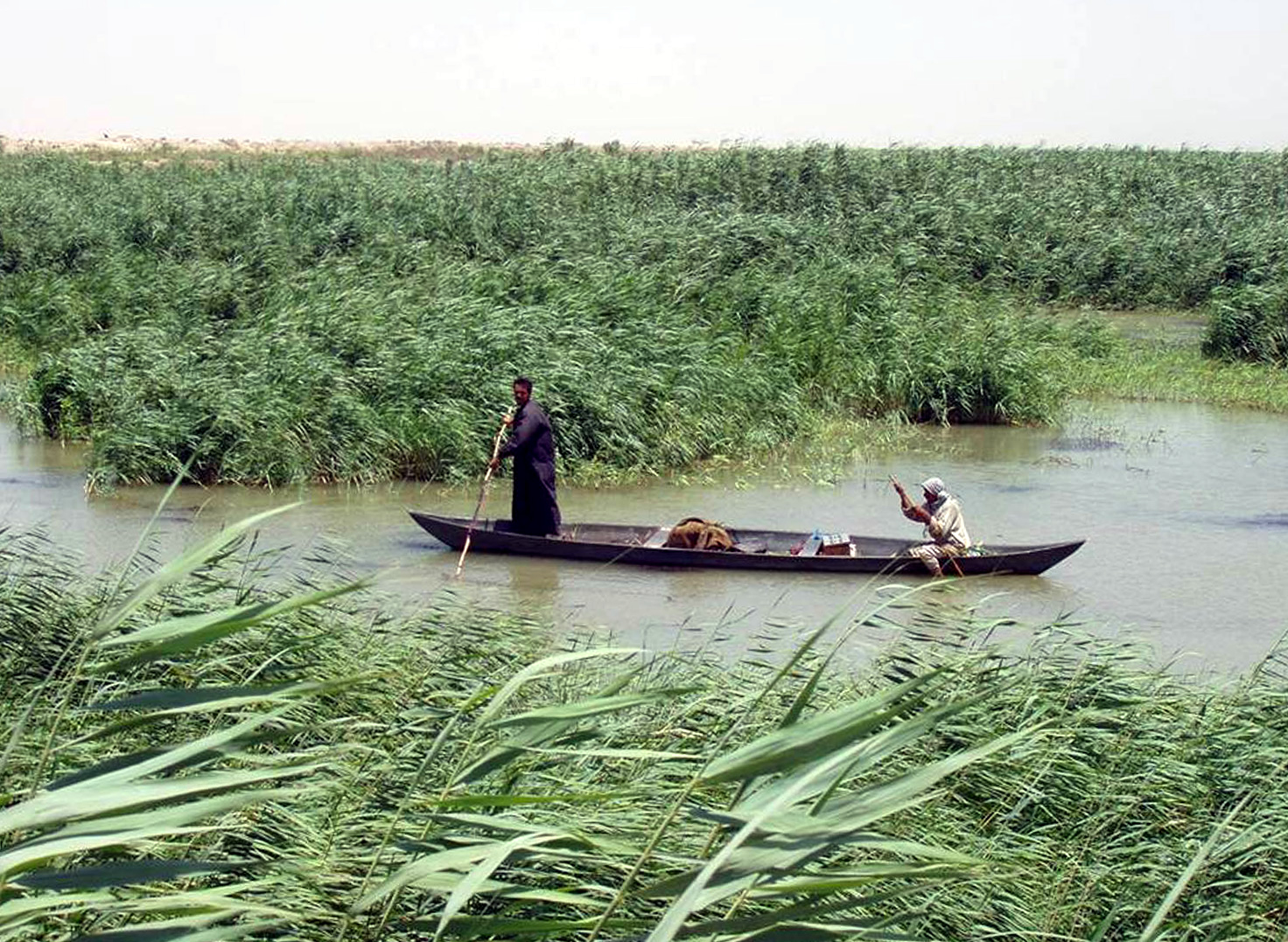
Marsh Arabs on a mashoof in the marshes of southern Iraq.

The Glory River (Nahar al-Aaz), Glory Canal or Prosperity Canal is a shallow canal in Iraq about two kilometers wide built by Saddam Hussein in 1993 to redirect water flowing from the Tigris river into the Euphrates, near their confluence at the Shatt al-Arab. It helped cause an environmental and humanitarian disaster since it diverted natural water flow from the Central Marshes and effectively converted much of the wetlands into a desert.

After the First Gulf War, Saddam Hussein aggressively revived a program to divert the flow of the Tigris and the Euphrates rivers away from the marshes in retribution for a failed Shia uprising in 1991. Draining of the Mesopotamian Marshes directly affected the Marsh Arabs, forcing them to abandon the settlements in the region. Since the overthrow of Hussein in the 2003 invasion of Iraq, the marshland ecoregion has recovered substantially with the breaching of dikes by local communities.

== See also ==
- Marsh Arabs
- Tigris-Euphrates river system
- Environmental issues in Iraq
