= Ash Shabaziyah, Iraq =

Coordinates: 30°57′N 47°28′E

Al-Basrah in Iraq.

Ash Shabaziyah, Iraq is a village of Basrah Governorate in southern Iraq located on the west bank of the Shatt Al-Arab River between the Shatt al Arab and Hamma marshes. The town has a primary school and at least 3 mosques. The area is close to the Mesopotamian Marshes(Hammar Marshes), and has traditionally been home to many Marsh Arabs.

The topography if flat with an elevation of 6 meters above sea level., and the climate is arid.

The area suffered greatly during the Iran–Iraq War, during which it was a major battlefield, and again after the 1991 Iraqi uprising.
