= Qaryat Nasr, Iraq =

Coordinates: 30°47′N 47°33′E

Qaryat Nasr (نصر ) is a town of Basrah Governorate in southern Iraq, on the west bank of the Shatt Al-Arab River. Qaryat Nasr, Iraq is located at 30.78n and 47.55e.

The town has one of the few bridges over the Shatt Al-Arab. There is a Muslim shrine in the village. The area is close to the Mesopotamian Marshes(Hammar Marshes), and has traditionally been home to many Marsh Arabs.

The area suffered greatly during the Iran–Iraq War, during which it was a major battlefield, and again after the 1991 Iraqi uprising.
