= Hawizeh =

Hawizeh may refer to:

- Hawizeh Marshes, marshes in Khuzestan Province
- Hoveyzeh, a city in Khuzestan Province
