= Nasiriyah Drainage Pump Station =

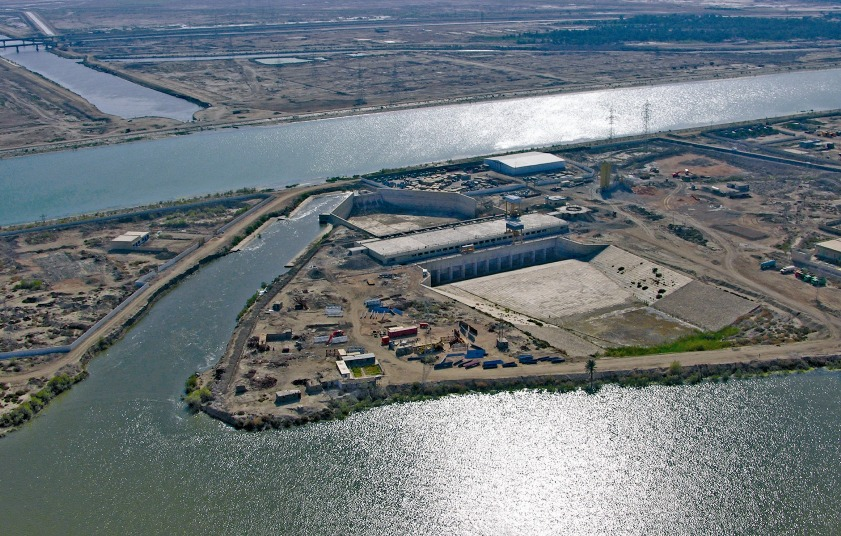
- The pump station prior to first operation
- Interactive map of the Nasiriyah Drainage Pump Station area

General information
- Location: Nasiriyah, Iraq
- Coordinates: 30°58′24″N 46°20′11″E
- Construction started: 1983
- Completed: 2009
- Cost: $100 million + USD (Since 2003)
- Client: Ministry of Water Resources

Design and construction
- Engineer: U.S. Army Corps of Engineers (From 2003-2009)

The Nasiriyah Drainage Pump Station is a land drainage pumping station in Iraq 10 km southeast of Nasiriyah in the province of Dhi Qar. The station pumps farm run-off collected by the Main Outfall Drain (MOD) north of the Euphrates River in Dhi Qar and Muthanna provinces to a siphon under the Euphrates where it is then returned to the MOD and eventually discharged in the Persian Gulf. The pump station relieves water back-up and is a critical component of a larger agricultural drainage system designed to drain 1.5 million hectares of land in order to reduce soil salinity. Consisting of 12 pumps, each with a 20 m³/second (316,000 gal/min) capacity, it is the largest drainage pump in the Middle East.

== History ==
In 1951, British engineer Frank Haigh developed his Haigh Report for the Iraqi government which laid out drainage infrastructure for the Mesopotamian Marshes in order to reclaim the land for agriculture. His report recommended a complex of canals, sluices and dikes on the lower portions of both the Tigris and Euphrates. In 1953, construction began on the Main Outfall Drain, also known as the Third River, which would drain water from the Central Marshes through a canal and eventually into the Persian Gulf. Construction on the Nasiriyah Drainage Pump Station, which would serve to pump the water to a siphon under the Euphrates, did not begin until 1983. A Brazilian contractor worked on the pump station until 1986 when political upheaval forced a construction halt. Construction continued in 1992, the same year the MOD was completed, but was intermittent until 1999 because of flooding and structural failures. Aside from agriculture, the MOD was viewed as a tool for Saddam Hussein to drain the Central Marshes in order to deny a refuge for Shia Muslims after the 1991 uprisings in Iraq.

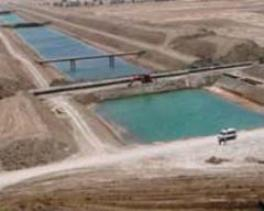
A section of the Eastern Euphrates Drain

After the 2003 Invasion of Iraq, the U.S. Army Corps of Engineers awarded Washington International Inc. a $78 million contract to complete the pump station. The original contract had included digging out the moth-balled pump station along with installing the internal electronic system, nine of the pumps, gates, and completing a major portion of the concrete siphon. Construction began again in August 2005 but problems with concrete and electrical components put the project over budget at $80 million. The increased costs led the Corps of Engineers and U.S. Government to terminate construction at 70% completion and transfer the project to the Government of Iraq. After the Iraq Government agreed, it was transitioned to their control on March 1, 2007. Later, in June 2007, Iraq's Ministry of Water Resources signed grant agreement for $20 million in U.S. funding that would help complete the pump station. The pump station opened on December 1, 2008 and was eventually completed in February 2009 but was originally projected to be completed on December 31, 2007.

Accompanying the pump station was an additional Corps of Engineers project, the Eastern Euphrates Drain (EED), which consisted of a series of drainage canals in Muthanna Province that eventually connected via one large canal to the MOD before reaching the pump station. The $38.5 million project was completed at the end of 2009. The EED is one of several canals connecting to the MOD and was specifically designed to reclaim 58,000 hectares of land and drain an additional 400,000. In total, the 240 m³/second capacity pump station helps drain a 1.5 million hectare area via the MOD.

== See also ==
- Draining of the Mesopotamian Marshes
