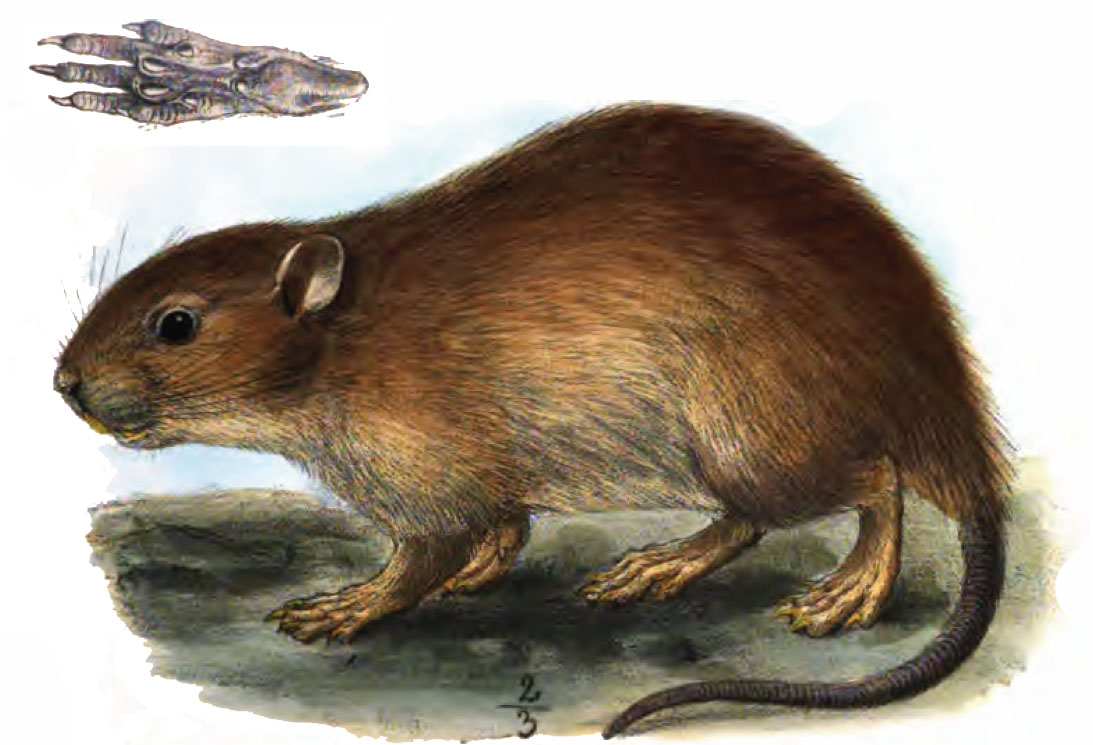
- Short-tailed bandicoot rat (Nesokia indica)

Scientific classification
- Domain: Eukaryota
- Kingdom: Animalia
- Phylum: Chordata
- Class: Mammalia
- Order: Rodentia
- Family: Muridae
- Tribe: Rattini
- Genus: Nesokia; Gray, 1842

Species
- Nesokia bunnii Nesokia indica

= Nesokia =

Nesokia Temporal range: Pliocene - Recent

Genus of rodents

Nesokia is a genus of rodent in the family Muridae endemic to West Asia and Central Asia known as the short-tailed bandicoot rats.

== Species ==
Genus Nesokia - short-tailed bandicoot rats:

- Short-tailed bandicoot rat (Nesokia indica) Gray, 1842
- Bunn's short-tailed bandicoot rat (Nesokia bunnii) (Khajuria, 1981)
