= Central Marshes =

Marshes in Iraq; UNESCO World Heritage site

UNESCO World Heritage Site
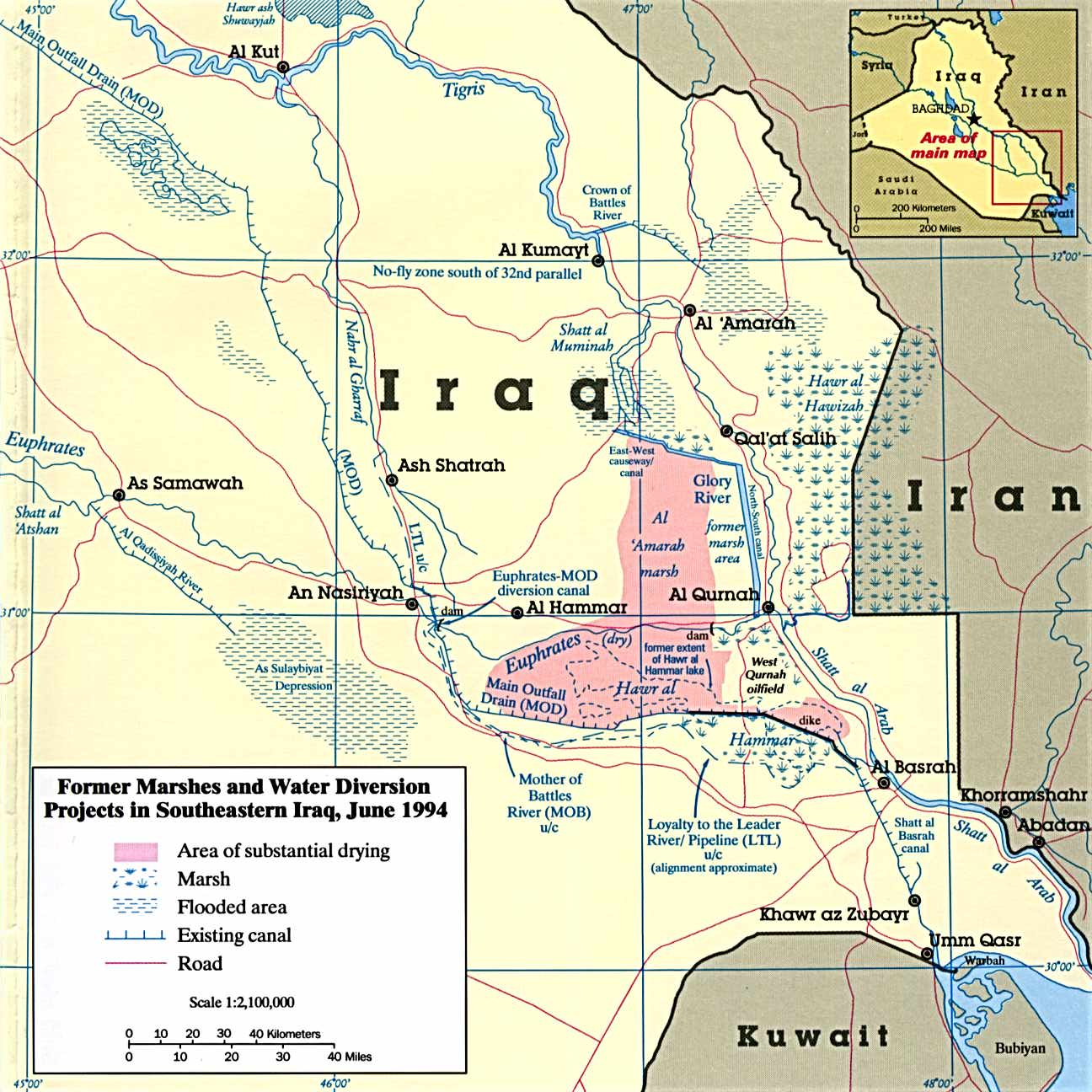
- 1994 Map of The Mesopotamian Marshes with draining features

- Location within Iraq
- Location: Iraq
- Part of: Ahwar of Southern Iraq
- Criteria: Mixed: (iii)(v)(ix)(x)
- Reference: 1481-002
- Inscription: 2016 (40th Session)
- Area: 62,435 ha (241.06 sq mi)
- Buffer zone: 83,958 ha (324.16 sq mi)
- Coordinates: 31°5′7″N 47°3′15″E

Ramsar Wetland
- Designated: 7 April 2014
- Reference no.: 2241

The Central or Qurna Marshes are a large complex of wetlands in Iraq that, along with the Hawizeh and Hammar marshes, make up the Mesopotamian Marshes of the Tigris–Euphrates river system. Formerly covering an area of around 3000 square kilometres, they were almost completely drained following the 1991 uprisings in Iraq and have in recent years been reflooded.

== Characteristics ==
The Central Marshes stretched between Nasiriyah, Al-'Uzair (Ezra's Tomb) and Al-Qurnah and were mainly fed by the Tigris and its distributaries (the Shatt al-Muminah and Majar al-Kabir). They were drained by the (partially artificial) Prosperity Canal, and by the Glory River. The Central Marshes were characterised by tall qasab reeds but included a number of freshwater lakes, of which the largest were the Haur az-Zikri and Umm al-Binni (literally "mother of binni", the latter being a species of barbel.) The marshes support breeding populations of the Basra reed-warbler and marbled teal, along with several other species of non-breeding birds. It was feared that the Levant darter (Anhinga rufa chantrei), a subspecies of the African darter, and the maxwelli subspecies of the smooth-coated otter had disappeared entirely, but small and threatened populations remain of both. It is feared that the Bunn's short-tailed bandicoot rat (Nesokia bunnii, syn. Erythronesokia bunnii), which had only been described from specimens obtained in the Central Marshes, is extinct.

The area was formerly populated by the Marsh Arabs or Ma'dan, who grazed buffalo on the natural vegetation and carried out cultivation of rice.

== Draining ==
By the early 1980s, it was evident that irrigation projects were already affecting water levels in the marshes. In the early 1990s, the government of Iraq undertook a series of major drainage projects, at least partly in retribution for the events of the 1991 uprisings, and to prevent the area being used as a refuge by militias. The flow southwards from the distributary streams of the Tigris was blocked by large embankments and discharged into the Al-Amarah or Glory Canal, resulting in the loss of two-thirds of the Central Marshes by as early as 1993. A further canal, the Prosperity Canal, was constructed to prevent any overflow into the marsh from the main channel of the Tigris as it ran southwards from Qalat Saleh. By the late 1990s, the Central Marsh had become completely desiccated, suffering the most severe damage of the three main areas of wetland. By 2000, United Nations Environment Programme estimated that 90% of the marshlands had disappeared.

== Reflooding ==
Following the 2003 U.S. invasion of Iraq, embankments and drainage works were broken open, and the marshes began to reflood. The Central Marshes showed little recovery through 2003, but by early 2004 a patchwork of lakes had appeared in northern areas; there was flooding in southern areas which had previously been dry since the early 1990s. There has been some corresponding recolonisation by the natural marsh vegetation since that time, and return of some species of fish and birds, although recovery of the Central Marshes has been much slower compared to the Huwaizah and Hammar Marshes; the most severely damaged sections of the wetlands have yet to show any signs of regeneration. Bunn's short-tailed bandicoot rat is suspected to have become extinct.
