= Hawizeh Marshes =

Marshes in Iran and Iraq; UNESCO World Heritage site

Iraqi side of Hawizeh Marshes
UNESCO World Heritage Site
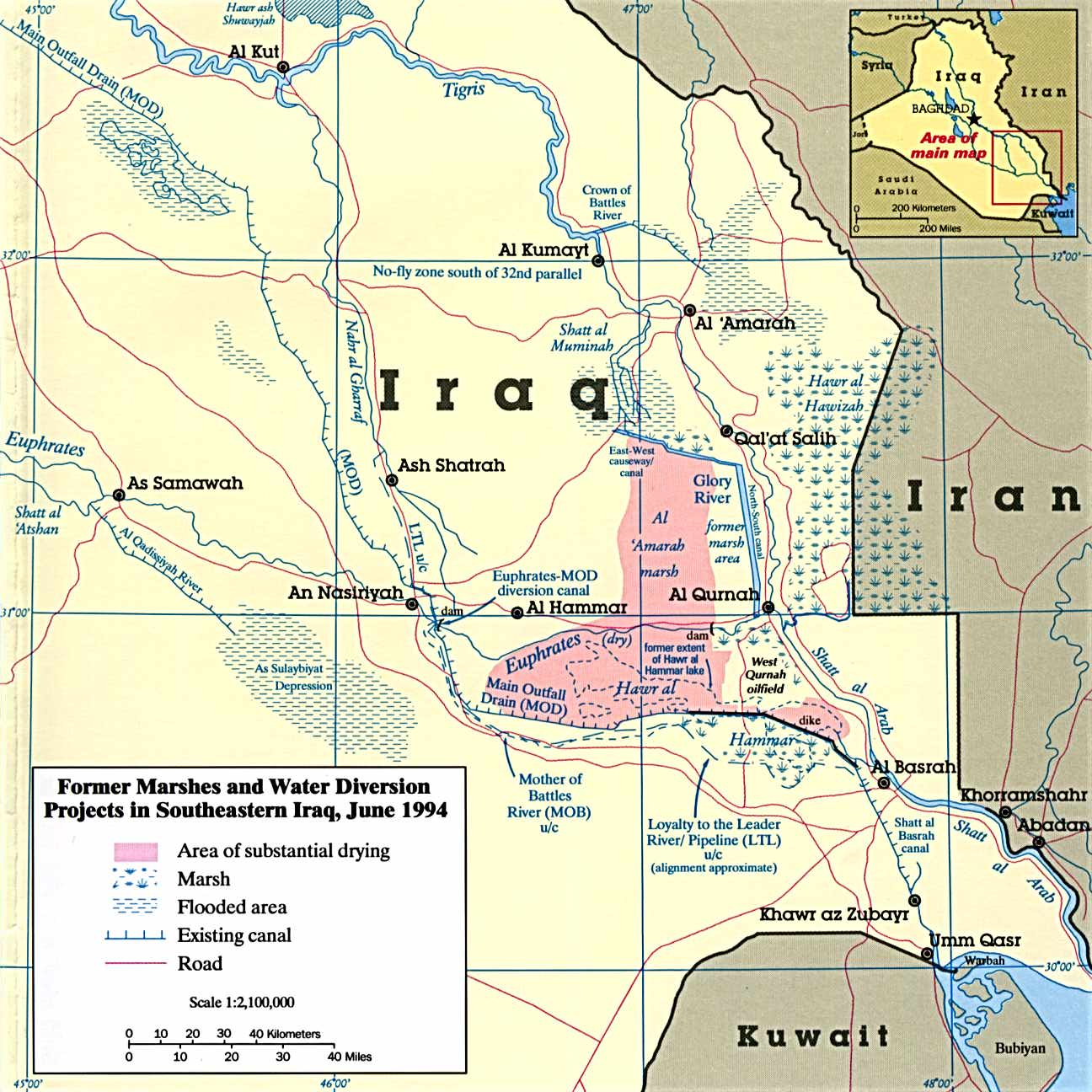
- 1994 Map of The Mesopotamian Marshes with draining features

- Location within Iraq
- Location: Iraq
- Part of: Ahwar of Southern Iraq
- Criteria: Mixed: (iii)(v)(ix)(x)
- Reference: 1481-001
- Inscription: 2016 (40th Session)
- Area: 48,131 ha (185.83 sq mi)
- Buffer zone: 42,561 ha (164.33 sq mi)
- Coordinates: 31°33′44″N 47°39′28″E

Ramsar Wetland
- Official name: Hawizeh Marsh
- Designated: 17 October 2007
- Reference no.: 1718

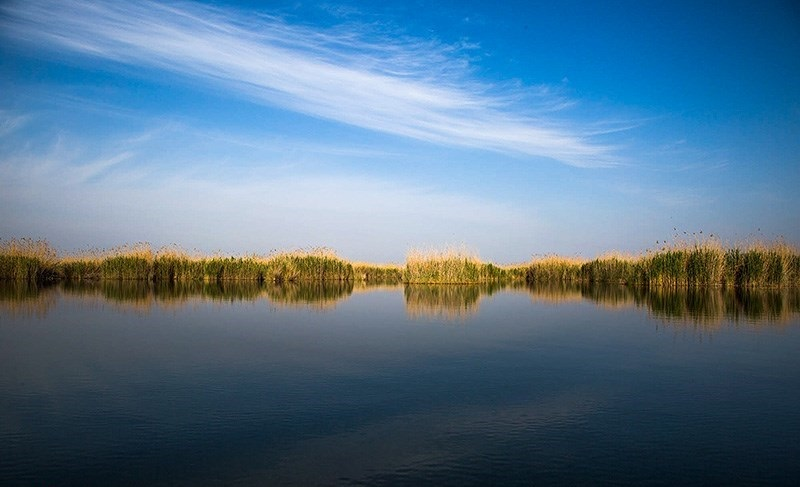
Picture of Hawizeh Marshes

The Hawizeh Marshes are a complex of marshes that straddle the Iran–Iraq border. The marshes are fed by two branches of the Tigris River (the Al-Musharrah and Al-Kahla) in Iraq and the Karkheh River in Iran. The Hawizeh marsh is critical to the survival of the Central and Hammar marshes also make up the Mesopotamian Marshes, because they are a refuge for species that may recolonize or reproduce in other marshlands. Hawizeh Marshes are drained by the Al-Kassarah. This river plays a critical role in maintaining the marshes as a flow-through system and preventing it from becoming a closed saline basin.

Hawizeh Marshes have been populated for more than 5,000 years. They are fed by the Tigris and Euphrates rivers in present-day Iraq and the Karkhen River in present-day Iran. The Marsh Arabs live in Iraq and Hawizeh people live in Iran. From the time of the Sumerians and Babylonians people lived in the marshes.

In the southwest of Iran and the southeast of Iraq, the Hawizeh and Hammar Marshes host many small cities. These cities in the marshes are part of both countries and no border separates them. The people travel in small canoe-like boats called Mashoof to move between Iraq and Iran. The marsh cities were built on water. The people who live there lead simple lives. They make houses out of reeds without electricity or cars, and generally have no education. The people fish, hunt, and cultivate buffalo.

The area where the fresh waters reaches the marshes is far from the cities. The marshes offer a safe home for thousands of migrating animals such as wild squirrels, white eagle, hawks, brown dukes and squirrels who raise their young there.

Around 3,000 BC, the marshes started at the confluence of the Tigris and Euphrates rivers. These rivers flooded the land, created the marshes and started a new ecosystem with new animals, birds, fish and plants. This affected Sumerians and Babylonians who lived there. They lived off the marshes by fishing, hunting and planting. People came to live in the marshes. Time changed some of the people’s ideas and beliefs. With the break between the Shia and Mandaean forms of religion, Shia came to dominate in the marshes.

Ideas from Islam mixed with ideas from Sumer. These ideas include fantastic stories about ghosts, curses and extraterrestrials. In 1990-1992 when the Hussein government decided to dry the marshes because they thought an armed group lived there, the population left. Some moved to the cities, while others moved to Iran. After the war in 2003, the Iraqi government reopened the flow, and the people returned to the marshes. Marshers number some 5,000.

== Challenges ==
According to media inside of Iran, the officials of the Ministry of Oil and other economic sectors of the government, along with the private sector, have decided to dry up this wetland by drilling 32 new oil wells. A water and environmental expert living in America says: "Currently, by drying a large part of this wetland due to exploration operations and the development of the oil field, serious damage has been done to the environment." He added that manipulating wetlands and drying them causes a large part of dust and fine-grained sediments to be moved with every strong wind. In addition to habitat degradation, recent reports indicate an increasing number of large birds, including pelicans, storks, and herons, dying after colliding with high-voltage powerlines crossing the wetland, raising concern among conservationists and local communities.

== See also ==
- Mesopotamian Marshes
- Tigris–Euphrates river system
- Marsh Arabs

== External source ==
- Management Plan for the Hawizeh Marsh Ramsar Site of Iraq, Second Draft Volume 1: Background, Vision, Principles and Annexes, A Report Prepared for the Iraq National Marshes and Wetlands Committee, December 2008 (Accessed June 2011)
