= Environmental issues in Iraq =

Environmental issues in Iraq are greatly attributed to the government, politics, and region. Iraq is the fifth most vulnerable country to the effects of climate change, subject to oil spills, pollution, land degradation, and poor management of upstream water sources.

== Issues ==
=== Oil spills ===
Numerous spills have resulted from damage to Iraq’s oil infrastructure, and the lack of water treatment facilities at Iraqi refineries has led to pollution from those installations. These environmentally catastrophic events have resulted in ecological degradation that negatively impact the Iraqi people. Recent development of oil production in the Kurdistan region of Iraq has affected soil and water quality, specifically in the Duhok Governorate. Dangerous spills have resulted from oil pipelines breaking down and the distribution of such oil products in the region.

=== Sanitation ===
Because of infrastructure damage, significant parts of the population do not have adequate water supply or sanitation systems. Rural areas are particularly affected. Children are twice as likely to drink untreated water in rural areas than urban.

=== Unexploded ordnance ===
Military operations in three wars (Iran–Iraq War, Gulf War, and Iraq War) have left unexploded ordnance and land mines in exposed positions, killing or wounding an estimated 100,000 people in the early 2000s. Ordnances are considered an environmental hazard due to their high concentrations of toxic metals.

=== Pollution ===
Sites where municipal and medical wastes have accumulated carry the risk of disease epidemics. The wartime destruction of military and industrial infrastructure has released heavy metals and other hazardous substances into the air, soil, and groundwater. This activity also causes sand to be broken down into dust particles which then negatively impacts the majority of the cities in Iraq in the form of dust storms.

In June 2003, a fire at the Al-Mishraq state run sulfur plant near Mosul burned for 3 weeks and was the largest human-made release of sulfur dioxide ever recorded.

As of 2017, Iraq was one of only 3 countries in the world with widespread use of leaded engine gasoline for automobiles, the others being Algeria and Yemen. Concerns over the toxicity of lead led to a ban on leaded automobile gasoline in most countries.

Ongoing oil well flaring has led to astronomical rates of cancer in Iraq, although little official research has come out on the rates. Oil pollution in soil samples is now being published in scientific publications.

=== Land degradation ===
In the alluvial plain, soil quality has been damaged by the deposit of large amounts of salts, borne by irrigation overflows and wind and promoted by poor soil drainage. Desertification and erosion also have reduced arable land.

Another source of significant land degradation and ecological changes in Iraq are dams situated on the Tigris and Euphrates rivers. These dams lead to low water levels, sediment buildup, erosion, and harm to local fisheries. Even more, Iraqi water infrastructure is outdated, which results in a large portion of the water being lost to inefficiency and waste.

=== River basins ===
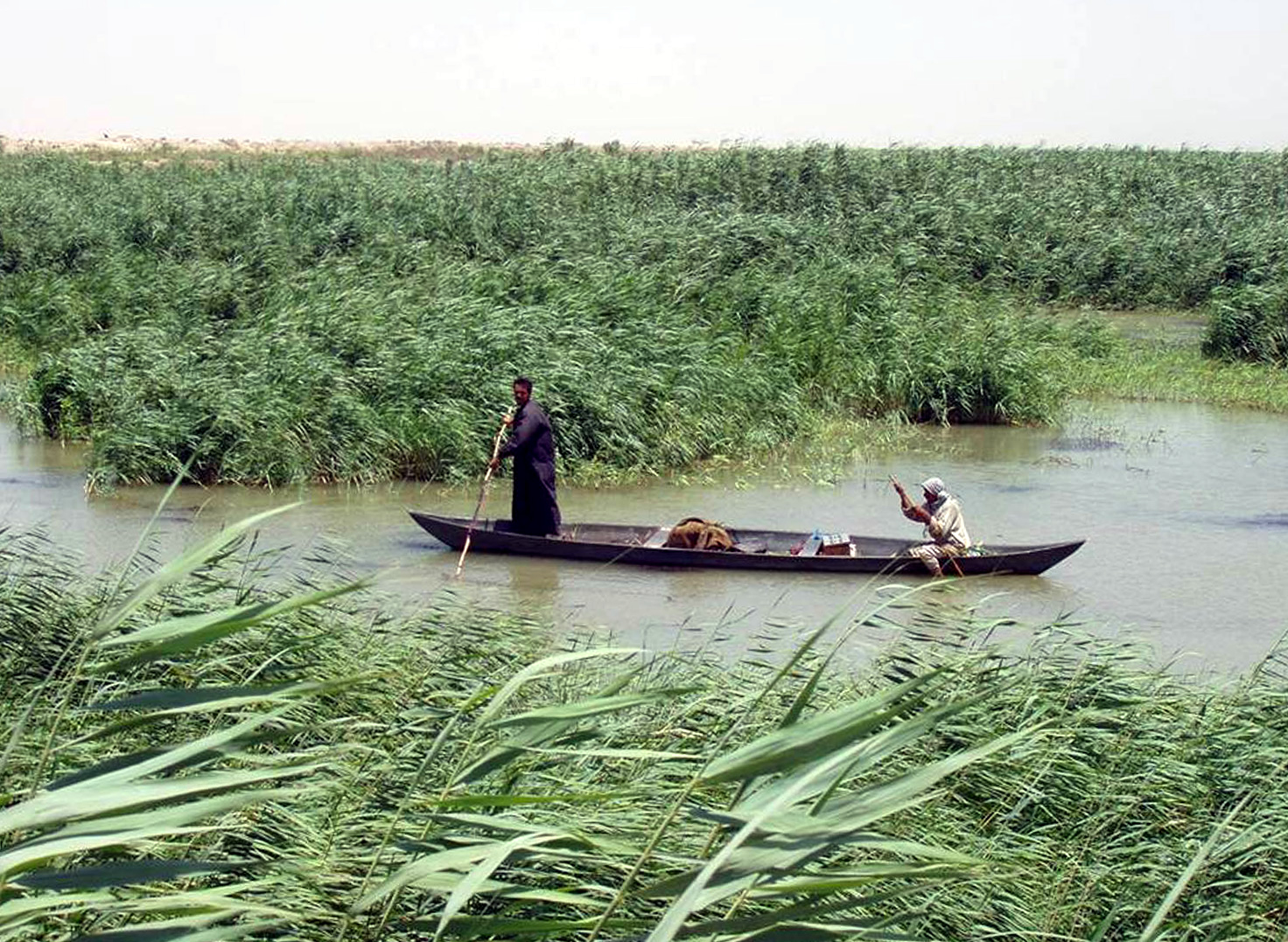
Marsh Arabs in the wetlands.

Transboundary pollution and a lack of river basin management by the government have led to the degradation of Iraq's major waterways. Under Saddam Hussein, the government constructed the Glory Canal which drained the extensive marshes in the lower reaches of the alluvial plain, changing water circulation and wildlife patterns over a wide area. Beginning in 2004, some restoration has occurred.

According to a 2001 United Nations Environmental Programme report, the projects resulted in:

- The loss of a migration area for birds migrating from Eurasia to Africa, and consequent decrease in bird populations in areas such as Ukraine and the Caucasus.
- Probable extinction of several plant and animal species endemic to the Marshes.
- Higher soil salinity in the Marshes and adjacent areas, resulting in loss of dairy production, fishing, and rice cultivation.
- Desertification of over 7,500 square miles (19,000 km^{2}).
- Saltwater intrusion and increased flow of pollutants into the Shatt-al-Arab waterway, causing disruption of fisheries in the Persian Gulf.

There now exists several projects to restore the marshes and return the Ahwari people to the lands.

== Government response ==
Although the interim government appointed in 2004 included a Ministry of Environment, long-term environmental crises such as the depletion of marshland in the Shatt al Arab have a low priority. The government has made numerous efforts to help the environment and the people of Iraq.

== See also ==
- Nature Iraq, Iraq's first and only conservation group
- Humat Dijla, an Iraqi association that works for a better awareness about the water problem in Iraq.
- Green Prophet, covers environmental issues in Iraq
