= Mudhif =

Ahwari traditional reed house

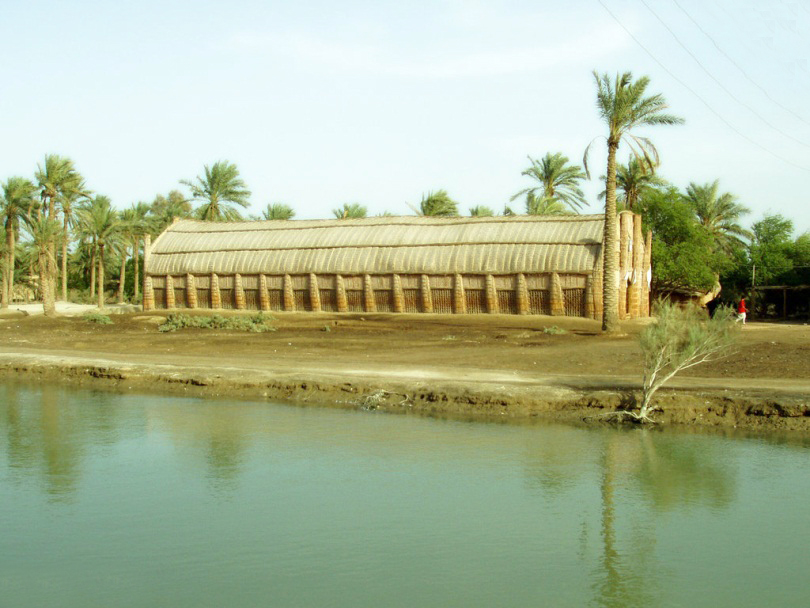
Modhif at Neserya

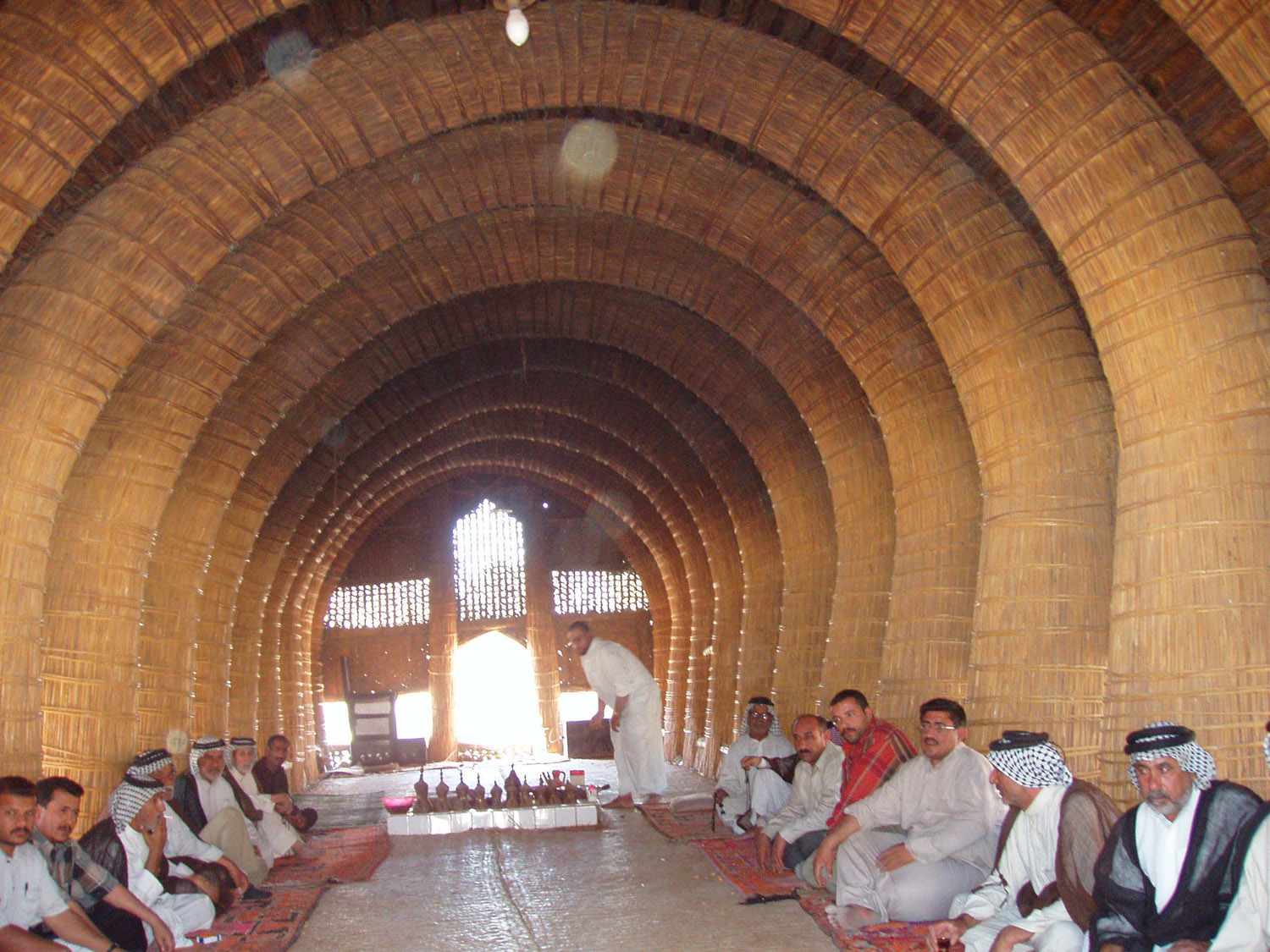
The interior of an Iraqi mudhif

A Mudhif /muˈdiːf/ (Arabic: المضيف al-muḍīf) is a traditional reed house made by the Ahwari people (also known as Marsh Arabs) in the swamps of southern Iraq. In the traditional Ahwari way of living, houses are constructed from reeds harvested from the marshes where they live. A mudhif is a large ceremonial house, paid for and maintained by a local sheik, for use by guests or as a gathering place for weddings, funerals, etc.

== Description ==
Mudhif structures have been one of the traditional types of structures built by those inhabiting the marshlands in southern Iraq for at least 5,000 years. A carved elevation of a typical mudhif, dating to around 3,300 BCE was discovered at Uruk, and is now in the British Museum.

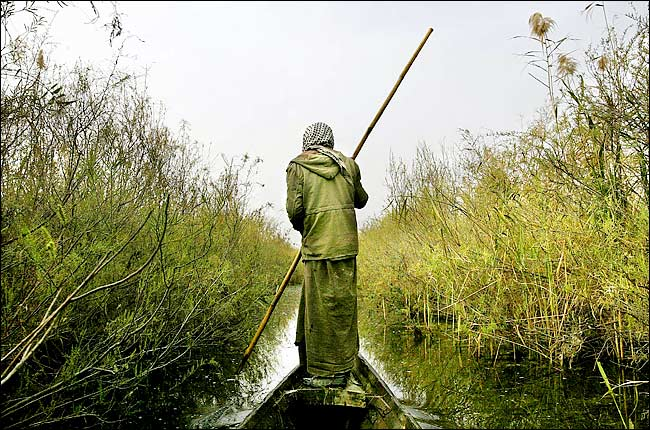
Marsh Arab amid the reeds used for building

A mudhif is a special type of sarifa; a structure made from reeds which grow naturally in the marshlands and is used by the village sheik as a guest-house. Other types of reed dwelling, such as a raba (with entrances at both ends and used as a family dwelling) or a bayt (strictly a single-room dwelling) are typically smaller than a mudhif and may be used for residential and other purposes.

Each village sheik had a mudhif capable of accommodating at least ten persons. The number of arches used in a mudhif is dictated by the tribe and family group. Sometimes the mudhif was decorated with additional bundles of reeds, arranged in decorative patterns, placed on the façade, to serve as a tribal identifier. The entrance to the mudhif always faces Mecca.

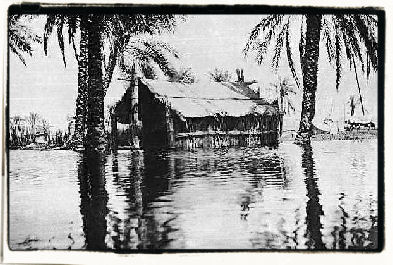
Mudhif, photograph by Gertrude Bell, 1918 or 1920.

The English writer, Gertrude Bell, wrote a description of a mudhif in a letter to her father:

"After dinner Sheik Ibadi al Husain invited us to his mudhif, his guest house. Now a mudhif you can't picture until you have seen it. It is constructed of reeds, reed mats spread over reed bundles, arching over and meeting at the top, so that the whole is a perfectly regular and exquisitely constructed yellow tunnel, 50 yards long. In the middle is a coffee hearth, with great logs of willow burning. On either side of the hearth, against the reed walls of the mudhif, a row of brocaded cushions for us to sit on, the Arabs flanking us and the coffee-maker crouched over his pots. The whole lighted by fire and a couple of small lamps, and the end of the mudhif fading away into a golden gloom. Glorious.

== Construction ==
In the construction of a mudhif, reeds are bundled and woven into thick columns; larger and thicker reeds are bent across and tied to form parabolic arches which make up the building's spine. These arches are strengthened by the pre-stressing of the columns, as they are initially inserted into the soil at opposing angles. A series of arches define the building's form. Long cross beams of smaller bundled reeds are laid across the arches and tied. Woven mats of reeds form the building envelope. Some of the mats are woven with perforations like a mesh to allow light and ventilation.

The front and back walls are attached to two large vertical bundled reed columns and are also made from woven mats. Mudhif need to be rebuilt every ten years.

=== Reeds as a construction material ===
The most common type of reed used for the construction of marshland mudhif is ihdri. Reed has properties which make it an ideal building material – it has a high concentration of silica which makes it water resistant, unattractive for insects and other pests and an excellent thermal and acoustic insulating material. It is an inexpensive material and it is both flexible and durable as a construction material, which encourages creativity.

== Use ==
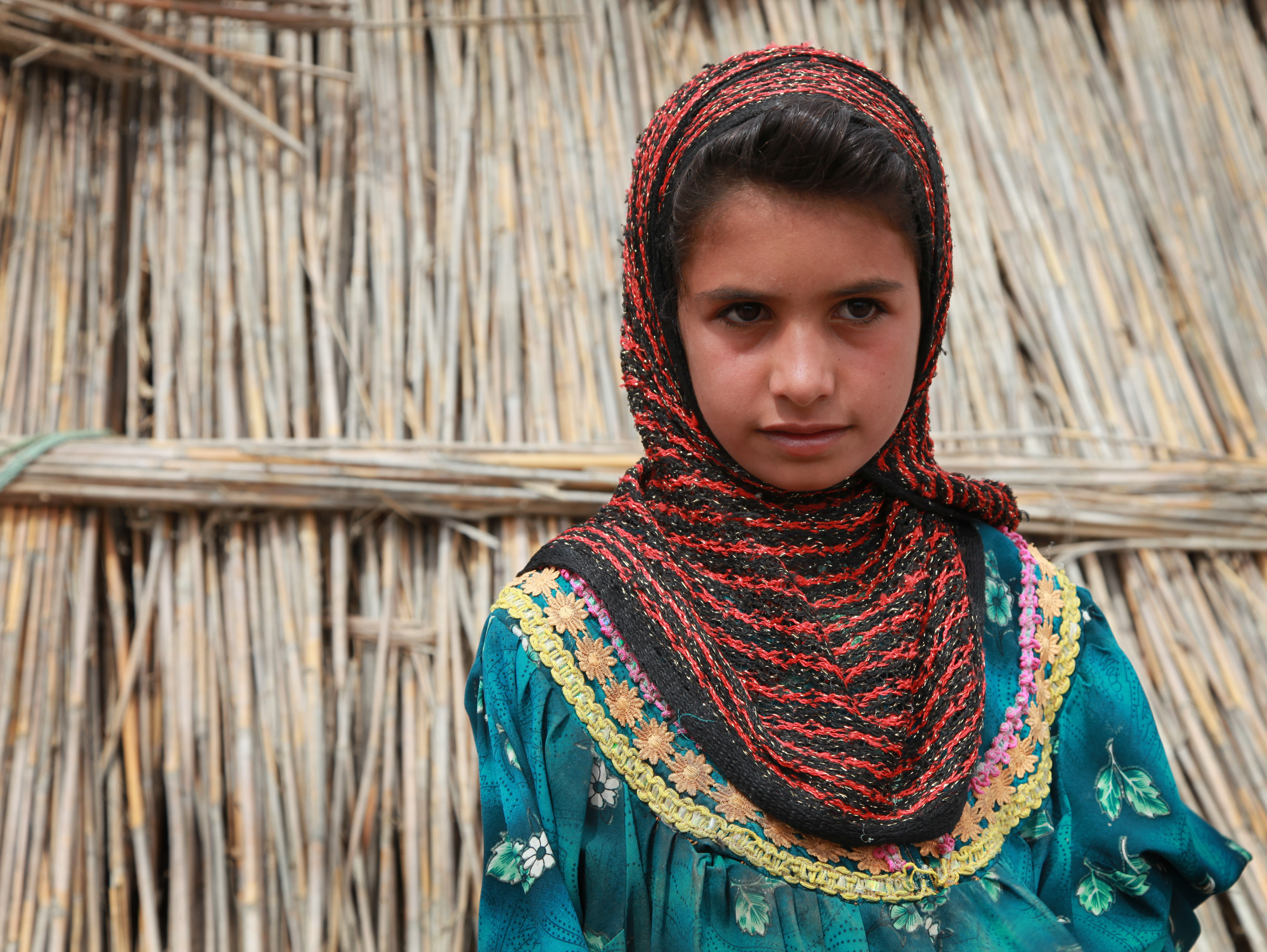
A Marsh Arab girl from Al Kuthra, Iraq, standing in front of a reed dwelling

A mudhif is used as a guest house or for ceremonial occasions, and may not be used for any other purpose. When a guest enters a mudhif, he or she will be welcomed by the village sheik, escorted to their proper place and offered refreshments such as highly sweetened coffee in a ritualised ceremony.

== Recent developments ==
In the 1980s, some half a million Arabs lived in the marshes. However, from around 1993, Saddam Hussein began to drain the marshes in an attempt to destroy the life and culture of the southern Arabs. Following Hussein's defeat in 2003, Arab communities began to dig up the dykes, re-flooding the marshes and resuming their traditional way of life.

== See also ==
- Culture of Iraq
- Draining of the Mesopotamian Marshes
- Iraqi art
- Vernacular architecture
