= Tigris–Euphrates river system =

River system in the Middle East

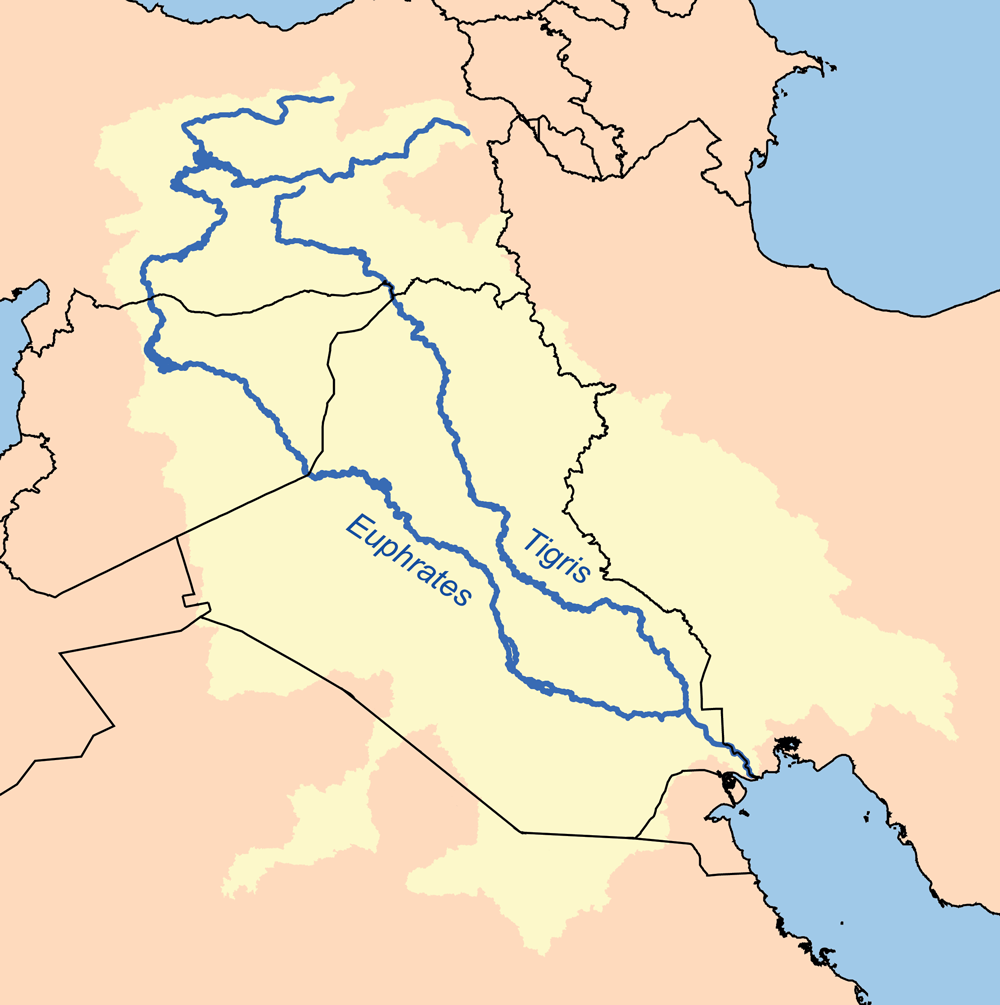

Ecology
- Realm: Palearctic
- Biome: Temperate floodplain rivers and wetlands

Geography
- Area: 879,790 km^{2} (339,690 mi^{2})
- Countries: List: Turkey; Syria; Iraq; Iran; Kuwait
- Oceans or seas: Empties into the Persian Gulf
- Rivers: Tigris, Euphrates, Greater Zab, Lesser Zab.

The Tigris–Euphrates river system is a large river system in West Asia that flows into the Persian Gulf. Its primary rivers are the Tigris and Euphrates, along with smaller tributaries.

From their sources and upper courses in eastern Turkey, being Lake Hazar for the Tigris and Karasu along with the Murat River for the Euphrates, the two rivers descend through valleys and gorges to the uplands of Syria and northern Iraq and then to the alluvial plain of central Iraq. Other tributaries join the Tigris from sources in the Zagros Mountains to the east. The rivers flow in a south-easterly direction through the central plain and combine at Al-Qurnah to form the Shatt al-Arab and discharge into the Persian Gulf. The rivers and their tributaries drain an area of 879,790 square kilometres (339,690 sq mi), including almost the entire area of Iraq as well as portions of Turkey, Syria, Iran and Kuwait.

The region has historical importance as part of the Fertile Crescent, where Mesopotamian civilization first emerged.

== Geography ==
The Tigris–Euphrates Basin is shared between Turkey, Syria, Iraq, Iran, and Kuwait. Many tributaries of the Tigris river originate in Iran, and the Shatt al-Arab, formed by the confluence of the Euphrates and Tigris rivers, makes up a portion of the Iran–Iraq border, with Kuwait's Bubiyan Island being part of its delta. Since the 1960s and in the 1970s, when Turkey began the GAP project in earnest, water disputes have regularly occurred in addition to the associated dam's effects on the environment. In addition, Syrian and Iranian dam construction has also contributed to political tension within the basin, particularly during drought.

The ecoregion is characterized by two large rivers, the Tigris and Euphrates. The high mountains in the upper watershed receive more rain and snow than the lower watershed, which has a hot and arid subtropical climate. Annual snow melt from the mountains brings spring floods, and sustains permanent and seasonal marshes in the lowlands.

The plain between the two rivers is known as Mesopotamia. As part of the larger Fertile Crescent, it saw the earliest emergence of literate urban civilization in the Uruk period. For this reason, it is often described as a "Cradle of Civilization".

There is a large floodplain in the lower basin where the Euphrates, Tigris, and Karun rivers converge to create the Mesopotamian Marshes, which include permanent lakes, marshes, and riparian forests. The hydrology of these vast marshes is extremely important to the ecology of the entire top part of the Persian Gulf.

== History ==
Some of the first civilizations emerged from the confluence of the Tigris and Euphrates rivers. From ancient times empires arose and fell in the river basin, including Sumer, Akkad, Babylonia, Ur, and Assyria. Being part of the Fertile Crescent, the river system is recognized as the site of one of the world's first agricultural centers, with archeological sites containing preserved grain dating up to 12,500 years ago. The river system was used by major cities including Ur and Babylon to promote trade and the sharing of cultures. As a result of its invention of the qanat system thousands of years ago which uses gravity to transport water through subterranean tunnels, Iran has a history as an agricultural nation, despite its aridity.

== Ecology ==
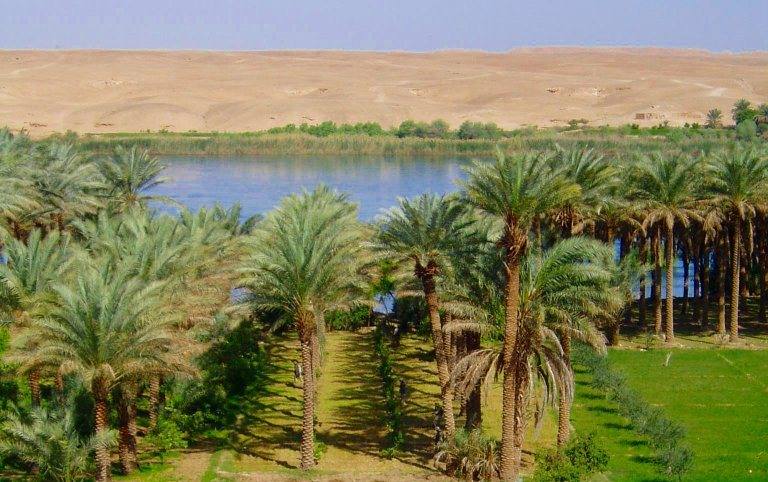
Palm orchard in the lower Euphrates valley

The most abundant fishes are species of barbs (Barbus), some of which can reach up to two meters in length. Some species have been important food sources for residents for thousands of years. Specifically, the mangar fish has been harvested for food in the Tigris-Euphrates basin. Many species move seasonally between the river and the marshes for spawning, feeding, and overwintering. The hilsa shad (Tenualosa ilisha) is an important food fish that lives in the coastal waters and spawns in the lower reaches of the basin. Other ocean species occasionally visit the lower reaches of the rivers; bull sharks (Carcharhinus leucas) used to swim up the Tigris as far as Baghdad.

Endemic fish species in the lower basin include Glyptothorax steindachneri and Garra elegans, as well as two cave fishes, Caecocypris basimi and the Iraq blind barb (Garra widdowsoni), from a cave habitat near Haditha on the Euphrates.

One-third of the fish species in the upper watersheds are endemic, including species of Aphanius, Glyptothorax, Cobitis, Orthrias, and Schistura. Two blind fish species, the Iran cave barb (Garra typhlops) and the Zagros blind loach (Eidinemacheilus smithi), are endemic to cave systems in Iran's upper Karun River watershed. The Batman River loach (Paraschistura chrysicristinae) is a Critically Endangered fish species endemic to the Batman and Ambar rivers, Turkish tributaries of the Tigris. The species is endangered by drought, habitat destruction, and habitat fragmentation from the construction of the Batman Dam. It had not been observed since 1974 and was feared extinct until a 2021 expedition netted 14 fish living above the Batman Dam.

=== Mesopotamian Marshes ===
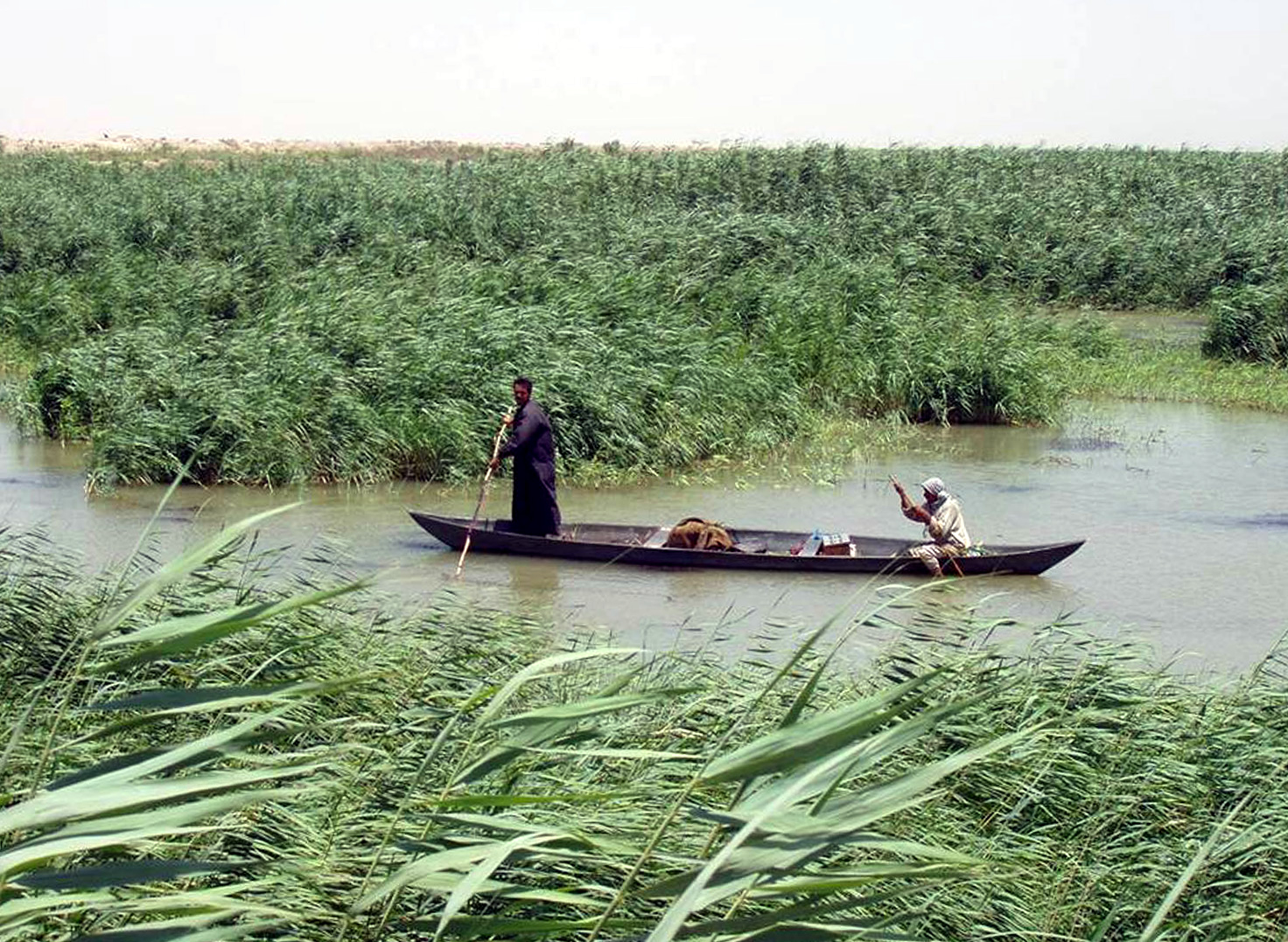
Marsh Arabs poling a mashoof in the marshes of southern Iraq

The Mesopotamian Marshes in southern Iraq were historically the largest wetland ecosystem of Western Eurasia. The aquatic vegetation includes reeds, rushes, and papyrus, which support numerous species. Areas around the Tigris and the Euphrates are very fertile. Marshy land is home to water birds, some stopping here while migrating, and some spending the winter in these marshes living off the lizards, snakes, frogs, and fish. Other animals found in these marshes are water buffalo, two endemic rodent species, antelopes and gazelles and small animals such as the jerboa and several other mammals. The wetland birds Basra reed warbler (Acrocephalus griseldis) and Iraq babbler (Argya altirostris) are native to the Mesopotamian Marshes. The Basra reed warbler is endangered. Another wetland endemic species, Bunn's short-tailed bandicoot rat (Nesokia bunnii), is possibly extinct.

Their drainage began in the 1950s, to reclaim land for agriculture and oil exploration. Saddam Hussein extended this work in the late 1980s and early 1990s, as part of ecological warfare against the Marsh Arabs, a rebellious group of people in Baathist Iraq. However, with the breaching of the dikes by local communities after the 2003 invasion of Iraq and the ending of a four-year drought that same year, the process has been reversed and the marshes have experienced a substantial rate of recovery. The permanent wetlands now cover more than 50% of pre-1970s levels, with a remarkable regrowth of the Hammar and Hawizeh Marshes and some recovery of the Central Marshes.

== Ecological threats ==
This visualization shows variations in total water storage from normal, in millimeters, in the Tigris and Euphrates river basins, from January 2003 through December 2009. Reds represent drier conditions, while blues represent wetter conditions. The effects of the seasons are evident, as is the major drought that hit the region in 2007. The majority of the water lost was due to reductions in groundwater caused by human activities.

Iraq suffers from desertification and soil salination due in large part to thousands of years of agricultural activity. Water and plant life are sparse. Saddam Hussein's government water-control projects drained the inhabited marsh areas east of An Nasiriyah by drying up or diverting streams and rivers. Shi'a Muslims were displaced under the Ba'athist regime. The destruction of the natural habitat poses serious threats to the area's wildlife populations. There are also inadequate supplies of potable water.

The marshlands were an extensive natural wetland ecosystem, which developed over thousands of years in the Tigris–Euphrates basin and once covered 15–20,000 square kilometers. In the 1980s, this ecoregion was put in grave danger during the Iran–Iraq War. After the 1991 Gulf War, Iraq's President Saddam Hussein initiated a drainage project on these marshes, leading to degradation of ecosystem services that caused economic and social issues for civilians. The Mesopotamian Marshes, which were inhabited by the Marsh Arabs, were almost completely drained. Although they had started to recover after the fall of Ba'athist Iraq in 2003, drought, intensive dam construction and irrigation schemes upstream have caused them to dry up once more. According to the United Nations Environmental Program and the AMAR Charitable Foundation, between 84% and 90% of the marshes have been destroyed since the 1970s. In 1994, 60 percent of the wetlands were destroyed by Hussein's regime – drained to permit military access and greater political control of the native Marsh Arabs. Canals, dykes and dams were built routing the water of the Tigris and Euphrates Rivers around the marshes, instead of allowing water to move slowly through the marshland. After part of the Euphrates was dried up due to re-routing its water to the sea, a dam was built so water could not back up from the Tigris and sustain the former marshland. Some marshlands were burned and pipes buried underground helped to carry away water for quicker drying.

Riparian entities have constructed dams along the Tigris–Euphrates river system as a method of water management in response to droughts. Turkey, for example, is in control of an estimated 45% of the system's water sources due to its dam constructions for water quantity and hydroelectric power.

The drying of the marshes led to the disappearance of the salt-tolerant vegetation; the plankton rich waters that fertilized surrounding soils; 52 native fish species; the wild boar, red fox, buffalo and water birds of the marsh habitat.

Climate change also affects the environmental and social well-being. Climate change and human interaction have directly impacted the Tigris–Euphrates river system, leading to a negative trend in water storage capabilities in the river basin. The combination of diminishing water levels in the Tigris–Euphrates river system and rising sea levels indicates the potential for rapid seawater intrusion in the river basin. This is especially concerning as the demand for clean water increases while the water supply decreases. Currently, West Asia and North Africa are acknowledged as the most water scarce region in the world, with 61% of the population living in areas with high or very high water stress. As climate change worsens and population grows, water scarcity in the region is expected to worsen with 100% of people living in West Asia and North Africa living in areas with high water stress by 2050.

== Water dispute ==
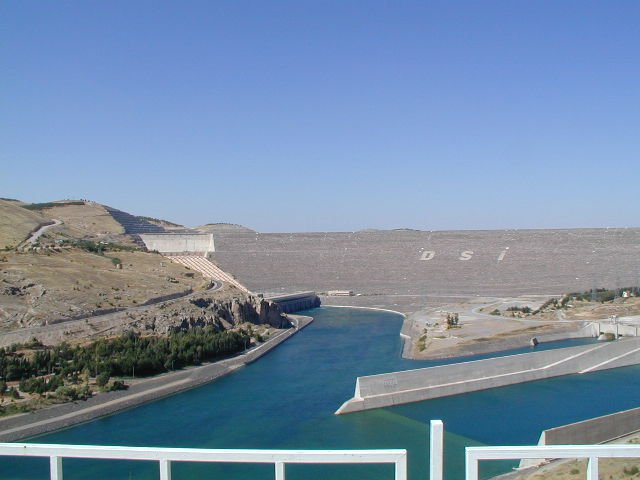
The Atatürk Dam along the Euphrates River

The issue of water rights became a point of contention for Iraq, Turkey and Syria beginning in the 1960s when Turkey implemented a public-works project (the GAP project) aimed at harvesting the water from the Tigris and Euphrates rivers through the construction of 22 dams, for irrigation and hydroelectric energy purposes. Although the water dispute between Turkey and Syria was more problematic, the GAP project was also perceived as a threat by Iraq. In 1983, the Joint Technical Committee (JTC) was established to solve ongoing data controversies between Turkey, Syria, and Iraq but stopped meeting in the early 1990s after only passing two bilateral agreements. The tension between Turkey and Iraq about the issue was increased by the effect of Syria and Turkey's participation in the UN embargo against Iraq following the Gulf War. However, the issue had never become as significant as the water dispute between Turkey and Syria.

The 2008 drought in Iraq sparked new negotiations between Iraq and Turkey over trans-boundary river flows. Although the drought affected Turkey, Syria and Iran as well, Iraq complained regularly about reduced water flows. Iraq particularly complained about the Euphrates River because of the large number of dams on the river. Turkey agreed to increase the flow several times, beyond its means in order to supply Iraq with water. Iraq has seen significant declines in water storage and crop yields because of the drought. To make matters worse, Iraq's water infrastructure has suffered from years of conflict and neglect.

In 2008, Turkey, Iraq and Syria agreed to restart the Joint Trilateral Committee on water for the three nations for better water resources management. Turkey, Iraq and Syria signed a memorandum of understanding on September 3, 2009, in order to strengthen communication within the Tigris–Euphrates Basin and to develop joint water-flow-monitoring stations. On September 19, 2009, Turkey formally agreed to increase the flow of the Euphrates River to 450 to 500 m^{3}/s, but only until October 20, 2009. In exchange, Iraq agreed to trade petroleum with Turkey and help curb Kurdish militant activity in their border region. One of Turkey's last large GAP dams on the Tigris – the Ilisu Dam – is strongly opposed by Iraq and is the source of political strife. The Southeastern Anatolia Project (Turkish acronym: GAP) continues to be a source of tension in the region. GAP is a massive hydroelectric project, consisting of 21 dams and 19 hydroelectric facilities. In 2020, Iraqi authorities complained that the Ilısu Dam had decreased the Tigris river inflows and caused water shortages in Iraqi plains.

== In media ==
- Dawn of the World, film, 2008.
- Zaman, The Man From The Reeds, film, 2003

== See also ==
- Armenian highlands
  - Mountains of Ararat
- Soil salinity
- Mesopotamian Marshes
- Shatt al-Arab
- Taurus Mountains
