= Bunn's short-tailed bandicoot rat =

Conservation status
- Endangered (IUCN 3.1)

Scientific classification
- Kingdom: Animalia
- Phylum: Chordata
- Class: Mammalia
- Order: Rodentia
- Family: Muridae
- Genus: Nesokia
- Species: N. bunnii

Binomial name
- Nesokia bunnii (Khajuria, 1981)

Species of rodent

Bunn's short-tailed bandicoot rat (Nesokia bunnii) is a species of rodent in the family Muridae. It is found only in the marshes of southeastern Iraq and is named for the Iraqi zoologist Dr. Munir K. Bunni. It is feared that the species might have gone extinct due to the draining of the Mesopotamian Marshes.

In an Old Babylonian period cuneiform tablet from Tell Abu Antiq (bandicoot here refers to the Bunn's short-tailed bandicoot rat):

"... From Tur-Ugalla 7 bandicoots did Tutu-māgir send me; 6 to Šamaš-lamassašu, the ‘mirror-holder,’ I sent on; just one for my own repast I kept back, and it tasted excellent! How good they were had I but known, a single one to Šamaš-lamassašu I’d not have sent! ..."
