= Tigris =

River in Turkey, Iraq, and Syria

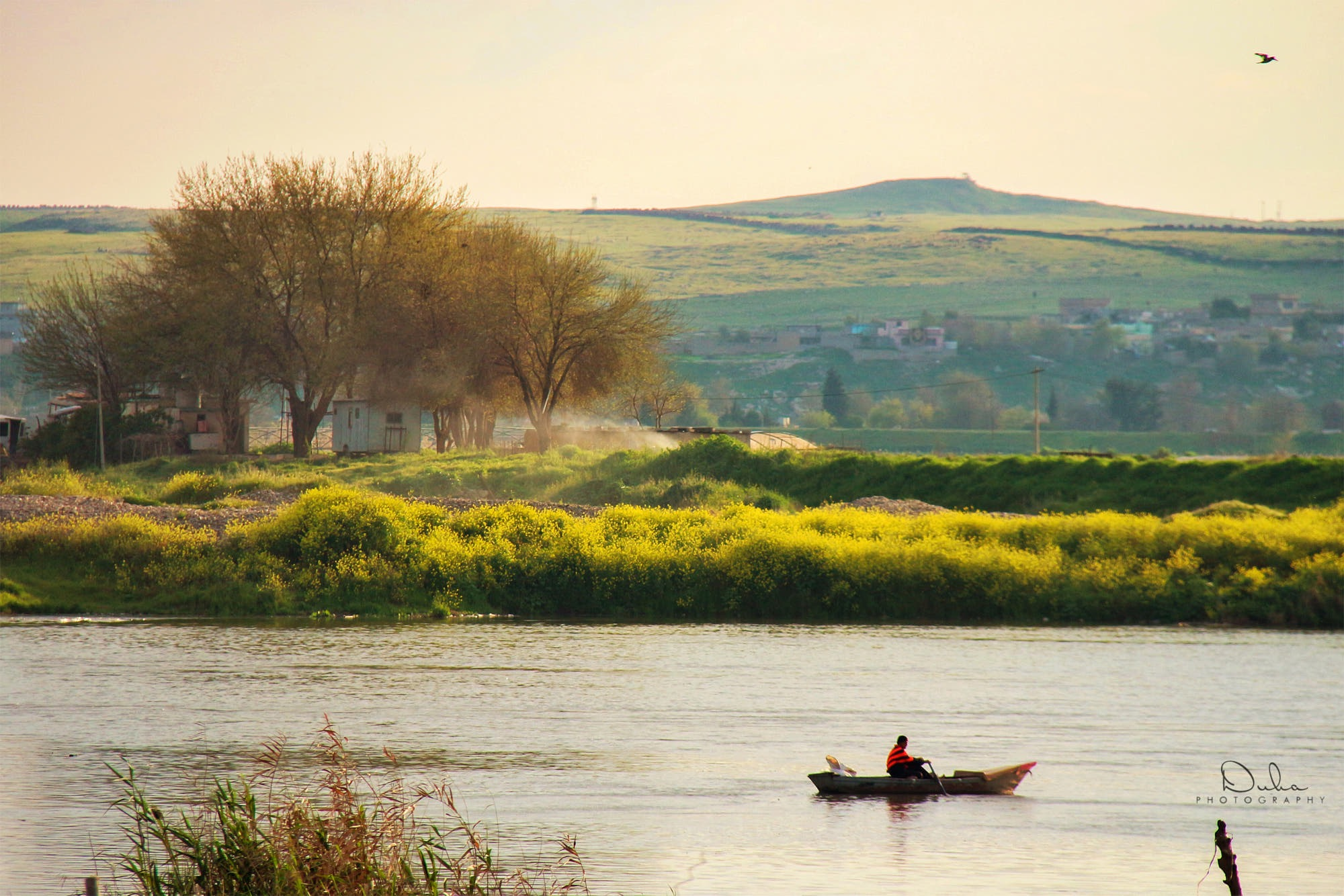
- Tigris river in Mosul in 2015

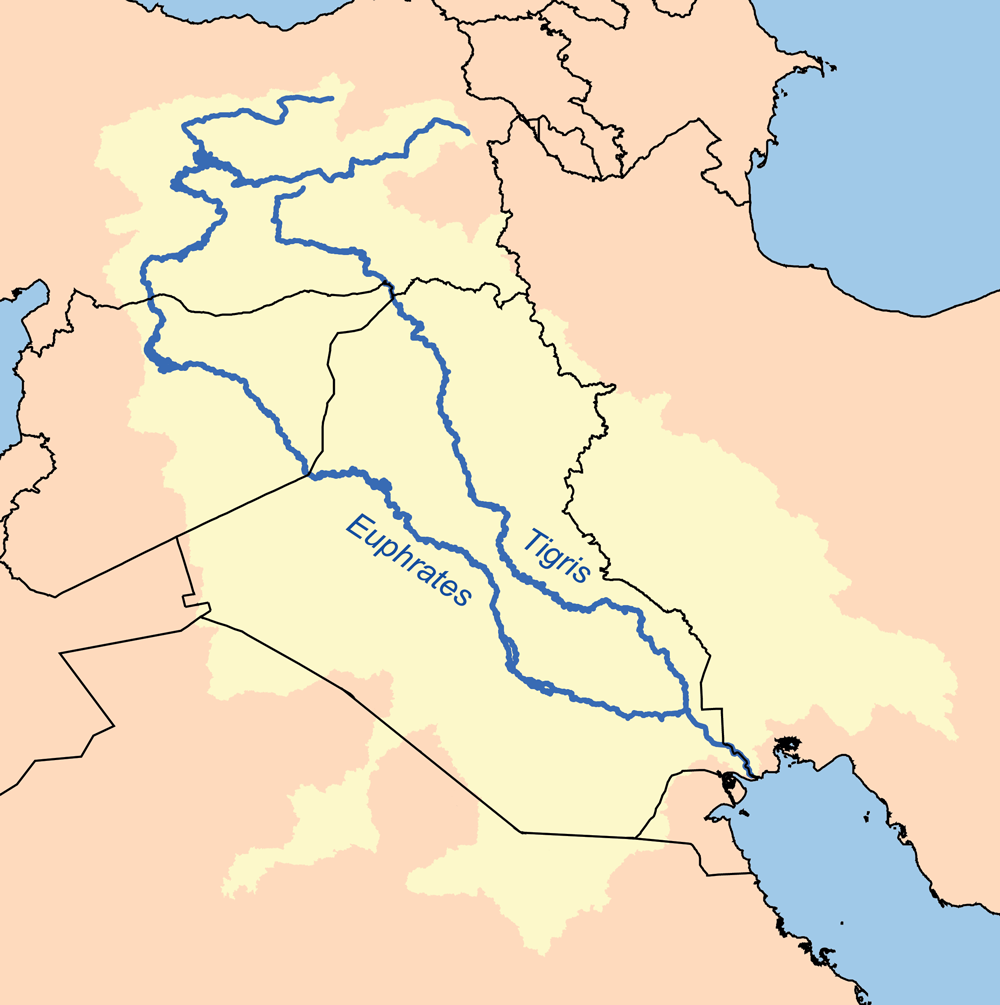
- Map of the Tigris–Euphrates river system

Location
- Country: Turkey, Syria, Iraq
- Source region: Armenian Highlands
- Cities: Elazığ, Diyarbakır, Mosul, Baghdad

Physical characteristics
- Source: Lake Hazar
  - location: Gölardı, Turkey
  - coordinates: 38°29′0″N 39°25′0″E
  - elevation: 1,150 m (3,770 ft)
- Mouth: Shatt al-Arab
  - location: Al-Qurnah, Iraq
  - coordinates: 31°0′18″N 47°26′31″E
  - elevation: 1 m (3.3 ft)
- Length: 1,900 km (1,200 mi)
- Basin size: 375,000 km^{2} (145,000 sq mi)
- Discharge
  - location: Baghdad
  - average: 1,014 m^{3}/s (35,800 cu ft/s)
  - minimum: 337 m^{3}/s (11,900 cu ft/s)
  - maximum: 2,779 m^{3}/s (98,100 cu ft/s)

Basin features
- Progression: Shatt al-Arab → Persian Gulf
- River system: Tigris–Euphrates river system
- Tributaries
  - left: Garzan, Botan, Khabur, Greater Zab, Lesser Zab, 'Adhaim, Cizre, Diyala
  - right: Wadi Tharthar

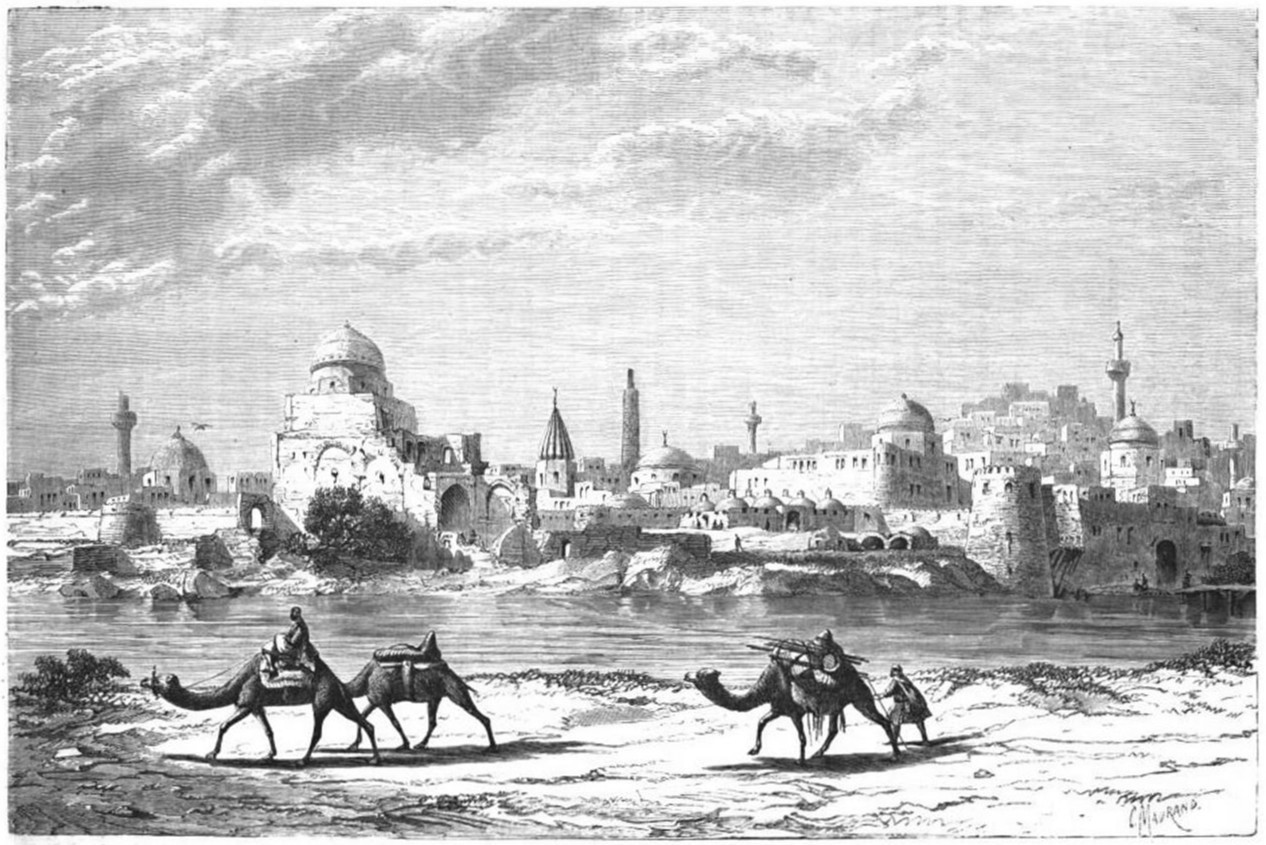
Mosul, on the bank of the Tigris, 1861

The Tigris (/ˈtaɪɡrɪs/ TY-griss; see below) is the eastern of the two great rivers that define Mesopotamia, the other being the Euphrates. The river flows south from the mountains of the Armenian Highlands through the Syrian and Arabian Deserts, before merging with the Euphrates and reaching to the Persian Gulf.

The Tigris passes through historical cities such as Mosul, Tikrit, Samarra and Baghdad. It is also home to archaeological sites and ancient religious communities, including the Mandaeans, who use it for baptism. In ancient times the Tigris nurtured the Assyrian Empire, with remnants such as the relief of King Tiglath-Pileser.

Today, the Tigris faces modern threats from geopolitical instability, dam projects, poor water management, and climate change, raising concerns about its sustainability. Efforts to protect and preserve the river's legacy are ongoing, with local archaeologists and activists working to safeguard its future.

== Etymology ==
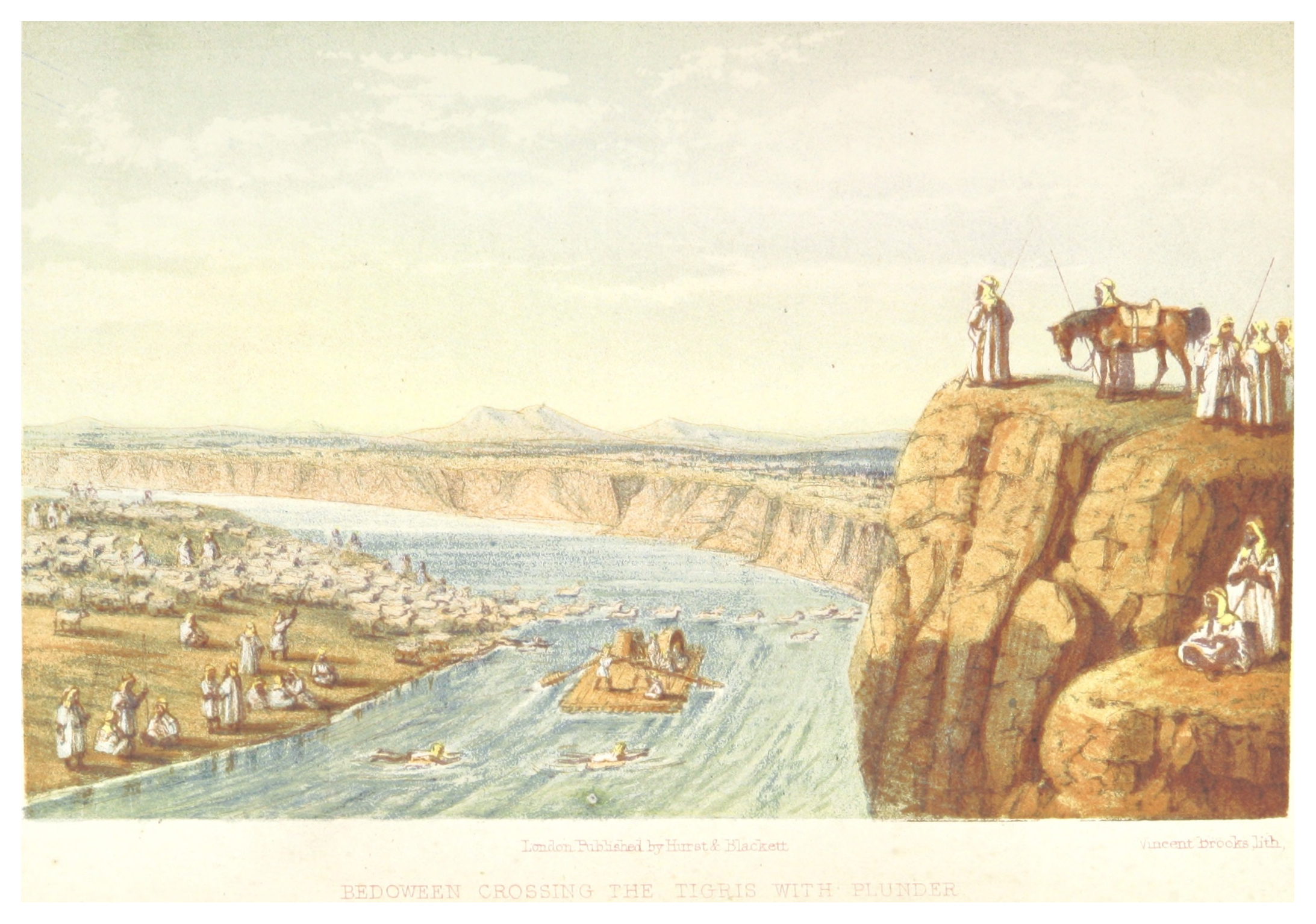
Bedouin crossing the river Tigris with plunder (c. 1860)

From Latin Tigris, from Ancient Greek Τίγρις (Tígris), an alternative form of Τίγρης (Tígrēs), from Old Persian 𐎫𐎡𐎥𐎼𐎠 (Tigrā), from Akkadian 𒀀𒇉𒈦𒄘𒃼 (Idiglat), from Sumerian 𒀀𒇉𒈦𒄘𒃼 (Idigna).

The Ancient Greek form Tigris (Τίγρις) probably derived from *id (i)gina "running water"). The Sumerian term, which can be interpreted as "the swift river", contrasts the Tigris to its neighbour, the Euphrates, the leisurely pace of which caused it to deposit more silt and build up a higher bed than the Tigris. The Sumerian form was borrowed into Akkadian as Idiqlat and from there into the other Semitic languages (compare Hebrew: חִדֶּקֶל, romanized: Ḥîddéqel; Jewish Babylonian Aramaic: דיגלת, דיקגלת, romanized: diqlāṯ or diglāṯ; Classical Syriac: ܕܩܠܬ, romanized: Deqlāṯ, Arabic: دِجلَة, romanized: Dijlah).

In Kurdish languages it is known as Ava Mezin, "the Great Water".

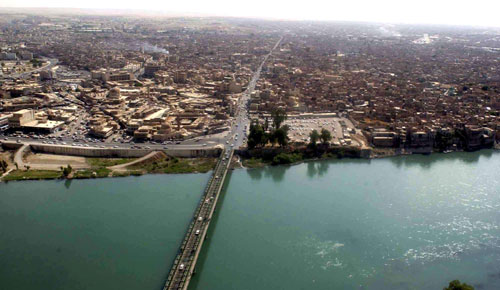
Mosul, Iraq

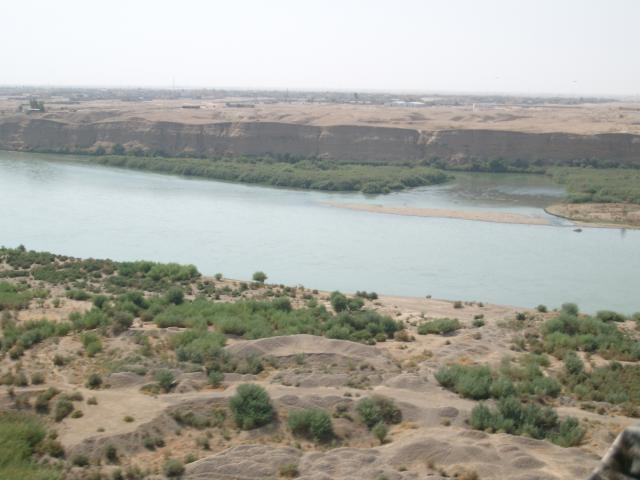
Outside of Mosul, Iraq

The name of the Tigris in languages that have been important in the region:

Language	Name for Tigris
Akkadian	𒁇𒄘𒃼, Idiqlat
Arabic	دِجلَة, Dijlah; حُدَاقِل, Ḥudāqil
Aramaic	דיגלת, Diglath
Armenian	Տիգրիս, Tigris, Դգլաթ, Dglatʿ
Greek	ἡ Τίγρης, -ητος, hē Tígrēs, -ētos; ἡ, ὁ Τίγρις, -ιδος, hē, ho Tígris, -idos
Hebrew	חִדֶּקֶל, Ḥiddéqel
Hurrian	Aranzah
Persian	Old Persian: 𐎫𐎡𐎥𐎼𐎠 Tigrā; Middle Persian: Tigr; Persian: دجله Dejle
Sumerian	𒁇𒄘𒃼 Idigna/Idigina
Syriac	ܕܸܩܠܵܬܼ Deqlaṯ
Turkish	Dicle
Kurdish	Dîcle, Dijlê, دیجلە

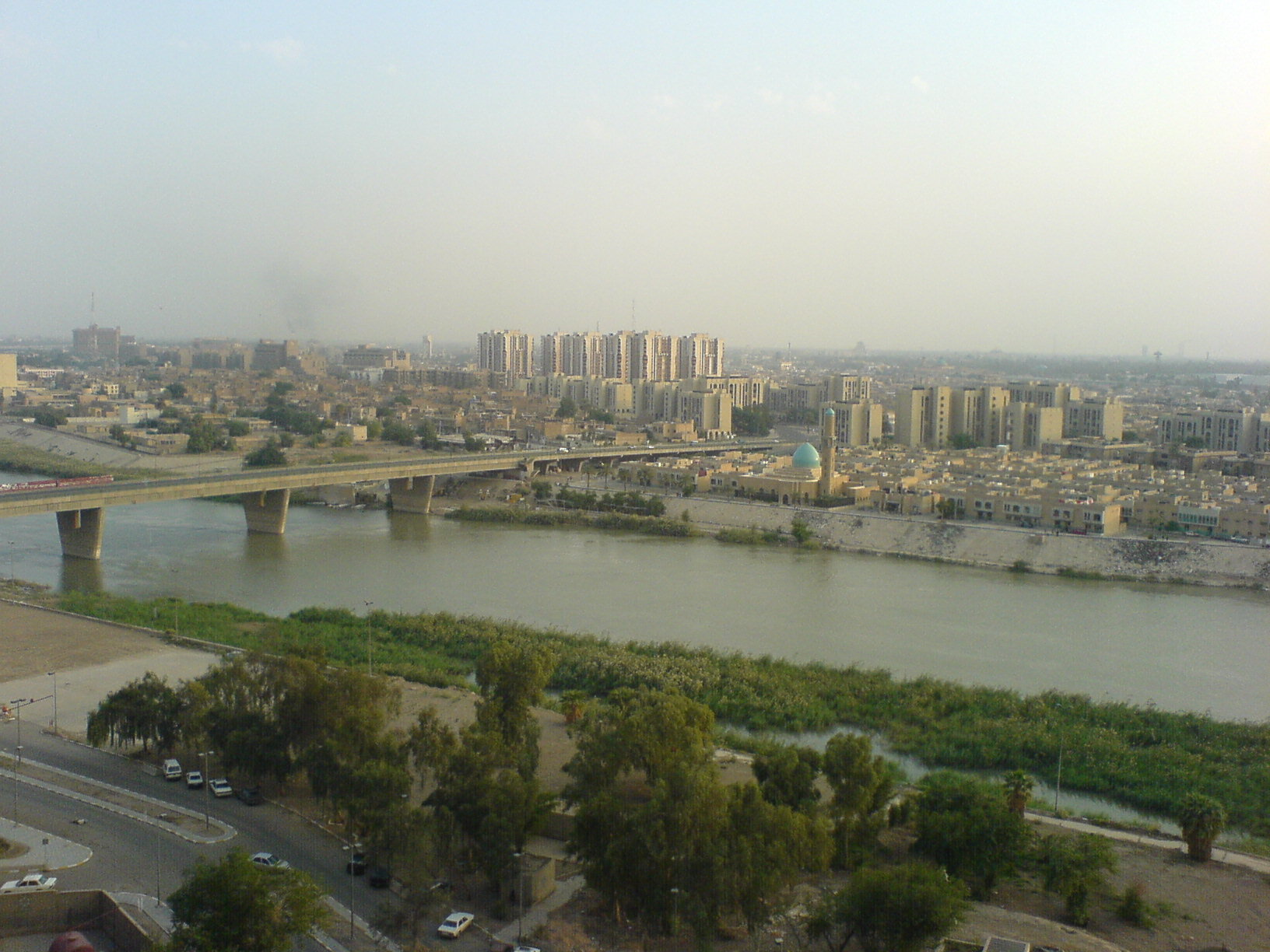
Baghdad

== Geography ==
The Tigris is 1,750 km (1,090 mi) long, rising in the Taurus Mountains of eastern Turkey about 25 km (16 mi) southeast of the city of Elazığ and about 30 km (19 mi) south of the valley of the Euphrates. The river then flows for 400 km (250 mi) through Southeastern Turkey before forming part of the Syria-Turkey border. This stretch of 44 km (27 mi) is the only part of the river that is located in Syria. Some of its affluences are Garzan, Anbarçayi, Batman, and the Great and the Little Zab.

Close to its confluence with the Euphrates, the Tigris splits into several channels. First, the artificial Shatt al-Hayy branches off, to join the Euphrates near Nasiriyah. Second, the Shatt al-Muminah and Majar al-Kabir branch off to feed the Central Marshes. Further downstream, two other distributary channels branch off (the Al-Musharrah and Al-Kahla), to feed the Hawizeh Marshes. The main channel continues southwards and is joined by the Al-Kassarah, which drains the Hawizeh Marshes. Finally, the Tigris joins the Euphrates near al-Qurnah to form the Shatt-al-Arab. According to Pliny and other ancient historians, the Euphrates originally had its outlet into the sea separate from that of the Tigris.

Baghdad, the capital of Iraq, stands on the banks of the Tigris. The port city of Basra straddles the Shatt al-Arab. In ancient times, many of the great cities of Mesopotamia stood on or near the Tigris, drawing water from it to irrigate the civilization of the Sumerians. Notable Tigris-side cities included Nineveh, Ctesiphon, and Seleucia, while the city of Lagash was irrigated by the Tigris via a canal dug around 2900 B.C.

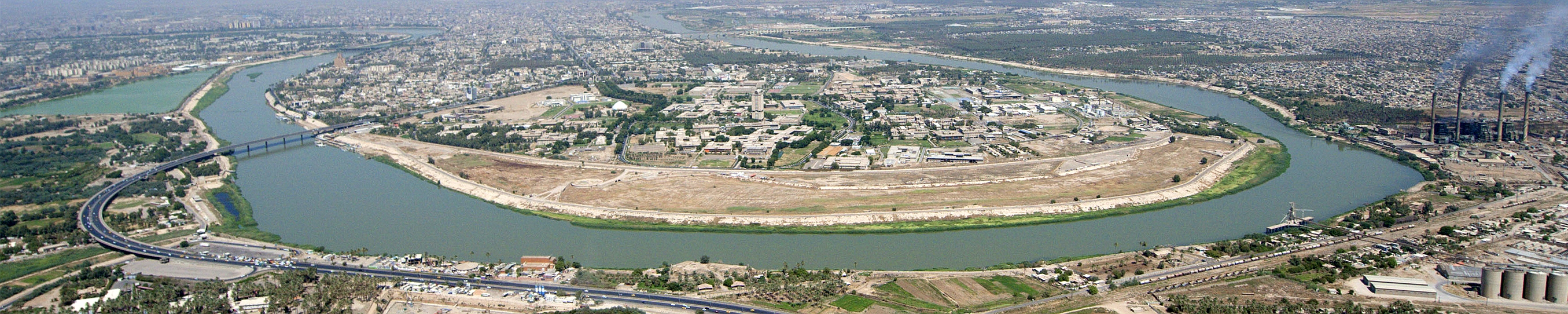
Tigris river in Baghdad

== Navigation ==
The Tigris has long been an important transport route in a largely desert country. Shallow-draft vessels can go as far as Baghdad, but rafts have historically been needed for transport downstream from Mosul.

== Management and water quality ==
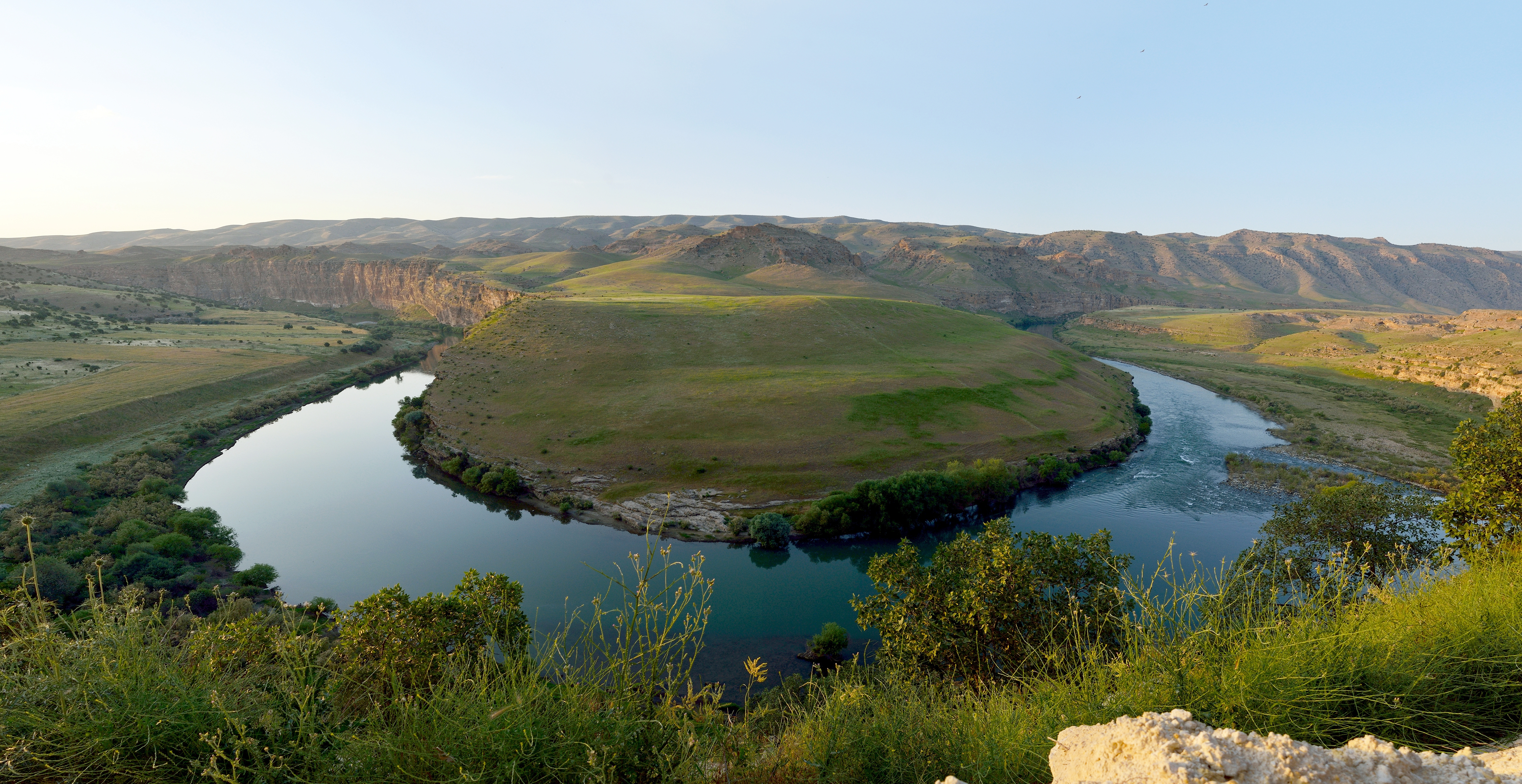
Tigris River as it flows through the valley of Êlih-Hafizbiniyan

Coat of arms of the Kingdom of Iraq (1932–1959) depicting the two rivers, the confluence Shatt al-Arab and the date palm forest, which used to be the largest in the world

The Tigris is heavily dammed in Iraq and Turkey to provide water for irrigating the arid and semi-desert regions bordering the river valley. Damming has also been important for averting floods in Iraq, to which the Tigris has historically been notoriously prone following April melting of snow in the Turkish mountains. Mosul Dam is the largest dam in Iraq.

Recent Turkish damming of the river has been the subject of some controversy, for both its environmental effects within Turkey and its potential to reduce the flow of water downstream.

Water from both rivers is used as a means of pressure during conflicts.

In 2014 a major breakthrough in developing consensus between multiple stakeholder representatives of Iraq and Turkey on a Plan of Action for promoting exchange and calibration of data and standards pertaining to Tigris river flows was achieved. The consensus, known as the "Geneva Consensus On Tigris River", was reached at a meeting organized in Geneva by the think tank Strategic Foresight Group.

In February 2016, the United States Embassy in Iraq as well as the Prime Minister of Iraq Haider al-Abadi issued warnings that Mosul Dam could collapse. The United States warned people to evacuate the floodplain of the Tigris because between 500,000 and 1.5 million people were at risk of drowning due to flash flood if the dam collapses, and that the major Iraqi cities of Mosul, Tikrit, Samarra, and Baghdad were at risk.

== Religion and mythology ==
In Sumerian mythology, the Tigris was created by the god Enki, who filled the river with flowing water.

In Hittite and Hurrian mythology, Aranzah (or Aranzahas in the Hittite nominative form) is the Hurrian name of the Tigris River, which was deified. He was the son of Kumarbi and the brother of Teshub and Tašmišu, one of the three gods spat out of Kumarbi's mouth onto Mount Kanzuras. Later he colluded with Anu and the Teshub to destroy Kumarbi (The Kumarbi Cycle).

The Tigris appears twice in the Old Testament. First, in the Book of Genesis, it is the third of the four rivers branching off the river issuing out of the Garden of Eden. The second mention is in the Book of Daniel, wherein Daniel states he received one of his visions "when I was by that great river the Tigris".

The Tigris River is also mentioned in Islam in Sunan Abi Daud 4306. The tomb of Imam Ahmad Bin Hanbal and Syed Abdul Razzaq Jilani is in Baghdad and the flow of Tigris restricts the number of visitors.

Baháʼu'lláh, the founder of the Baháʼí Faith, also wrote The Hidden Words around 1858 while he walked along the banks of the Tigris river during his exile in Baghdad.

The river featured on the coat of arms of Iraq from 1932 to 1959.

== See also ==
- Assyria
- Cradle of civilization
- Ilisu Dam Campaign campaign against a dam on Tigris in Turkey
- List of places in Iraq
- Mountains of Ararat
- Geography of Iraq
- Zagros Mountain
