= Hammar Marshes =

Marshes in Southern Iraq; a UNESCO World Heritage Site

East Hammar Marshes
UNESCO World Heritage Site
- Location within Iraq
- Part of: Ahwar of Southern Iraq
- Criteria: Mixed: (iii)(v)(ix)(x)
- Reference: 1481-003
- Inscription: 2016 (40th Session)
- Area: 20,342 ha (78.54 sq mi)
- Buffer zone: 12,721 ha (49.12 sq mi)
- Coordinates: 30°44′21″N 47°26′19″E

West Hammar Marshes
UNESCO World Heritage Site
- Location within Iraq
- Part of: Ahwar of Southern Iraq
- Criteria: Mixed: (iii)(v)(ix)(x)
- Reference: 1481-004
- Inscription: 2016 (40th Session)
- Area: 79,991 ha (308.85 sq mi)
- Buffer zone: 68,403 ha (264.11 sq mi)
- Coordinates: 30°50′30″N 46°41′03″E

Designations

Ramsar Wetland
- Official name: Hammar Marsh
- Designated: 7 April 2014
- Reference no.: 2242

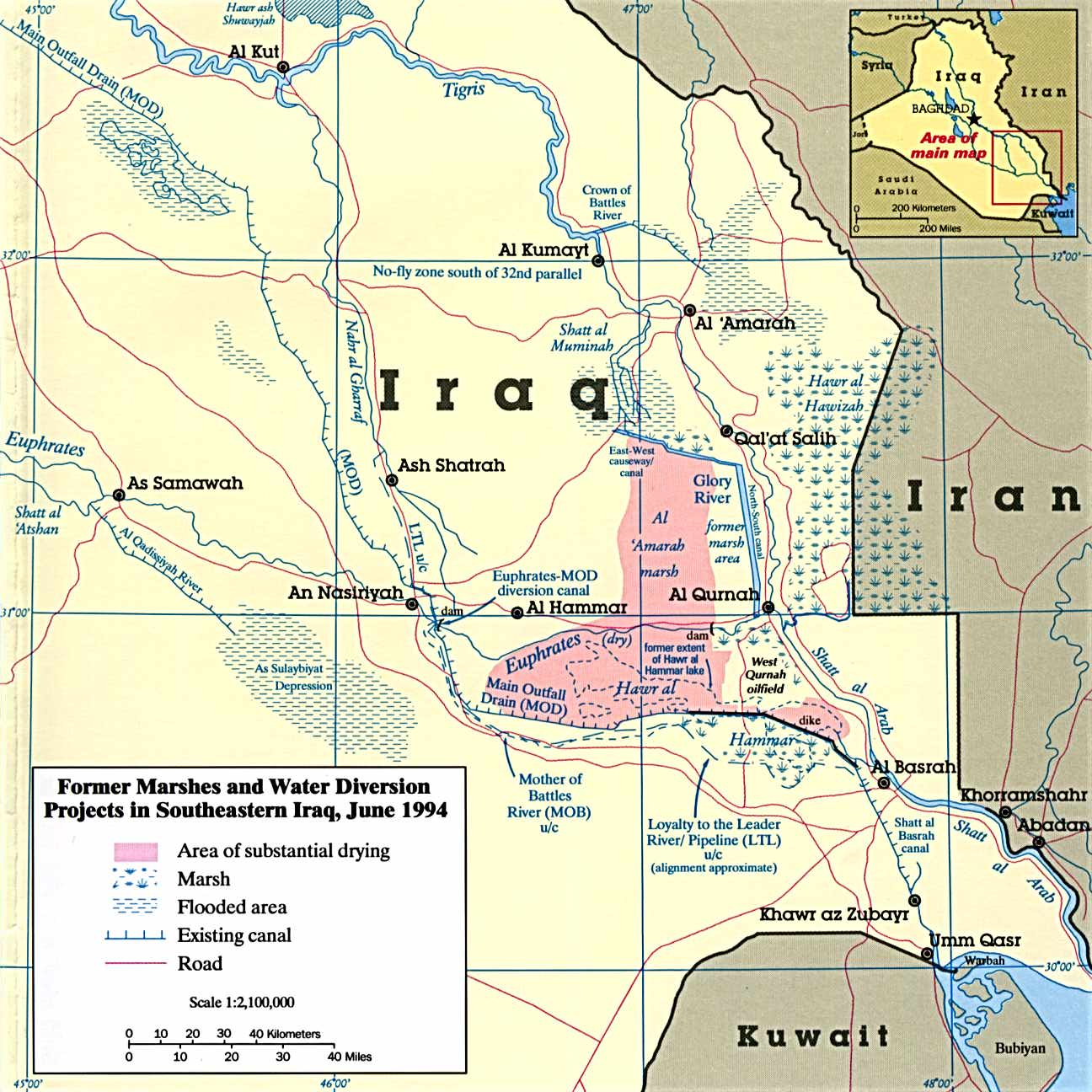
1994 Map of The Mesopotamian Marshes with draining features

The Hammar Marshes (Arabic: هور الحمار) are a large wetland complex in southeastern Iraq that are part of the Mesopotamian Marshes in the Tigris–Euphrates river system. Historically, the Hammar Marshes extended up to 4,500 km^{2} (1,700 sq mi) during seasonal floods. They were destroyed during the 1990s by large-scale drainage, dam and dike construction projects. Since 2003, they are recovering following reflooding and destruction of dams.

== Geography ==
The Hammar Marshes are located in the Dhi Qar and Basra Governorates. They are bordered in the north by the city of Al-Qurnah, in the northeast by the Euphrates River, in the southeast by the city of Basra, in the south by saline lakes and the Arabian Desert, in the west and northwest by the urban centres of Nasiriyah and Al-Chibayish. Its main water sources are the Euphrates and its tributaries. Additional water from the Tigris reached the wetland through overflow from the Central Marshes. Until the 1970s, the wetland stretched over 120 km × 25 km (75 mi × 16 mi) and permanently covered an area of 2,800 km^{2} (1,100 sq mi) that extended to about 4,500 km^{2} (1,700 sq mi) during seasonal floods. It was the largest in West Asia.

The shallow eutrophic and slightly brackish Lake Hammar is the largest water body in the Hammar Marshes.

== Ethnic groups ==
The main ethnic group in the area is the Marsh Arabs.

== History ==
Massive drainage projects were started in the 1990s. Canals and embankments were built that split the once contiguous wetland into two, the West and East Hammar Marshes. An additional barrier between the two parts is the Rumaila oil field. By 2000, less than 15% of the Hammar Marshes remained. Following the 2003 U.S. invasion of Iraq, returning Marsh Arabs broke embankments and drainage works, so that the wetland started to reflood. By the following year, vegetation had regrown significantly in the western part of the Hammar Marshes, and wildlife species returned. Recovery of the marshland habitat has been greater than expected, though there are still long-term risks to the habitat's viability due to pollution and water extraction from the Euphrates. The salinity level of the re-flooded wetlands is higher than in typical freshwater wetlands.

== Wildlife ==
=== Flora ===
The main plant species in the Hammar Marshes are hornwort, whorl-leaf watermilfoil, common reed, bulrush, sago pondweed, southern cattail and shining pondweed.

=== Fauna ===
Bird counts between 2003 and 2005 revealed that the most common species in the Hammar Marshes are little egret, black-headed gull, slender-billed gull, common gull and little tern. Notable birds include western marsh harrier, purple heron, grey heron, great cormorant, western cattle egret, black-winged stilt, little grebe, pied kingfisher, white-throated kingfisher and malachite kingfisher, white wagtail, isabelline shrike, bluethroat, Iraq babbler, white-eared bulbul, graceful prinia, common chiffchaff and house sparrow.

Mammal-oriented surveys carried out between 2009 and 2012 revealed the presence of jungle cat, European otter, gray wolf, red fox, golden jackal, striped hyena, honey badger, small Asian mongoose, wild boar, long-eared hedgehog, Kuhl's pipistrelle, Cape hare, Euphrates jerboa, brown rat, Asian house shrew, Etruscan shrew and house mouse.
