= Al Sa'dun =

Arab chiefly family of the Muntafiq confederation in southern Iraq

Al Sa'dun آل السعدون Al Saadoun, Al-Sa'dun, House of Sa'dun
- Arab chiefly and political family or clan
- Country: Iraq
- Current region: Southern Iraq, principally Dhi Qar and Basra
- Origin: Hejaz
- Historic seat: Suq al-Shuyukh and Nasiriyah
- Titles: Paramount sheikh of the Muntafiq
- Traditions: Sunni Islam

Al Sa'dun (Arabic السعدون) also known as Al Sa'dun family, Al Saadoun, Al-Sa'dun or the House of Sa'dun, is an Arab chiefly clan family of Husaynid origins that historically supplied the paramount sheikhs of the Muntafiq tribal confederation in southern Iraq. One of the most powerful tribal confederations of the Middle East and particularly Ottoman Iraq.

The family had been offered the kingship of Iraq by the British, but rejected on the grounds that cooperation with non-Muslims against a Muslim polity was not acceptable. They subsequently continued their battles with the British throughout Iraq and eastern Syria. General Sir John Nixon would declare them the foremost obstacle in the conquest of Iraq.

Their authority rested on hereditary prestige, military leadership, the settlement of disputes, the collection of taxes and tribute, the distribution of resources and recognition by the provincial government of the Ottoman Empire.

A famous member was Abdul Muhsin al-Sa'dun, who served four times as Prime Minister of Iraq between 1922 and 1929.

== Name ==
Sa'dun is a diminutive or affectionate form of the Arabic name Sa'd, which is derived from a root associated with happiness or good fortune. The name آل السعدون consists of the Arabic term Āl, followed by the personal name Sa'dun. It can therefore be translated as the “family of Sa'dun” or “House of Sa'dun”.

== History ==
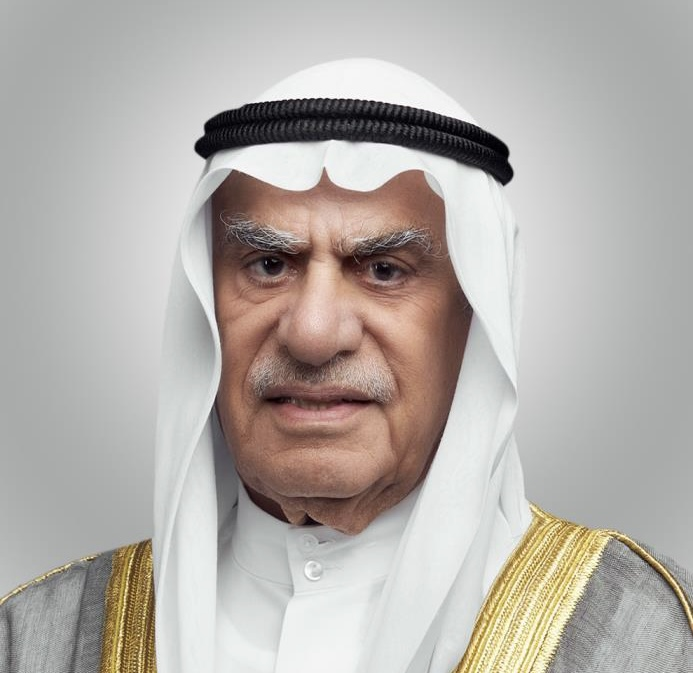
Ahmed Al-Sadoun, a Kuwaiti politician who served as Speaker of the National Assembly of Kuwait from 2023 to 2024.

=== Overview ===
The Al Sa'dun were the paramount chiefly family of the Muntafiq. The Muntafiq was not a single tribe, but a loose confederation made up of three main tribal groupings: the Bani Malik, Ajwad and Bani Sa'id. Each division had its own sheikhs, while their main political link was their recognition of the Al Sa'dun as the leading family. The confederation's territory stretched along the lower Euphrates and the Gharraf, with Suq al-Shuyukh serving as one of its main centres.

=== Ottoman period ===
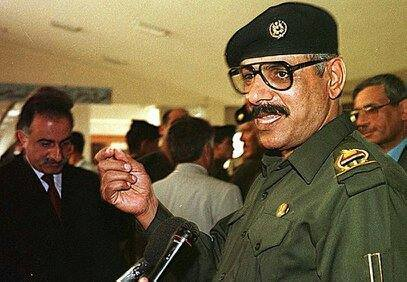
Abd Al-Baqi Abd Karim Al-Sadun, senior official of the Iraqi Ba'ath Party and member of its Regional Command. After 2003, he was listed as number 40 among the most-wanted officials of the former Iraqi government.

Relations with the Ottoman government shifted between cooperation, payment of tribute and open conflict. In 1776, the Muntafiq assisted in the defence of Basra against the forces of Karim Khan Zand. Between 1797 and 1802, they were the main local force defending the Basra region against the expanding First Saudi State. Sheikh Thuwaini al-Sa'dun led an expedition into central Arabia in 1801, but was killed before reaching the Saudi capital. In 1813, Humud al-Thamir al-Sa'dun defeated an army led by the governor of Baghdad, after which Sa'dun influence temporarily extended northwards to Samawah.

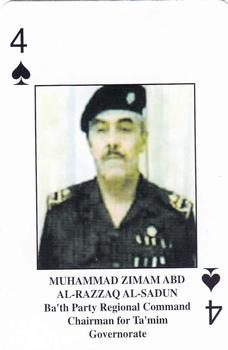
Muhammad Zimam al-Sadun – a former Iraqi politician who served as governor of Saladin Governorate and as minister of the interior from 1995 to 2001.

From the middle of the nineteenth century, the Ottoman authorities made a sustained effort to bring the Muntafiq under closer control. They frequently changed the recognised paramount sheikh, encouraged rivalry between branches of the family and increased the tribute demanded whenever the sheikhdom changed hands. The right to collect revenue from Muntafiq territory was also auctioned among competing sheikhs. In 1863, the governor Namik Pasha tried to place much of the region under direct administration and restrict Mansur al-Sa'dun to the office of kaymakam of Suq al-Shuyukh. Mansur resisted the measure and attempted to rally the tribes, forcing the governor to abandon the plan for the time being. Mansur's brother Nasir secured recognition as paramount sheikh in 1866 and later cooperated with the reforming governor Midhat Pasha. During the administrative reorganisation of the region around 1871, Nasir founded Nasiriyah, which became the seat of the Muntafiq district. He was later appointed governor of the newly established Basra Vilayet in 1875, but was removed and sent to Istanbul about two years later because the Ottoman authorities considered the combination of his tribal and official powers too strong.

The same reforms changed the basis of the family's power. Midhat Pasha authorised the registration of much of the Muntafiq's communal territory in the names of Nasir and other members of the Al Sa'dun. The family had previously received tribute as the confederation's chiefly house; its leading members now became registered landowners. Tribesmen who had regarded the land as belonging to their communities were increasingly treated as tenants. This strengthened the wealth of some Sa'dun branches, but it also produced disputes within the family and repeated resistance from the cultivators. By the end of the nineteenth century, the Muntafiq was divided between rival Sa'dun branches and tribal sheikhs who increasingly dealt with the Ottoman administration on their own. Sa'dun al-Mansur rose to prominence from 1891 and sought to recover the influence held by earlier members of his branch. After the Young Turk Revolution of 1908, he supported the Committee of Union and Progress and was entrusted with collecting taxes in the Muntafiq district, receiving the title Muslih al-Gharraf (“pacifier of the Gharraf”). In 1910, the governor of Baghdad, Nazim Pasha, gave him wider authority to collect revenue, impose order and disarm the tribes. Sa'dun al-Mansuruse of these powers brought him into conflict with rival relatives and several Muntafiq tribes. A general uprising broke out in 1911 after his defeat during an expedition against the Dhafir. An Ottoman commission concluded that the unrest was connected not only to his attempt to disarm the tribes, but also to the concentration of agricultural land in the hands of a small number of powerful sheikhs. The government then withdrew its support. Sa'dun was arrested near Suq al-Shuyukh, transferred to Baghdad and sent to Aleppo, where he died on 25 November 1911.

His son Ujaymi al-Sa'dun remained active in the region and, after initially hesitating, joined the Ottoman side when the First World War reached Iraq in November 1914. The prestige of the Al Sa'dun helped bring a large part of the Muntafiq into the campaign against the British. British forces occupied Nasiriyah and Suq al-Shuyukh in July 1915. Although members of the family remained important landowners and local political figures, the old system under which one Sa'dun sheikh exercised paramount authority over the whole confederation was not restored.

=== Monarchy ===
During the Iraqi monarchy, the family's political role increasingly passed from tribal leadership to national office. Its most prominent member was Abdul Muhsin al-Sa'dun, who became one of the leading Iraqi statesmen of the 1920s and served as prime minister.

== Legacy ==
Nasiriyah was named after Nasir Pasha al-Sa'dun who foundede the city. In Baghdad, Al-Sa'doun Street was named in memory of Abd al-Muhsin al-Sa'dun. A bronze statue of Abd al-Muhsin, made by an Italian sculptor in 1932, formerly stood on the street. It was stolen in July 2003 during the looting that followed the 2003 invasion of Iraq. Members of the al-Sa'dun family subsequently commissioned the Iraqi sculptor Taha Wahib to produce a fibreglass replacement.

== Religion ==
The Al Sa'dun have historically been Sunni Muslims. Their Sunni and sharifian identity distinguished them from much of the Muntafiq tribal population, which became predominantly Shi'i during the eighteenth and nineteenth centuries. Religious difference did not initially prevent the family from leading predominantly Shi'i tribal groups. Tribal relationships were based on protection, political alliances, military leadership, land and access to patronage rather than solely on sectarian identity. The Al Sa'dun continued to be recognised as its paramount family while maintaining their Sunni identity. Sectarian distinctions became more socially significant as the older tribal organisation weakened and Sa'dun family members developed into Sunni landowners whose estates were cultivated largely by Shi'i tenants and tribesmen.

== Genealogy ==
The Sa'duns traditionally claim descent from the sharifs of Mecca and consequently from the Hashemite lineage. This genealogy is repeated in Iraqi family histories, tribal accounts and a number of British administrative records.

According to one version of the tradition, an ancestor named Mani belonged to the sharifian family governing Mecca. After becoming involved in a feud in the Hejaz, Mani travelled to the lower Euphrates region around the beginning of the seventeenth century. He acquired influence among the Muntafiq by mediating between its tribal divisions and was eventually recognised as their paramount leader. A more detailed genealogy was recorded by the British Arab Bureau in 1917. According to the report's informants, an ancestor named Shabib migrated from the Hejaz to southern Iraq during the sixteenth century. His son Mani married into the chiefly house of Bani Malik. Mani's descendants subsequently acquired leadership of Bani Malik and brought the major Muntafiq divisions under a common paramount sheikh.

The family's continued recognition as sayyids formed an important component of its social prestige. This status distinguished the Sa'duns from the large tribal groupings that accepted their paramount leadership.

The family name is associated with an eighteenth-century ancestor named Sa'dun ibn Muhammad. He is identified as the forefather from whom the family became collectively known as Al Sa'dun. Accounts disagree over the exact year of his death. Some place it in the early 1740s, while an Iraqi account recorded by the historian Ya'qub Sarkis places his death in 1748.

== Notable members ==
- Thamir ibn Sa'dun – eighteenth-century leader of the ruling house whose death in 1779 was followed by the consolidation of the Muntafiq sheikhdom under his cousin Thuwaini ibn Abdallah.
- Thuwaini ibn Abdallah – eighteenth-century paramount sheikh of the Muntafiq and member of the earlier Al Shabib branch of the ruling house. He briefly occupied and governed Basra, extended Muntafiq influence into eastern Arabia and commanded an Ottoman-supported campaign against the First Saudi State before his assassination in 1797.
- Hamud ibn Thamir al-Sa'dun – paramount sheikh who succeeded his maternal half-brother Thuwaini in 1797. He became one of the most powerful tribal leaders of early nineteenth-century southern Iraq and was noted in Arabic biographical literature for his military leadership and horsemanship.
- Aqil ibn Muhammad al-Sa'dun – paramount sheikh appointed by the Ottoman governor Dawud Pasha after the removal of his uncle Hamud ibn Thamir. He was killed in 1832 during a struggle with Hamud's sons.
- Bandar ibn Nasir al-Sa'dun – mid-nineteenth-century paramount sheikh of the Muntafiq. During the early Ottoman administrative reorganisation of southern Iraq, he was appointed to govern the Muntafiq district and died in 1863.
- Mansur Pasha al-Sa'dun – nineteenth-century paramount sheikh, tax farmer and Ottoman administrator. He acquired the Muntafiq sheikhdom after a conflict with his cousin Faris ibn Aqil and was later appointed kaymakam of Suq al-Shuyukh.
- Nasir Pasha al-Sa'dun – paramount sheikh, Ottoman mutasarrif of the Muntafiq and governor of the Basra Vilayet. He accompanied the Ottoman campaign into al-Ahsa, and the city of Nasiriyah was named after him.
- Fahd Pasha ibn Ali al-Sa'dun – paramount sheikh, Ottoman administrator and member of the Baghdad provincial administrative council. He was the father of Abdul Muhsin al-Sa'dun and a major political and landed figure during the late nineteenth century.
- Sa'dun Pasha al-Mansur – paramount sheikh and rebel leader who conducted a prolonged struggle against rival members of the family and the Ottoman authorities between approximately 1891 and 1911. He was also known as Muslih al-Gharraf, or “pacifier of the Gharraf”.
- Ujaymi Pasha al-Sa'dun – son and political successor of Sa'dun al-Mansur. He commanded Muntafiq tribal forces supporting the Ottoman Empire during the Mesopotamian campaign and continued armed resistance after the British occupation of southern Iraq.
- Abdullah Beg ibn Falih Pasha al-Sa'dun – leader of the Nasir branch during and immediately after the First World War. British military reports described him as the principal hereditary rival of Ujaymi and noted that much of the Muntafiq continued to regard him as its rightful paramount sheikh.
- Thamir Beg al-Sa'dun – elder brother and political rival of Ujaymi. He supported the Arab Revolt, developed connections with Hussein bin Ali and was arrested in 1920, prompting the king to protest on the basis of Thamir's previous services to the revolt.
- Ibrahim Beg al-Sa'dun – Iraqi administrator appointed mutasarrif of the Muntafiq division by the Iraqi Council of Ministers in 1921.
- Abdul Muhsin al-Sa'dun – Ottoman army officer and parliamentary deputy who became one of the leading statesmen of the Kingdom of Iraq. He served four terms as Prime Minister of Iraq, presided over the Chamber of Deputies of Iraq and founded the Progressive Party.
- Ahmed Abdulaziz al-Sadoun - A Kuwaiti politician and activist who was the Speaker of the Kuwaiti National Assembly from June 20, 2023 to February 15, 2024.
- Abd Al-Baqi Abd Karim Al-Sadun – senior official of the Iraqi Ba'ath Party and member of its Regional Command. After 2003, he was listed as number 40 among the most-wanted officials of the former Iraqi government.
- Muhammad Zimam al-Sadun – a former Iraqi politician who served as governor of Saladin Governorate and as minister of the interior from 1995 to 2001.

== See also ==
- Al-Muntafiq
- Abdul Muhsin al-Sa'dun
- Nasiriyah
- Suq al-Shuyukh District
- Tribes of Iraq
- Ottoman Iraq
- Basra Vilayet
- History of Iraq
