= Muhammad Sa'id al-Habboubi =

Iraqi Ayatollah (1849-1915)

Mohammed Saeed Al-Habboubi محمد سعيد الحبوبي
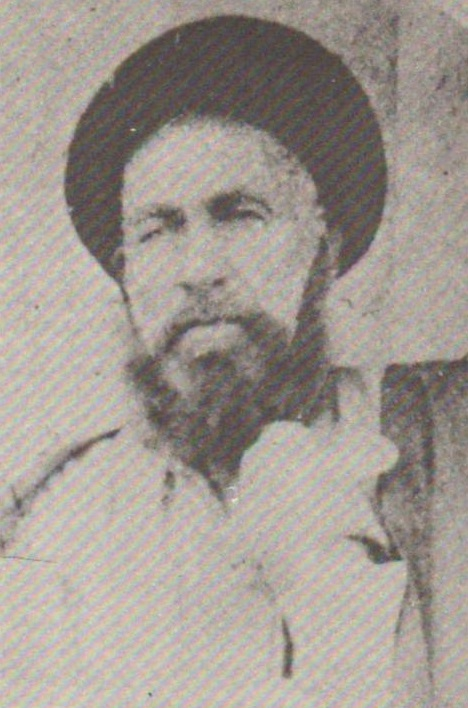
- A portrait of Al-Habboubi

Personal life
- Born: 1849 Najaf, Ottoman Iraq
- Died: 1915 (aged 65–66) Nasiriyah, Ottoman Iraq
- Resting place: Najaf
- Notable work: Collection of poems
- Occupation: poet, Faqih, merchant

Religious life
- Religion: Islam
- Denomination: Shia Islam

Sayyid Muhammad Sa'id Al-Habboubi (Arabic: السيد محمد سعيد الحبوبي) (1849- 1915) was an Iraqi poet, Faqīh, and merchant, born in Najaf, Ottoman Iraq, to a wealthy family.

== Life and career ==
He studied Faqih and Arabic language in Hawza of the Najaf. Later, he worked in trade, and had to move often between Najaf and Najad due to his business. He described his travels and expatriation in his poems. Habboubi quit poetry when he reached forty, and spent the rest of his life teaching Fiqh in Hawza of the Najaf.

At breakout of the World War I, Al-Habboubi led volunteer groups in the Ottoman Empire against British invading forces, but he died suddenly during the Siege of Kut in 1915.

He was buried in Imam Ali Mosque in Najaf city.

A sculpture was erected to Habboubi in the central square of Nasiriyah city.

== Books ==
- collection of poems (4 editions).

== See also ==
- Iraqi art
- List of Iraqi artists
- Al-Habboubi Square
