= Al-Muntafiq =

Arab Ottoman vassal state, c. 1530–1918

Al-Muntafiq Emirate Arabic: إمارة المنتفق, romanized: Imarat 𝘈𝘭-𝘔𝘶𝘯𝘵𝘢𝘧𝘪𝘲 Arabic: اتحاد المنتفق, romanized: Ittihad 𝘈𝘭-𝘔𝘶𝘯𝘵𝘢𝘧𝘪𝘲
- 1530–1918
- Flag of the Al-Muntafiq Confederation

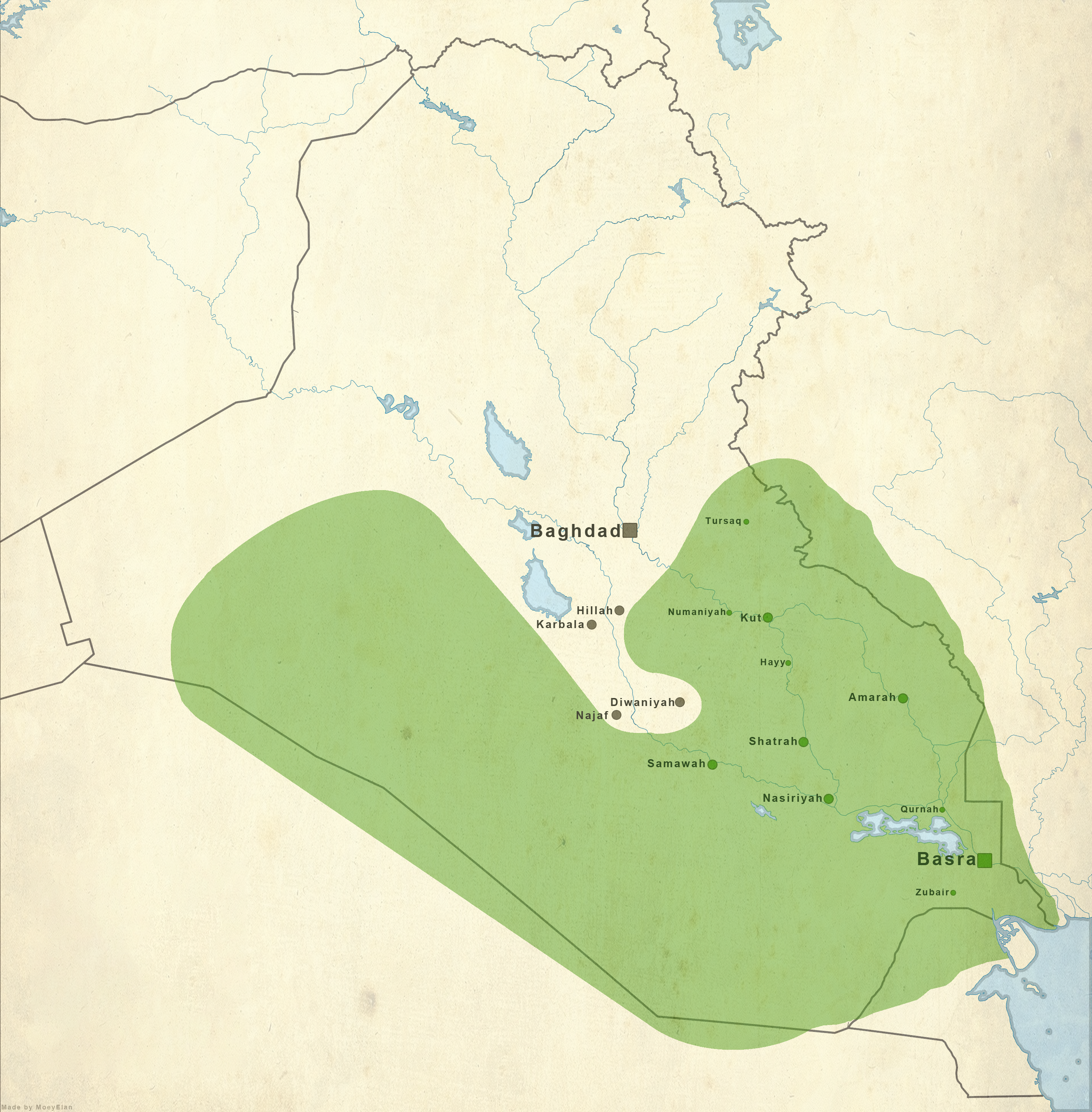
- Muntafiq Sphere of Influence (not direct control)
- Capital: Basra (Ottoman suzerainty); Al-Shatrah (seat of power)
- Common languages: Arabic Ottoman Turkish
- Religion: Shia Islam (Majority) Sunni Islam (Ruling family)
- Government: Monarchy, Confederation
- Sheikh/Emir
  - 1530–1918: Al Sadun Family
- Historical era: Modern History
  - Basra Eyalet: 1530
  - Partitioning of the Ottoman Empire: 30 October 1918
- Currency: Ottoman lira
Preceded by
Ottoman Empire
Musha'sha
Succeeded by
Mandatory Iraq
Sheikhdom of Kuwait
Sultanate of Nejd
Qajar Iran
- Today part of: Iraq; Saudi Arabia; Kuwait; Iran

Al-Muntafiq (Arabic: المنتفق) was a large Arab tribal confederation and semi-centralized Emirate of southern Iraq and Kuwait. The confederation's tribes predominantly settled in Iraq's southern provinces and northern Kuwait.

The confederation is not homogeneous in terms of sect/religion. Sociopolitical conditions and intermingling created a mix of Sunni and Shia tribes, with Shiites becoming predominant by the late 18th or early 19th century.

Therefore, a minority of individual tribes within the confederation are Sunni - most notably the leading Al Sadun clan whom are centered in Iraq but have also settled in smaller portion in Saudi Arabia and Kuwait (an example being Kuwaiti speaker of the National Assembly, Ahmed Al-Sadoun).

Overall, it is almost impossible to delineate who is, and who is not part of the Muntafiq given that the confederation ceased to have political recognition as the Ottoman empire came to an end, and British rule ended tribal power for the establishment of a central monarchy.

The Iraqi state today recognizes tribal chiefs based on their individual tribes, not based on their affiliation with the historical confederation. Accordingly, there is little incentive to document and trace historical relationship to the Muntafiq.

== Present ==
The tribe is divided into three main branches: Bani Malik, al-Ajwad, and Bani Sa'id. Most of the tribe traces its genealogy to the tribe of Banu 'Uqayl of the large and ancient Banu 'Amir confederation of Najd. However, the tribe's traditional leaders are Al-Saadun ("the house of Saadun"), who are said to be Sharifs originating from Mecca and descending from the Muhannā dynasty which ruled Medina starting in c. 940 when their husaynid ancestor Ubayd Allah Ibn tahir seized the city until the 16th century. The al-Ajwad branch is said to partially originate from the ancient Arab tribe of Tayy. The Muntafiq tribe was led by Yusuf Beg of the Saadun clan. They were traditional rivals of the Dhufir, Shammar, Al-Sabah, and of Ibn Saud, although Yusuf sometimes co-operated with Ibn Saud.

The tribe migrated to Iraq during the Islamic conquests. In Ottoman Iraq, the tribe held control over the region of Basrah under Ottoman suzerainty. In 1521, and later in the 19th century they successfully occupied al-Ahsa and al-Qatif (eastern Saudi Arabia today) and Qatar before being expelled by Banu Khalid.

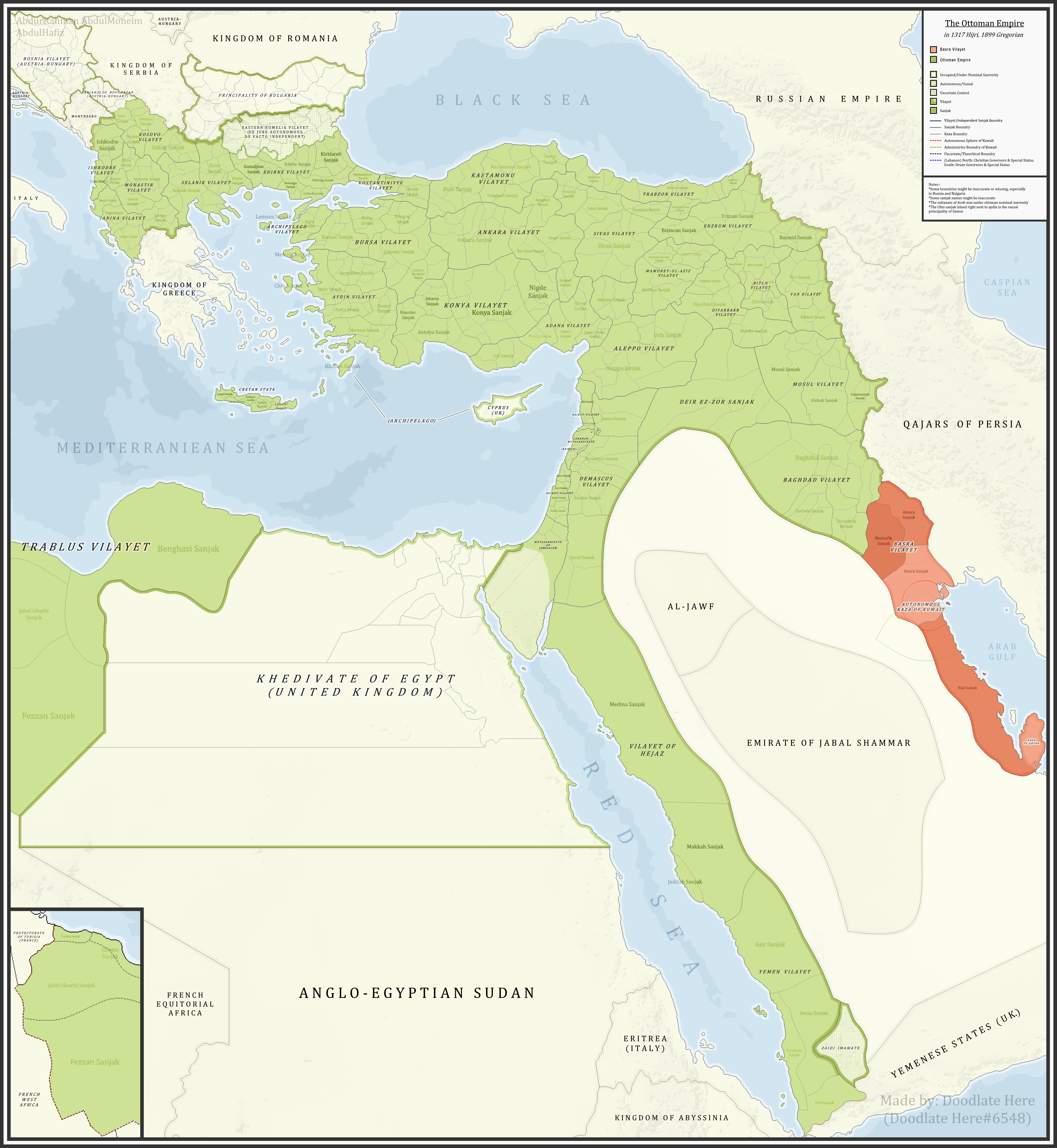
Map of the Ottoman Empire and the Vilayet of Basra in Red, which was under direct rule of the Sadoon Tribe

During the Ottoman era, most of the tribe settled into sedentary life and took up agriculture in southern and western Iraq. Due to intermarriage with Shiites and the ottoman re-routing of canals towards Najaf, from the late eighteenth century onwards, most of al-Muntafiq converted to Shia Islam.

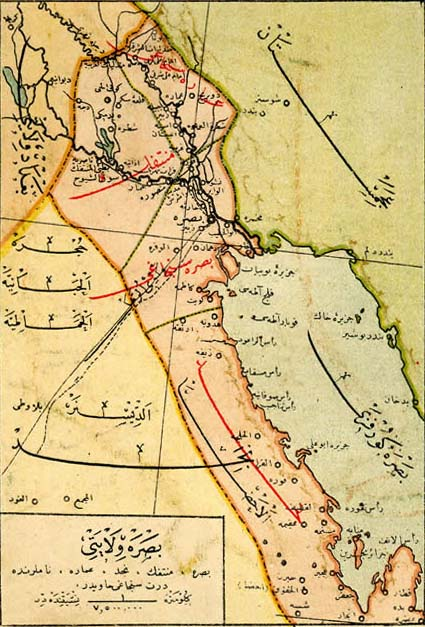
Ottoman depictions of the Vilayet of Basra, early 20th century

The muntafiq founded several cities in Iraq including Suq al-Shuyukh, Al-Shatrah, and most notably Nasiriya in southern Iraq was named after one of the Al-sadun sheikhs, and the surrounding province was known as "Al-Muntafiq Province" until 1976.

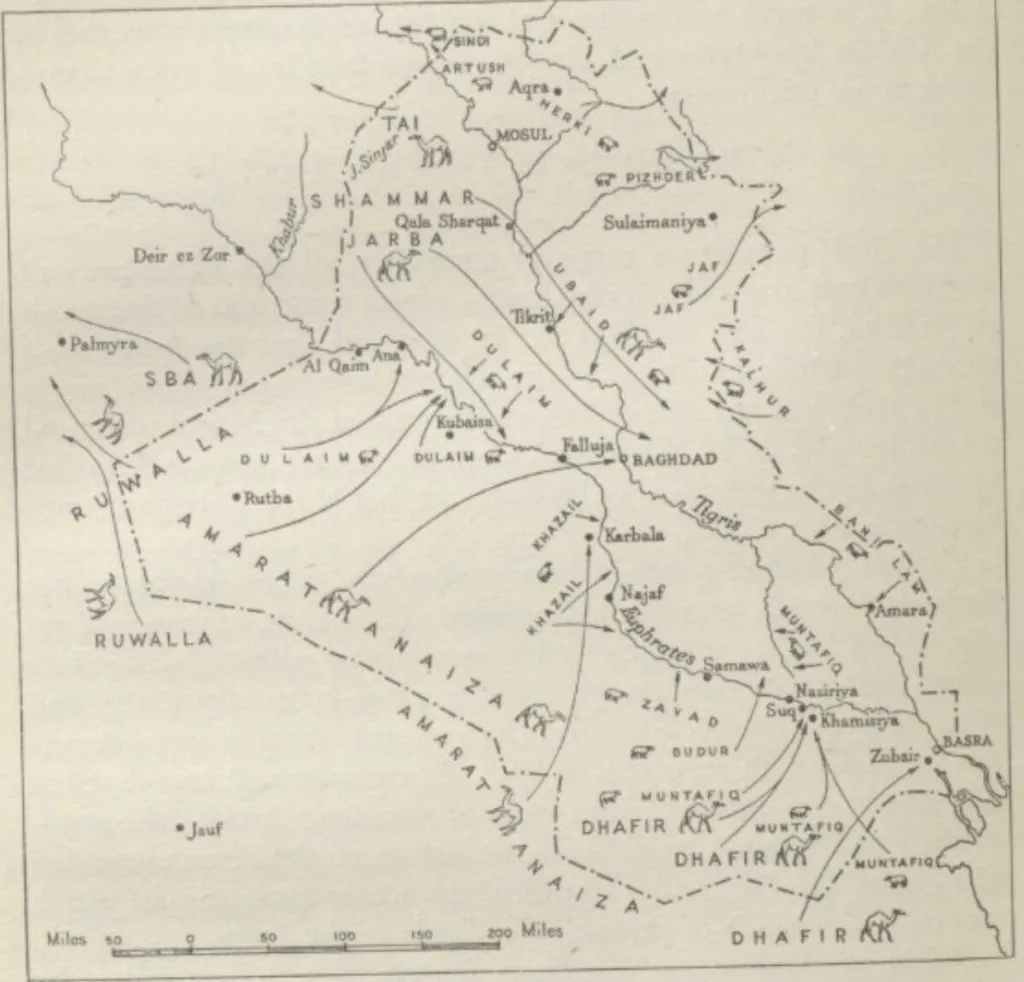
Tribal migrations in Iraq

Although the tribe's nominal leaders, the Al Saadun, are Sunnis, most of the tribe's members follow the Shi'ite sect of Islam. After many decades of sedentarization, the tribal bond has weakened and the leadership of the Al Saadun is largely nominal.

Many stateless "bedoons" in Kuwait belong to the Muntafiq tribal confederation.

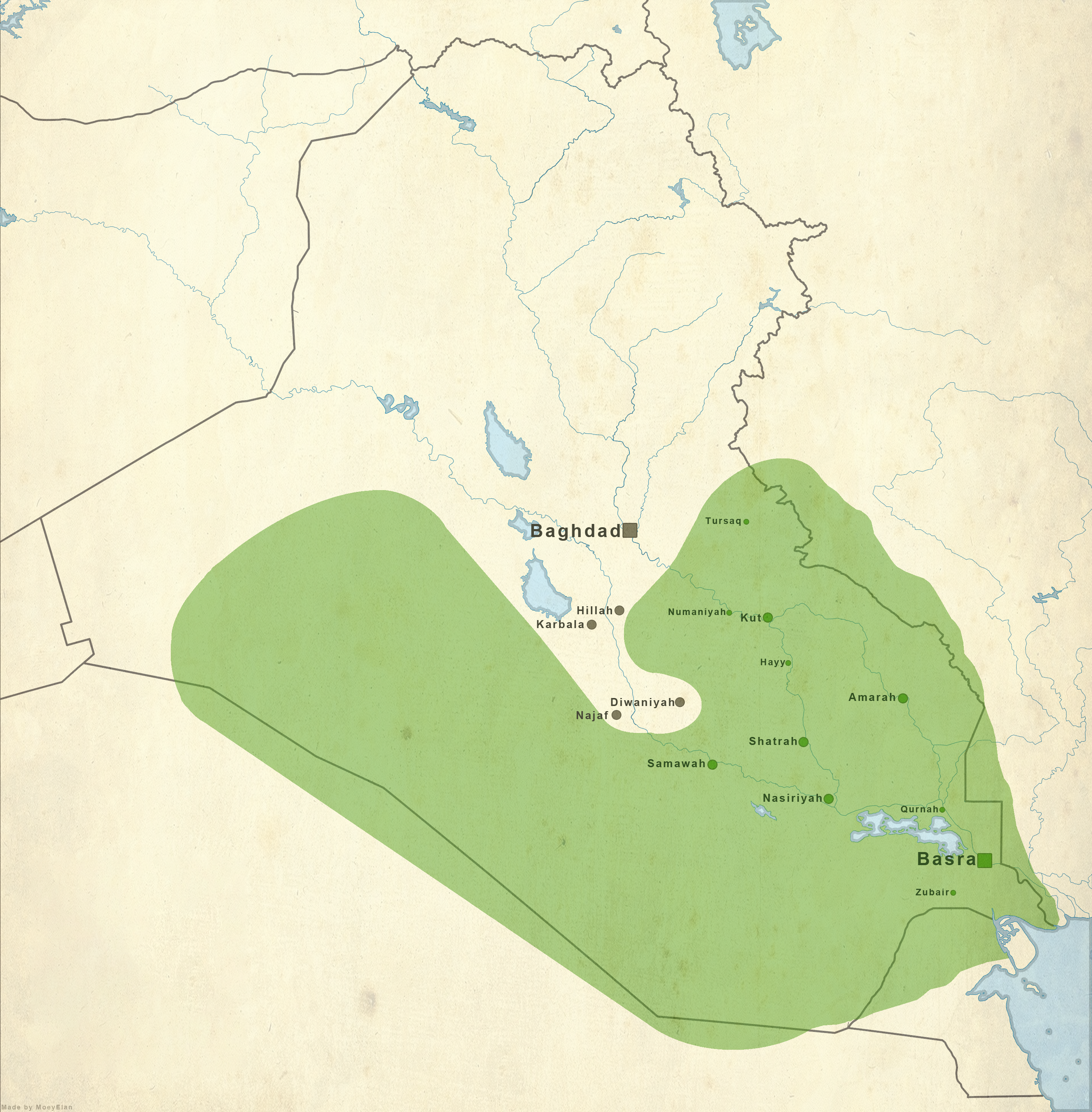
Almuntafiq Emirate

== Division ==
The Emirate was divided into three regions (divisions). The three major divisions are Bani Saeed, Bani Malik, and Ajwad. Other tribes mentioned were close allies, or joined the confederation for a certain period of time in history:

- Bani Saeed
- Bani Malik Division:
1. Albu Salih
2. Al Ibrahim
3. Al Jumaiyaan
4. Al Wadai
5. Al Majid
6. Al Diwan
7. Al Taughiyah
- Al Ajwad Division:
1. Al Usoom
2. Al Shuwailat
3. Al Humaid
4. Al Rufai
5. Al Bdour
6. Al Juwarin
7. Al Ghezzi
8. Al Shuraifat
- Bani Huchaim:
1. Al Dhuwalim
2. Al Zayyad
3. Al Jawabur
4. Al Towba
5. Al Aajeeb
6. Al Abas
7. Al Ghazalat
8. Bani Salamah
- Al Aunan

== See also ==
- Bedoon

== Sources ==
- Levi Della Vida, G.; Sluglett, P. "al- Muntafiḳ ." Encyclopaedia of Islam. Edited by: P. Bearman, Th. Bianquis, C.E. Bosworth, E. van Donzel and W.P. Heinrichs. Brill, 2007. Brill Online.
- 'The Muntafik. Al Sa'dun, Bani Malik, Ajwad, Bani Sa'id, Bani Huchaim', British Library: India Office Records and Private Papers, IOR/L/PS/20/63, in Qatar Digital Library <https://www.qdl.qa/archive/81055/vdc_100000000912.0x000004> [accessed 2 December 2025]
- Christiane Thompson, Iranian Tentacles into Iraq, 2009 Archived 19 June 2014 at the Wayback Machine
