= Imams Al-Baqi Brigade =

Iran armed militia

- لواء ائمة البقيع
- Leader: Saad Tais
- Dates active: 2014 - Present
- Country: Iraq
- Active regions: Diyala
- Size: 3,500 - 5,000
- Part of: Popular Mobilization Forces
- Wars: War in Iraq (2013–2017)

Imams Al-Baqi Brigade or 24 brigade (Arabic: لواء ائمة البقيع) is part of Popular Mobilization, it is an armed Iraqi group that fights alongside Shiite groups, backed by Iran and that was created to fight ISIS, Brigade is located in Diyala Governorate.

== Highlight ==
Recordings leaked by Ali Fadel, one of the Iraqi anti-corruption, spread recordings of a person named Karim Saleh Karim who works for Imams Al-Baqi Brigade or 24 brigade. It was revealed that the Brigade worked for former President Nuri al-Maliki. There was cooperation between them, and he also mentioned that he obtained coordinates from the Diyala Operations Command, to attack an Iraqi army point. However, he went to the point to find that it was actually a point belonging to the Iraqi army and not, as they said, affiliated with ISIS, so he decided afterwards to defect from the Imams Al-Baqi Brigade.

== Activities ==
Some of the group's illegal activities:

- Drugging an insane person and wearing him an explosive belt to attack Shiite pilgrims and accuse ISIS of doing it, The insane person was killed by the Iraqi army, after chasing him for 4 hours.
- Bringing more than 20 insane people and providing them with explosive belts to be killed later on the pretext of belonging to ISIS.
- Blackmailing Iraqi deputies.
- Smuggling money.
- Kidnapping people and asking for ransom.
- Blackmailing Deputy Alaa Al-Rikabi for selling narcotics without a permit in his pharmacy, which he owns in Nasiriyah city.
- Attacking Iraqi army points and shooting a number of them.
