= Muhammad Zimam al-Sadun =

Iraqi politician and war criminal

- محمد زمام عبد الرزاق
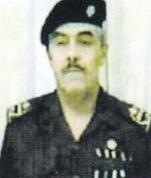

Ministry of Interior
- In office 1995 – May 2001

Personal details
- Born: Muhammad Zimam abd al-Razzaq al-Sadun; 1942 (age 83–84) Dhi Qar, Iraq
- Party: Iraqi Regional Branch of the Arab Socialist Ba'ath Party

Muhammad Zimam abd al-Razzaq al-Sadun (Arabic: محمد زمام عبد الرزاق) is an Iraqi politician and convicted war criminal.

== Biography ==
Muhammad Zimam abd al-Razzaq al-Sadun was born in 1942 in Suq al-Shuyukh District in al-Muntafiq Brigade (currently Dhi Qar Governorate). He belongs to al-Saadoun tribe. He held several positions during the rule of the Arab Socialist Baath Party in Iraq, including a member of the Revolutionary Command Council and Governor of Saladin Governorate. He completed his studies in law and political science. He served as Minister of the Interior from 1995 to May 2001, when he was succeeded by Mahmud Dhiyab.

== After the 2003 invasion ==
He was on the list of Iraqis most wanted by the United States and was arrested at his home in Al-Saydiya neighborhood in Baghdad on 15 February 2004. On 9 April 2009, he was sentenced to life in prison over involvement in the ethnic cleansing of Kurds and other minorities.
