= Al-Habboubi Square =

Public square in Nasiriyah, Iraq

Coordinates: 31.045665°N 46.253574°E

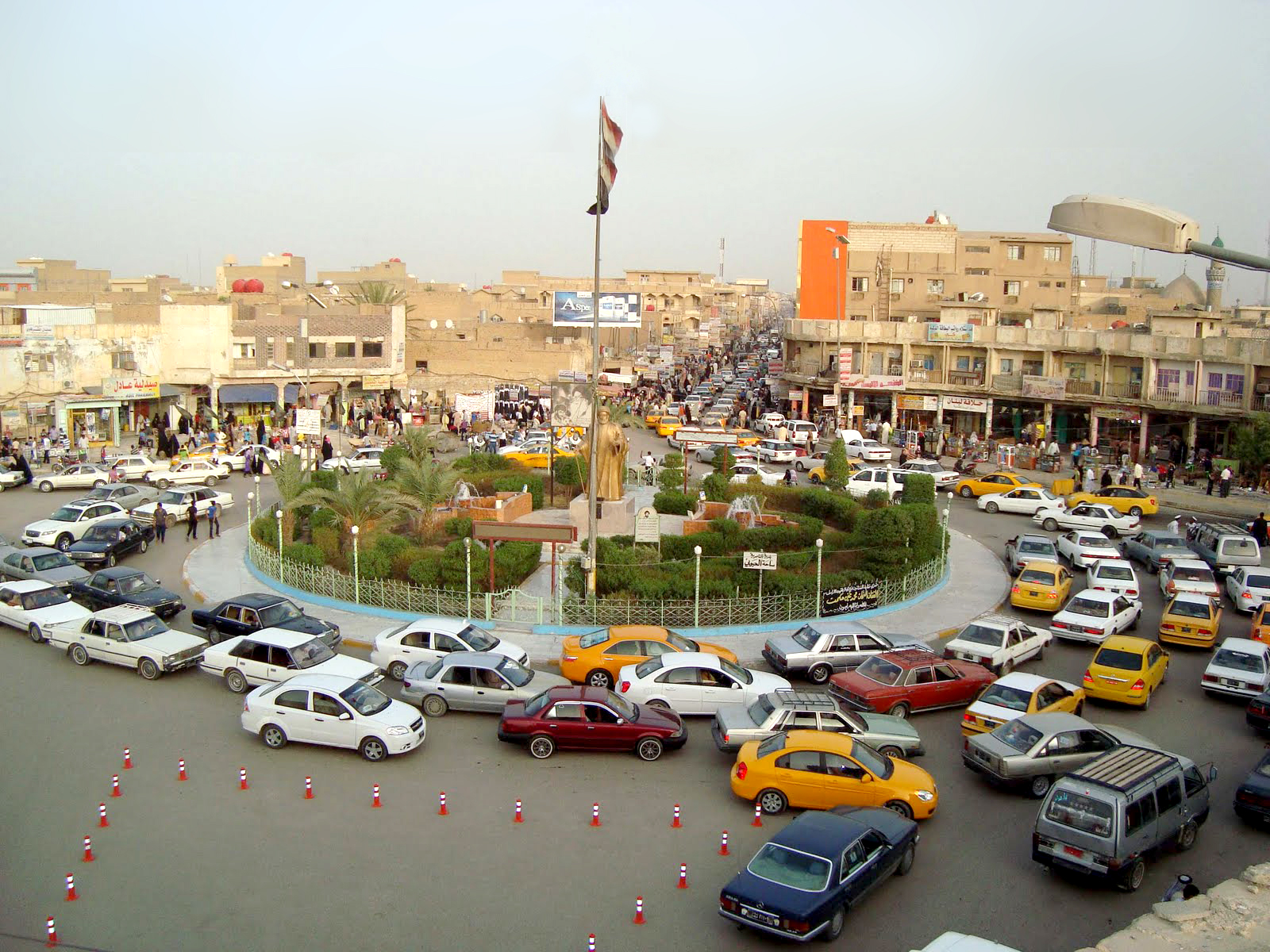
Al-Habboubi Square

Al-Habboubi Square (Arabic: ساحة الحبوبي) is a public square and roundabout in central Nasiriyah. The statue of the Iraqi Poet Mohammed Saeed Al-Habboubi is located in the square and the statue was built in 1971. It is at the intersection of Nile and Habboubi streets.

== See also ==
- 2020 Al-Habboubi Square attack
