= Mahmud Dhiyab =

Iraqi diplomat

Mahmud Dhiyab al-Ahmad (Arabic: محمود ذياب الأحمد; born 1953 in Baghdad or Mosul) is an Iraqi former diplomat, who held several cabinet-level positions.

== Biography ==
Dhiyab was Iraq's Minister of Agriculture during the Gulf War. In September 1991, he became involved in a dispute with Hussein Kamel al-Majid, Iraq's Minister of Defense, over the reconstruction of Baghdad's Republic Bridge. In the mid-1990s, Dhiyab served as Iraq's Minister of Housing and Reconstruction. He later became Minister of Irrigation, during which time he was a central figure in negotiations with Turkey and Syria over water rights. Dhiyab succeeded Muhammad Zimam Abd Al-Razzaq as Iraq's Interior Minister on May 28, 2001, with Abd al-Razzaq stepping down in order to devote more time to his work as head of the Ba'ath Party in Kirkuk and Niniveh. Rasul Abd-al-Husayn al-Swadi succeeded Dhiyab as Minister of Irrigation. As a result of the Iraq War, Dhiyab was removed from power with the rest of Hussein's regime. After the invasion, he was listed as the seven of spades on the most-wanted Iraqi playing cards. American forces announced that they had captured Dhiyab on July 9, 2003, but this proved to be an error. The real Dhiyab surrendered himself on August 9, 2003.

Dhiyab was released from prison in July 2012 after completing his sentence.
