= Albu Salih =

Arabic tribe

Albu Salih البوصالح
- Tribal Confederation in the Muntafiq Emirate
- Ethnicity: Arabs
- Nisba: Alsalihi الصالحي
- Location: Lower Euphrates and North East Arabia
- Descended from: Bani Malik بني مالك; Bani A'arid بني عارض; Shammar شمّر (In the past, today own autonomy)
- Language: Arabic
- Religion: Islam

The Albu Salih tribe (Arabic: آلبو صالح) is an Arab tribe from the Bani Malik of the Al-Muntafiq.

During the 18th century, the Albu Salih transformed into a tribal confederation (a warfare alliance) due to their opposition against the Ottoman Empire influence in the region. This alliance helped reduce the internal conflicts between other neighboring clans that later on joined, and claim of different Arab tribal origins.

The Albu Salih grew in power, and under the leadership of Shaikh Badr Al Rumaiyadh, they had become the most influential tribe in the Bani Malik region of the Muntafiq Emirate. This resulted in Shaikh Bader's rise to become the paramount Shaikh of the Bani Malik region.

== Indigenous lands and territory ==
In the past, the tribe consisted of both settled villagers, and semi-nomads.

=== Settled Branches of Albu Salih ===
The settled branches settled in villages, near the great marshes of the Albu Salih tribal territory (click to see map in 1941), known today as the district of Al' Islah (in Dhi Qar). The district was established by Shaikh Sulaiman bin Mansur Al Nasrallah in 1918.

The Albu Salih territory was rich in arable land, and marshes, which promoted agriculture for the cultivator sections of the tribe. The sophisticated geography of the Marshes, was in great advantage of Shaikh Bader's resistance against the British forces.

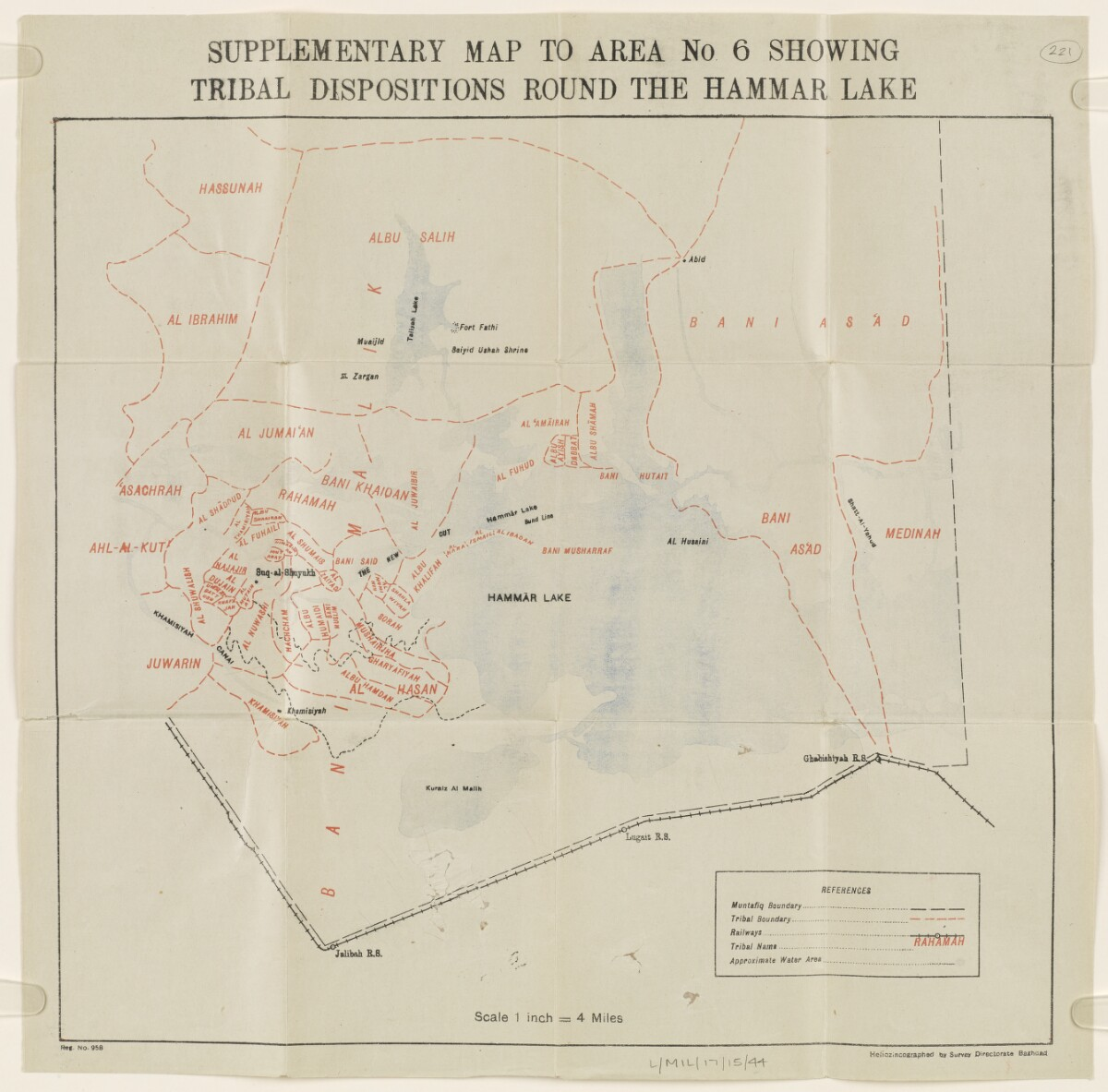
Tribal Lands in the Bani Malik region 1923

=== Nomadic Branches of Albu Salih ===
Historically the bedouin semi-nomads of Albu Salih, would migrate south into the desert annually during autumn. They would camp, and herd their livestock in the North Eastern parts of Arabia.(Southern Iraq; Northern and Western Kuwaiti territories today).

The Albu Salih clans were known to be well armed, and would migrate, through the Wadi Batin valley moving into Kuwait, reaching the Arabian Gulf coast. Alongside them usually were other Muntafiq tribes such as "Shuraifat", "Juwarin", "Al Aunan", as well as other clans of the Bani Malik.

The Albu Salih bedouins during this migration would tend to trade with locals of nearby villages, and towns of Kuwait.

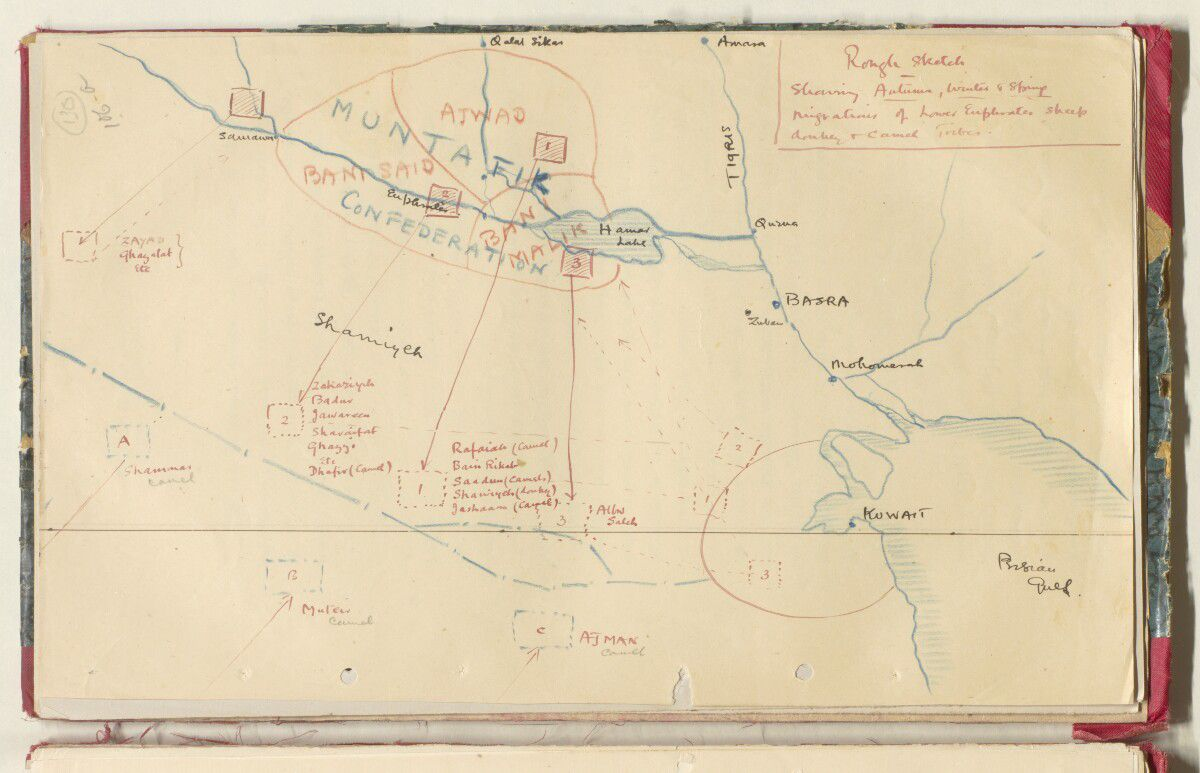
Preliminary sketch of the annual migration autumn winter spring seasons of the lower Euphrates semi nomad tribes (Albu Salih) included. 1929 British Archives

By the end of the spring season the Albu Salih nomads, would migrate back north to their tribal territory for the summer.

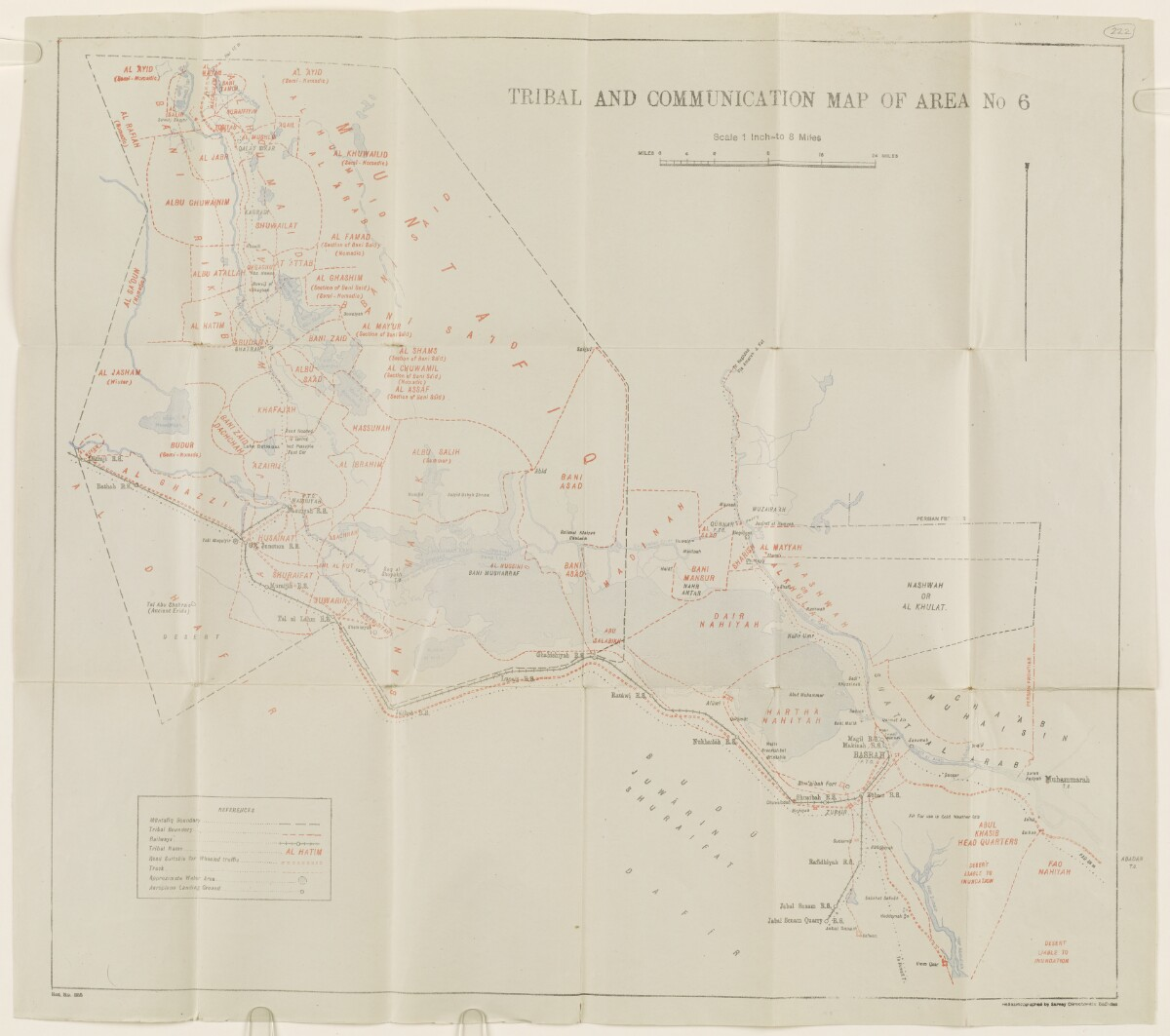
Tribal Territory of Area 6 (Al-Muntafiq Emirate) Albu Salih nomads summer season territory seen. 1923 British Archives

During the 1940s and early 1950s a majority of the Albu Salih nomads had left the nomadic lifestyle and settled. They had settled in countries, cities, and towns that were either part of, or close to the indigenous lands of the Muntafiq.

=== Location of Albu Salih today ===
Members of this tribe today are located in Iraq, Kuwait, Iran and Saudi Arabia.

In Iraq, the Albu Salih are concentrated in Al Islah (Arabic: الأصلاح), in the province of Dhi Qar; they can also be found in Amarah, Basra (Safwan; Zubayr), and Al Diwaniyah.

Shaikh Sabah bin Fares bin Mohsen bin Bader Al Rumaiyadh is the current leader of the Albu Salih

== Sections of Albu Salih ==
The Main Sections of the Albu Salih are:

1. Al Rumaiyadh (آل رميض) - Bani Malik (بني مالك)
2. Al Nasrallah (آل نصرالله) - Shammar (of Abdah section, Alzagareet) (شمّر من عبده الزقاريط)
3. Al Khlawi (الخليوي) - Bani A'ridh (بني عارض)
4. Al Omar (آل عمر) - Rabe'a (ربيعة)
5. Al Yosha'a (سادة آل يوشع) - Bani Hashem (بني هاشم)
6. Al Araytham (العريثم)
7. Al Tarayma (الترايمة)
8. Al Kurdi (الكردي)
9. Al Zrgan (الزرقان)
10. Al Rahal (الرحال)
11. Al Nahar (النهار)
12. Al Shahr (الشاهر)
13. Al Qoba (ال كوبع)

== Battle of Shaiba ==
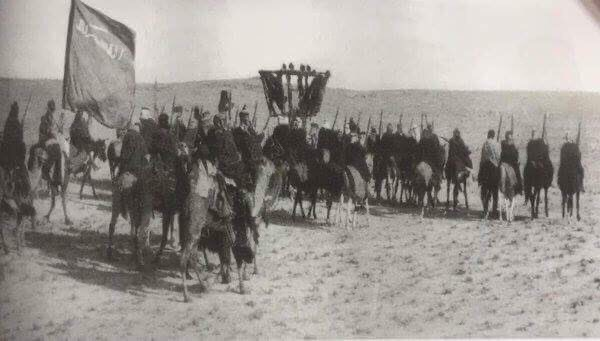
Cavalry of Al Nasrallah

The Battle of Shaiba took place during the First World War in 1915, between the British Empire, and the Ottoman Empire at an area called Shaiba near Basrah. The Albu Salih tribesmen fought alongside the Ottomans, and the Muntafiq, under the leadership of the Al Sadun family (Emirs of the Muntafiq) trying to retake back the city of Basrah from the British.

The Albu Salih fought in this battle, due to the Fatwa of Jihad that was released by religious scholars in 1914, against the foreign British forces. Although it was well known during that time, all the tribesmen of Albu Salih, as well as their leaders had a long time rivalry, and hatred towards the Ottomans.

After the Battle of Shaiba, and the loss of his two sons, Shaikh Bader vowed to never submit or surrender to the British occupation. This vow led to many other battles that took place in the years to follow.

== Shaikh Bader Al Rumaiyadh ==
Shaikh Bader Al Rumaiyadh (1845-1942)(Arabic: بدر بن عجيل بن سلمان بن ثنيان بن شدود بن حمد بن رميض) was the Shaikh of the Rumaiyadh clan from Bani Malik, and Chief of the Albu Salih confederation (hence Albu Salih originates from the Rumaiyadh's ancestor name Salih).

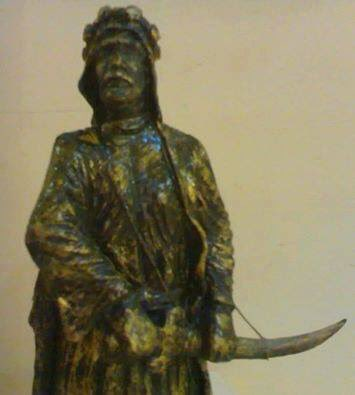
A statue of the Late Shaikh Bader Al Rumaiyadh, at a British Museum

Shaikh Bader Al Rumaiyadh was well known for his strong opposition against the British Mandate of Mesopotamia, in the early 20th century. During his reign the Albu Salih were known to be an "Anti-British" tribe.

He showed great courage, and bravery during the British occupation of southern Iraq, in the First World War. Shaikh Bader, and his people were invaded by the British forces, and expelled from their homeland. The British built a fort and named it as "Qalat Al-Fatihi". Under his leadership, his people were successful in reclaiming their land, and pushed the British forces out of their territory. He renamed the fort as "Qalat Al-Nasri". Shaikh Bader also had a major role in the 1920 Revolution.

Shaikh Bader, was a wanted outlaw for many years for defying British government orders. His son Shaikh Hasan bin Bader was his representative whenever the British government tried to negotiate with him.

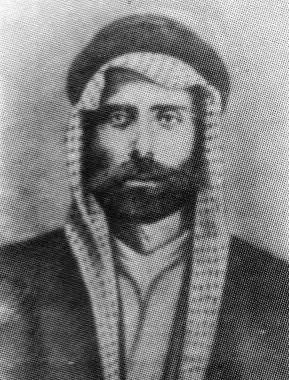
Photo of the late Shaikh Hassan Al Rumaiyadh

=== Bader Al Rumaiyadh and Colonel H.R.P Dickson ===
Colonel H.R.P Dickson describes Shaikh Bader in Kuwait and Her Neighbours (1956), as:

"So this was the aged and decrepit eighty-year-old Badr ar Rumaiyadh! I was dumbfounded, for I saw instead a well-made, thick-set man of some six feet in height, dressed in resplendent style, with gold-braided agal on his head and with handsome gold-scabbarded sword hanging by his side. In his left hand he carried a Mauser carbine, and across his chest and round his waist he wore three bandoliers stuffed full with well-oiled and glittering cartridge clips.

His walk and alert manner suggested a vigorous man in the prime of life. Only the long, square-cut, heavy beard, which reached almost to his waist and was like that worn by no Arab I knew of, suggested age.

It was scarlet-orange in colour, indicating henna dye. He was the only one who wore an 'aba over his rich garments."

"Of all Arabs I ever met, Badr ar Rumaiyadh was, I think, the strangest and most remarkable. I believe Captain Ditchburn and I were the first Englishmen ever to meet him, and I do not imagine that any of my countrymen ever saw him afterwards."

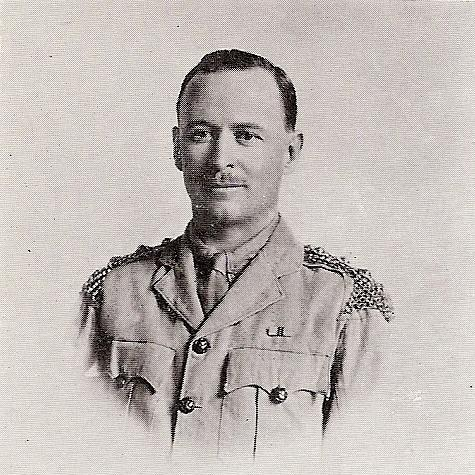
H.R.P Dickson in Kuwait 1919

Shaikh Bader had a well known reputation for his hospitality among neighbouring tribes, tribes from other parts of Iraq, and the tribes of Arabia. Some use to compare his generosity to Hatim Al-Tai.

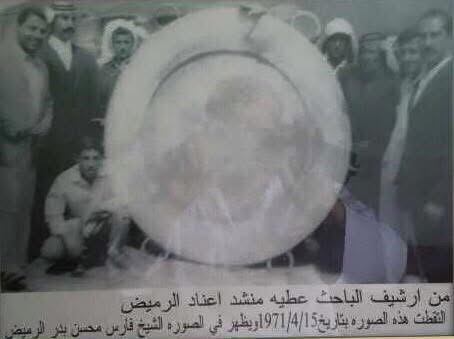
The Famous "Sahn Bader" a large feast platter used when visitors visited him - photo in 1971

== Shaikh Sulaiman Al Nasrallah ==
Shaikh Sulaiman Al Nasrallah (1885-1939) (Arabic: سليمان بن منصور بن صقر بن عبدالله بن منيخر بن سلامة بن راشد بن حمد بن نصرالله) was the Shaikh of Al Nasrallah clan that originate from the Zagareet tribe from the Abdah Section of Shammar.

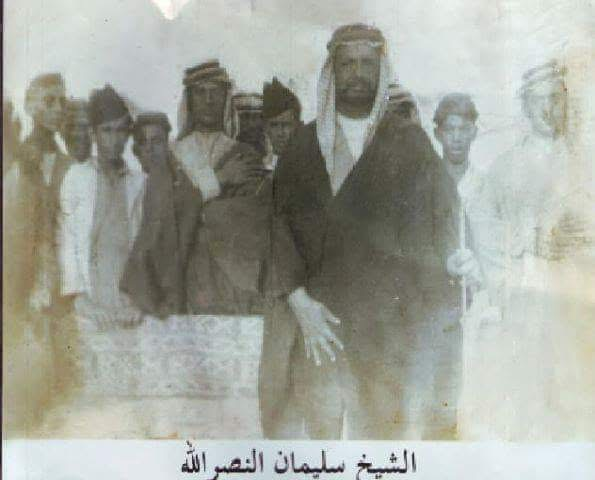
The late Shaikh Sulaiman Al Nasrallah in 1937

Shaikh Sulaiman was well known for his admiration to seek knowledge, and had a major pivotal role in bringing the Albu Salih into the 20th century. He was nominated by the British Government, and was promoted as the first Chief of the district of Islah, that he had established in 1918.

Shaikh Sulaiman left his position soon after he learned the British government's plans on undermining Shaikh Badr, and deposing him as the Shaikh of the Bani Malik. Shaikh Sulaiman revolted, and joined Shaikh Bader's ongoing rebellion.

Shaikh Sulaiman established the first school in the Islah district in 1935, he motivated his tribesmen to learn, and seek knowledge. Shaikh Sulaiman passed away in 1939, and was succeeded by his son Shaikh Mohammed bin Sulaiman.

=== Al Nasrallah Today ===
The Al Nasrallah was once a small clan, that joined the Albu Salih as an alliance, during the 19th century. The Al Nasrallah today views itself as an independent tribe, composed of many clans.

The Al Nasrallah chiefs have always maintained a good strong relationship, with the "Al-Mghamis", chiefs of their parent tribe, Al-Zagareet of Shammar.

Their current chief is Shaikh Taher Jasem Mohammed bin Sulaiman Al Nasrallah.

Al Nasrallah Clans:

1- Al Sagar (الصقر)

2- Al Abadi (العبادي)

3- Al Musbah (المصبح)

4- Al Abdan (العبدان)

5- Albu Humoud (البوحمود)

6- Albu Umayra (البو عميرة)

7- Al Safafaa (الصفافعة)

8- Al Gurnos (الكرنوص)

9- Al Jbayshat (الجبيشات)

10- Al Shamla (الشملة)

11- Al Ruwaymi (ال رويمي)

12- Al Dhuwain (ال ضويعن)

13- Albu Jeba (البوجيبة)

14- Albu Haja (البو حاجة)

15- Albu Hussein (البو حسين)

16- Al Mantash (المنتش)

17- Al Saleem (ال سليم)

18- Al Ydam (ال يدام)

19- Al Lahm (ال لحم)

20- Al Shilb (الشلب)

21- Al Fadhala (الفضالة)

== References and citations ==
=== Sources ===
- The Arab of the Desert: A Glimpse of the Badawin life in Kuwait and Sa'udi Arabia (1949) by H.R.P Dickson
- Kuwait and Her Neighbours (1956) by H.R.P Dickson
- The Muntafik. Al Sa'dun, Bani Malik, Ajwad, Bani Sa'id, Bani Huchaim (1917) - British Library: India Office Records and Private Papers
- Military Report on Iraq (Area 6 Lower Euphrates) - East India Company, the Board of Control, the India Office, or other British Government Department
- IRAQ AND THE PERSIAN GULF - East India Company, the Board of Control, the India Office, or other British Government Department
- Reports of administration for 1918 of divisions and districts of the occupied territories in Mesopotamia. Volume I - East India Company, the Board of Control, the India Office, or other British Government Department
- Relations Between Nejd And Iraq - East India Company, the Board of Control, the India Office, or other British Government Department
- Activities of Shaikh Subah al Nasir As Sabah -British Library: India Office Records and Private Papers
- Persian Gulf Diaries: Kuwait Intelligence Summaries, 1932-1936 - British Library: India Office Records and Private Papers
- Kuwait-Nejd Relations - East India Company, the Board of Control, the India Office, or other British Government Department
- The heart of Arabia, a record of travel and exploration - (1922) by Philby, H. St. J. B. (Harry St. John Bridger)
- مذكرات برترام توماس في العراق( ١٩١٨- ١٩٢٠) (١٩٨٣)-تقديم وتعليق كامل سلمان الجبوري/ترجمة عبدالهادي فنجان
- The War in the Desert - Sir John Glubb (1961)
- موسوعة العشائر العراقية المؤلف ثامر عبد الحسين العامري مجلد 4
