= 2020 Al-Habboubi Square attack =

Terrorist incident in Iraq

Al-Habboubi Square attack
- Part of the 2019–2021 Iraqi protests
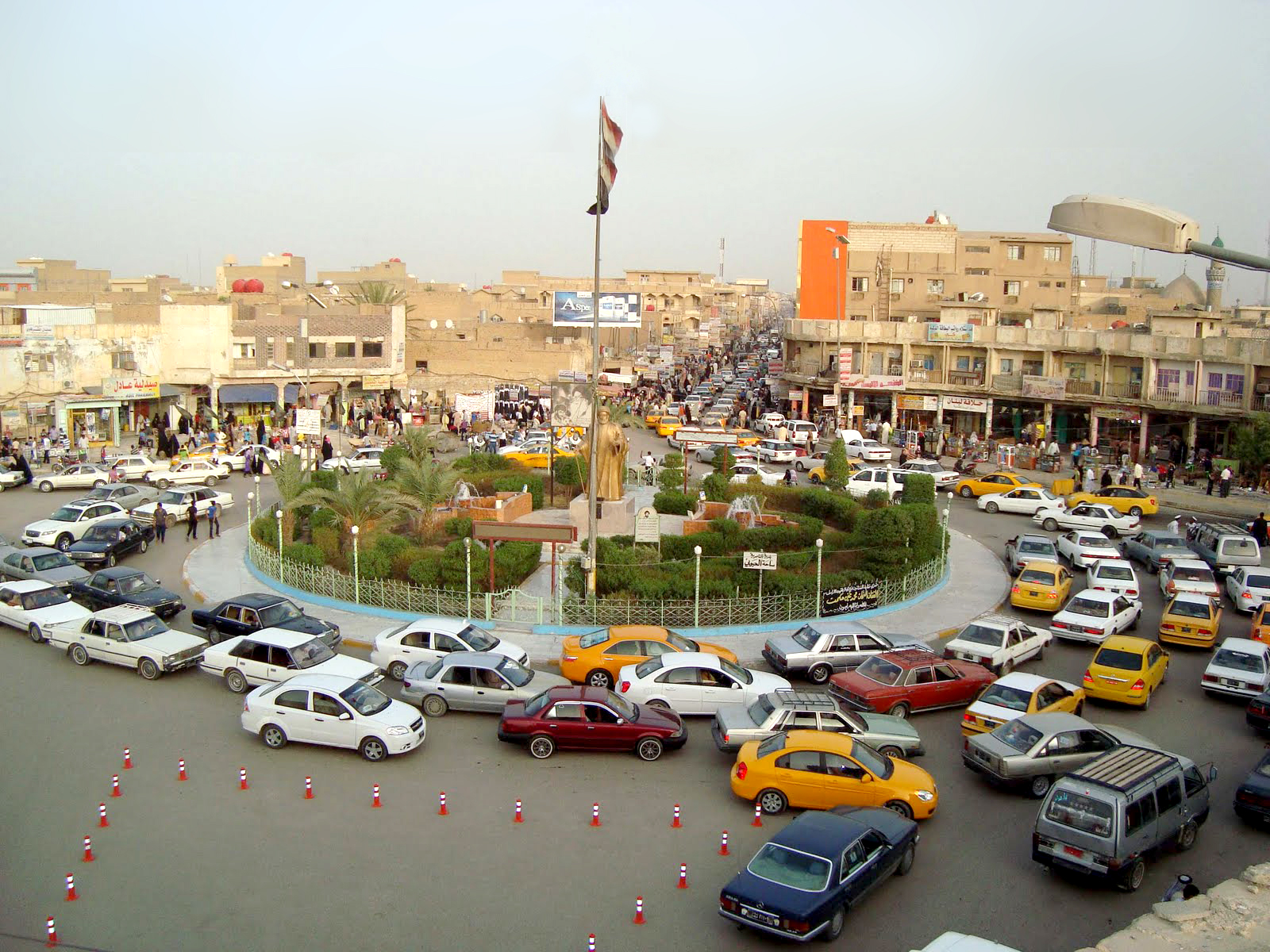
- Al-Habboubi Square before the attack
- Location: 31°03′N 46°16′E; Al-Habboubi Square, Nasiriyah, Iraq
- Date: November 27, 2020 (UTC+3 (Arabia Standard Time))
- Weapons: Guns, molotov cocktails
- Deaths: 2–8
- Injuries: 10–70
- Perpetrator: Saraya al-Salam
- Motive: Dispelling protesters

The Al-Habboubi Square attack was a violent conflict between soldiers of the Sadrist Movement's Saraya al-Salam and anti-government protesters on November 27, 2020. Located in Al-Habboubi Square, Nasiriyah, Iraq, the conflict was one of many violent uprisings in the 2019–2021 Iraqi protests.

== Attack ==
According to the Tahrir Institute for Middle East Policy, the attack was preceded by a social media post by Muhammed Saleh al-Iraqi, a social media mouthpiece for al-Sadr, telling Sadrists to "cleanse" Al-Habboubi Square of anti-government protesters.

On Friday, November 27, 2020, supporters of Iraqi Shia politician Muqtada al-Sadr gathered in Tahrir Square to demonstrate support for al-Sadr. After completing Friday prayers at noon, the group marched to Al-Habboubi Square, which was already occupied by an encampment of anti-government protesters.

It is unclear whether the anti-government protesters aggravated al-Sadr's supporters. Reports by Reuters suggest that the anti-government protesters were being peaceful, while AP News alleged the protesters camping in Al-Habboubi Square blocked the march, at which point the Sadrists opened fire on the campers. Multiple sources reported that al-Sadr's supporters shot at the protesters, threw petrol bombs into the encampment, and burned the campers' tents. The protesters retaliated, and the violence continued into Friday evening. The Tahrir Institute claimed that Saraya al-Salam, Sadr's militia, was behind the attacks, though this was not confirmed by most major news outlets.

GardaWorld reported about 60 injuries and 6 deaths, while Al Jazeera reported at least 51 wounded and 8 deaths.

Local authorities placed a curfew in Nasiriyah following the protests, with nearby locations also enforcing security measures. Middle East news outlets The National and Al-Forat News reported Iraqi Prime Minister Mustafa Al-Kadhimi dismissed the police chief of the Dhi Qar Governorate, Major Hazim Mohammed Al-Waily, after allegations that he failed to intervene in the attacks.

The Tahrir Institute reported that both al-Sadr and Saleh al-Iraqi praised the attacks, accusing anti-government protesters of being "foreign agents" and calling them derogatory names. On November 30, 2020, The National reported that security forces were being instated in the area, and anti-government protesters were rebuilding their encampment.

== See also ==
- Safaa Al Sarai
- Omar Al-Saadoun
