= Abd Al-Baqi Abd Karim Al-Sadun =

Iraqi politician (1947–2021)

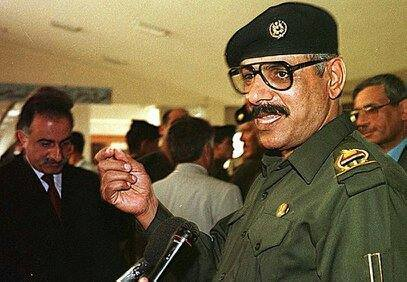
Abd Al-Baqi Al-Saadoun.

Abd Al-Baqi Abd Karim Al-Sadun (1947 – 14 December 2021) was an Iraqi politician. He was a member of the Regional Command of the Arab Socialist Ba'ath Party in Iraq, and was responsible for the Ba'ath Party organizations in the south and Diyala Governorate, and a member of the Council of Representatives of Iraq.

== Life ==
Al-Sadun belonged to the Saadoun clan, and was one of the most prominent Baathist leaders after the fall of Saddam Hussein's regime in 2003, and he was believed to have left for Syria.

He was on the U.S. list of most-wanted Iraqis until his capture. He was sentenced to death on 11 January 2016.

Al-Sadun was admitted to hospital for eye surgery where he died, on 14 December 2021, at the age of 74.
