= Al-Dhafeer =

Arab tribe

Dhafeer الظفير
- Bedouin Arab tribe
- Ethnicity: Arab
- Nisba: al-Dhafeeri
- Location: Iraq; Saudi Arabia; Kuwait; Bahrain; Syria
- Parent tribe: Tayy
- Language: Arabic
- Religion: Sunni Islam

Al-Dhafeer (Arabic: الظفير) is a Bedouin Arab tribe that descend from Tayy. The Nisba of al-Dahfeer is al-Dhafeeri (Arabic: الظفيري), They lived in the Desert of north Najd and north Bahrain (Eastern Arabia), which is the desert of south Iraq and north Saudi Arabia and north Kuwait. Before that, they lived in the desert of central Najd, and earlier they lived in the Desert east of Medina.

Most of the tribe now lives in Saudi Arabia and Kuwait taking positions such as professors, politicians, scholars, doctors and engineers. They also live in small numbers in Iraq, Syria, Qatar, Bahrain and Turkey.

== History ==
In his book Gold Alloys in the Knowledge of Arab Tribes, Muhammad Amin al-Baghdadi states that Bani Dhafir is a branch of Banu Lam from the Arabs of the Hejaz. The ancestral homes of the tribe can be traced back to areas near Medina. Al-Baghdadi, Hamad al-Jassir in his book Jamharat Ansab al-Osar in Najd, and Ibn Fadlallah al-Umari in his book Masālik al-abṣār fī mamālik al-amṣār all agree that the tribe genealogically came from Banu Lam and descended from Tayy and that they came from a place opposite Medina named al-Dhaghn. The tribe spread throughout Arabia through raiding other tribes and immigration as the tribe did not have a proper settlement. The tribe was nicknamed the "People of flowing hair and camel caravans" due to a habit of raiding alongside women and children as well as enthusiasm for their victories. Around the year 1926, then emir Ibn Saud conquered a large portion of Arabia and allowed the tribe's branch in Saudi Arabia to settle in several settlements after securing roads.

=== Persian-Bahrain conflict (1782) ===
When Bahrain was under Zand Persian control in 1782, the sheikh of the House of Khalifa at that time, Sheikh Ahmed bin Muhammad bin Khalifa, asked the Emir of Kuwait, Abdullah I, for help with men and equipment to confront the Persian rule. He addressed the tribes, and they agreed to send a group of cavalry and fighters from the Dhafeer tribe to Bahrain. Upon the arrival of the forces, fierce battles took place in what was called the Battle of Zubarah, which ended with the victory of the House of Khalifa and their allies, and the Persian control was ended.

=== Battle of Qaysar (1924) ===
On May 31, 1924, the Ikhwan forces from the Mutair tribe attacked the Dhafir tribe in the Qaysar region of the southern desert of the Kingdom of Iraq. The Dhafir tribe was able to defeat the Ikhwan forces, killing 72 of them, most notably Haif bin Shuqair al-Duwaish.

== Branches ==
Al-Dhafeer is divided into two parts:

- Ahl al-Buwait (Arabic: أهل البويت), originally a laqab belonging to al-Suwait branch due to a habit of defending refugees:
  - Al-Suwait (Arabic: السويط)
  - Al-Sa'id (Arabic: السعيد)
  - Bani Hussein (Arabic: بني حسين)
  - Al Katheer (Arabic: آل كثير)
- Ahl al-Sumada:
  - Al-Jawasim (Arabic: الجواسم)
  - Al-Thira'an (Arabic: الذرعان)
  - Al-Ma'alem (Arabic: المعاليم)
  - Al-Ma'adin (Arabic: المعادين)
  - Al-Oraif (Arabic: العريف)
  - Al-'Aljanat (Arabic: العلجانات)
  - Al-Askar (Arabic: العسكر)
