= Nasiriyah =

Nasiriyah ٱلنَّاصِرِيَّة Nassiriya Nasiriya
- City
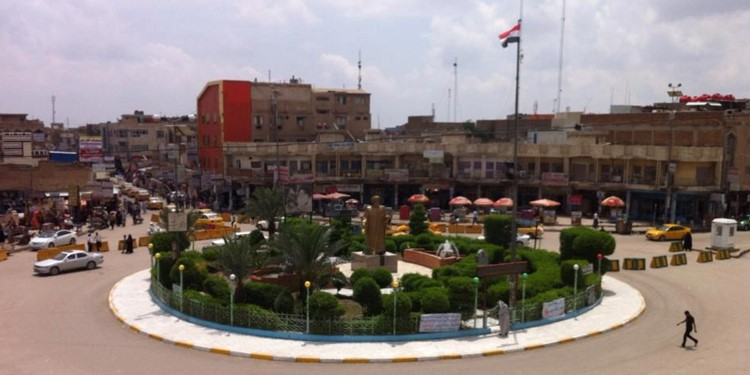
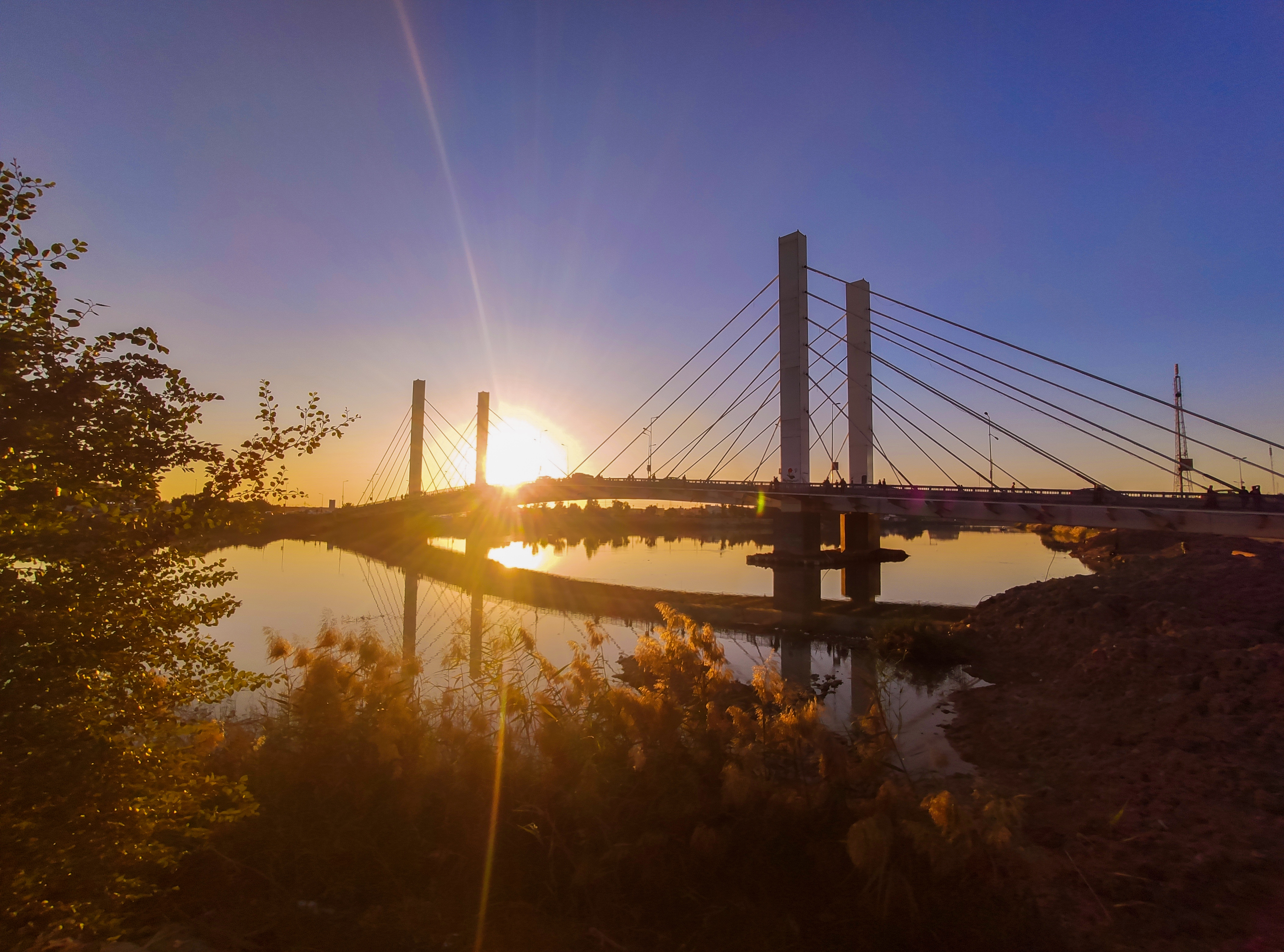
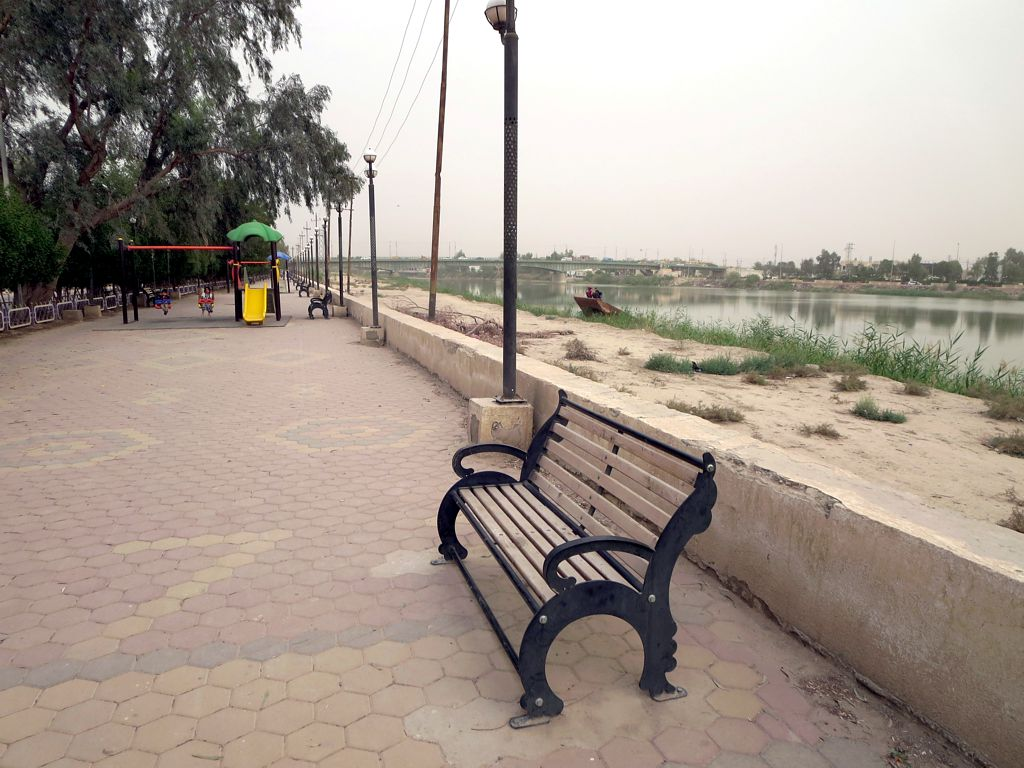
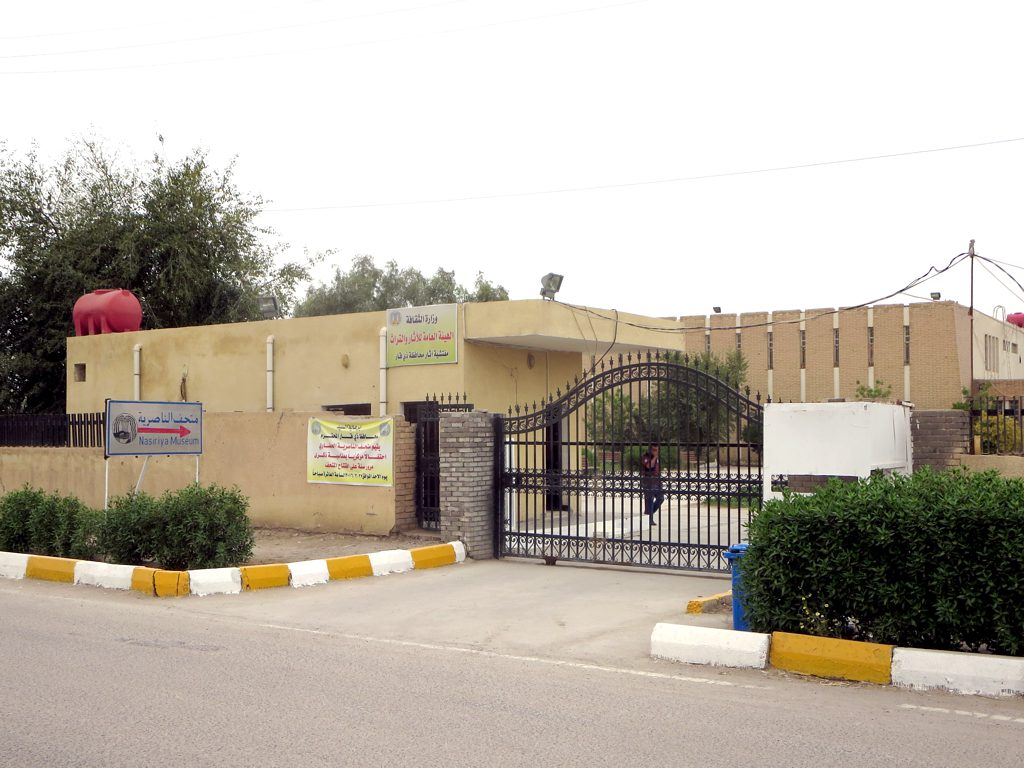
- Left to right, top to bottom: Al Haboubi Square • Bridge of Civilizations • Euphrates Corniche • Nasiriyah Museum

- Location of Nasiriyah within Iraq
- Coordinates: 31°02′38″N 46°15′27″E
- Country: Iraq
- Governorate: Dhi Qar
- District: Nasiriyah
- Established: 1872

Area
  - Total: 303 sq mi (786 km^{2})

Population (2024 census)
  - Total: 704,976
  - Density: 1,800/sq mi (700/km^{2})

Nasiriyah (UK: /ˌnæzɪˈriːə/ NAZ-irr-EE-ə, US: /ˌnɑːsɪ-/ NAH-sirr-; Arabic: ٱلنَّاصِرِيَّة, romanized: an-Nāṣiriyya, BGN: An Nāşirīyah, IPA: [ænnɑːsˤɪˈrɪjjæ]), also spelled Nassiriya or Nasiriya, is a city in Iraq, the capital of the Dhi Qar Governorate. It lies on the lower Euphrates, about 360 km (225 miles) south-southeast of Baghdad, near the ruins of the ancient city of Ur, as well as the recently established Ur Tourist City located adjacent to the archaeological site. Its population in 2024 was about 700,000, making it the ninth-largest city in Iraq. It had a diverse population of Muslims, Mandaeans and Jews in the early 20th century; today its inhabitants are predominantly Shia Muslims.

Nasiriyah was founded by the Muntafiq tribe in the late 19th century during the era of Ottoman Iraq. It has since become a major hub for transportation. Nasiriyah is the center of a date-growing area. The city's cottage industries include boat-building, carpentry and silver working. The city museum has a large collection of Sumerian, Assyrian, Babylonian, and Abbasid artifacts. The ruins of the ancient cities of Ur and Larsa are nearby and the Euphrates merges with the Tigris for the final time about 10 kilometres from the city.

== Climate ==
Nasiriyah features a hot desert climate (BWh according to the Köppen climate classification), with mild winters and very hot summers. Nasiriyah has an average annual mean of 25.0 °C (77.0 °F), an average annual high of 32.3 °C (90.1 °F) and an average annual low of 17.8 °C (64.0 °F). July, the warmest month, has a mean of 36.4 °C (97.5 °F) and an average high of 44.8 °C (112.6 °F) (August has the same average high), while the coolest month, January, has a mean of 11.6 °C (52.9 °F) and an average low of 6.2 °C (43.2 °F).

Nasiriyah receives 127.7 millimetres (5.03 in) of precipitation annually over 42 precipitation days. Summer is drier than winter, and July and August receive no precipitation at all. The wettest month and the month with the most precipitation days is January, which receives 27.4 millimetres (1.08 in) of precipitation on average over 7 precipitation days.

Climate data for Nasiriya (1991–2020, extremes 1940-1976)
Month	Jan	Feb	Mar	Apr	May	Jun	Jul	Aug	Sep	Oct	Nov	Dec	Year
Record high °C (°F)	29.3 (84.7)	32.6 (90.7)	39.3 (102.7)	42.8 (109.0)	46.2 (115.2)	48.3 (118.9)	49.5 (121.1)	49.4 (120.9)	48.9 (120.0)	43.9 (111.0)	36.7 (98.1)	28.2 (82.8)	49.5 (121.1)
Mean daily maximum °C (°F)	18.2 (64.8)	21.2 (70.2)	26.8 (80.2)	33.0 (91.4)	39.6 (103.3)	44.2 (111.6)	46.7 (116.1)	46.5 (115.7)	43.0 (109.4)	36.4 (97.5)	26.3 (79.3)	20.1 (68.2)	33.5 (92.3)
Daily mean °C (°F)	12.3 (54.1)	15.1 (59.2)	20.1 (68.2)	25.9 (78.6)	32.5 (90.5)	36.7 (98.1)	37.9 (100.2)	38.2 (100.8)	34.4 (93.9)	28.3 (82.9)	19.4 (66.9)	13.9 (57.0)	26.8 (80.2)
Mean daily minimum °C (°F)	6.9 (44.4)	8.9 (48.0)	13.5 (56.3)	18.9 (66.0)	24.7 (76.5)	27.7 (81.9)	29.5 (85.1)	29.2 (84.6)	25.7 (78.3)	20.7 (69.3)	13.3 (55.9)	8.6 (47.5)	19.0 (66.2)
Record low °C (°F)	−7.2 (19.0)	−3.9 (25.0)	−0.3 (31.5)	3.6 (38.5)	11.6 (52.9)	18.2 (64.8)	20.0 (68.0)	16.1 (61.0)	14.2 (57.6)	7.8 (46.0)	−1.6 (29.1)	−5.0 (23.0)	−7.2 (19.0)
Average precipitation mm (inches)	21.4 (0.84)	14.7 (0.58)	19.5 (0.77)	15.0 (0.59)	3.3 (0.13)	0.0 (0.0)	0.0 (0.0)	0.0 (0.0)	0.9 (0.04)	7.3 (0.29)	22.6 (0.89)	21.9 (0.86)	126.6 (4.98)
Average precipitation days (≥ 0.1 mm)	6.6	5.4	7.1	7.5	4.3	0.2	0	0	0.1	2.6	6.4	7.2	47.4
Average relative humidity (%)	65.8	56.7	46.4	39.4	28.0	20.6	19.6	21.3	25.5	36.3	54.0	64.6	39.8
Source: NOAA, DWD(precipitaion days 1941-1970, extremes)

Climate data for Nasiriyah (2015-2022 extreme temperatures)
Month	Jan	Feb	Mar	Apr	May	Jun	Jul	Aug	Sep	Oct	Nov	Dec	Year
Record high °C (°F)	25.0 (77.0)	32.6 (90.7)	40.4 (104.7)	44.5 (112.1)	49.4 (120.9)	51.0 (123.8)	52.6 (126.7)	51.8 (125.2)	49.6 (121.3)	44.5 (112.1)	36.0 (96.8)	31.6 (88.9)	52.6 (126.7)
Record low °C (°F)	−2.5 (27.5)	−0.4 (31.3)	5.0 (41.0)	8.8 (47.8)	18.5 (65.3)	19.0 (66.2)	27.0 (80.6)	26.2 (79.2)	22.0 (71.6)	14.0 (57.2)	7.8 (46.0)	0.6 (33.1)	−2.5 (27.5)

== History ==
=== Establishment and Ottoman era ===
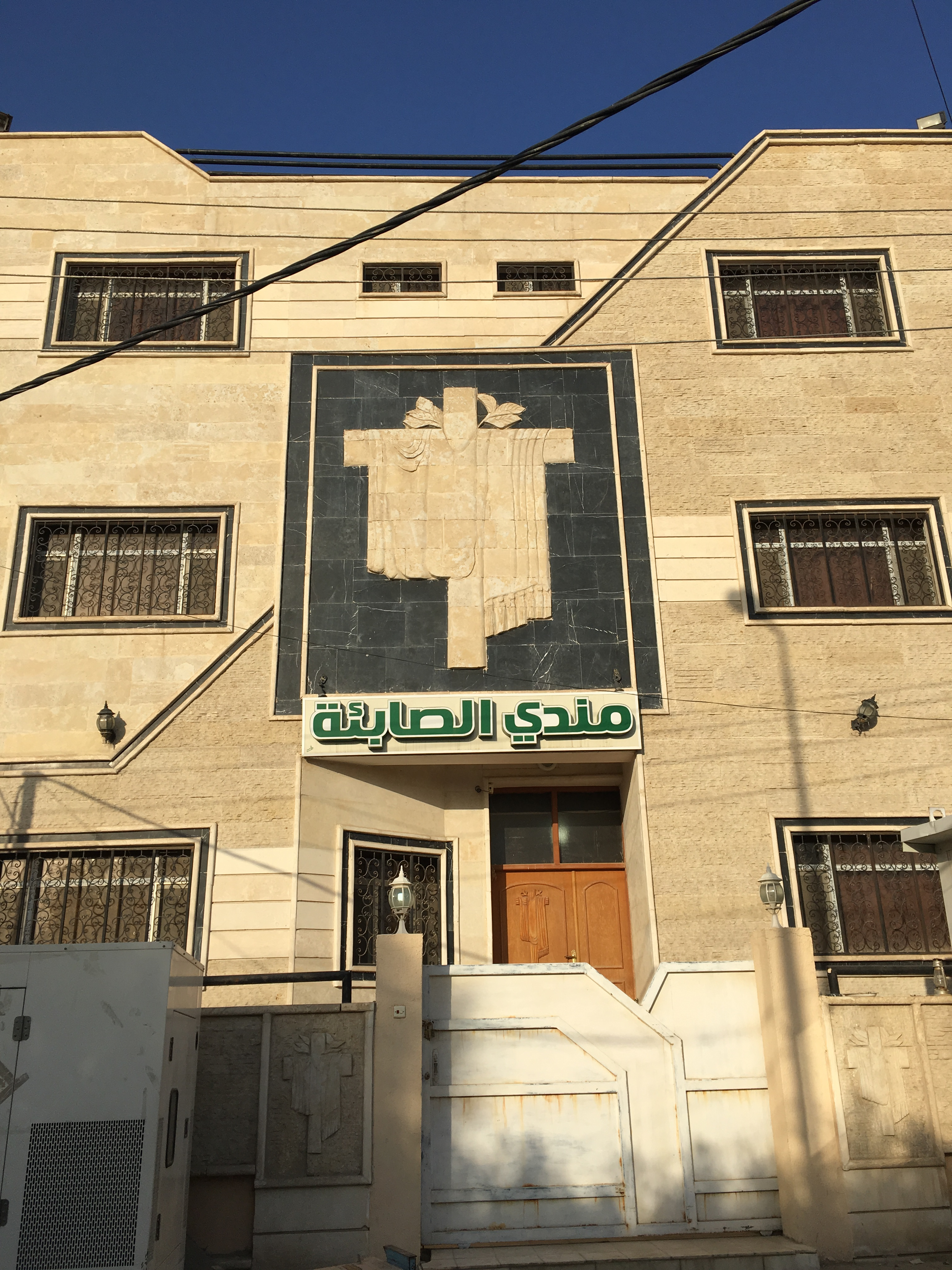
Mandaean beth manda (house of worship) in Nasiriyah, 2016

Nasiriyah was founded in 1872 by Nasir al-Sadoon Pasha (Arabic: ناصر السعدون باشا), from the Al Sa'dun family and thus the sheikh ("chief") of the Muntafiq tribal confederation, after whom the city was named. During that same year, it became the administrative center of the Muntafiq sanjak ("district").

Belgian architect, Jules Tilly, was commissioned to develop a modern urban plan for the city. Tilly introduced a Western-style grid layout, characterised by long, straight, and parallel streets intersecting at right angles, unprecedented in Iraq at the time. This planning approach shaped the city’s infrastructure and facilitated the orderly growth of roads and residential plots, which were arranged in rectangular clusters, consequently, the flat topography of the region made this layout particularly effective. Tilly placed great emphasis on urban aesthetics and functionality, incorporating central squares, wide sidewalks, and public gardens into the design. These green spaces quickly became popular as communal resting areas and contributed to the city’s distinctive charm. Tilly’s urban plan received the approval of Medhat Pasha, who praised its elegance, modernity, and engineering ingenuity. The first structure built under Tilly’s plan was the Government House in 1872, which served as the administrative center until its demolition in 1950.

Nasir Pasha was the head of the Sunni Muslim al-Saadun clan, which was the ruling family of the Muntafiq whose tribesmen were mostly Shia Muslims. At the time of Nasiriyah's founding, Muntafiq power in the Basra Vilayet (southern Iraq) had increasingly given way to Ottoman centralization. However, Nasir Pasha was appointed by the Ottomans as the head of the vilayet (province) and registered large tracts of land around Nasiriyah into his name. His son, Saadun Pasha, became the mutassarif (tax collector) of Nasiriyah, and by 1908, he virtually governed southern Iraq on their behalf, having curried their favor by strongly supporting the 1908 Young Turk Revolution.

It was a major center of trade in Ottoman Iraq and imported foreign goods via commerce with Baghdad and Basra. The chief commodities Nasiriyah produced included leather, grain and ghee. The town contained about 600 well-built stone houses, but most buildings and homes were constructed from mud brick. There were about 350 shops in Nasiriyah as well as five khans (inns). The area surrounding the town was abundant in date palms and grain fields. The town was not protected by a wall like other major administrative centers. In addition to the administrative functions it played for the Muntafiq district, Nasiriyah served as a government outpost and settlement in a generally nomadic region dominated by local Bedouin tribes.

=== British and Hashemite rule ===
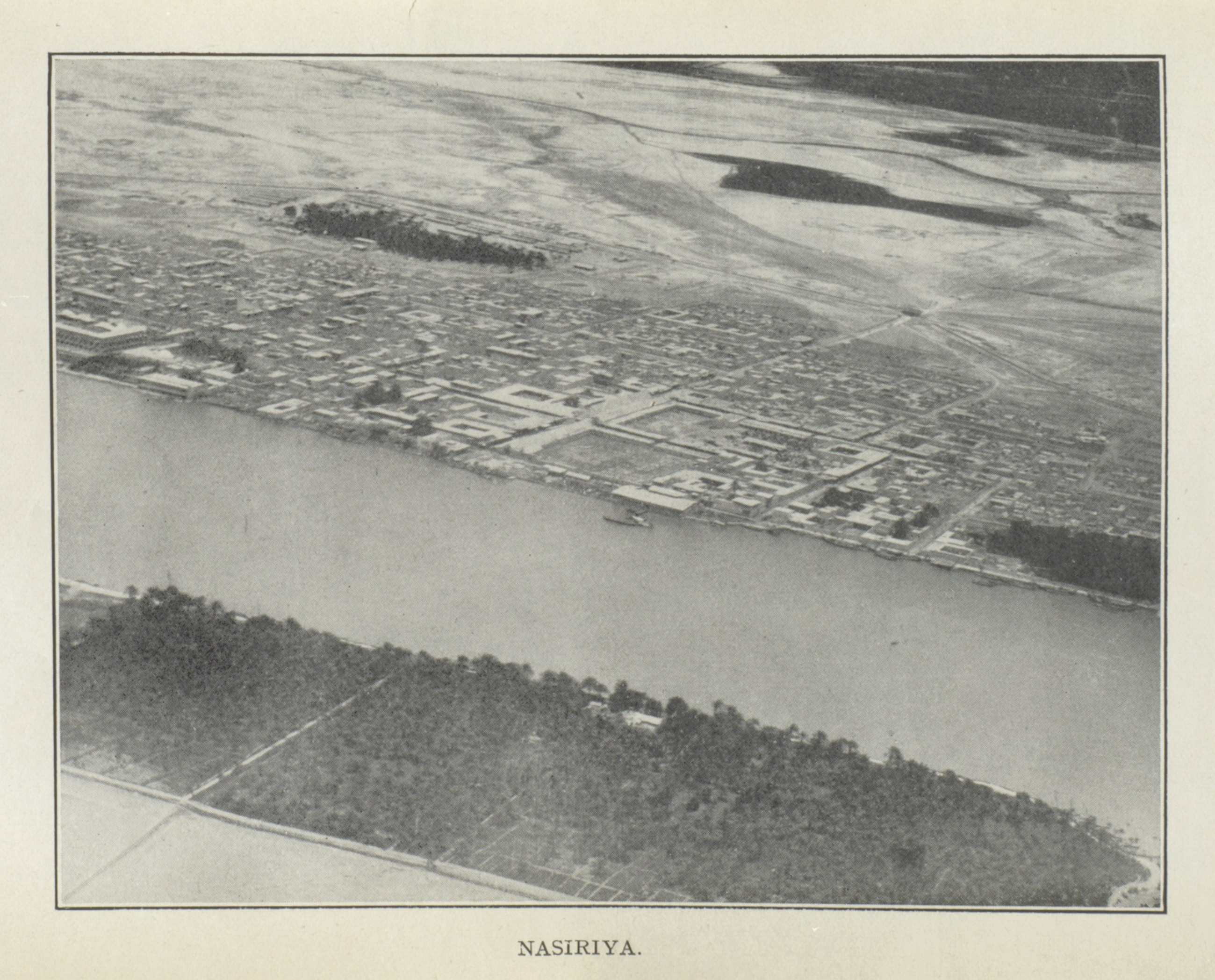
Nasiriyah as seen from a British airplane in 1923

During World War I, the British conquered the city, controlled at the time by the Ottoman Empire, in July 1915. Some 400 British and Indian and up to 2,000 Turkish soldiers were killed in the battle for Nasiriyah on 24 July 1915.

In 1920, Nasiriyah had 6,523 inhabitants. The population was ethnically diverse with Arab Muslims accounting for 72.7% of the inhabitants, Jews 8%, Mandeans 9.7%, Persians 4.6%, Lurs 4.3% and Christians, Turks, and Indians forming the remainder of the population.

The Iraqi Communist Party's first cell was founded in Nasiriyah by Yusuf Salman Yusuf (known as "Fahd") in the 1930s. It was also the birthplace of Fuad al-Rikabi, who founded the Iraqi Baath Party in the 1950s. At the time, the Iraqi Baath consisted mostly of people from Nasiriyah, namely Rikabi's relatives and associates.

=== Gulf War ===
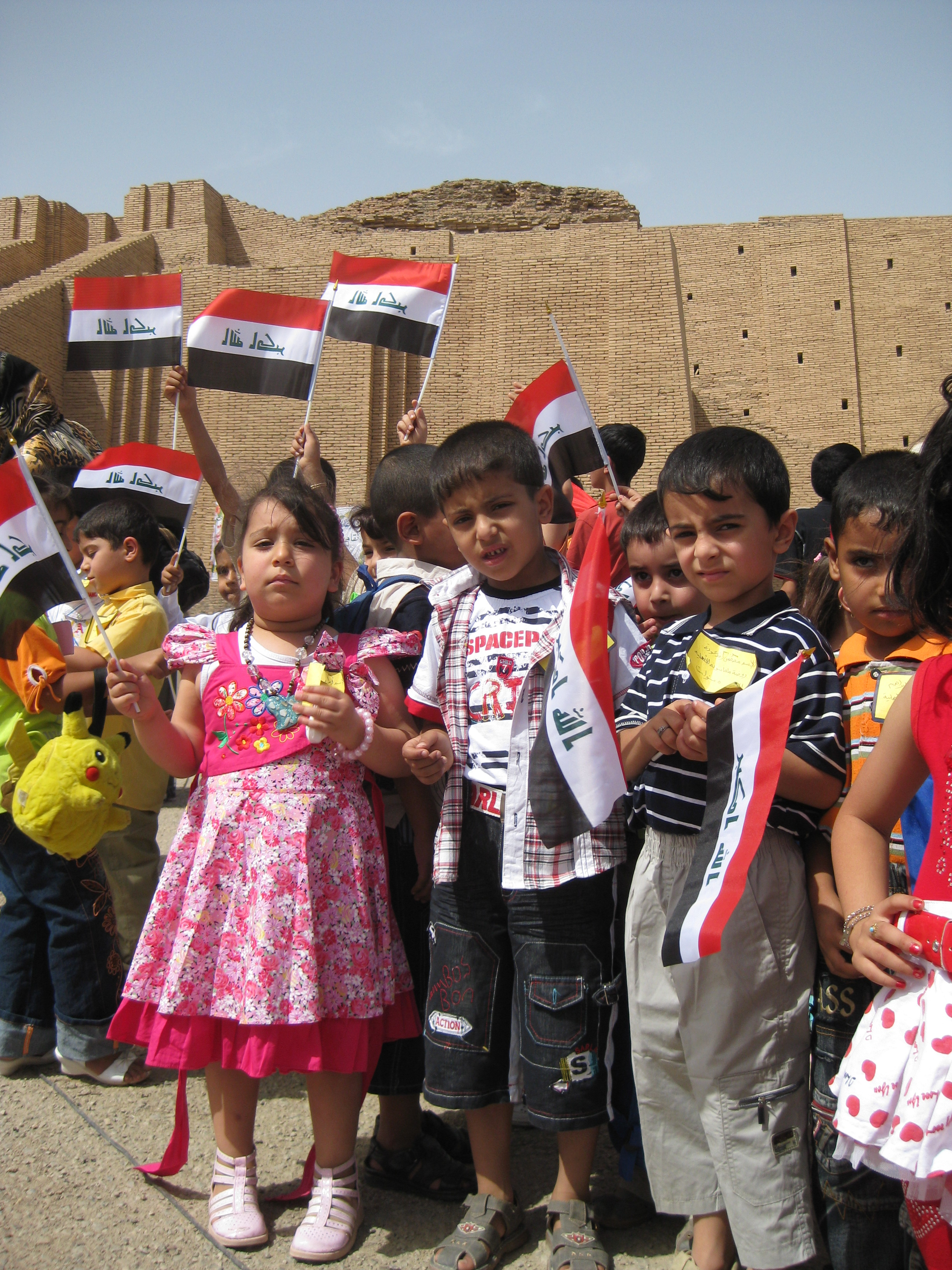
Kindergarten students from Mumsuna school in Nasiriyah attend the opening of Ziggurat of Ur in 2009 (it had been closed following the U.S. invasion in 2003).

During the 1991 Gulf War, Nasiriyah marked the furthest point to which coalition forces penetrated Iraq, with the United States 82nd Airborne Division and elements of the 101st Airborne Division reaching the main road just outside the city. In March 1991, following the American withdrawal at the war's end, the Shia population of Nasiriyah took part in the revolt against the rule of Iraqi president Saddam Hussein. The revolt was violently subdued by the Iraqi military with heavy loss of life and much physical damage. Many of its inhabitants were massacred by Iraqi government forces.

Until the 2003 Iraq War, Nasiriyah was home to one of the largest communities of Mandaeans in Iraq. In Nasiriyah, Mandaeans mostly lived in the "Subba Quarter" (Arabic: منطقة الصابئة, lit. 'Sabian Zone'), located on the northern banks of the Euphrates River.

=== Iraq War ===
In March 2003, Nasiriyah was one of the first major battles of the 2003 US invasion of Iraq. Phillip Mitchell of the International Institute for Strategic Studies so described the town's strategic importance to The Guardian:

Nasiriyah is a major administrative headquarters and is also [Iraqi General] Majid's military district headquarters. It is a major strategic crossing point of the Euphrates. For all those reasons Nasiriyah will be well defended, which will slow the Mech [invasion] down for a while.

— Phillip Mitchell, Gains in south spur thrust in Baghdad – The Guardian

On March 23, the U.S. invasion force was ambushed near the city: 11 US soldiers were killed and Army Private Jessica Lynch, Army Private Lori Piestewa and Specialist Shoshana Johnson were taken prisoners of war during the skirmishes. The Battle of Nasiriyah between Iraqi forces and the 2nd Marine Expeditionary Brigade under the call sign "Task Force Tarawa" of the U.S. Marine Corps lasted between about March 23 and March 29, in which 18 Marines were killed and over 150 were wounded, including a number hit by friendly fire from Air Force A‑10 aircraft, but the Iraqi resistance was defeated fairly rapidly thereafter. The town has been relatively calm since the fall of Saddam Hussein. A truck bomb killed 18 Italian soldiers and 11 civilians in November 2003 (see 2003 Nasiriyah bombing), and clashes erupted here in April 2004.

== See also ==
- Al-Habboubi Square
- 2020 Al-Habboubi Square attack
- Ali Air Base
- List of places in Iraq
- Minorities in Iraq
- Nasiriyah Central Prison
- Nasiriyah Heart Center
- Iraqi conflict (2003–present)

== Bibliography ==
- Al-Ali, Nadge Sadig (2007), Iraqi Women: Untold Stories From 1948 to the Present, Zed Books, ISBN 9781842777459, archived from the original on 17 July 2024
- Dabrowska, Karen; Hann, Geoff (2008), Iraq Then and Now: A Guide to the Country and Its People, Bradt Travel Guides, ISBN 9781841622439, archived from the original on 15 October 2023
- Anthropological Series, vol. 30, Field Museum of Natural History, 1940, archived from the original on 15 October 2023
- Çetinsaya, Gökhan (2006), The Ottoman Administration of Iraq, 1890–1908, Routledge, ISBN 9781134294954, archived from the original on 15 October 2023
- Dickson, H.R.P. (1949), The Arab of the Desert (RLE Saudi Arabia): A Glimpse Into Badawin Life in Kuwait and Saudi Arabia, Routledge, ISBN 9781317540007, archived from the original on 11 October 2021
- Lorimer, John Gordon (1915), Gazetteer of the Persian Gulf, 'Oman, and Central Arabia, Superintendent Government Printing, archived from the original on 18 May 2015
- Ismael, Tareq Y. (2008), The Rise and Fall of the Communist Party of Iraq, Cambridge University Press, 2008, ISBN 9780521873949, archived from the original on 15 October 2023
- Mockaitis, Thomas R. (2013), The Iraq War Encyclopedia, ABC-CLIO, ISBN 9780313380631, archived from the original on 15 October 2023
