= Saadoun Jaber =

Iraqi singer

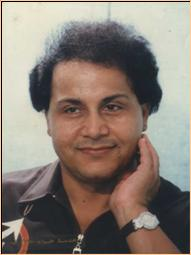
- Born: 1950 (age 75–76); Amarah, Maysan Governorate, Iraq
- Known for: Singer, oud player

Saadoun Jaber (born 1950) is an Iraqi singer, oud songwriter, and oud player. Known as the "Ambassador of the Iraqi song", he is considered among the most successful Iraqi artists across the Arab world. Jaber portrayed folk singer Masoud El Amaratly in a 1996 television special.

== Early life ==
Saadoun was born in the Ali Al-Gharbi District of Maysan Governorate in the south of Iraq. His musical inspirations were Abdel Halim Hafez and other Arab artists. In the year 1963, he began singing on the radio on the show "Amateurs' Corner" (Arabic: ركن الهواة), which had been a starting point for many other Iraqi artists, notably Fadel Awwad.

== Education ==
Saadoun graduated with a degree in English literature at Al-Mustansiriya University in Baghdad. He then enrolled in oud classes at the Institute of Fine Arts in 1985.
