= Abdul Rahim al-Rahmani =

Abd al-Rahim Al-Rahmani
- عبد الرحيم الرحماني
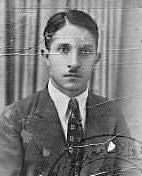
- al-Rahmani in 1937
- Born: Abd al-Rahim Abd al-Rahman Abd al-Nabi al-Sharifi; 1904; Amarah, Ottoman Empire
- Died: April 8, 2003 (aged 98–99); Baghdad, Iraq
- Notable work: al-Asriya Bookstore

Abd al-Rahim Abd al-Rahman al-Sharifi (Arabic: عبد الرحيم عبد الرحمن الشريفي; 1904 – April 8, 2003), known as Abdul Rahim al-Rahmani, was an Iraqi writer, bookman, and the founder of the first bookstore and cinema in Maysan.

== Biography ==
al-Rahmani was born in 1904 to Abd al-Rahman al-Sharifi and Munawwar al-Sharifi. He hails from a prominent merchant family that lived in Karkh, Baghdad. He is the second of four children. His father moved to Amarah in the 19th century and settled there. He grew up and studied in Amarah. In 1922, he went to Baghdad to complete his bachelor's degree, and then returned to Amarah.

In 1950, al-Rahmani opened the first cinema in Amarah, named al-Amir. The first screening was of a film about the plight of the Palestinians, named Fatat Min Filastin (transl. A girl from Palestine; 1948), directed by Mahmud Thulfiqar. On July 18, 1958, al-Rahmani's son, Dawood changed the name of the cinema to al-Thawrah, in honour of the 14 July revolution.

== al-Asriya Bookstore ==
al-Rahmani's first book selling venture was in 1922, where he opened a store that became the first of its kind in Maysan. He sold newspapers, magazines and stationery, and it was known as Abd al-Rahim al-Rahmani's bookstore. Then on October 5, 1929, al-Rahmani did a merger with Mahmud Hilmi, founder of the famous al-Maktaba al-Asriya (Arabic: المكتبة العصرية) in Baghdad in 1914, who was planning to spread his brand across Iraq, by establishing branches in different Iraqi cities. Hence after the merger, al-Rahmani's bookstore was known as al-Maktaba al-Asriya. Over time, all of the other branches closed down, except for al-Rahmani's, and it remains open until this day in the Grand Souq in Amarah, under the administration of Haidar Husayn.

The bookstore became the main attraction for the intellectuals of the city, especially the likes of writer Dr. Malek al-Muttalibi, screenwriter Abd al-Razzaq al-Muttalibi, novelist Abid-Awn al-Rowdhan, poet Dr. Fadhel al-Sudani, actors Dr. Fadhel Khalil and Samir Khalil, poet Isa Hasan al-Yasiri, and others.

The bookstore was used as a mailbox, where scholars and intellectuals would receive their mail at the bookstore. As well as that, it used the shopfront as a bulletin for advertising the literary work of rising writers, free of charge, to support the literary movement in the city. It was also an unofficial forum for writers and poets, and the most renowned attendee was Muhammad-Mehdi al-Jawaheri, during the time he was residing at his farm near Ali al-Gharbi. Upon one of his visits to the store, he asked for a literacy book (al-Khaldunia), and when al-Rahmani asked him why he wanted the book, al-Jawaheri said he wanted to use it to teach his farmers how to read and write.

The bookstore has also published many leading books including Tarikh al-Asha'er (History of the Tribes) by Muhammad-Baqir al-Jalali, and Asha'er Maysan (Tribes of Maysan) by Jabbar al-Jueybri.

== Personal life ==
al-Rahmani married Khilfa al-Milliya, the daughter of Sheikh Baqir al-Milliya in 1933. He had seven children, five sons and two daughters. Sami is the oldest who died in 2005. His son Dawood is a poet. His sons Riyadh, and Ali are both geologists.

Adolf Hitler's stance against the British had a massive appeal on Iraqis. al-Rahmani who did not admire him for his personality or Nazism, did for his Anglophobia. This appeal inspired al-Rahmani to don the toothbrush moustache, and go as far as to name his newborn, Hitler. On September 28, 1938, he had a baby son, and decided to name him Hitler. He was met with disdain from the Jews of Amarah, and they stopped visiting his home. A while later, Hitler fell ill, and his mother and aunties believed it was from the curses of the Jewish ladies. To his displeasure, al-Rahmani's wife forced him to rename their son, and they called him Samir. However, the child died a few months later.

== Death ==
Al-Rahmani died on the eve of the US invasion of Iraq, on April 8, 2003.
