= Ali Al Sharqi =

Coordinates: 32°07′41″N 46°43′41″E

Ali Al Sharqi (Arabic: علي الشرقي) is a town in Maysan province, Iraq. It lies 60 kilometres (37 mi) from the city of Amarah. It contains the Imam Ali Al Sharqi Mosque.
