= Kaabour =

Kaabour (قعبور) is an Arabic surname from Lebanon. Notable people with the surname include:

- Ahmad Kaabour (1955–2026), Lebanese singer, composer and actor
- Mahmoud Kaabour (born 1979), Lebanese filmmaker, writer and public speaker
- Marwan Kaabour (born 1987), Lebanese graphic designer, artist and editor, son of Ahmad
