= Amara District =

Amarah District قضاء العمارة
- District
- Interactive map of Amarah District
- Location within Iraq
- Country: Iraq
- Governorate: Maysan Governorate
- Seat: Amarah

Population
  - Total: 719,898
- Time zone: UTC+3 (AST)

Amarah District (Arabic: قضاء العمارة) is one of the six districts in Maysan Governorate, Iraq. The city of Amarah is the seat of the district, and its largest city. The district's population is 719,898 people.
