= Isa Hasan al-Yasiri =

Iraqi-Canadian poet

- عيسى حسن الياسري
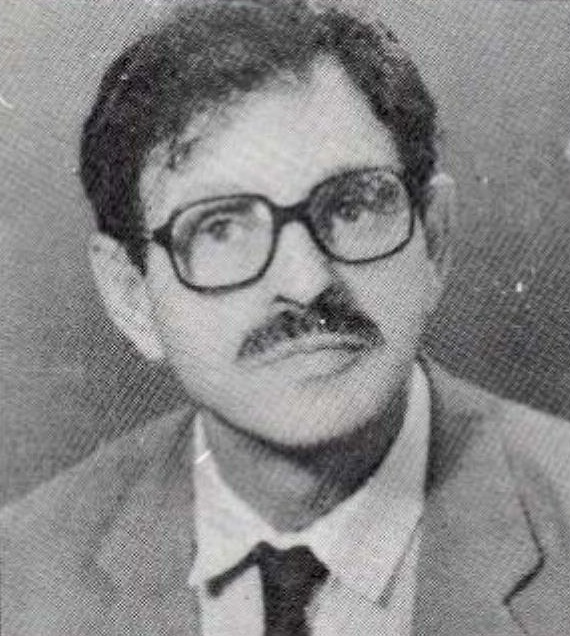
- Al-Yasiri c. early 1970s
- Born: 1942 (age 83–84); Kumait, Maysan, Kingdom of Iraq
- Occupations: Poet; journalist
- Writing career
- Language: Arabic, French

Isa Hasan al-Yasiri (Note: Also spelled Issa Hassan Al-Yasiri and Aisa Alyasiri) (Arabic: عيسى حسن الياسري, romanized: ʻĪsá Ḥasan al-Yāsirī; born 1942) is an Iraqi-Canadian poet. He was born in a village in southern Iraq, located near the town of Al-Kumait in the Maysan Governorate. He completed his primary education between the village school and Al-Kumait school, and intermediate and higher education in the Teachers' House in Al-Amarah. After graduating, he worked in education, radio and literary journalism. Among his generation, Al-Yasiri is distinguished in his poetry and personal life for exclusivity and independence from the Iraqi Ba'athist authority. He left his country in the fall of 1998, and lived in Jordan for two and a half years before arriving in Canada at the beginning of 2001 and moving to Montreal. He has published approximately eight poetry collections, beginning in 1973.

== Biography ==
Isa Hasan Hashim al-Yasiri was born in a village near to Kumait, Maysan Governorate in 1942. When he was ten years old, he ran away from school without the knowledge of his family to the village of his maternal uncles. He traveled there with a caravan of camels, walking with them all night long. He stated years later at the age of 74 that he had defined his childhood self-concept based on freedom, and "I live with all the foolishness of children, their futility, their lack of interest in possessions, their naivety, their dangerous adventures. Otherwise, what would explain my arrival at the polar edges of the world if not a childish adventure more like the adventure of my escape from school?" He completed his primary education until the sixth grade at the Kumait Elementary School, then intermediate in Al-Amarah. After completing his secondary education, he received a diploma in education from the Elementary Teachers' House in al-Amara in 1963. He worked first as a schoolteacher, and then as head of the cultural department at the Iraqi Radio and Television Organization, editor and then head of the cultural department at Alif Ba' magazine, head of the literary department in Al-Iraq newspaper, and finally as editorial secretary for Asfar magazine.

He was a member of the Union of Iraqi Writers, attended the Goethe World Festival in Germany in 1975 and the Arab Writers Union Conference in Damascus in 1979. He was arrested in the autumn of 1982 after returning to Baghdad from Italy for one month. He left his job in journalism to work as a petition writer before Adhamiya Court in Baghdad from 1992 to 1998. Al-Yasiri stopped publishing his poetry from 1982 to 1991. He immigrated from Ba'athist Iraq to Jordan in 1998 and lived there until 2000. In the following year, he arrived Canada, where he resided in Winnipeg and then moved permanently to Montreal, Quebec. As a Canadian he became a member of Union des écrivaines et des écrivains québécois from 2018, Quebec Writers' Federation from 2019 and was a member of the Writers' Union of Canada from 2012 to 2016.

== Personal life ==
Among his children is Yasir Isa al-Yasiri (born 1967 in Wasit), a university professor and journalist.

== Awards ==
- 2002 : Prize “the free word” from Poets of All Nations (PAN) during the International Festival of Poetry in Rotterdam, Netherlands.
- 2008 :Phoenix International Prize, from Dar al-Qissa in Iraq for his novel, The Days of Muhssineh’s Village.

== Works ==
In 2017, his complete poetic works were published in one volume by the Arab Institute for Studies and Publishing in Beirut, comprising eleven collections of poetry written in Iraq, Jordan and Canada. A translation of some of his poems to English was published in Feathers and the horizon : a selection of modern poetry from across the Arab world by the Australian critic Anne Fairbairn, in 1989. Al-Yasiri poetry collections including:

- Arabic: العبور إلى مدن الفرح, romanized: al-ʻUbūr ilá mudun al-faraḥ, 1973
- Arabic: فصول في رحلة طائر الجنوب, romanized: Fuṣūl min riḥlat ṭāʼir al-janūb, 1976
- Arabic: سماء جنوبيّة, romanized: Samāʼ janūbīyah، 1979
- Arabic: المرأة مملكتي, romanized: al-Marʼah mamlakatī، 1982
- Arabic: شتاء المراعي, romanized: Šitāʾ al-marāʿī، 1992
- Arabic: صمت الأكواخ, romanized: Ṣamt al-akwākh، 1996
- Arabic: أناديكِ من مكان بعيد, 2008
- Arabic: السلام عليك يا مريم, romanized: al-Salāmu ʻalayki yā Maryam, 2012

Translations of his collections:

- Arabic: أغاني الغروب, French, 2018
- Arabic: صلاة بدائية من أجل أوروك, romanized: Ṣalāẗ bi-dāʼyaẗ min aǧl Ūrūk, Spanish, 2019
- Arabic: كاتدرائية بغداد, Spanish,

Novels:

- Arabic: لوحات ريفية, romanized: Lawḥā rīfīyah, lit. 'Rural paintings'
- Arabic: أيام قرية المحسنة, romanized: Ayyām qaryat al-Muḥsinah, lit. 'The Days of Muhssineh’s Village.', 2004
