= Imam Ali Al Sharqi Mosque =

Mosque in the Maysan Governorate, Iraq

- مسجد الإمام علي الشرقي
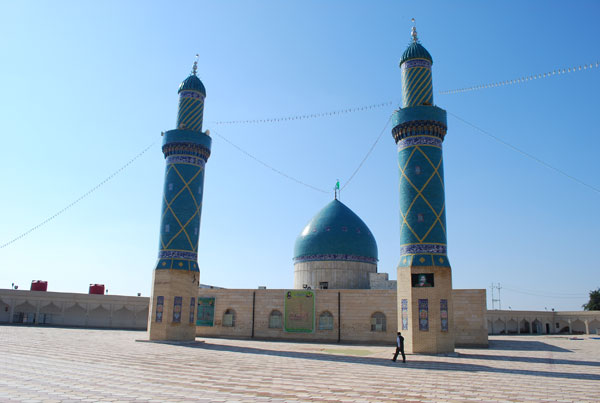
- The mosque in 2013

- Location of the mosque in Iraq

Religion
- Affiliation: Islam
- Ecclesiastical or organizational status: Mosque; Mausoleum
- Status: Active

Location
- Location: Ali Al Sharqi, Maysan Governorate
- Country: Iraq
- Interactive map of Imam Ali Al Sharqi Mosque
- Coordinates: 32°07′09″N 46°43′50″E

Architecture
- Type: Islamic architecture
- Completed: 1885 CE (mausoleum); 1959 CE (mosque)

Specifications
- Dome: One
- Minaret: Two

The Imam Ali Al Sharqi Mosque (Arabic: مسجد الإمام علي الشرقي) is a mosque and mausoleum, located on the eastern bank of the Tigris River in the city of Ali Al Sharqi, in the Maysan Governorate of Iraq. The mosque was named in honor of Sayyid Ali al-Sharji, known locally as Ali al-Sharqi, an 11th-century saint, who was buried in the mausoleum. The mosque was established in 1959 as a replacement of the 1885 mausoleum.

== History ==
=== Sayyid Ali al-Sharji ===
Sayyid Ali al-Sharji was a descendant of the fourth Rashidun caliph, Ali ibn Abi Talib, through his son Hasan ibn Ali. He was a cousin of the famed Sunni scholar and Sufi mystic 'Abd al-Qadir al-Jilani. The exact period of time he lived in is not clear, however 'Abd al-Karim al-Nadwi wrote that Sayyid Ali al-Sharji was a contemporary of the Abbasid caliph, al-Qadir and lived in the 11th century. According to Ibn 'Inaba, a genealogist and scholar, Sayyid Ali al-Sharji was from the Hijaz and migrated to Iraq from there in the late 10th century. He is known locally as Ali al-Sharqi, the epithet al-Sharqi meaning "eastern one" because of the presence of his grave on the east of the Tigris River.

=== Construction of the mosque ===
The mausoleum of Ali al-Sharji was a dilapidated domed structure surrounded by a large forest. The forest was later cleared for urbanisation in 1885 and then plans were made for a larger shrine complex to replace the outdated structure. In 1950, a courtyard was built around the shrine for shelter of the visitors. The mausoleum was eventually demolished and, in 1959, replaced with a new, large mosque over the grave of Sayyid Ali al-Sharji.

== See also ==
- Islam in Iraq
- List of mosques in Iraq
