= Inam Al-Rubaie =

Iraqi actress

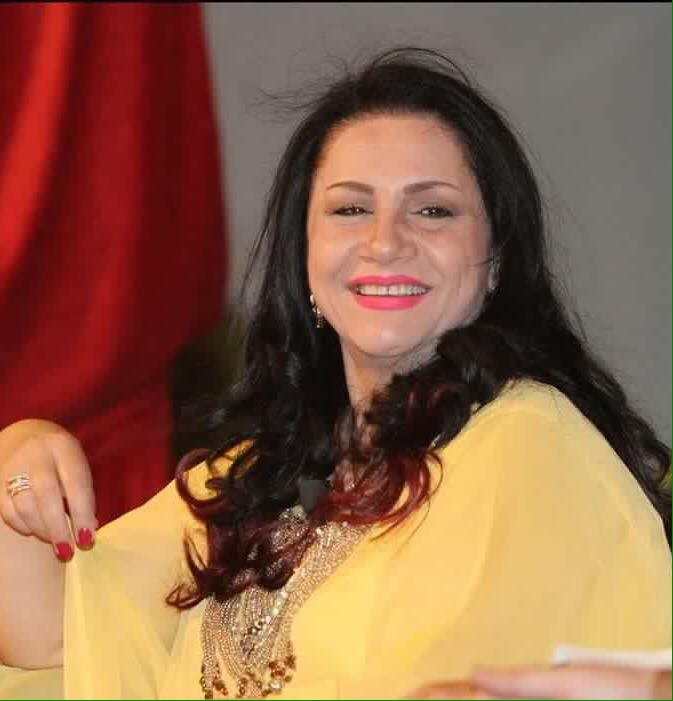
- Born: September 4, 1958 (age 67); Maysan, Iraq
- Occupation: Actor

Inam Al-Rubaie (Arabic: إنعام الربيعي; born September 4, 1958) is an Iraqi actress.

She began her artistic career at the Amarah Theatre in the 1970s. She became known for her comedic roles; although she performed in many other types of roles, she achieved success primarily in comedy. Despite the limited number of productions in Iraq, she established a strong artistic presence.

== Television works ==
- Al-Hajis (1984)
- Wolves of the Night (1990)
- Threads from the Past (1993)
- The Arena of Law (1996)
- Pride and Passion (1998)
- Love and War (2003)
- The Mud House (2005)
- The Flower Seller (2007)
- The Coming Fate (2007)
- Madi Ya Madi (2009)
- Bint al-Mu‘aydi (2012)
- The Madman and I (2014)
- Al-Sarkal (2017)
- Al-‘Ardhalji (2019)
- Baytawwati (2022)
- Confusion (2022)
- The Pasha's Son (2025)
