= Ali Dawai Lazem =

Governor Ali Dawai Lazem علي دواي لازم

Governor of Maysan Province
- Incumbent
- Assumed office 2010
- Preceded by: Mohammed Shia' Al Sudani

Personal details
- Born: 1965 (age 60–61) Amarah, Iraq
- Party: Sadrist Movement
- Profession: Politician

Ali Dawai Lazem (Arabic: علي دواي لازم) is the current Governor of Maysan Province. Dawai's popularity took off after images posted to Facebook showing him working in the streets and directing projects went viral. Dawai is the only Governor belonging to the Sadrist movement.
