= Majar al-Kabir =

Human settlement in Iraq

Coordinates: 31°35′N 47°10′E

Majar al-Kabir (Arabic: المجر الكبير) is a town in Maysan Governorate, southern Iraq, approximately 24 km from Amarah.

== History ==
In 2003, six British servicemen of the Royal Military Police were killed there during the Battle of Majar al-Kabir by the civilians of Iraq.

== Notable people ==
- Masoud El Amaratly lived in the town as a teenager, before he found fame as a folk singer.
