= Lourdes Pérez =

Puerto Rican musician

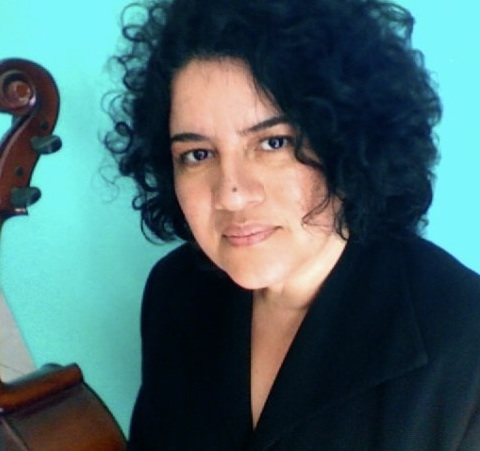

Background information
- Born: Bernardita de Lourdes Pérez Cruz; February 12, 1961 (age 65); San Sebastián, Puerto Rico
- Occupations: Singer, songwriter, composer, poet
- Instruments: Vocals, guitar
- Labels: Chee Wee Records, Vivavoce Records, Block Nota Records
- Website: http://www.lourdesperez.com

Lourdes Pérez (born Bernardita de Lourdes Pérez Cruz on February 12, 1961) is a Puerto Rican contemporary recording artist, songwriter, composer, arranger, poet, contralto vocalist, oral historian and guitarist. She is also one of few female decimistas (writer of décima, a specialized form of Spanish poetry). Often conjuring comparisons to the soulful world music genres of cante jonde, morna and fado, Pérez' body of music has been characterized as folk opera ("opera of the people") that honors her jíbara (Puerto Rican mountain) roots and the legacy of Spanish/pan-Latin American nueva trova or nueva cancion.

== Life and work ==
Pérez was born in Hato Arriba, San Sebastián, Puerto Rico. Considered by many to be "among the great Latin American female vocalists" and songwriters, Lourdes Pérez has performed duets with numerous legendary and diverse artists, from Argentine singer Mercedes Sosa and Mexican master decimista Guillermo Velázquez to Canadian pop artist Jane Siberry. Acclaimed for her "ability to transcend language...with her achingly beautiful contralto voice," she has devoted her work to promoting human rights around the globe. Pérez is one of 1000 performers in the world profiled in the MusicHound World: The Essential Album Guide (2000) and she is featured in the Oxford Encyclopedia of Latinos and Latinas in the United States (Oxford University Press, 2005).

Her discography includes 13 CDs, a full-length film score, a short film score, 2 modern dance scores, a theater score and numerous individual tributes, while her songs appear in films, CD compilations and anthologies. A concert at a Palestinian refugee camp prompted her Spanish translation of the Arabic song by Ahmad Kaabour/Tawfeeq Zayad, "Unadeekum (Te llamo)", which was later released on her CD, Este Filo. A song that Pérez wrote for the people of Sierra Blanca, Texas was read into the U.S. Congressional record by Rep. Lloyd Doggett (Texas) as part of a successful campaign against dumping nuclear waste inside a low-income Mexican American community on the Texas-Mexico border. References to her strong support for the independence of Puerto Rico can be found in several of her songs. In November 2006, her song, "Paloma Urbana" (Urban Dove) won Best Latin Song in the Just Plain Folks Music Awards. Over the years, she has been asked to write or improvise tributes to other artists, human rights leaders and elders, such as Chicana scholar Gloria Anzaldúa, Puerto Rican nationalist centenarian Isabel Rosado and disappeared Mayan resistance leader Efraín Bámaca Velásquez ("Comandante Everardo"). Pérez also provided contextual information on Puerto Rican poetry for U.S. Supreme Court Justice Sonia Sotomayor's memoir, My Beloved World (2013).

Lourdes Pérez was honored, alongside Ali Akbar Khan, as one of the country's "finest living artists" and was awarded a 2006 United States Artists unrestricted fellowship for her contribution to music.

The contemporary Puerto Rican trova group, Somos Tres, and the Lebanese singer, May Nasr, have recorded and interpreted Pérez's work.

Pérez is openly lesbian, and has written songs about lesbian experience. "Yo Pari Una Luchadora" (I Gave Birth to a Fighter) is a song dedicated to the mother of a lesbian human rights activist. Perez has lived and traveled with her partner and collaborator, Annette D'Armata, since 1991.

== Published work ==
- Tengo la Vida: Lourdes Pérez in concerto, live from Rome (Block Nota Records, 2018)
- Still Here: Homenaje al Westside de San Antonio, Oral history book and music CD, Lourdes Pérez composer, multiple artists (Chee Wee Records/Esperanza Press, 2018)
- Al Caer la Tarde, Lourdes Pérez and Eva Ybarra, 6 track EP (Chee Wee Records, 2016)
- Written in Water, Lourdes Pérez and May Nasr (duet CD in Spanish and Arabic) with special guest Ahmad Kaabour (Chee Wee Records, 2016)
- Dulce Vigilante: Remembranzas de la Región Oeste de Puerto Rico, Illustrated book and music CD, (Chee Wee House, 2015)
- 20 Años, Boxed collection of works from 1994 -2014, includes 8 CDs (Chee Wee Records, 2014)
- Te Llamo * Ounadikum, 3-track CD single recorded in Spanish and Arabic with May Nasr and special guest Ahmad Kaabour (Chee Wee Records 2011)
- En Vivo, Lourdes Perez con Miriam Perez, live duet concert with younger sister, Miriam Perez (Chee Wee, 2007)
- Este Filo, solo CD (Chee Wee, 2005)
- Azúl y Serena, commissioned work, recorded with the Dama de Noche Orchestra (Chee Wee, 2003)
- Pájaros de otro canto, commissioned soundtrack for the film, ¿Adónde Fue Juan José? (Chee Wee, 2003)
- Selections from Tres Oraciones (Chee Wee, 2002)
- Vestigios (Vivavoce Records, 1997)
- Recuerdate Por Mi (Chee Wee, 1994)

== Full-length scores ==
- Azul y Serena (multimedia tribute concert)
- Santuarios (modern/folkloric dance)
- conflama (word opera, theater)
- Adonde Fue Juan Jose (feature film)
- Marejada (multimedia, oral history)

== See also ==
- List of Puerto Ricans
