= Al-Mejar Al-Kabir District =

District in Iraq

Al-Mejar Al-Kabir District Arabic: قضاء المجر الكبير
- District
- Location within Iraq
- Coordinates: 31.4294°N 47.20355°E
- Country: Iraq
- Governorate: Maysan Governorate
- Seat: Majar al-Kabir

Population 2024
  - Total: 163,136
- Time zone: UTC+3 (AST)

Al-Mejar Al-Kabir District (Arabic: قضاء المجر الكبير) is a district of the Maysan Governorate, Iraq. Its seat is the town of Majar al-Kabir.
