= May Nasr =

May Nasr مي نصر
- Born: 1965 (age 60–61); Bahrain
- Origin: Lebanon
- Genres: Arabic music, Lebanese music
- Occupation: Singer
- Instrument: Vocals

May Nasr (Arabic: مي نصر; born 1965) is a Lebanese singer, musician and microfinancing consultant. She was born in the Kingdom of Bahrain in 1965 and she got a Bachelor of Arts from the university of Beirut in 1987.

== Biography ==
She appeared for the first time as a singer with the Lebanese composer Zaki Nassif and artist Farid Abu Alkher, and trained with them between 1997 and 2002. Then she worked with Badia Haddad between 2004 and 2009.

May Nasr sings classic songs from the Lebanese and Syrian heritage, especially songs of Lebanese singer Fairuz.

Nasr has participated in many Arabic concerts and festivals in Lebanon, Syria and Bahrain. She has also performed in concerts in the United States and Germany. She released her first album Expensive in Beirut and Damascus. Her second album was a collaborative effort with Puerto Rican musician Lourdes Pérez. She previously performed with Perez in the song "Te Llamo/Unadeekum" on Perez's 2005 album Este Filo. They also performed together in 2009 as part of Nasr's "Written in Water" tour, and in 2011 they reunited for a benefit concert for The Al Quds Association for Democracy and Dialogue.

Nasr is also a microfinancing consultant. She concentrates on funding for women in the Middle East.

== Discography ==
Albums

- Lil Ghaly (2008)
- Written in Water, Lourdes Pérez and May Nasr (Spanish and Arabic) with special guest Ahmad Kaabour (Chee Wee Records, 2016)
