= Masoud El Amaratly =

Iraqi folk singer (died 1944)

Masoud El Amaratly مسعود العمارتلي
- Recording of Masoud El Amaratly

Background information
- Born: 1897
- Died: 9 October 1944 (aged 46–47)
- Genres: Folk music
- Occupation: Singer
- Instrument: Voice
- Years active: 1925–1944
- Label: His Master's Voice

Masoud El Amaratly (Arabic: مسعود العمارتلي) was an Iraqi folk singer, who became famous for his poetry and folk music in the 1920s and 1930s. El Amaratly's first record was recorded in 1925 and his recordings became extremely popular across the Levant. He specialised in abuḏiya (ar), a form of Ahwari poetry, and rifi, rural folk music. El Amaratly's life as a mustarjil is cited as an example of past acceptance of LGBTQ+ people in Iraq.

== Life and career ==
Born in the marshlands of southern Iraq, to parents who were servants of a local chief, El Amaratly's year of birth is uncertain. Eli Erlick cites it as 1897, whereas Marwan Kaabour cites it as at "the turn of the 20th-century". Assigned female at birth, El Amaratly enjoyed singing from a young age and became known locally for his voice. It is not known when he began to live as a mustarjil: some accounts suggest it was from the age of 5 or 6, whereas others suggest his later teens. In his early teens, El Amaratly moved to Majar al-Kabir, after his employer threatened to marry him to her teenage son, which would have ended his nascent life as a mustarjil. In Majar al-Kabir he lived with his mother and his vocal talent was noticed by Sheikh Khazal bin Faleh al-Sayud and El Amaratly was taken into the Sheikh's protection.

Later, in 1916, having returned home, he was harassed by two men who heard him singing whilst working as a shepherd. El Amaratly defended himself, tied the men up and took them to his village, where he emphasised his mustarjil gender identity, and from that point was treated as a man by everyone. This suggests that from the age of approximately eighteen El Amaratly was living as a man.

El Amaratly became famous for his singing in the 1920s and 1930s in Baghdad. In 1925, whilst living in Al-Amara (the place from which he took the name El-Amaratly), he was scouted by an Iraqi music agent called Isa Ibn Huwaila, who took El Amaratly to Baghdad, where he signed a recording contract with His Master's Voice. This first recording was made in 1925 to a phonograph record. He was paid 32 rupees for his first four songs, and they proved such a success that he was recalled to make five further albums between 1926 and 1934, with his rate being raised to 150 rupees per song for some. He also sang in cafes and restaurants, where his folk repertoire was appreciated.

In 1936 he performed live on Radio Baghdad, reaching new audiences, and subsequently travelling and performing in Syria and Lebanon. He specialised in abuḏiya (ar), a form of Ahwari poetry, and rifi, rural folk music. Abuḏiya has been compared to the blues. The mournful nature of his music has been attributed by the journalist Amer Badr Hassoun, to the loss associated with his early life. Marwan Kaabour describes how El Amaratly's music is closely connected to the marshlands of his home. One song, for example, sings about how the reed bed upon which an Ahwari house stood was removed, and the singer's lover was transported away.

El Amaratly had married a maid called Ashnina at an unknown date. He later left Ashnina, and married a woman called Kamila. He died on 9 October 1944, and was reportedly poisoned by Kamila. However, two causes of his death have been cited: pulmonary tuberculosis or poisoning. The latter is suggested by Eli Erlick as the most plausible, based on sources from El Amaratly's family and friends, including his brother who accused Kamila of poisoning food at El Amaratly's final meal. She was apparently motivated by greed for money and possessions; Kamila was imprisoned for nine months as a result.

== Historiography ==
El Amaratly's life is cited as an example of how attitudes to LGBTQ+ people in Iraq have been more accepting in the past. Research has been undertaken by Professor Salman Khayoush into El Amaratly's life, and it is his opinion that further research into documents removed from Iraq by the British government may reveal more about El Amaratly's achievements. There are several images that purportedly portray El Amaratly, but none is a definite identification. Recordings of El Amaratly's music are held in the British Library and were digitised as part of a partnership with Qatar National Library. As of November 2024, director Ali Tufan was developing a film of El Amaratly's life, set against the backdrop of the 1920 Iraqi Revolt.

== Popular culture ==
- El Amaratly was portrayed by Saadoun Jaber in a 1996 television special. His music has also been featured on UTV, encouraged by Salman Kayoush, where it was described as "a world of sadness".
- The Lebanese author Rana Issa featured El Amaratly in a piece they wrote for inclusion in The Queer Arab Glossary, in which El Amaratly talked with drag queen Bassem Feghali.
- Marwan Kaabour in his account of El Amaratly's life, described the dichotomy between the extensive praise attributed to El Amaratly's singing in the biographical article on Arabic Wikipedia and the continued use of his deadname.
