= Marwan Kaabour =

Lebanese graphic designer, artist and editor (born 1987)

- Born: 1987 (age 38–39); Beirut, Lebanon
- Education: American University of Beirut; London College of Communication
- Occupations: Artist; graphic designer; editor
- Years active: 2012–present
- Father: Ahmad Kaabour
- Website: marwankaabour.com

Marwan Kaabour (born 1987) is a Lebanese graphic designer, artist and editor based in London.

== Early life ==
Kaabour was born in Beirut. He described his family as "loving and supportive", his mother a painter and his father a musician and actor Ahmad Kaabour. He graduated with a Bachelor of Fine Arts (BFA) in Graphic Design from the American University of Beirut in 2009. He subsequently relocated to London, spurred by a "childhood love of British pop culture" such as Spice Girls, where he pursued a Master of Arts (MA) at the London College of Communication.

== Career ==
After completing his MA, Kaabour joined the design firm Barnbrook Studios as an intern in 2012 before working his way up to designer and then senior designer. He designed Disobedient Objects, a companion book to the 2014 V&A museum exhibition of the same title, and the graphics for the Daydreaming with Stanley Kubrick exhibition at Somerset House in 2016. He headed the design of Rihanna's 2019 autobiography.

Upon leaving Barnbrook in 2019, Kaabour founded the online initiative Takweer, which started as a "research space for me to explore ideas and themes I was interested in. Little did I know that I was (accidentally) building an archive." Shortly after in 2020, he opened his own design studio with a focus on book design. Kaabour's typographs highlighting the Palestinian struggle began going viral on social media in 2021. He has written about the life of mustarjil folk singer Masoud El Amaratly.

Via Saqi Books, Kaabour edited and published his debut non-fiction book The Queer Arab Glossary in summer 2024. Categorising the Arabic slang into six dialects, the book features illustrations by Palestinian artist Haitham (Charles) Haddad and essays from eight writers, including Hamed Sinno, Rabih Alameddine and Abdellah Taïa. The book is a finalist for the 2025 Lambda Literary Award for LGBTQ+ Anthology.

== Personal life ==
Kaabour is gay.

== Bibliography ==
- The Queer Arab Glossary (2024)

== Filmography ==
Title	Year	Role	Notes	Ref.
Marco	2019	Marco/Ahmad		
