= Kamel Sajid =

Kamel Sajid al-Janabi
- كامل ساجت الجنابي
- Died: 2 March 1999
- Military career
- Allegiance: Ba'athist Iraq
- Branch: Iraqi Army
- Service years: ? – 1999
- Rank: Lieutenant General
- Unit: Republican Guard
- Conflicts: Iran-Iraq War: Battle of Khorramshahr; First Battle of al-Faw; Gulf War: Bombing of Iraq (1998)

Kamel Sajid al-Janabi (Arabic: كامل ساجت الجنابي) was a General of the Iraqi Republican Guard. He was detained by the Iraqi government on 16 December 1998, the same day that Operation Desert Fox began, and was executed on 2 March 1999 as part of a larger crackdown on a group of over 20 senior Iraqi officials accused of planning a coup against the government.

== Career ==
At the time of the First Battle of Al Faw Kamel was in command of the I Corps, having earlier commanded a division of the Republican Guard. Kamel was also Corps Commander for the 66th Special Forces Brigade.

Kamel was described by Ra'ad al-Hamdani during the Iraqi Perspectives Project as a courageous and honest person, but not a particularly competent commander, who often shrugged responsibility. Despite his shortcomings and repeated failures he escaped punishment due to Saddam's admiration for him due to his representation of the physical fitness of the Iraqi Special Forces.

He later became the governor for Muthanna Province, and also became deeply religious later in life, brought on in part by his intense feelings of guilt for his actions during the war.

== Family ==
Kamel had several brothers, two of whom fled Iraq, and later began issuing statements critical of the Ba'athist government, exposing abuses committed against prisoners in Iraq. Their mother was detained following their flight to try and pressure the brothers to return, and was released in order to secure their return. When the brothers failed to return to Iraq their mother was tortured to death. His son reportedly joined al-Qaeda during the Iraq War.
