= Mustarjil =

Arabic gender identity term and a slur

- Classification: Gender identity

Demographics
- Culture: Ahwari
Regions with significant populations
- Iraq

Mustarjil (Arabic: مسترجل), also in its feminised form mistarjila, is an Arabic-language term, as well as a gender identity used among the Ahwari culture, or Marsh Arabs, in Southern Iraq. The term equates with 'becoming a man' and is used for women who have adopted a masculine gender expression through choice or economic necessity. Lives of mustarjil people are recorded by British explorer Wilfred Thesiger who lived with the Ahwari in the 1950s; his observations were supplemented by the work of anthropologists Sigrid Westphal-Hellbush and Heinz Westphal. In 21st-century usage the term has misogynistic overtones.

== Etymology ==
The word "mustarjila" (مُستَرجِلة) is derived from the root R-J-L (ر-جُ-ل) in the Arabic language, which means man. The active participle from the verb istarjala is mustarjil (مُستَرجِل) for masculine, and mustarjila (مُستَرجِلة) for feminine. The term equates with 'becoming a man'. (Note: From the verb استرجل (with harakat: اِسْتَرْجَلَ, istarjala), with the meanings 'to become a man, to reach manhood, to grow up', or 'to act like a man, to man up' or 'to display masculine mannerisms, to resemble a man', for which مُسْتَرْجِل is the active participle.)

== Ahwari gender identity ==
British explorer Wilfred Thesiger recorded some aspects of the lives of mustarjil, as well as recording one person who was assigned male at birth, but lived and worked openly as a woman, during his time with the Ahwari people in the 1950s. In The Marsh Arabs, his account of life in Ahwari communities, Thesiger describes meeting a cisgender man who fought with a mustarjil, and was defeated. He also reflects that the nearest comparison he can make to them are "the Amazons of antiquity". Some mustarjil married, but did not undertake typically female work in the home. Again Thesiger recorded a conversation where his male companion stated that mustarjil married and had sex with women, in his words, "as we do". This was explained that although they were born into women's bodies they have "the heart of a man, so [live] as a man". Those who assumed the gender identity had the same rights as men, both socially and militarily. Those who fought were rewarded for their service in the same manner as cisgender men.

Anthropologists Sigrid Westphal-Hellbush and Heinz Westphal made similar observations to Thesiger about the lives of mustarjil. They observed that young women made the decision to live as mustarjil soon after puberty; however, in terms of inheritance, mustarjil were still viewed as women. If they wanted to have children, they had to dismiss their transmasculine appearance and could not return to it in future. The association of mustarjil with Ahwari culture is also described by writer Marwan Kaabour, who also compared mustarjil to the hijra and mukhannath third genders. Author Eli Erlick has described how mustarjil lived lives parallel to that of trans men in the twenty-first century.

Recording of Massoud El Amaratly

Folk singer Masoud El Amaratly was a famous singer in Iraq and neighbouring countries from c.1925 to his death in 1944, and was also mustarjil.

== 21st-century usage ==
The term has been used in many contexts within popular culture, religious texts, and other descriptions applied to women who resemble men. Regardless of the reasons for this difference in women's appearance, the label has been applied to anyone society perceived as possessing masculine traits. This description was often used for purposes such as mockery, criticism, or as a way for society to deter women from such differences.

In Islamic tradition, the "mustarjila" (masculinized woman) is condemned; according to prophetic hadiths, she is cursed and thereby excluded from God's mercy, as she is seen to have attempted to alter God's creation. Moreover, it is said that God will not look upon her on the Day of Judgment, as a form of rebuke and deterrence. Cutting one's hair in a way that resembles men's hairstyles is also considered forbidden under Islamic law. According to an article in the Jordanian newspaper Ad-Dustour, Arab society in general, and Muslim society in particular, views the term "mustarjila" as an insult directed at women. The article goes on to say that any masculinisation of Arab women is due to Western influence.

Mistarjila is used as a term for queer women in the Levant, but has misogynistic overtones according to The Queer Arab Glossary. The glossary describes the term as: "'mannish'; tomboy; suggesting she may be lesbian; in the past the term zanmardeh was also used (woman-man in Persian)".

== Notable people ==
- Masoud El Amaratly, folk singer
