= Ali Al-Gharbi District =

Ali Al-Gharbi District قضاء علي الغربي
- District
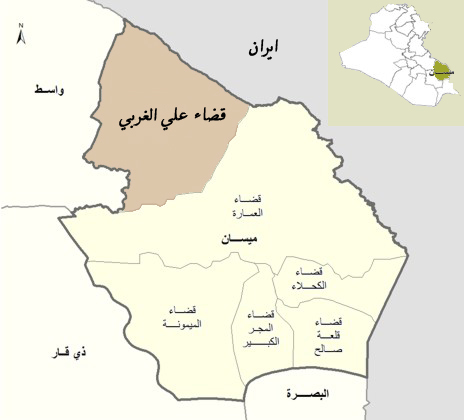
- Ali Al-Gharbi in Iraq

- Location within Iraq
- Coordinates: 32.46186°N 46.68794°E
- Country: Iraq
- Governorate: Maysan Governorate
- Time zone: UTC+3 (AST)

Ali Al-Gharbi (Arabic: قضاء علي الغربي) is a district of the Maysan Governorate in Iraq.

== History ==
John Gordon Lorimer wrote in 1908 that the main town of Ali Al-Gharbi was inhabited by 2,000 people of different origins, mostly Shia Muslims and was a market town of the Banu Lam Arab tribe. It was one of the principal towns for trade with Iraqi Kurdistan and many Kurds from Iran would visit the town to 'satisfy their wants'. Lorimer moreover wrote that many Kurds had settled in the town.

Scholar Kamandâr stated that the main town was 90% Kurdish from the Kordali tribe prior to the Arabization policies of Ba'athist Iraq.
