= Ahmad Kaabour =

Lebanese singer and composer (1955–2026)

Ahmad Kaabour أحمد قعبور
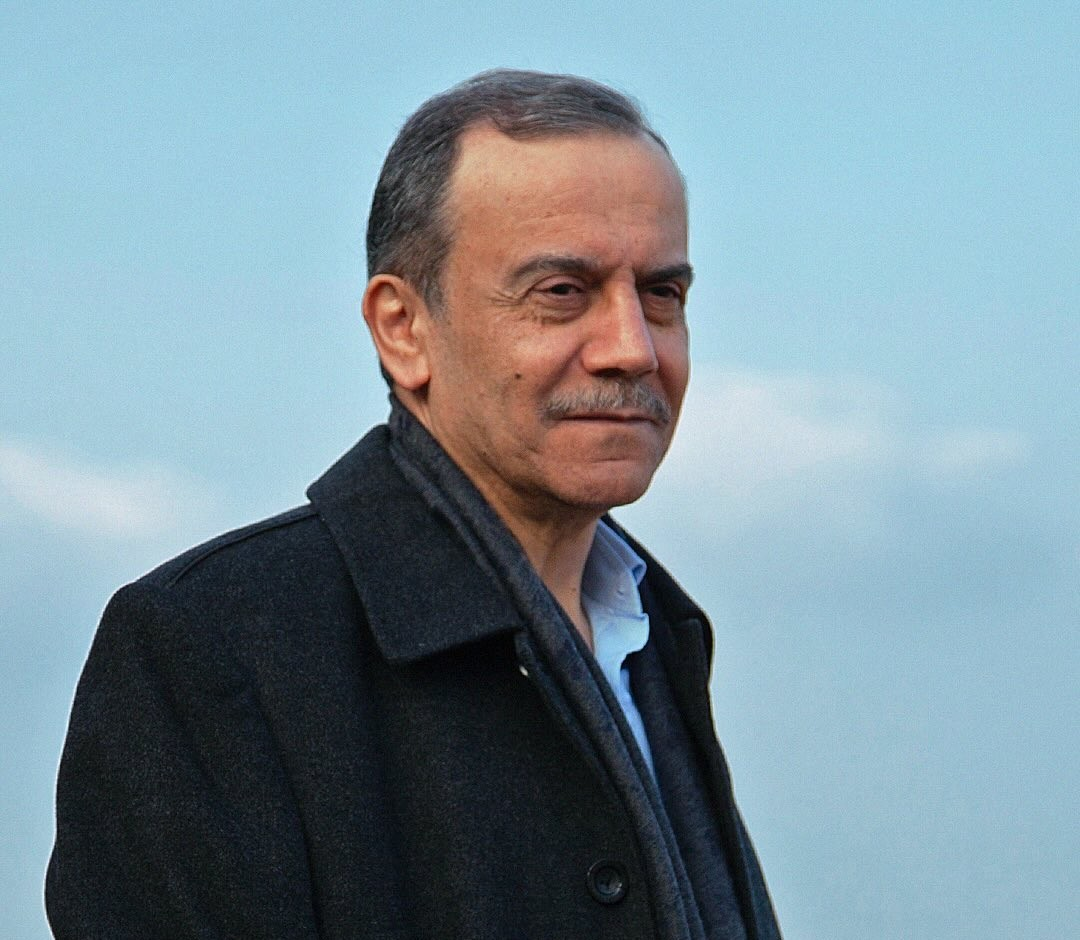
- Kaabour in 2014

Background information
- Born: 9 July 1955; Beirut, Lebanon
- Died: 26 March 2026 (aged 70) Beirut, Lebanon
- Genre: Arabic
- Occupations: Singer; songwriter; actor
- Instruments: Guitar; oud
- Years active: 1976–2026

Ahmad Kaabour (Arabic: أحمد قعبور, romanized: Aḥmad Qaʿbūr; 9 July 1955 – 26 March 2026) was a Lebanese singer, songwriter, composer and actor. He is best known for his song "Ounadikom" which he composed in 1975 upon the outbreak of the Lebanese Civil War.

== Background ==
Kaabour was born on 9 July 1955 in Beirut, Lebanon, to Mahmoud Kaabour (aka Al-Rasheedi), a prominent violinist, and Fatima Al-Ghoul. He and his siblings grew up in the Basta area of Beirut before moving to Al-Horsh neighbourhood. His father's work cultivated his musical background alongside other influences. He studied theatre at the Lebanese University in Beirut.

== Career ==
=== Singer ===
Kaabour was best known for his song "Ounadikom" (أناديكم, "I Call Out to You"), the first track of his album Ounadikom based on a poem written by Palestinian poet Tawfiq Ziad. He composed the song at the age of 19 in 1975 with the outbreak of the Lebanese Civil War, and released it in 1976. The song, which has been described as a "tribute to resistance against Israel", became a classic protest song over the following years.

Early on in his career, he produced a body of work dedicated to Palestine and its people, which evolved to encompass issues concerning his home country Lebanon and its struggles. His music portrays his belief in the power of music in shedding light on humanitarian causes, and its ability to make a difference. He released six studio albums, and continued to produce music for children's theater, television, film and other media. He collaborated with other prominent Lebanese artists, such as Ziad Rahbani and Marcel Khalife.

=== Actor ===
Kaabour started his career as an actor by taking roles in several plays during the 1970s and 1980s, as in Shi Feshil (lit. Failure) with Ziad Rahbani in 1983. Later on he appeared in the biographical film of Naji al-Ali alongside Nour El-Sherif in 1991. He made his international film debut playing the featured role of Wadie Haddad in the historical epic Carlos, which premiered at the 2010 Cannes Film Festival. He also worked with Rabih Mroué, among others.

== Personal life and death ==
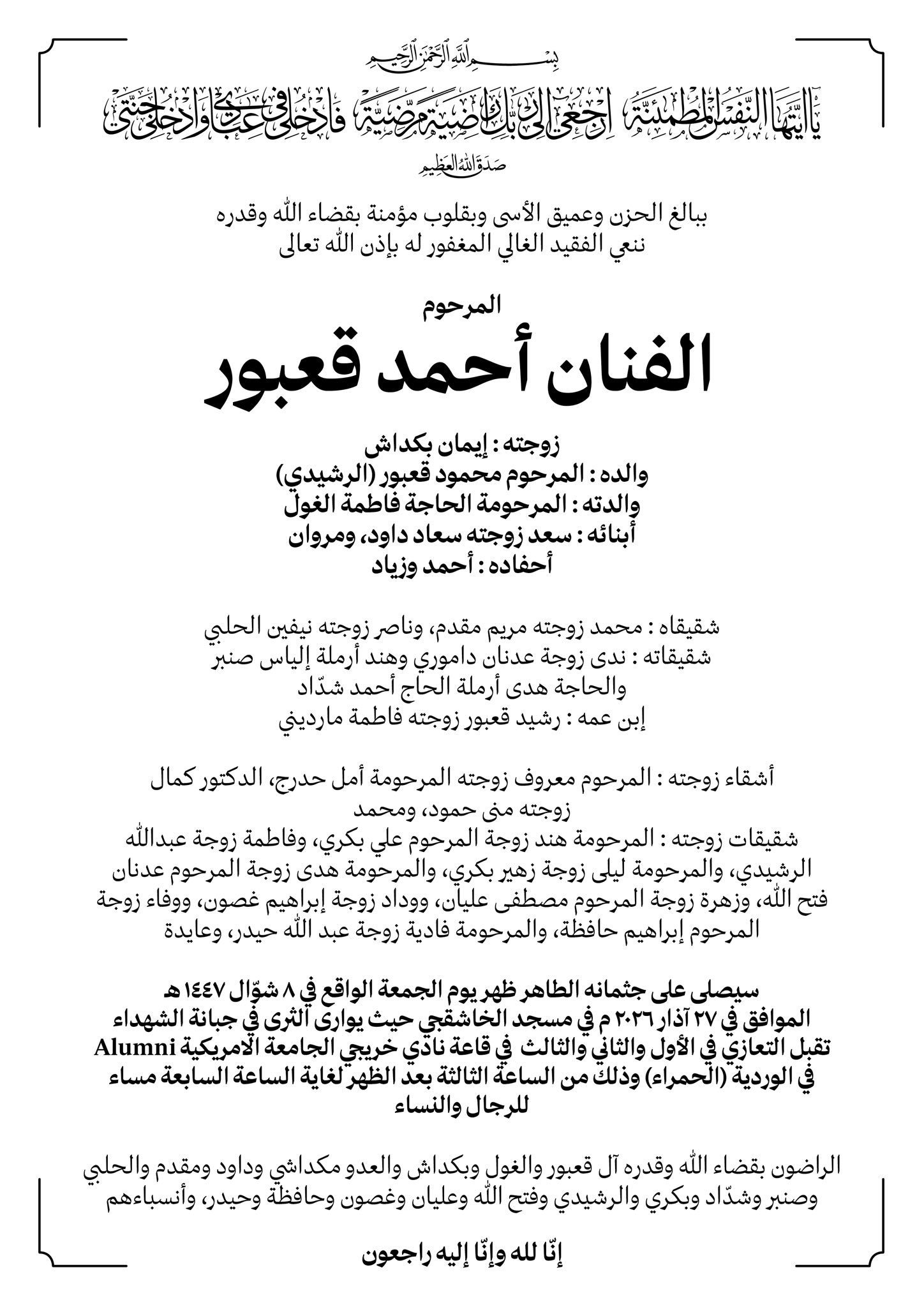
Kaabour's obituary

Kaabour was the father of Lebanese artist and editor Marwan Kaabour.

Ahmad Kaabour died at Al-Makassed Hospital in Beirut, on 26 March 2026, following a long illness. He was 70. He was buried at the Martyrs' Cemetery in the city.

== Discography ==
- Ounadikom (أناديكم, 1976)
- Hob (حب, 1982)
- Nehna El Nas (نحنا الناس)
- Ounadikom (1996 re-release)
- Sawton A'ali (صوتن عالي, 2002)
- Ounadikom (2004 re-release)
- Baddi Ghanni Lannas (بدّي غنّي للناس, 2010)
- Ramadaniyat Ahmad Kaabour (رمضانيات أحمد قعبور, 2011)
- Ahmad Kaabour Yoghanni Omar El Z'inni (أحمد قعبور يغني عمر الزعني, 2011)
- Lamma Tghibi (لمّا تغيبي, 2019)
