= Amarah =

Amarah ٱلْعَمَارَة
- City
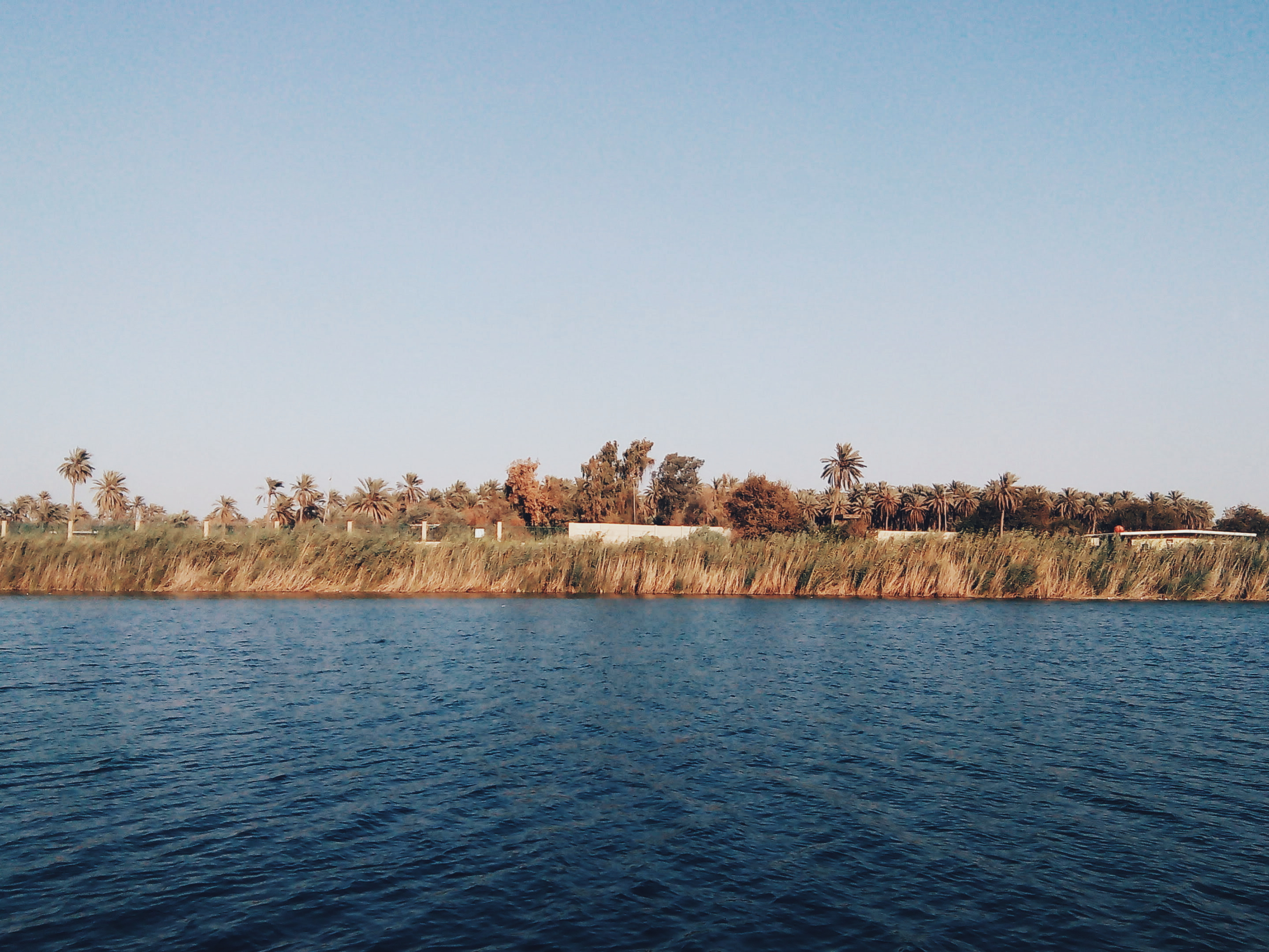
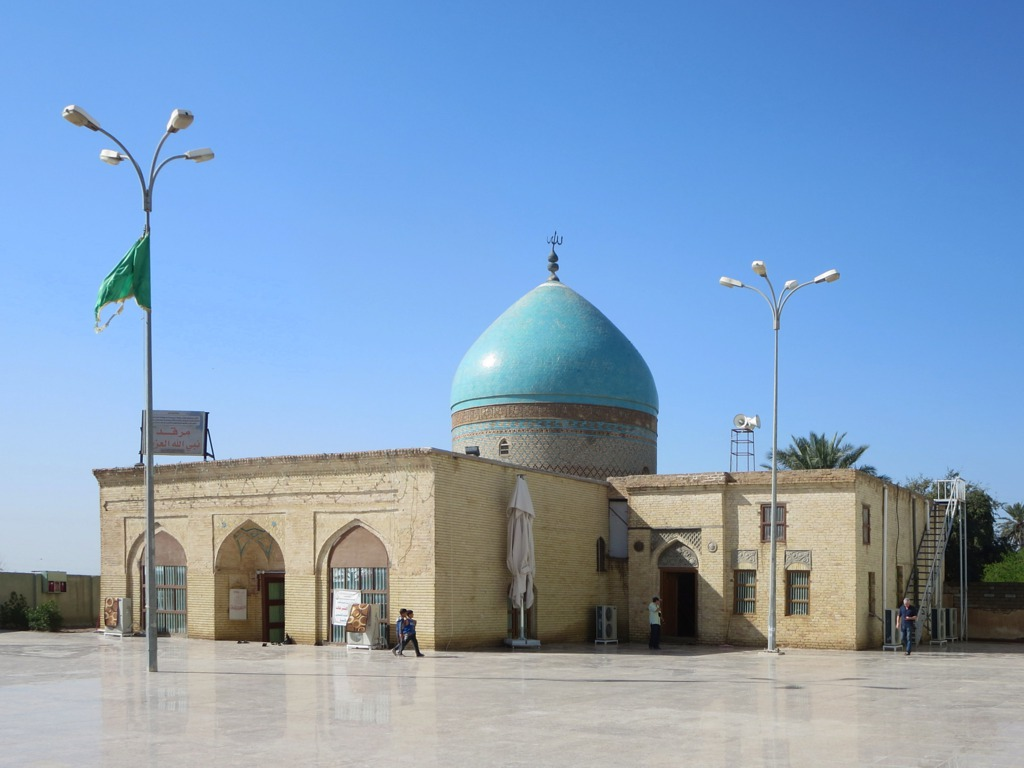
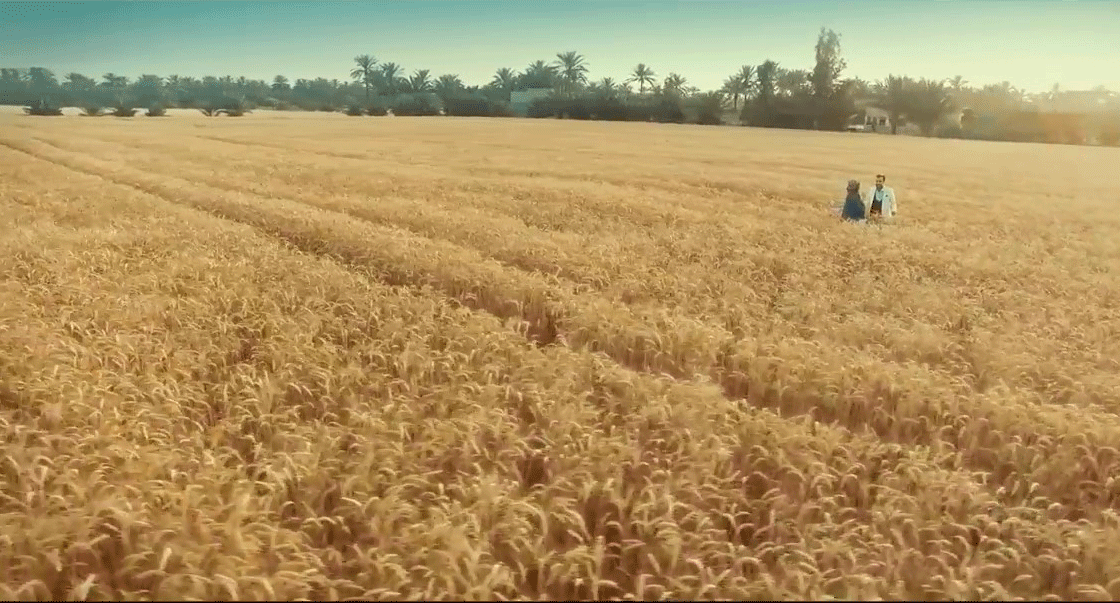
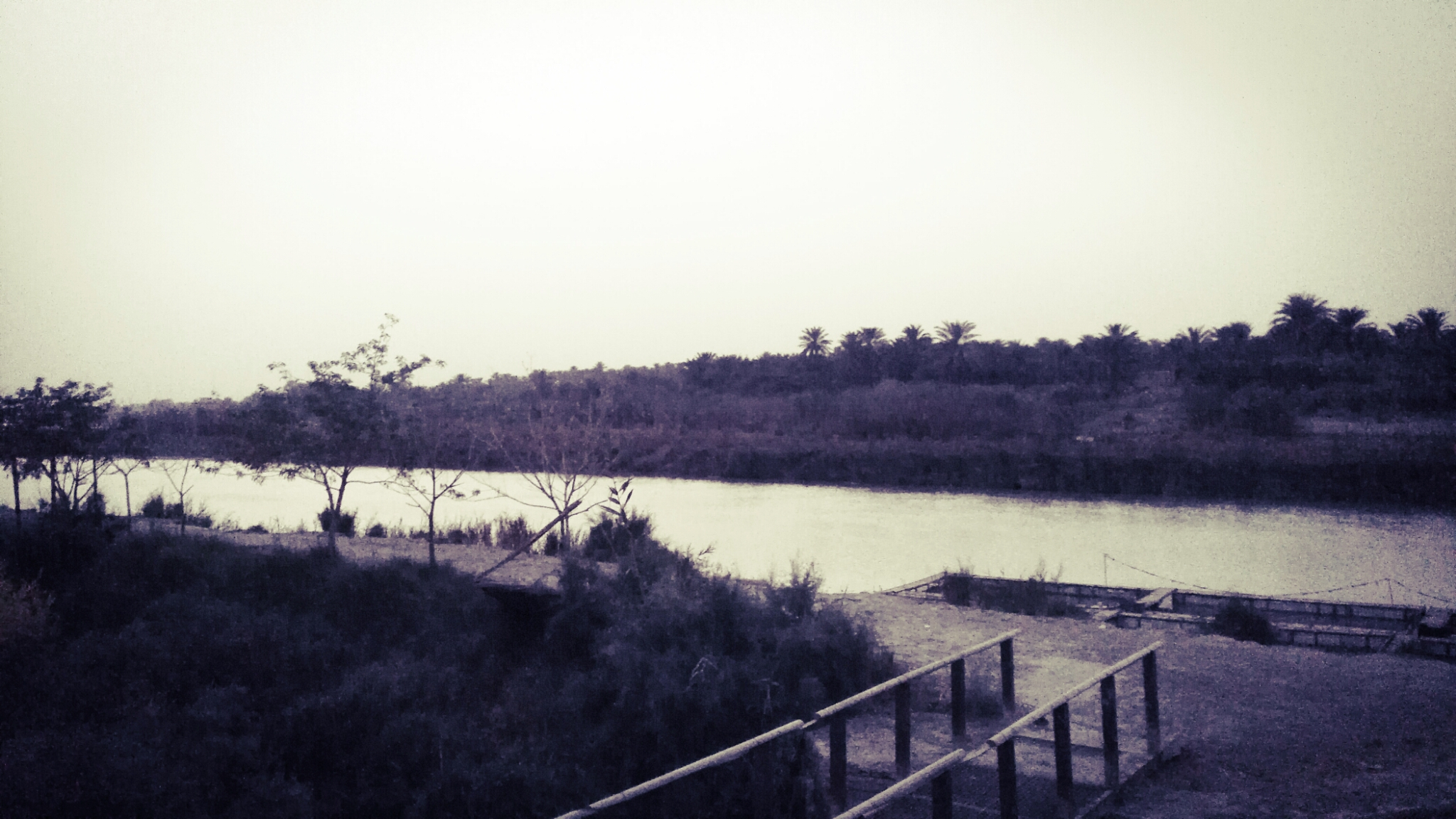
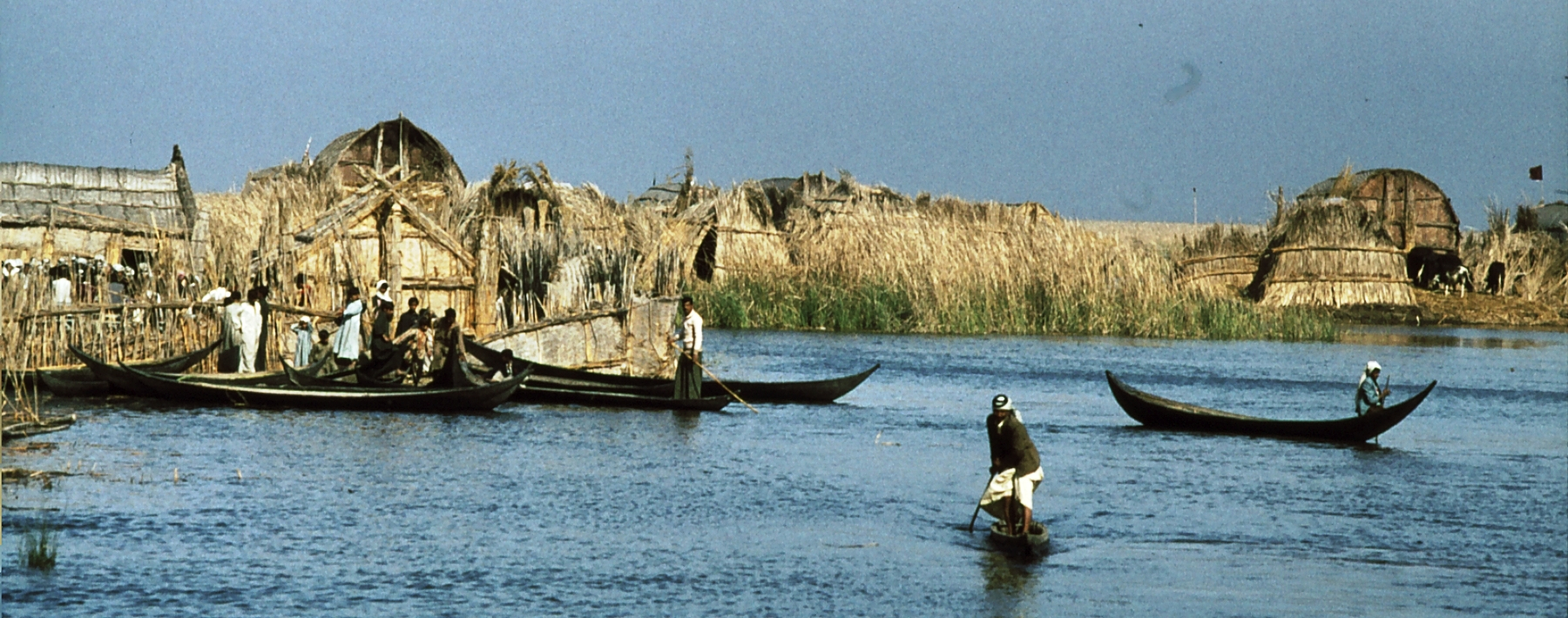
- Photographs of Amarah, including views of the Tigris

- Location Iraq
- Coordinates: 32°0′N 47°0′E
- Country: Iraq
- Governorate: Maysan
- Founded: 1860

Area
  - Total: 2,963 km^{2} (1,144 sq mi)
- Elevation: 12 m (39 ft)

Population (2024 census)
  - Total: 719,898
  - Density: 243.0/km^{2} (629.3/sq mi)

Amarah (Arabic: ٱلْعَمَارَة, romanized: al-ʿAmārah), also spelled Amara, is a city in south-eastern Iraq, located on a low ridge next to the Tigris River waterway south of Baghdad about 50 km (31 mi) from the border with Iran. It lies at the northern tip of the marshlands between the Tigris and Euphrates.

It had a population of about 340,000 in 2002 and 720,000 in 2024. Amarah is the seat of the Maysan Province. A major trading center for the surrounding agricultural area, the city is known for woven goods and silverware. The staple economic goods produced in northern Amarah are winter cereals such as wheat and barley, as well as animals such as sheep and horses.

== History ==
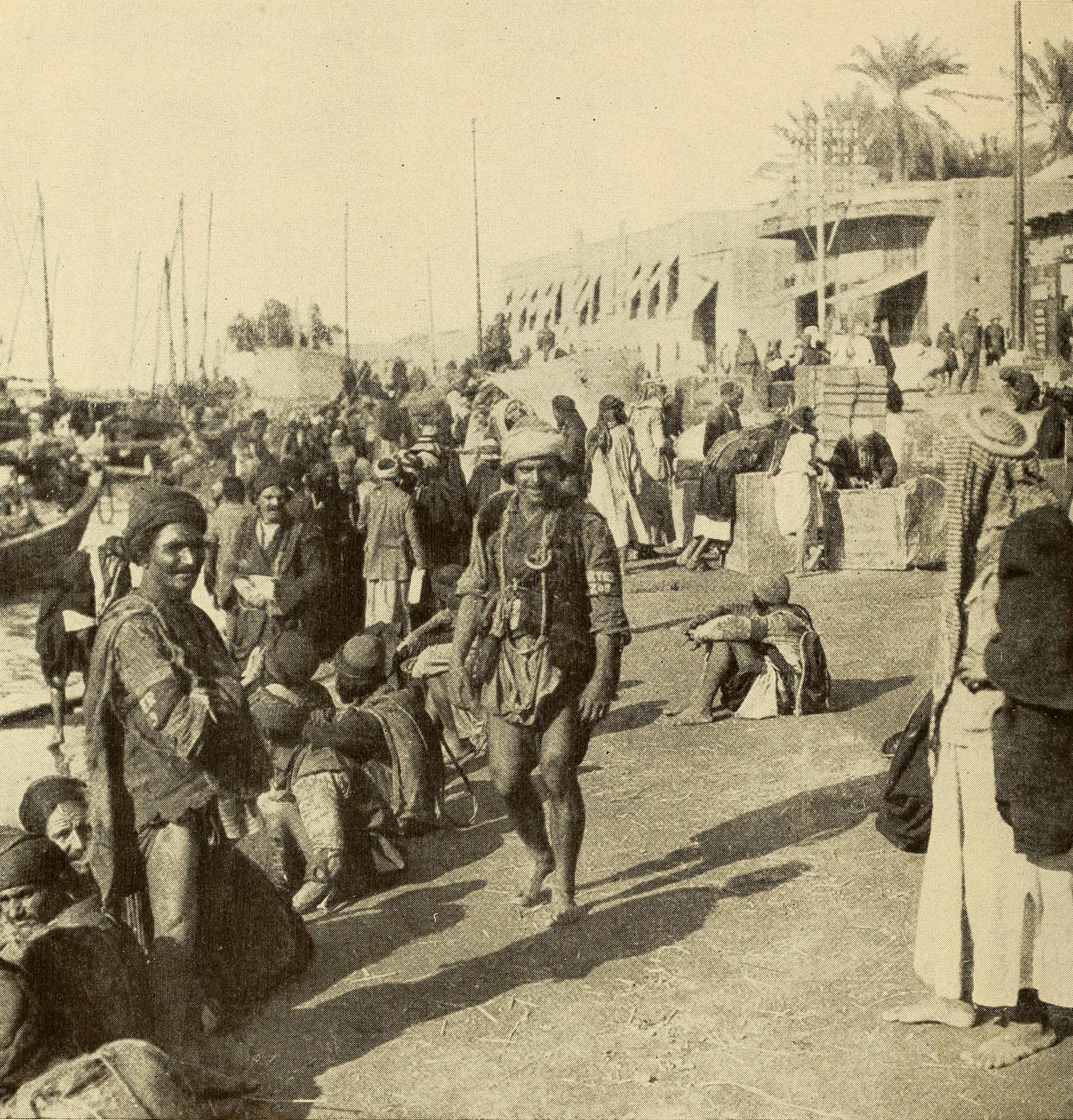
Kurdish coolies along the banks of the Tigris in Amarah, ca. 1919

The city was founded in the 1860s as an Ottoman military outpost from which the empire tried to control the warring Banu Lam and Al Bu Muhammad tribes.

In 1915 Amarah was captured by the British. Before the revolution in 1958 Amarah was known for its feudal system with local estate-holders maintaining private militias.

Abdul Rahim al-Rahmani founded the first bookstore in Amarah in 1922, and the city's first cinema in 1950.

During the eight-year Iran–Iraq War, the eastern parts of the province became the site of several battles, notably Operation Before the Dawn launched by Iran. Since the Baghdad-Basra highway cut through the province, Iran targeted the area due to its strategic significance to the Iraqis.

After the Persian Gulf War, Amarah was one of many sites during the 1991 uprisings in Iraq against Saddam Hussein. Many insurgents throughout Iraq retreated to safe havens in the Amarah area. Many were killed and crudely buried in a mass grave outside the city. Saddam Hussein also resorted to a crude tactic of draining the marshes surrounding Amarah. Furthermore, Saddam constructed a number of dams in an effort to cut off the water supply to the area.

Throughout the 90's, the town's population swelled with refugees from the marshes. Saddam Hussein occasionally neglected service to the city in retribution for its role in the uprising. The city also supported the efforts of Moqtada al-Sadr, whose father was also killed by Saddam. In May 1999, Ba'ath party militias and units of the Special Republican Guard conducted operations in the region. Local resistance forces reportedly repelled the operation.

=== Iraq War (2003–2011) ===
During the 2003 invasion of Iraq, the city made a final stand as a center of resistance to Saddam Hussein. The city was soon occupied by British forces, which set up two camps. Local residents hired diggers to unearth the bodies in the mass grave after twelve years. However, in June 2003, citizens of Amarah took up arms against patrolling British forces, killing six soldiers each in two separate attacks, south of the City in Majar al-Kabir. The British bases frequently experienced mortar attacks afterward.

Battle of Amarah: After the British handed power over to the Iraqi government, a power struggle erupted between Shi'ite loyalists of the Mahdi Army and Badr Brigades. A number of assassinations occurred in the city between the rival factions. According to Sheik Abdul Kareem al-Muhamadawi, the latest dispute between the Shiite militias began after Qassim al-Tamimi, the chief of investigations for the provincial police force and a member of the Badr Organization, was killed in a bombing. Badr fighters blamed the Mahdi Army for the killing. After the brother of Sheikh Fadel al-Bahadli, the Mahdi Army commander in the province, was captured, the Mahdi Army captured least three police stations and other state facilities on October 20, 2006, resulting in at least 22 deaths, three of which were children.

On June 18, 2008, the Iraqi Army launched a major operation in Amarah to wrest the city from the control of militias loyal to Muqtada al-Sadr and to reduce the flow of weapons and Shiite militants transiting through the city from nearby Iran. The operation, codenamed Promise of Peace (Bashir Al Salem in Arabic), followed significant Iraqi Army operations in Basra, the Sadr City neighborhood of Baghdad, and Mosul in the first half of 2008.

During this time, the 4th Brigade of the US Army's 1st Cavalry Division established a semi-permanent presence in the province by constructing two large operating bases in the Province and several smaller company outposts. Specific within 4th Brigade, Amarah and its surrounding towns were covered by 2nd Battalion of the 7th Cavalry Regiment, which established FOB Garryowen just west of the city proper. Throughout 2008 and 2009, over 2,000 US troops from the 1st Cavalry Division partnered with the Iraqi Army, police, and the Border Enforcement Brigade in the Province to defeat Shia extremism and interdict illicit arms smuggling across the Iranian border. Working closely with British investigators and Iraqi police, US troops also successfully detained 11 out of 17 individuals who were wanted for the murder of British soldiers in Majr Al Khabir back in 2003. All 11 suspects faced murder charges in a Baghdad court.

Provincial elections in January 2009 saw a dramatic shift in the balance of power in Amarah and Maysan Province in general. In an election widely recognized as both credible and legitimate, Maysan voters broke the six-year-long grip that Sadrist parties had on power in the Provincial Council resulting in an even split between Sadrist and Islamic Dawa Party affiliates in the council. In May 2009, the PC formally appointed a Dawa Party member to the governorship to replace the radical Sadrist leadership that had held power for years in the Province.

== Notable people ==
- Masoud El Amaratly, mustarjil folk singer, lived in the city when he was scouted in 1925.
- Lihadh Al-Gazali, professor of clinical genetics, was born in Amarah in 1950.

== Climate ==
Amarah experiences a hot desert climate (Köppen climate classification BWh) with extremely hot and dry summers and cool, wetter winters. On July 31, 2020, a temperature of 53.0 °C (127.4 °F) was recorded.

Climate data for Amarah (1991-2020, extremes 2010-present)
Month	Jan	Feb	Mar	Apr	May	Jun	Jul	Aug	Sep	Oct	Nov	Dec	Year
Record high °C (°F)	25.5 (77.9)	30.2 (86.4)	41.0 (105.8)	43.1 (109.6)	47.8 (118.0)	52.0 (125.6)	53.0 (127.4)	51.8 (125.2)	49.4 (120.9)	45.2 (113.4)	35.4 (95.7)	28.4 (83.1)	53.0 (127.4)
Mean daily maximum °C (°F)	17.4 (63.3)	20.5 (68.9)	25.8 (78.4)	32.0 (89.6)	39.2 (102.6)	44.4 (111.9)	46.3 (115.3)	46.4 (115.5)	42.7 (108.9)	35.7 (96.3)	25.4 (77.7)	19.9 (67.8)	33.0 (91.3)
Daily mean °C (°F)	11.8 (53.2)	14.3 (57.7)	—	25.2 (77.4)	32.1 (89.8)	36.7 (98.1)	38.4 (101.1)	37.9 (100.2)	33.9 (93.0)	27.4 (81.3)	18.7 (65.7)	13.4 (56.1)	26.2 (79.2)
Mean daily minimum °C (°F)	7.0 (44.6)	9.1 (48.4)	13.0 (55.4)	18.5 (65.3)	24.6 (76.3)	28.2 (82.8)	30.0 (86.0)	29.2 (84.6)	25.3 (77.5)	19.9 (67.8)	13.1 (55.6)	8.7 (47.7)	18.9 (66.0)
Record low °C (°F)	−1.0 (30.2)	−2.5 (27.5)	−2.7 (27.1)	5.5 (41.9)	16.1 (61.0)	23.2 (73.8)	23.5 (74.3)	24.4 (75.9)	16.5 (61.7)	10.8 (51.4)	3.8 (38.8)	0.0 (32.0)	−2.7 (27.1)
Average precipitation mm (inches)	31.4 (1.24)	19.3 (0.76)	34.6 (1.36)	18.2 (0.72)	8.4 (0.33)	0.1 (0.00)	0.0 (0.0)	0.0 (0.0)	0.9 (0.04)	9.2 (0.36)	35.1 (1.38)	33.2 (1.31)	190.4 (7.5)
Average precipitation days	8	6	7	6	4	0	0	0	0	3	5	6	45
Average relative humidity (%)	71.2	62.9	53.9	45.6	34.5	24.9	22.9	24.5	28.6	40.1	58.3	69.8	44.8
Source 1: World Meteorological Organisation (precipitation days 1976-2008)
Source 2: Meteomanz(extremes)

== See also ==
- Operation Before the Dawn
- Battle of Amarah
- Battle of Majar al-Kabir

== Bibliography ==
- Inside The Resistance: The Iraqi Insurgency and the Future of the Middle East, Zaki Chehab, Nation Books, 2005
