= Maysan Governorate =

Governorate of Iraq

Maysan Governorate Arabic: محافظة ميسان
- Governorate
- Seal

- Coordinates: 31°54′N 47°2′E
- Country: Iraq
- Capital: Amarah

Government
  - Governor: Habib al-Fartousi

Area
  - Total: 16,072 km^{2} (6,205 sq mi)

Population (2024 census)
  - Total: 1,293,636
  - Density: 80.490/km^{2} (208.47/sq mi)
- HDI (2024): 0.676 medium · 16th of 18
- Website: maysan.gov.iq

Maysan Governorate (Arabic: ميسان, romanized: Maysān or Mīsān) is a governorate in southeastern Iraq, bordering Iran. Its administrative centre is the city of Amarah, and it is composed of six districts. Before 1976, it was named Amara Province.

== Etymology ==
This region was called Messène (Μεσσήνη) by Ancient Greeks (Strabo), Mīšān (ܡܝܫܢ) in Syriac. Mēs̲h̲ān in Middle Persian and Parthian (𐭌𐭉𐭔𐭍 myšn), Mēs̲h̲un in Armenian, Maysān or Mīsān (ميسان) in Arabic, and T’iao-tche (Chaldaea) in the Han sources.

== History ==
Alexander the Great founded the town of Charax Spasinu in 324 B.C. in the governorate. The town later became the capital of the Characene kingdom. It now exists as the ruins of Naysan.

The area suffered greatly during the Iran–Iraq War, during which it was a major battlefield, and again during the 1991 Iraqi uprisings led by the Shia population.

== Government ==
=== Ba'athist era ===
From 1992 to 1994, Saddam Hussein appointed a senior military commander named Kamel Sajid, who had served during the Iran–Iraq War and led special forces missions into Kuwait, during the Gulf War, to become the governor, following a decision to replace all provincial governors with military ones. Under Janabi's administration he reportedly introduced stronger Islamic policies, which coincided with Saddam's faith campaign at the time.

Saddam Hussein's brother-in-law who visited the province commented on Janabi's administration, saying he had built a "mini Islamic state". Janabi ordered the closure of all bars serving alcohol, and built several mosques across the province. He would also collect money for donations to the sick and poor, as well as visit hospitals. Janabi also reprimanded a police officer for allowing his car to cut through traffic, after the officer noticed it was the governor's car. Locals reportedly referred to him as "Abu Omar" in reference to Umayyad Caliph Umar II, viewing Janabi's rule as similar. He also reportedly spared the life of a Shia man who was cooperating with Iran in the province and had turned himself in to Iraqi security forces.

In 1994, Janabi was relieved from his position and sent to work for Saddam in Baghdad instead. Many Ba'athist officials criticized both Saddam and Janabi for their religiousness, and told Saddam that Janabi was a fifth-column element in the regime. However, Saddam dismissed these claims in his favor, and Janabi himself was reportedly loyal to Saddam.

=== Post-2003 ===
The current governor is Ali Dawai Lazem, a supporter of Muqtada al-Sadr. As of 2013, he is the only provincial governor in Iraq belonging to the Sadrist Movement. Though he is a Shi'a, he is a non-sectarian and has said "It doesn't make a difference if you are Sunni or Shi'ite or Christian. I don't differentiate between anyone." He has been called Iraq's most popular politician.

In 2013, The New York Times praised Dawai's governance, stating that "roads are being paved, new sewage systems installed and residents now enjoy electricity for up to 22 hours a day, far more than in Baghdad."

=== List of governors ===
Picture	Governor	Assumed role	Party
	Kamel Sajit Aziz al-Janabi	1992-1994	Iraqi Baath Party
	Riyadh Mahood al-Muhammadawi	2003	Independent
	Adil Mahwadar Radi	2005	Sadrist Movement
	Mohammed Shia' Al Sudani	2009	State of Law Coalition
	Ali Dawai Lazem	2010	Sadrist Movement

== Demographics ==
The vast majority of the population of Maysan is Shia Arabs. There exists a small minority of Shia Feyli Kurds that inhabit the northeastern part of the province, specifically Ali Al-Gharbi District, as well as a small population of Mandeaens and Christians. It is covered in the south by many Mesopotamian Marshes, and has traditionally been home to many Marsh Arabs.

In 2007, the unemployment rate was 17%.

Historical population
Year	Pop.	±% p.a.
1977	372,600	—
1987	487,448	+2.72%
1997	637,126	+2.71%
2009	922,890	+3.14%
2024	1,293,636	+2.28%
Source: Citypopulation

== Districts ==
- Amara (العمارة)
- Ali Al-Gharbi (علي الغربي)
- Al-Kahla (الكحلاء)
- Al-Maimouna (الميمونة)
- Al-Mejar Al-Kabi (المجر الكبير)
- Qal'at Saleh (قلعة صالح)
