= Keikavus (Ziyarid) =

Ziyarid emir from 1050 to 1087

- Emir of the Ziyarid dynasty

Emir of Tabaristan
- Reign: c. 1050 – 1087
- Predecessor: Manuchihr
- Successor: Gilanshah
- Born: 1021
- Died: 1087 (aged 66)
- Issue: Gilanshah
- Dynasty: Ziyarid
- Father: Iskandar
- Mother: Ghaznavid princess
- Religion: Sunni Islam

Keikavus (Persian: كيكاوس) was the ruler of the Ziyarid dynasty from c. 1050 to 1087. He was the son of Iskandar and grandson of Qabus. During his reign, he had little power, due to his status as a vassal to the Seljuqs. He is the celebrated author of the Qabus nama, a major work of Persian literature.

== Biography ==
Keikavus was born in 1021, during the reign of his uncle Manuchihr. In 1041/1042, the Seljuq Sultan Tughril conquered Tabaristan. He then appointed a Seljuq noble to govern the region, but let Anushirvan Sharaf al-Ma'ali keep his status as nominal ruler of those territories. During this period, Keikavus spent his time traveling around the Middle East; he stayed for eight years at Ghazni and even married a daughter of the Ghaznavid Sultan Mahmud, who later bore him Gilanshah. Keikavus then made a pilgrimage to Mecca, where he afterwards traveled to the court of the Shaddadid emir Abu'l-Aswar Shavur at Ganja in Arran, and aided him in his invasion of Ani. In 1050, Anushirvan died, and was succeeded by Keikavus as the ruler of Tabaristan. Keikavus' long and peaceful reign certainly encouraged his domains to more cultural activities. Keikavus later died in 1087, and was succeeded by his son.

== Qabus nama ==
Keikavus was not only a ruler, but also a poet; in 1082, he wrote the Qabus nama, which he named after his grandfather Qabus. The book was written in Persian, the native language of Keikavus. The book contains forty-four chapters.

In the book, Keikavus recalls his noble origins. He tells about the genealogy of his father, saying that he was a descendant of Arghush Farhadan, the king of Gilan, who lived during the time of Kai Khosrow.

Keikavus states in the book, that the grandmother of his father, was descended from Sasanian king Khosrau I. He also states that his mother was a Ghaznavid princess, and that his great-grandmother of his father's side was the daughter of Hasan ibn al-Fairuzan, a noble of Tabaristan and a relative of Makan ibn Kaki.

The first four chapters of the book tells about the creation of the world, and God's is religious duties. The fifth chapter is about duties towards parents. The next two deal with the cultivation of the mind and the power of speech. The next chapters talks about youth and old age; moderation in food; consumption of wine; chess and backgammon; love; the pleasures of life; having a hot bath; sleep and rest; hunting; polo; war; accumulation of wealth; trust in words; the purchase of slaves; the purchase of properties; the purchase of horses; marriage; children's education; the choice of friends; how to deal with enemies; forgiveness; punishment and favors; studies and legal functions; commercial law; medicine; astrology and mathematics; poetry; the art of minstrelsy; the service of kings; the qualities of a courtier, secretaries, viziers, generals and king; farming and agriculture; and finally about generosity.

In the book, Keikavus also says the following about his grandfather:

It is told of my grandfather Qabus that he was a bloodthirsty man, never able to forgive an offence. He was a cruel man, and because of his cruelty his troops determined upon seeking vengeance. They accordingly entered into a conspiracy with my uncle, Manuchihr, who came and seized his father, Qabus, being compelled to that action by the army, which threatened to transfer the kingdom to a stranger if he did not agree to their terms. Realising that the sovereignty would thereby be lost to his family, he was thus driven by force to take the course he did.

== Sources ==
- Bosworth, C. E. (1968). "The Political and Dynastic History of the Iranian World (A.D. 1000–1217)". In Boyle, John Andrew (ed.). The Cambridge History of Iran: The Saljuq and Mongol Periods. Vol. 5. Cambridge: Cambridge University Press. pp. 1–202. ISBN 0-521-06936-X.
- Madelung, W. (1975). "The Minor Dynasties of Northern Iran". In Frye, Richard N. (ed.). The Cambridge History of Iran: From the Arab Invasion to the Saljuqs. Vol. 4. Cambridge: Cambridge University Press. pp. 198–249. ISBN 0-521-20093-8.
- Chaliand, Gerard (1994). The Art of War in World History: From Antiquity to the Nuclear Age. ISBN 9780520079649.
- de Bruijn, J.T.P. (2010). "KAYKĀVUS B. ESKANDAR". Encyclopaedia Iranica, Online Edition.

Preceded by Anushirvan Sharaf al-Ma'ali	Ziyarid ruler c. 1050–1087	Succeeded by Gilanshah
