= Al-Hasan ibn al-Fairuzan =

10th-century Daylamite prince

'Al-Hasan ibn al-Fairuzan
- Persian: الحسن بن الفیروزان

Ruler of Simnan
- In office c. 960s–?

Governor of Sari
- In office Mid-930s – ?

Governor of Tabaristan
- In office 930–?

Personal details
- Children: 3+, including Firuzan and Nasr
- Parent: Al-Fairuzan (father)
- Relatives: Makan ibn Kaki (cousin); Abu'l-Hasan Ali (grandson); Buya ibn Hasan (grandson); Fanna Khusraw (grandson); Rukn al-Dawla (son-in-law)
- Dynasty: Firuzanid family

Al-Hasan ibn al-Fairuzan (Persian: الحسن بن الفیروزان) (fl. 10th century) was a Daylamite prince from the Firuzanid family.

== Biography ==
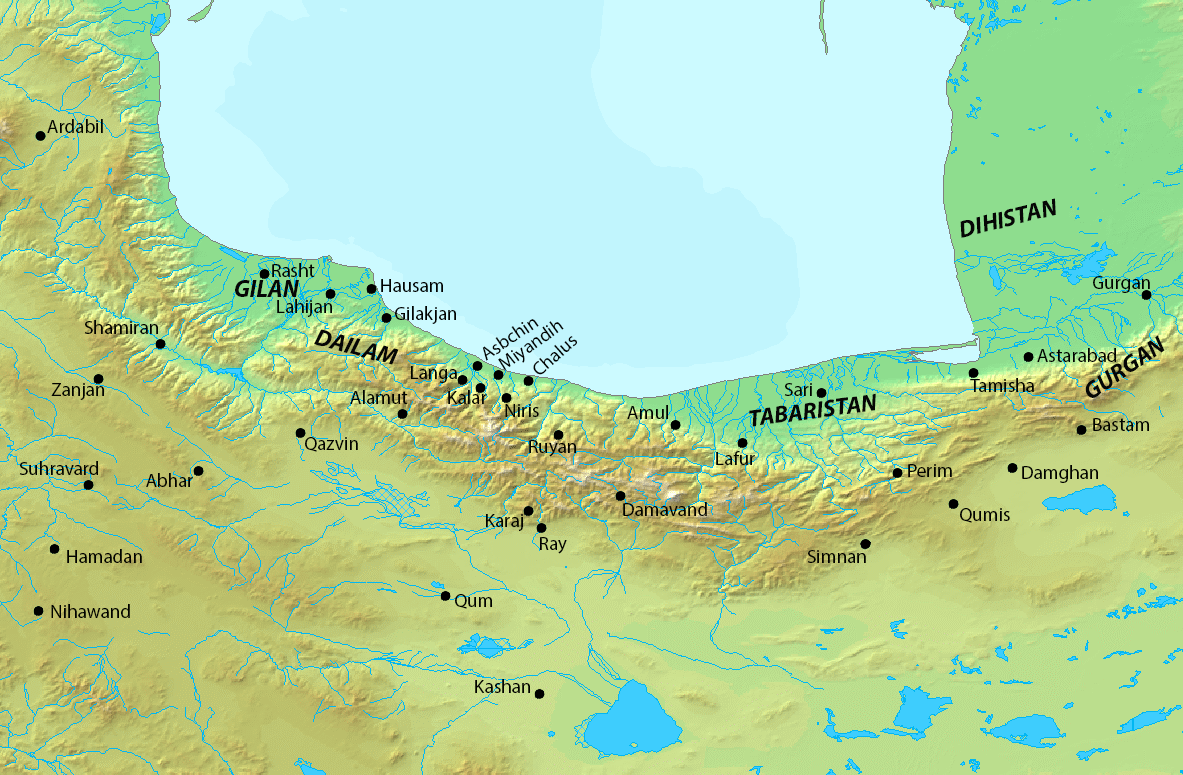
Map of northern Iran

Al-Hasan was the son of Fairuzan, a Daylamite soldier who, along with his brother Kaki, served the Alid dynasties of northern Iran. In 902, both of them were killed during a Samanid invasion of Tabaristan. Kaki had a son named Makan ibn Kaki, who together with al-Hasan served the Alids. Makan had established family ties through marriage with the Alids, as Ja'far, the son of imam Hasan ibn Ali al-Utrush (r. 914–917), was his son-in-law. The latter was engaged in a complex struggle against al-Utrush's designated successor Abu Muhammad Hasan ibn Qasim, known as the Da'i ila'l-Haqq (r. 917–928), and it was not until 923 that Ja'far and his brother Ahmad succeeded in ousting the Da'i and forcing him to exile. When Ja'far died in 924, he left the throne to Ahmad's son Abu Ali Muhammad, but al-Hasan and Makan deposed Muhammad and installed al-Hasan's half-brother Ismail, a son of Ja'far and the mother of al-Hasan, in his place. Muhammad, however, managed to escape from his captors and with the aid of the Gilaki military chief Asfar ibn Shiruya, who had seized control of Gurgan, defeated the two brothers and retook his throne.

In 930, Makan managed to recover Tabaristan, and appointed al-Hasan as the governor of the region. Makan also made Abu Muhammad Hasan ibn Qasim the imam of the Alids. A fake rumor later spread about the death of Makan, which made al-Hasan, who wanted to install his half-brother Ismail as the imam, rise into rebellion. However, the rebellion failed after Ismail was poisoned at the instigation of Abu Ja'far Husayn's mother. Al-Hasan was shortly driven out from Amol by two officers of Makan named Abu Ali and Abu Musa. Al-Hasan then fled to Daylam. Makan was himself shortly driven out from Tabaristan by the Ziyarid ruler Mardavij.

In 935, Mardavij was assassinated and succeeded by his brother Vushmgir. Makan was appointed by his new overlords, the Samanids, as the governor of Gurgan. Vushmgir himself shortly recognized Samanid suzerainty, and Al-Hasan was appointed as the governor of Sari. Relations between Makan and Vushmgir improved to the point where the former felt secure enough to drop his dependence on the Samanids. As a result, in 939 a Samanid army under Abu 'Ali Chaghani attacked him at Gurgan. Following a seven-month siege of his capital, Makan was forced to flee to Rayy. The Samanid army pursued him, and in a battle fought on 25 December 940 at Iskhabad near Rayy, the Samanid forces were victorious. Makan himself was killed by an arrow, and then beheaded by the victors, who sent his head to the Samanid court in Bukhara.

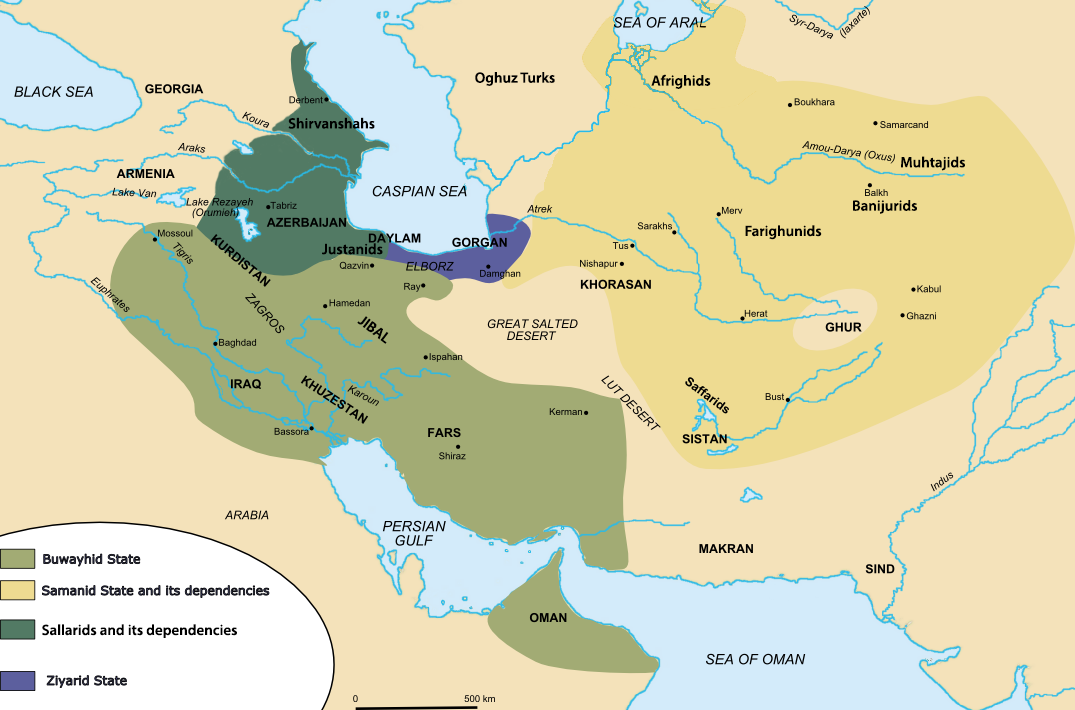
Persia in the mid-10th century

Vushmgir, after the disastrous defeat, fled back to Tabaristan, but al-Hasan, who blamed Vushmgir for the death of his cousin, shortly rebelled against him. Vushmgir managed to defeat him, but al-Hasan convinced Abu 'Ali Chaghani to invade Tabaristan. Vushmgir was forced to recognize Samanid authority again.

When Abu 'Ali Chaghani left for Samanid Khurasan, Vushmgir retook control of Ray. He then lost it for good in 943, to the Buyid ruler Hasan. Returning to Tabaristan, he was defeated there by al-Hasan, who had previously occupied Gurgan. Vushmgir fled to the court of the Bavandid Shahriyar II, and then to the court of the Samanid Nuh I. Al-Hasan meanwhile allied with Hasan, but when Abu 'Ali Chaghani took Ray from the Buyids in 945, he recognized Samanid authority. Still, in 945 Vushmgir captured Gurgan with Samanid support, but did not manage to retain his rule there. It was only in 947 when he was able to take Gurgan and Tabaristan from al-Hasan with the help of a large Samanid army.

In 948, the Buyid ruler Hasan (who since the Buyids' entrance into Baghdad in 945 had used the title Rukn al-Dawla) invaded Tabaristan and Gurgan and took them from Vushmgir. While al-Hasan supported the Buyids, Vushmgir relied on his Samanid allies. Al-Hasan thereafter disappears from the history chronicles, and is first mentioned again in 967 after the death of Vushmgir, as the ruler of Simnan, and aiding Vushmgir's son Qabus in his claims for the Ziyarid throne.

The fate of al-Hasan after this is unknown, he had two sons named Firuzan ibn al-Hasan and Nasr ibn al-Hasan. He also had a daughter who married Rukn al-Dawla, and bore him three sons named Abu'l-Hasan Ali, Buya ibn Hasan, and Fanna Khusraw.

== Sources ==
- Madelung, W. (1975). "The Minor Dynasties of Northern Iran". In Frye, R.N. (ed.). The Cambridge History of Iran, Volume 4: From the Arab Invasion to the Saljuqs. Cambridge: Cambridge University Press. pp. 198–249. ISBN 978-0-521-20093-6.
- Nazim, M. (1987). "Mākān b. Kākī". In Houtsma, Martijn Theodoor (ed.). E.J. Brill's first encyclopaedia of Islam, 1913–1936, Volume V: L–Moriscos. Leiden: BRILL. pp. 164–165. ISBN 90-04-08265-4.
- Blair, Sheila (1992). The Monumental Inscriptions from Early Islamic Iran and Transoxiana. BRILL. pp. 1–307. ISBN 9789004093676.
- Ibn, Isfandiyar (1905). An Abridged Translation of the History of Tabaristan. University of Michigan: BRILL. pp. 1–356. ISBN 9789004093676. "'."
