= Vushmgir =

Ziyarid emir from 935 to 967

Emir of Tabaristan
- Reign: January 935 – December 967
- Predecessor: Mardavij
- Successor: Bisutun
- Born: Unknown; Gilan
- Died: December 967; Iran
- Issue: Salar; Langar; Bisutun; Qabus
- Dynasty: Ziyarid
- Father: Ziyar
- Mother: Daughter of Tirdad Gil

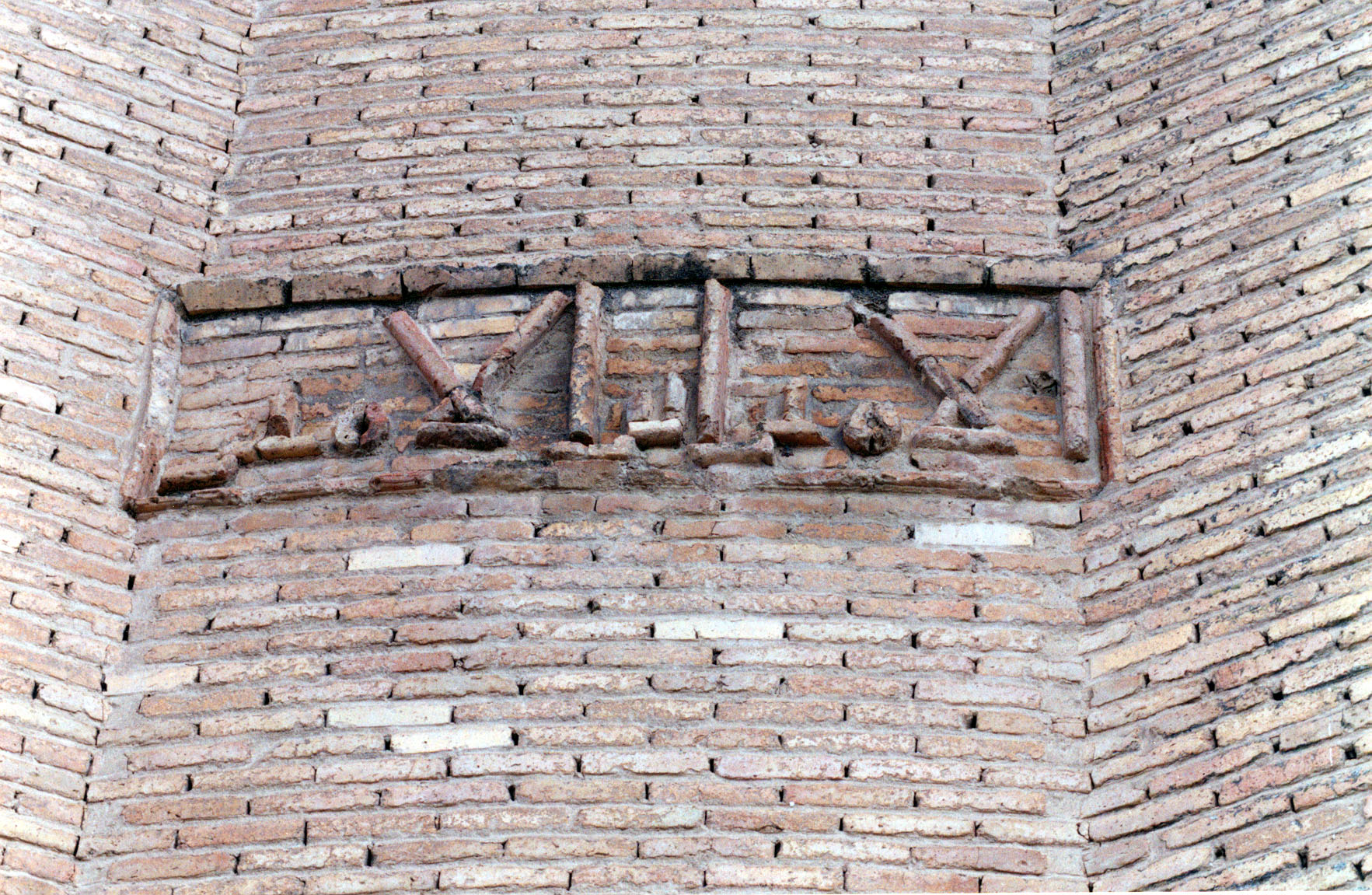
فارسی: کتیبه

Zahir al-Dawla Vushmgir (Note: (Persian: ظهیرالدوله وشمگیر), mostly known as Vushmgir (also spelled as Voshmgir, Voshmger, Wushmgir, Wushmagir and Washmgir)) was the second Ziyarid emir who ruled from 935 until his death in December 967. He was a son of Ziyar. Voshmgir means "quail catcher" in the local Caspian Iranian dialects.

== Origins and early life ==
Vushmgir was the son of Ziyar. He belonged to the Arghich tribe, which claimed to be descended from Arghush Farhadan, king of Gilan who lived during the time of Kai Khosrow. The religion of Ziyar and his family is not exactly known. Zoroastrianism, including heterodox branches such as the Mazdakite, the Zurvanite and Gayomarthian, was still popular at his time, and many Islamic sources describe the Daylamite and Gilite leaders of the time as "atheists". Vushmgir is most commonly considered to have been a Muslim, particularly Zaydi Shiite, but he has also been described as Zoroastrian at least in his earlier years. During his early life, Vushmgir lived in Gilan, which was then under control of the Alids.

== Rise to power ==
In 931, Mardavij, the brother of Vushmgir and king of the Ziyarid dynasty, sent an army to conquer Tabaristan from Makan ibn Kaki, but was defeated. One year later, Mardavij and Vushgmir defeated Makan and conquered Tabaristan. Vushmgir was then appointed as governor of Amol. In 931, Vushmgir captured Isfahan from the Buyid Ali ibn Buya.

In 935, Voshmgir's brother Mardavij was murdered by his Turkish troops. Many of the Turks then defected; some entered the service of the Buyid Hasan, while others under Bajkam traveled to the Abbasid caliph in Baghdad. Hasan took advantage of this situation by stripping Isfahan from Ziyarid rule. The Dailamite and Gilite troops, however, pledged their support to Voshmgir, who was in Ray. That same year, he defeated a Samanid army, as well as the Dailamite Makan, which had together invaded Tabaristan. Voshmgir then wrested Gorgan from Samanid control.

== Reign ==
Voshmgir soon decided to acknowledge Samanid supremacy, and in 936 he also turned over Gorgan to Makan. Turning against Hasan, he retook Isfahan in 938. In 939 or 940 the Samanid governor Abu 'Ali ibn Muhtaj attacked Gorgan; Voshmgir sent Makan aid, but the city fell after a long siege. Ibn Muhtaj then engaged Voshmgir and Makan at Iskhabad. During the first phase of the battle, Vushmgir fled from the battlefield, leaving Makan behind. Many of Makan's elite units were shortly killed, while he himself was shot in the head by an arrow, and then beheaded by the victorious Samanid soldiers, who sent his head, along with many captured high-ranking Dailamite officers, to the Samanid court in Bukhara.

When Voshmgir arrived to Tabaristan, he was faced there with a revolt by his governor of Sari, al-Hasan ibn al-Fairuzan, who was a cousin of Makan and blamed Vushmgir for his death. Voshmgir defeated him, but al-Hasan convinced Ibn Muhtaj to invade Tabaristan. Voshmgir was forced to recognize Samanid authority again. Hasan furthered the Ziyarid's troubles by retaking Isfahan in 940.

When Ibn Muhtaj left for Samanid Khurasan, Voshmgir retook control of Ray. However, in 943, a battle was fought near the city between Vushmgir and Hasan. During the battle, two of Vushmgir's officers, Shir Mardi and Gurigir, mutinied against him and joined Hasan. Vushmgir was shortly defeated, losing Ray for good. He then returned to Tabaristan, but was defeated there by al-Hasan, who had previously occupied Gorgan. Voshmgir fled to the court of the Bavandid Shahriyar II, and then to the court of the Samanid Nuh I, where he was treated well. Al-Hasan meanwhile allied with Hasan. During the same time, an officer of Vushmgir named Isfahi, who had recently returned to Tabaristan, not knowing that Vushmgir was gone, quickly discovered the fact and went to a fortress, where he fortified himself. A revolt shortly broke out against al-Hasan, who had many of Vushmgir's officers killed, including Isfahi.

Vushmgir, with the aid of 30,000 Samanid troops under their general Qaratakin, captured Gurgan in 945, and set forth to conquer the rest of Tabaristan. Al-Hasan then fled to a fortress, where he could prepare for a counter-attack. Vushmgir, however, managed to defeat al-Hasan and capture the fortress. Al-Hasan once again fled, and this time took refuge with the Paduspanid ruler. Vushmgir then marched there and defeated the Paduspanids, forcing Al-Hasan to flee to yet another fortress. Vushmgir's pursuit was then cut short when he was ambushed by the Buyid ruler Hasan, and forced to flee back to the Samanid border. There, he again requested reinforcements from the Samanid ruler Nuh I, who sent another army to aid him. This time the campaign was successful: in 947, Vushmgir managed to defeat al-Hasan and expel him from Tabaristan, gaining control over the region once again.

In 948 Hasan (who, since the Buyids' entrance into Baghdad, in 945 had used the title Rukn al-Dawla) invaded Tabaristan and Gorgan and took them from Voshmgir. While al-Hasan supported the Buyids, Voshmgir relied on his Samanid allies. Tabaristan and Gorgan changed hands several times until 955, when, in a treaty with the Samanids, Rukn al-Dawla promised to leave Voshmgir alone in Tabaristan. Peace between the two sides did not last long, however; in 958 Voshmgir briefly occupied Ray, which was Rukn al-Dawla's capital. Rukn al-Dawla later counterattacked, temporarily taking Gorgan in 960, then Tabaristan and Gorgan for a short time in 962. He may have also taken Tabaristan and Gorgan in 966, but did not hold on to them for long.

== Death ==
Voshmgir was killed by a boar during a hunt in December 967, shortly after a Samanid army had arrived for a joint campaign against the Buyids. He was succeeded by his eldest son Bisutun, although the Samanid army attempted to put another son, Qabus, into power. A third son predeceased him in 964 in the fighting over Hausam.

== Sources ==
- Madelung, W. (1975). "The Minor Dynasties of Northern Iran". In Frye, Richard N. (ed.). The Cambridge History of Iran: From the Arab Invasion to the Saljuqs. Vol. 4. Cambridge: Cambridge University Press. pp. 198–249. ISBN 0-521-20093-8.
- Bosworth, C. E. (1975). "Iran under the Buyids". In Frye, Richard N. (ed.). The Cambridge History of Iran: From the Arab Invasion to the Saljuqs. Vol. 4. Cambridge: Cambridge University Press. pp. 250–305. ISBN 0-521-20093-8.
- Nazim, M. (1987). "Mākān b. Kākī". In Houtsma, Martijn Theodoor (ed.). E.J. Brill's first encyclopaedia of Islam, 1913–1936, Volume V: L–Moriscos. Leiden: BRILL. pp. 164–165. ISBN 90-04-08265-4.
- Ibn Isfandiyar, Muhammad ibn al-Hasan (1905). An Abridged Translation of the History of Tabaristan. Translated by Browne, Edward Granville. University of Michigan: BRILL. pp. 1–356. ISBN 9789004093676. "'."

Preceded by Mardavij	Ziyarid ruler 935–967	Succeeded by Bisutun
