= Qabus =

Ziyarid emir (977–981, 997–1012)

- Emir of the Ziyarid dynasty
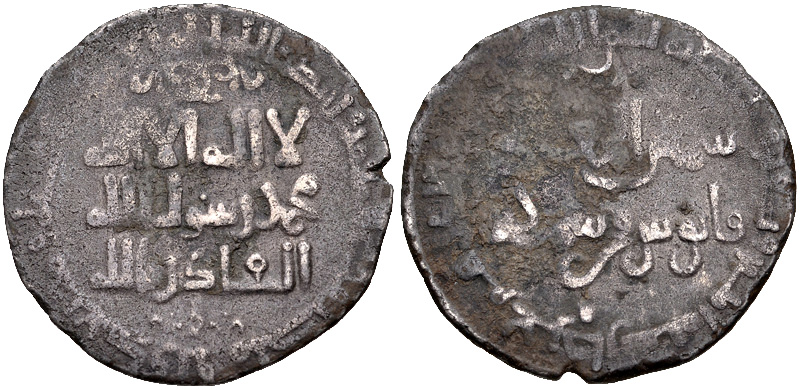
- Coin of Qabus minted in Jurjan

Emir of Tabaristan
- Reign: 997 – 1012
- Predecessor: Fakhr al-Dawla (as Buyid Emir)
- Successor: Manuchihr
- Reign: 977 – 981
- Predecessor: Bisutun
- Successor: Mu'ayyad al-Dawla (as Buyid Emir)
- Born: 10th century
- Died: 1012; Gorgan
- Issue: Manuchihr; Iskandar
- House: Ziyarid
- Father: Vushmgir
- Religion: Islam

Qabus ibn Wushmagir (full name: Abol-Hasan Qābūs ibn Wušmagīr ibn Ziyar Sams al-maʿālī, ابوالحسن قابوس بن وشمگیر بن زیار, شمس‌المعالی; (died 1012) (r. 977–981; 997–1012) was the Ziyarid ruler of Gurgan and Tabaristan in medieval Iran. His father was Vushmgir and his mother was a daughter of the Bavandi Ispahbad Sharwin II.

== Struggle for power ==
Upon Vushmgir's death in 967, his eldest son Bisutun marched to the capital Gurgan to take control of the Ziyarid state. A Samanid army that had arrived shortly before Vushmgir's death for a joint campaign against the Buyids, however, threw its support behind Qabus. When Bisutun gained the assistance of the Buyid Rukn al-Dawla the Samanid army left for Khurasan. Qabus found a new ally in al-Hasan ibn al-Fairuzan, who ruled in Semnan, but Bisutun occupied both Gurgan and Semnan, forcing Qabus to give up his claims as his father's successor.

== Reign ==
Bisutun's death in 977 provided Qabus with another opportunity to take control of the Ziyarids. Bisutun's governor of Tabaristan, the Gilite Dubaj ibn Bani, supported the deceased ruler's young son, and could rely on Samanid support. Qabus gained the loyalty of the Ziyarid army, however, and received assistance from the Buyid 'Adud al-Dawla. Taking Gurgan from Dubaj, he captured Bisutun's son in Semnan. In 978 or 979 the caliph al-Ta'i granted Qabus the title Shams al-Ma'ali.

In 980 Qabus offered refuge to the Buyid ruler of Ray, Fakhr al-Dawla, who had recently fought a losing war with 'Adud al-Dawla. The latter offered the Ziyarid money and territory in exchange for the surrender of Fakhr al-Dawla, but Qabus refused. 'Adud then invaded and conquered Tabaristan; in 981 'Adud's brother Mu'ayyad al-Dawla took Gurgan. Qabus and Fakhr al-Dawla were forced to flee to Samanid Khurasan. The Samanids sent a force to take back the provinces, but were unsuccessful.

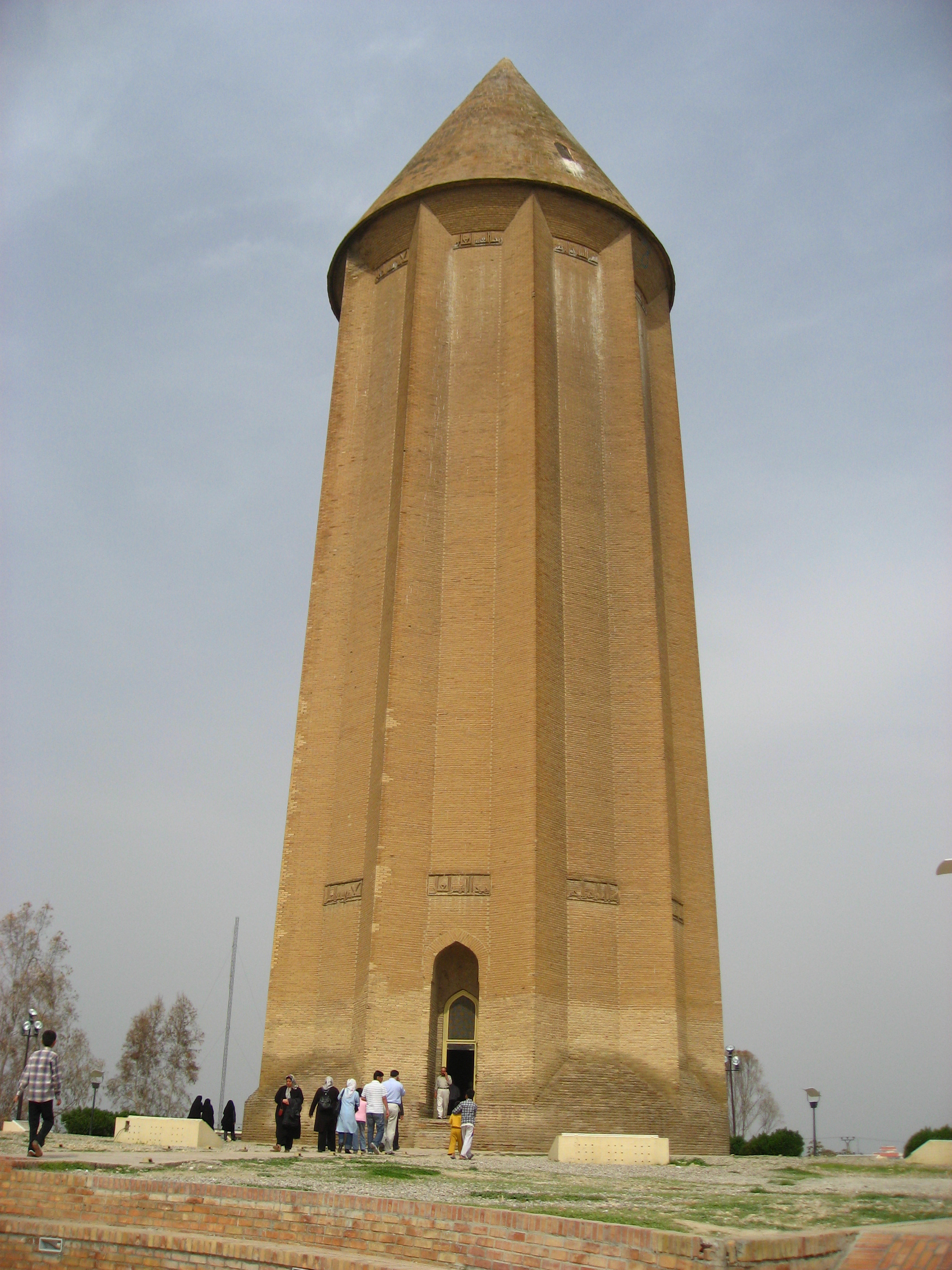
Tomb of Qabus in Gonbad-e Qabus

In 984 Fakhr al-Dawla was able to recover his territories in Ray. Upon the advice of his vizier, however, he refused to return control of Gurgan and Tabaristan to Qabus. Qabus was forced to live in exile until 997, when Fakhr al-Dawla died and was succeeded by his young son Majd al-Dawla. Supporters of the Ziyarid gained control of Tabaristan and from there conquered Gurgan. Qabus returned there in 998. A few later Buyid attempts to expel him again failed.

Although he formally recognized the caliph as his sovereign, Qabus ruled effectively as an independent ruler for the rest of his reign. He opened up relations with Mahmud of Ghazna, setting the stage for the eventual Ghaznavid takeover of the Ziyarids, while the Buyids did not undertake any more campaigns against him. Internal troubles, however, soon cost Qabus his position. His heavy-handed approach with officials in the army eventually caused a conspiracy to be formed against him.

The army leaders failed to capture him in his castle outside Gurgan, but they took control of the capital and invited Qabus's son Manuchihr, the governor of Tabaristan, to take over. Manuchihr feared that he would lose the succession if he refused and joined the conspirators. He chased Qabus to Bistam, where the latter eventually agreed to abdicate. The conspirators then sent Qabus to a castle in Gorgan. While on the way to the castle, Qabus asked one of the rebels, named Abdallah, who was behind the conspiracy. Abdallah responded by naming five generals, and also said that he was one of the men who played an important role in the conspiracy. He then blamed Qabus' cruelty as the reason for his downfall. Qabus agreed, and told Abdallah that he should have ordered the execution of Abdallah and the other perpetrators before the conspiracy began. Qabus then arrived to the castle where he could spend the rest of his life in devotion. The conspirators, however, still considered him to be a threat and had him frozen to death in 1012.

The tower of Gonbad Kavous was built for him as his tomb, and he is the subject of the Qabus nama, a major work of Persian literature from the eleventh century, which was written by his grandson Keikavus.

Preceded by Bisutun	Ziyarid ruler 977–1012	Succeeded by Manuchihr
