= Makan ibn Kaki =

Iranian Daylamite military leader (died 940)

Abu Mansur Makan ibn Kaki (died 25 December 940) was a Daylamite military leader active in northern Iran (esp. Tabaristan and western Khurasan) in the early 10th century. He became involved in the succession disputes of the Alids of Tabaristan, and managed to establish himself as the ruler of Tabaristan and Gurgan for short periods of time, in competition to other Daylamite warlords such as Asfar ibn Shiruya or the Ziyarid brothers Mardavij and Vushmgir. He alternately opposed and secured support from the Samanid governors of Khurasan, and eventually fell in battle against a Samanid army.

== Biography ==
Like his father, Makan served as an officer in the army of the Alids of Tabaristan, a Zaydi branch of the Alids that had established an independent emirate in Tabaristan, on the southern shore of the Caspian Sea, which periodically included some neighbouring regions (Daylam, Gilan and Gurgan) as well. Makan had established family ties through marriage with the Alids, as Ja'far, the son of imam Hasan ibn Ali al-Utrush (r. 914–917), was his son-in-law. The latter was engaged in a complex struggle against al-Utrush's designated successor Abu Muhammad Hasan ibn Qasim (r. 917–928), known as the Da'i ila'l-Haqq ("Missionary of the True Faith"), and it was not until 923 that Ja'far and his brother Ahmad succeeded in ousting the Da'i and forcing him to exile. Makan was then appointed governor of Gurgan, the easternmost province of the Alid emirate. When Ja'far died in 924, he left the throne to Ahmad's son Abu Ali Muhammad, but Makan deposed Muhammad and installed his own grand-nephew Ismail, a son of Ja'far, in his place. Muhammad, however, managed to escape from his captors and with the aid of the Daylamite military chief Asfar ibn Shiruya, who had seized control of Gurgan, defeated Makan and retook his throne.

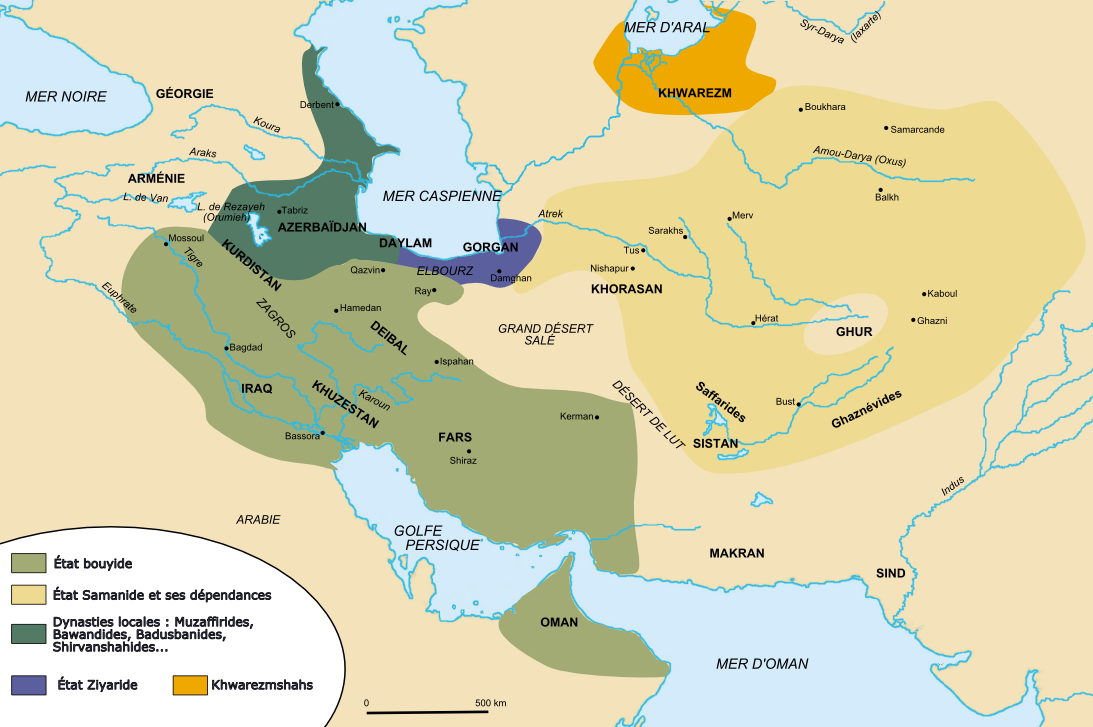
Persia in the mid-10th century

Makan escaped the defeat and found refuge in a remote fortress in the mountainous region of Sari. There he remained until Muhammad's death in 926/927, when he issued forth, defeated the Alid army and deposed Muhammad's brother Abu Ja'far Husayn, forcing him to flee to Khurasan. Makan did not claim the emirate for himself, but recalled the Da'i from exile. In 928, Makan and the Da'i took over the province of Rayy at the invitation of its Samanid governor, and advanced into Jibal as far as Qum. Asfar, however, who now governed Gurgan as a Samanid vassal, used the opportunity of their absence to return to Tabaristan and conquer it for himself. The Da'i returned to oppose Asfar, but was mortally wounded before his capital, Amul. Next, Asfar marched on Rayy, where he defeated Makan, who fled to Daylam.

Abu Ja'far Husayn was initially re-installed as imam, but was soon removed to the Samanid capital, Bukhara. The Samanid interlude proved brief, as in 930, Makan managed to recover Tabaristan, extend his control over most of Gurgan and even take possession of Nishapur in western Khurasan, which he was forced to abandon in 931, bowing to pressure by the Samanid ruler Nasr II. Makan also had to face a rebellion at home, where his relative al-Hasan ibn al-Fairuzan, who governed Tabaristan in his absence, tried to re-install his half-brother Ismail as imam. The revolt failed after Ismail was poisoned at the instigation of Abu Ja'far Husayn's mother. In the meantime, Asfar had lost power in Rayy to the rebellion of his former subordinate, Mardavij, and fled to Quhistan, where he died soon after. Abu Ja'far Husayn, who had managed to escape Samanid captivity, sought Mardavij's aid in recovering his position. Mardavij lent him an army, but Makan defeated Mardavij's forces in a first engagement in 931. Eventually, after Makan's return to Tabaristan from Nishapur, Mardavij launched an attack that conquered Tabaristan.

Makan tried to reclaim his domain with aid from Gilan and Khurasan, but failed. He then sought refuge among the Samanids in Khurasan, where Nasr appointed him governor of Kirman. Makan defeated the incumbent governor and took possession of the province, which he governed until 935, when he learned of Mardavij's assassination at the hands of his own Turkish ghilman. Immediately he left Kirman, secured his appointment as governor of Gurgan (which Mardavij had ceded to the Samanids in exchange for peace in 933) from Nasr, and with the support of Samanid troops tried to recover Tabaristan. Vushmgir, the brother and heir of Mardavij, managed to repel the attack and even conquer Gurgan, but Buyid pressure on his western flank forced him to reach a settlement, recognizing Samanid overlordship and ceding Gurgan to Makan.

Relations between Makan and Vushmgir improved to the point where the former felt secure enough to drop his dependence on the Samanids. As a result, in 939 a Samanid army under Abu Ali ibn Muhtaj attacked him at Gurgan. Following a seven-month siege of his capital, Makan was forced to flee to Rayy. The Samanid army pursued him, and in a battle fought on 25 December 940 at Iskhabad near Rayy, the Samanid forces were victorious. Makan himself was killed by an arrow, and then beheaded by the victors, who sent his head to Nasr in Bukhara.

== Sources ==
- Madelung, W. (1975). "The Minor Dynasties of Northern Iran". In Frye, R.N. (ed.). The Cambridge History of Iran, Volume 4: From the Arab Invasion to the Saljuqs. Cambridge: Cambridge University Press. pp. 198–249. ISBN 978-0-521-20093-6.
- Nazim, M. (1987). "Mākān b. Kākī". In Houtsma, Martijn Theodoor (ed.). E.J. Brill's first encyclopaedia of Islam, 1913–1936, Volume V: L–Moriscos. Leiden: BRILL. pp. 164–165. ISBN 90-04-08265-4.
