= Bisutun =

Ziyarid emir from 967 to 977

Bisutun (بيستون) (died 977) was the ruler of the Ziyarids (967–977). He was the eldest son of Vushmgir.

During his father's lifetime, Bisutun was the governor of Tabaristan Amol. Upon Vushmgir's death in 967 during a hunting expedition, he went to Gurgan to assume power. His ascension was contested, however, by a Samanid army which had arrived shortly before Vushmgir's death for a joint campaign against the Buyid Rukn al-Dawla. The army commander supported making Bisutun's brother Qabus as ruler of the Ziyarids. Bisutun then turned to Rukn al-Dawla, recognizing the latter's sovereignty in an attempt to gain support. The Samanid army soon left Gurgan, returning to Khurasan, but Qabus found the support of al-Hasan ibn al-Fairuzan, who was ruling in Simnan at that time. Bisutun eventually managed to conquer both Gurgan and Simnan, forcing Qabus to give up his claims.

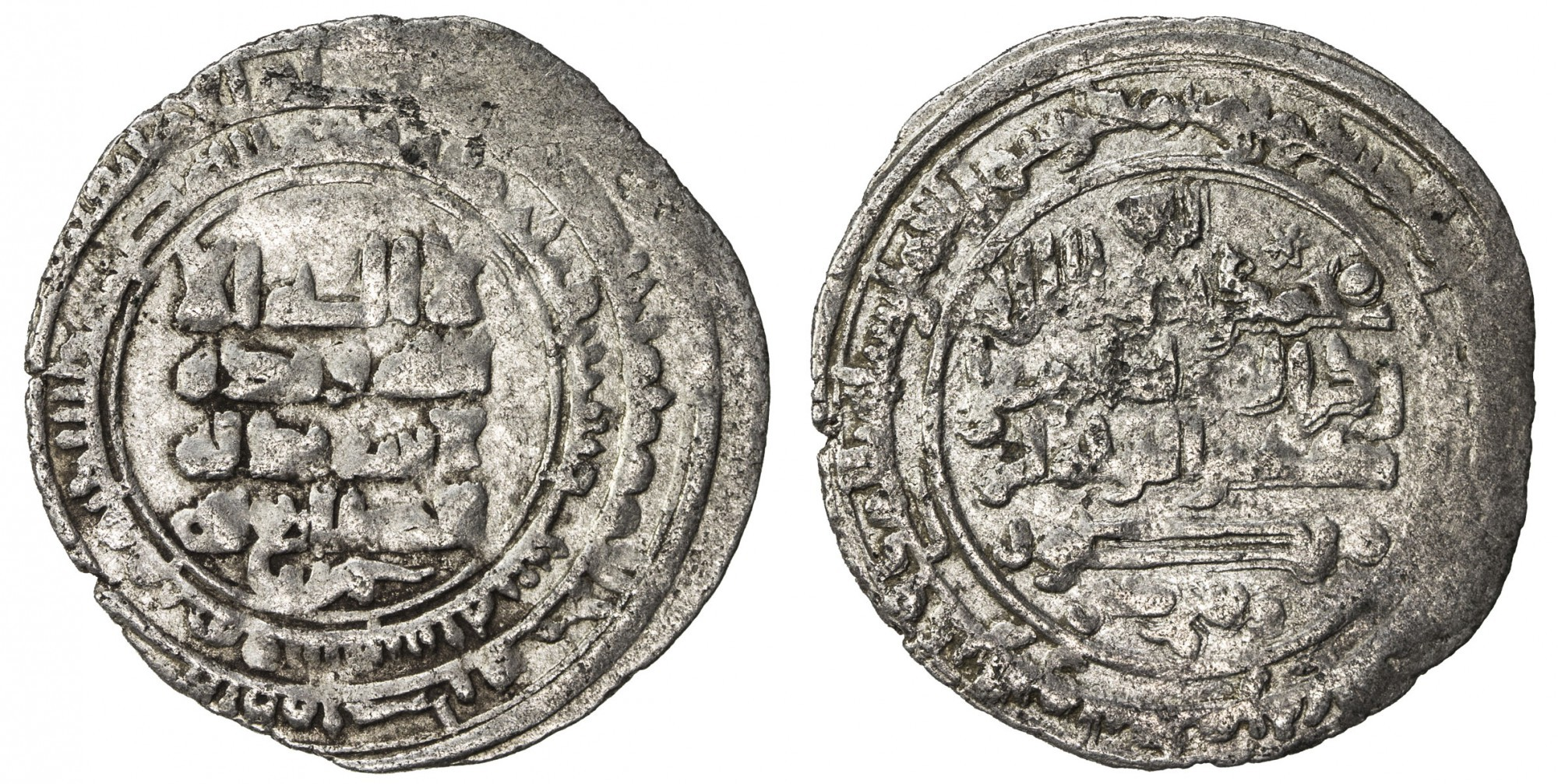
Coin of Bisutun

For the rest of his reign, Bisutun maintained good relations with the Buyids. He married a daughter of 'Adud al-Dawla, the eldest son of Rukn al-Dawla, and in 971 the Caliph al-Muti, who was a Buyid puppet, confirmed upon Bisutun the title of Zahir al-Dawla.

Bisutun also paid attention to his western border. He released the Alid al-Hasan al-Tha'ir, who his father had imprisoned, and gave him money so that he could dislodge the ruler of the coastal town of Hausam (located in Gilan), Abu Muhammad al-Nasir. Al-Hasan al-Tha'ir, however, was defeated and killed by Abu Muhammad. His son Abu'l-Hasan 'Ali eventually expelled Abu Muhammad from Hausam, probably with Bisutun's support, and he acknowledged the Ziyarid as his overlord.

Bisutun died in 977. After a short power struggle, his brother Qabus succeeded him.

Preceded by Vushmgir	Ziyarid ruler 967–977	Succeeded by Qabus
