= Battle of Iskhabad =

940 battle

Battle of Iskhabad (940)
- Part of the Samanid–Ziyarid Wars
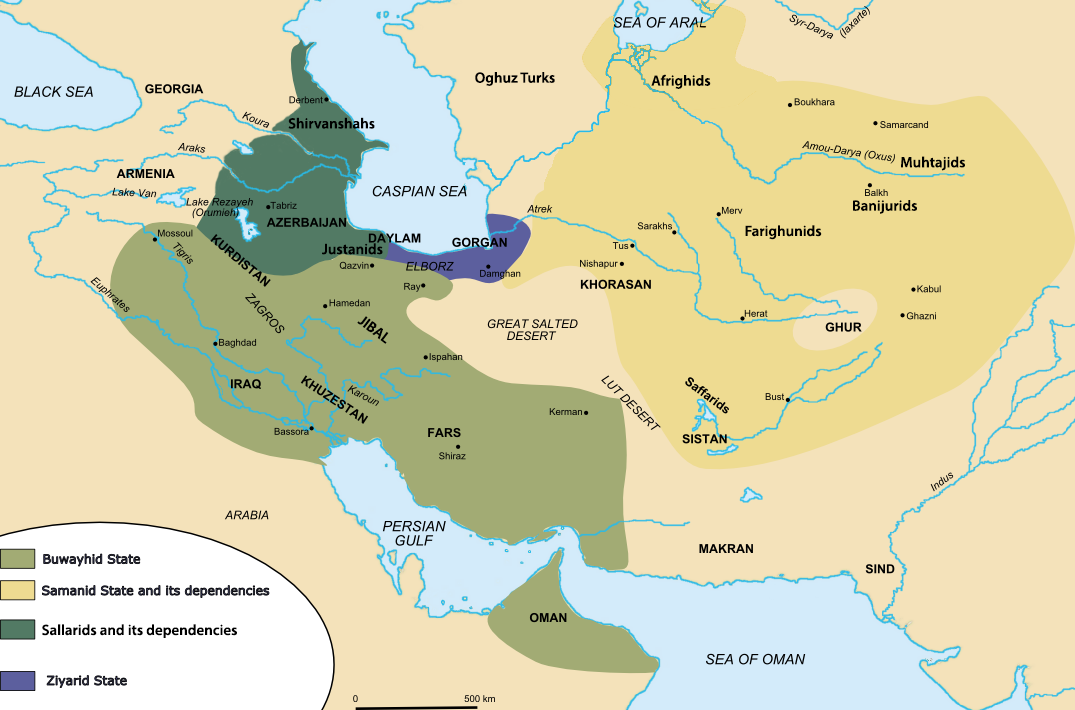
- Persia in the mid-10th century
Date	25 December 940
Location	Iskhabad, near Ray
Result	Samanid-Buyid victory

Belligerents
Samanids	Ziyarid dynasty Firuzanids

Commanders and leaders
Abu 'Ali Chaghani	Vushmgir; Makan ibn Kaki †

Casualties and losses
Low	More than half of the soldiers were killed. The rest were either captured or wounded.

The Battle of Iskhabad (Persian: نبرد اسحاق‌آباد), was a major engagement fought in 940 at Iskhabad, near Ray, between the Samanids, led by Abu 'Ali Chaghani, and the combined forces of the Ziyarids and Firuzanids under the Emir Vushmgir and Makan ibn Kaki. During the first phase of the battle, Vushmgir fled from the battlefield, leaving Makan behind. Many of Makan's elite units were shortly killed, while he himself was shot in the head by an arrow, and then beheaded by the victorious Samanid soldiers, who sent his head, along with many captured high-ranking Daylamite officers, to the Samanid court in Bukhara.

== Sources ==
- Madelung, W. (1975). "The Minor Dynasties of Northern Iran". In Frye, R.N. (ed.). The Cambridge History of Iran, Volume 4: From the Arab Invasion to the Saljuqs. Cambridge: Cambridge University Press. pp. 198–249. ISBN 978-0-521-20093-6.
- Nazim, M. (1987). "Mākān b. Kākī". In Houtsma, Martijn Theodoor (ed.). E.J. Brill's first encyclopaedia of Islam, 1913–1936, Volume V: L–Moriscos. Leiden: BRILL. pp. 164–165. ISBN 90-04-08265-4.
- Ibn, Isfandiyar (1905). An Abridged Translation of the History of Tabaristan. University of Michigan: BRILL. pp. 1–356. ISBN 9789004093676. "'."
