= Reuben Levy =

British academic (1891–1966)

Reuben Levy (28 April 1891 – 6 September 1966) was Professor of Persian at the University of Cambridge. He wrote on Persian literature and Islamic history.

== Life ==
Levy was educated at the Friars School, Bangor, the University College of North Wales, Bangor and Jesus College, Oxford, studying Persian, Turkish and the Semitic languages. His First Persian teacher was Isa Sedigh.

During the First World War, he was a captain in General Staff Intelligence in Mesopotamia (1916 to 1918), and worked in the Iraq Political Service (1918 to 1920). He lectured in Persian at Oxford from 1920 to 1923 before living in the United States from 1923 to 1926. He moved to the University of Cambridge in 1926 as Lecturer in Persian, and became Professor of Persian in 1950, the chair being created for him. He was also a Fellow of Christ's College, Cambridge. During the Second World War, he was a Squadron Leader in RAF Intelligence.

== Works ==
His first book, Persian Literature (1923), was written when he was still a lecturer at Oxford. A Baghdad Chronicle (1929) was an account of the Muslim Middle Ages and Abbasid Caliphate. It led to his major work, The Sociology of Islam (2 volumes, 1931–33) (reissued in 1957 as The Social Structure of Islam), which was regarded as a new approach to Muslim history. He also produced translations and critical editions of texts, including the 11th century Persian text Qabus nama (A Mirror for Princes, 1951), The Tales of Marzuban (1959) and The Shah-nama (1966).
