= Gonbad-e Qabus (tower) =

Gonbad-e Qābus
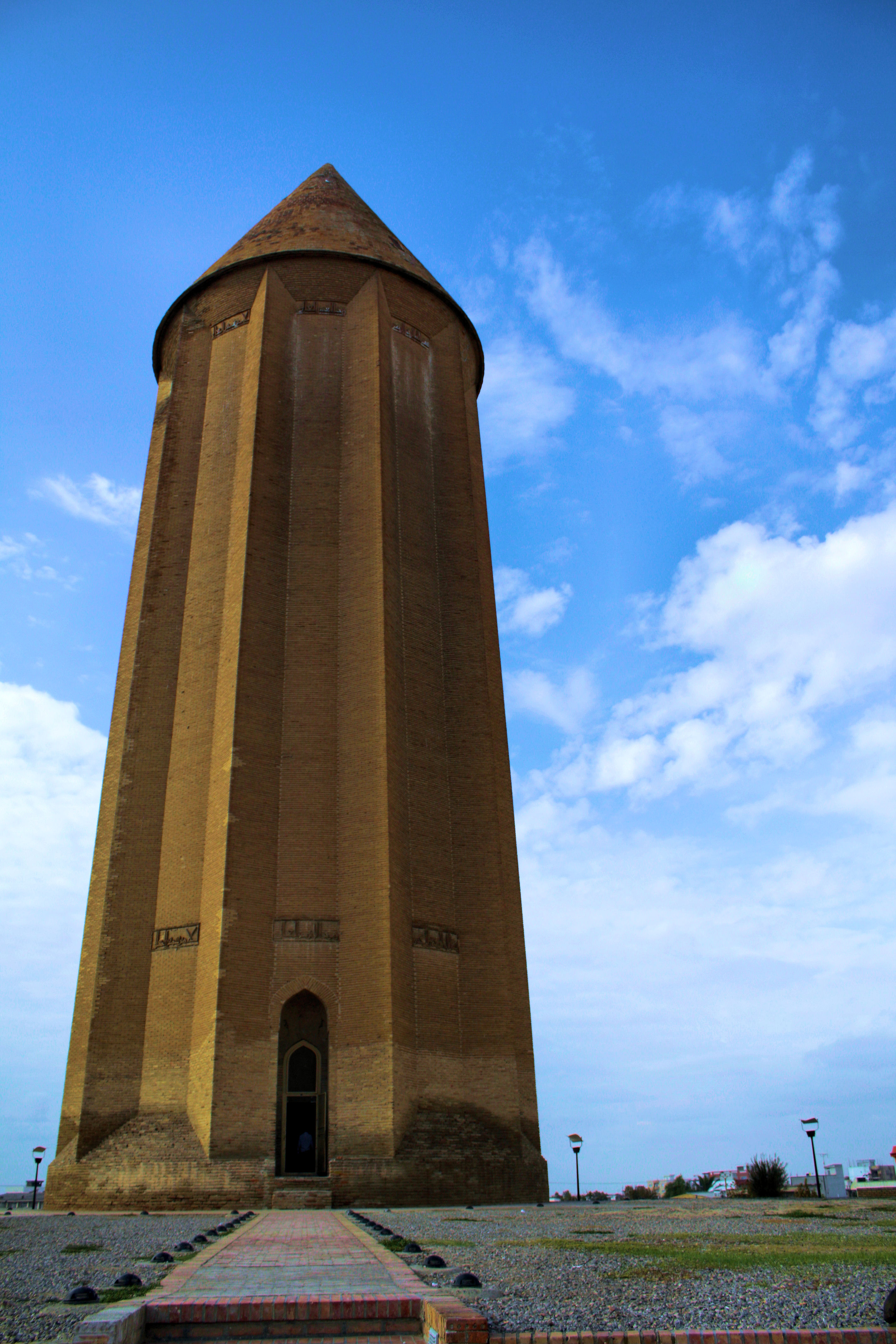

- Location within Iran
- 37°15′29″N 55°10′8.4″E

Site notes
- Area: 1.48 ha (3.7 acres)

UNESCO World Heritage Site
- Official name: Kavus Tower
- Type: Cultural
- Criteria: i, ii, iii, iv
- Designated: 2012 (36th session)
- Reference no.
- Region: Asia-Pacific

Iran National Heritage List
- Official name: Kavus Tower
- Type: Funerary Tower
- Designated: 1932
- Reference no.: 86
- Conservation organization: Cultural Heritage, Handicrafts and Tourism Organization of Iran

Gonbad-e Qabus or Gonbad-e Qabus Tower (Persian: برج گنبد قابوس) is a monument in Gonbad-e Qabus, Iran, and a UNESCO World Heritage Site since 2012. It marks the grave of Ziyarid ruler Qabus (r. 978–1012), and was built during his lifetime in 1006/7. It is a cylindrical tomb tower that reaches c. 61 metres (200 feet) and can be seen from some 30 kilometres (19 miles) away. (Note: 11 metres (36 feet) of its total height (i.e. of the 61 metres (200 feet) is located underground.) The eponymous city is named after the monument.

Considered to be a masterpiece of Iranian architecture, according to Oleg Grabar, it achieves an "almost perfect balance between a purpose (princely glory beyond death), a form (cylindrical tower transformed into a star), and a single material (brick)". The Gonbad-e Qabus tower is the best known tower tomb in northern Iran and was featured in many publications.

== Construction, plan and design ==
The inscription bands on the tower, written in rhymed prose, state that Qabus ordered the foundation of the tower built during his lifetime, in 1006/7. He was a prince of the Ziyarid dynasty, which was based in the historic Tabaristan region of northern Iran. In the 11th century, this region was still undergoing conversion from Zoroastrianism to Islam.

The foundation date on the monument is given in two calendar styles: Iranian solar and Islamic lunar. The monument has an interior diameter of 9.67 metres (31.7 feet) at its base. According to Sheila S. Blair (2002), the building's entrance contains some of the earliest evidence of the development of the moqarnas structure (i.e. stalactite vaulting) in Iran. In terms of design, the Gonbad-e Qabus tower resembles other cylindrical tomb towers on Iran's Caspian Sea littoral. However, the Gonbad-e Qabus tower differs from other examples because of its "extraordinary height". Taking its conical roof into account, the tower measures c. 50 metres (160 feet) above ground; this is three times its exterior diameter. Sheila S. Blair notes:

The tomb is entirely constructed of fine-quality baked brick whose pale yellow color has been turned golden by the sun. The technical quality of the construction is clear from its almost perfect survival despite the ravages of time, climate, and even reported shelling by the Russians. The only decoration comprises two inscription bands which ring the building above the doorway and below the roof. Each band is divided into ten panels, one set between each pair of buttresses. (...) The carefully planned text combines with the tower's formal purity and soaring verticality to make it one of the most famous and memorable monuments in all of Iranian architecture.

Oleg Grabar (1975) wrote that the Gonbad-e Qabus tower "clearly belongs to the general category of a secular architecture for conspicuous consumption". While discussing the forms of the tower tombs of northern Iran (which includes the Gonbad-e Qabus tower), Grabar stated that they may be connected with Zoroastrian funerary structures. According to him, the link to Zoroastrian funerary structures is "strongly suggested". He cites as examples the use of the Persian solar calendar in the inscription on the Gonbad-e Qabus, as well as the occasional use of Middle Persian (Pahlavi) on the other tomb towers of northern Iran. According to Melanie Michailidis (2009), Zoroastrian influence is "manifestly present" in the tower tombs of northern Iran, and can be seen in their height, purpose, and forms. She argues that the towers were built by the Ziyarids and Bavandids to emulate "the lost princely mausolea of the Sasanians".

Though the tower is meant to be Qabus's mausoleum, there is no body buried inside, similar to the other tomb towers of northern Iran. According to legend, Qabus was buried in a glass coffin, hanging from the roof by chains. Michailidis adds that the "failure of the excavators to find a body might seem to lend credence to this story". She explains that the towers were used in a syncretic fashion. Bodies were placed inside the tombs, but lifted off the ground, resting on a platform "composed of some impermeable material". As Tabaristan was still undergoing Islamization at the time, syncretism would be a logical explanation according to Michailidis. Qabus's tower meets numerous criteria for disposing of the dead in the Zoroastrian way, but it does not "obviously" fit the category of an "orthodox Zoroastrian way of disposing of the dead", nor does it match a "proper Muslim burial".

== Cultural references ==
The tower is the goal of a meandering geographical quest in Robert Byron's autobiographical travelogue The Road to Oxiana (1937).

== Gallery ==
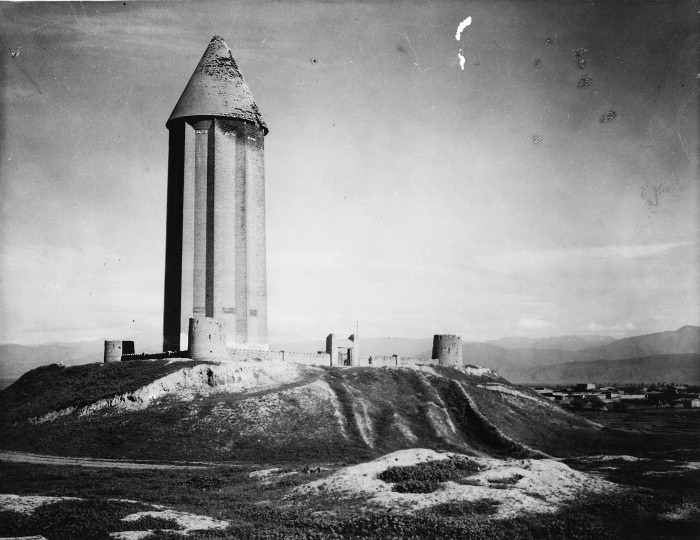
An old image of Gonbad-e Qabus.

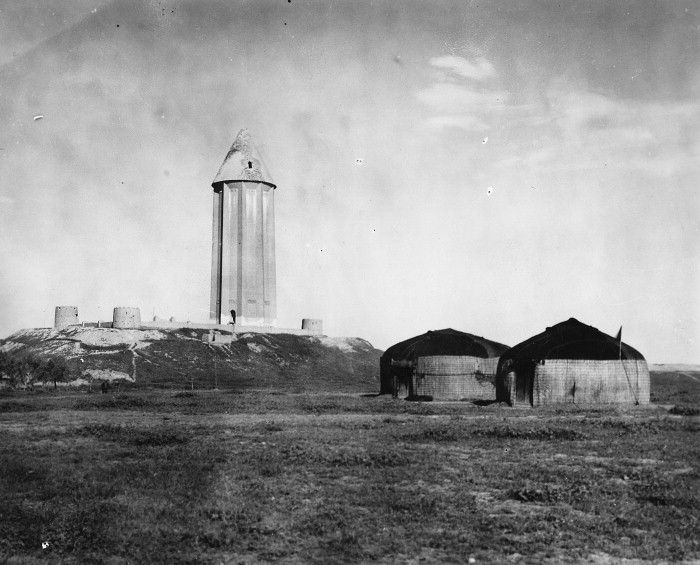
An old image of Gonbad-e Qabus.

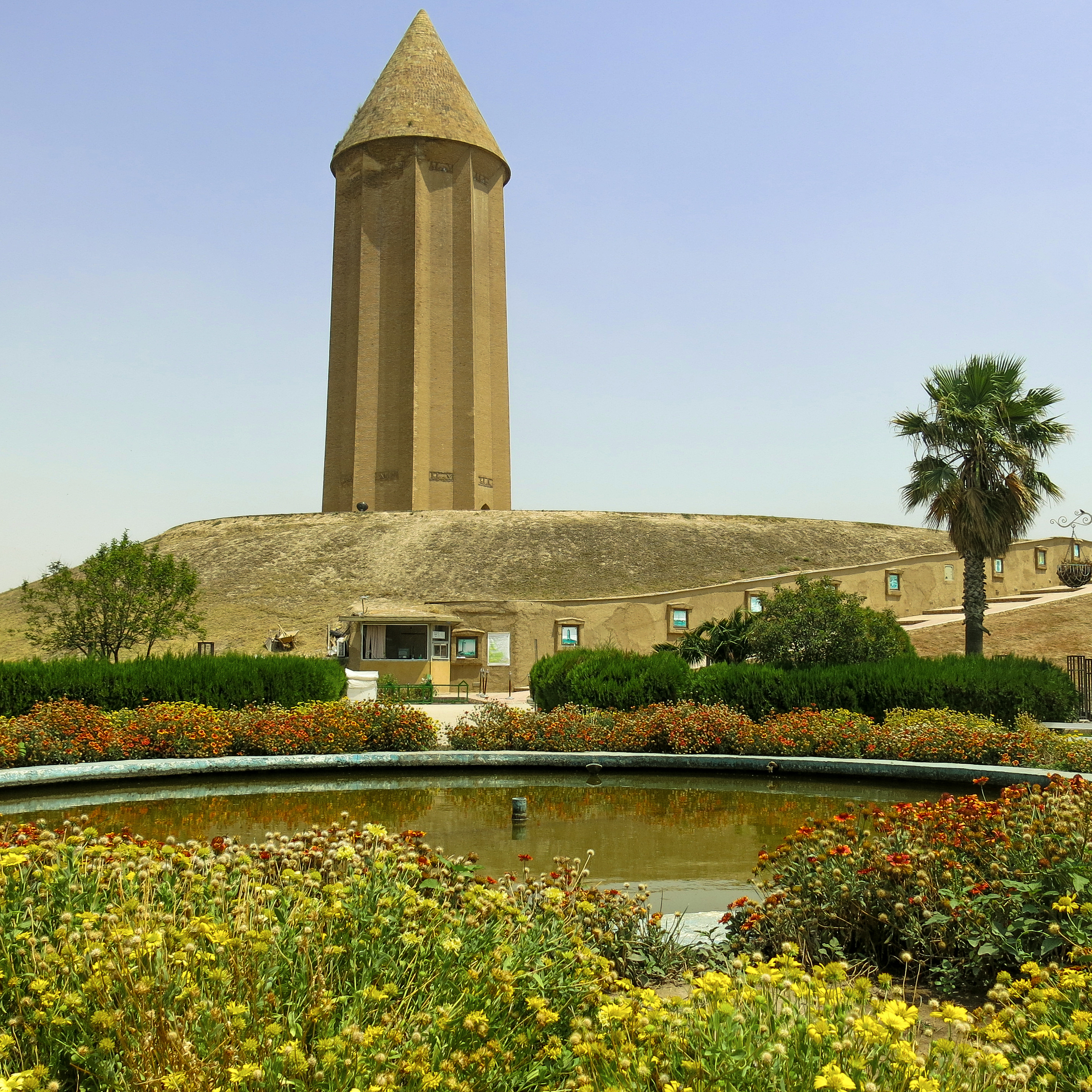
Gonbad-e Qabus in July 2014.

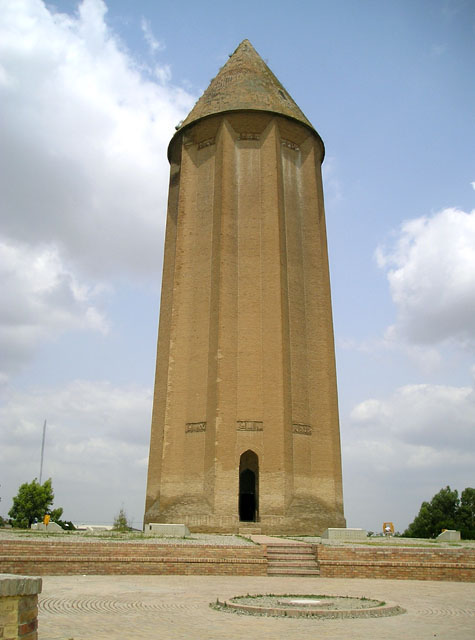
Gonbad-e Qabus in October 2014.

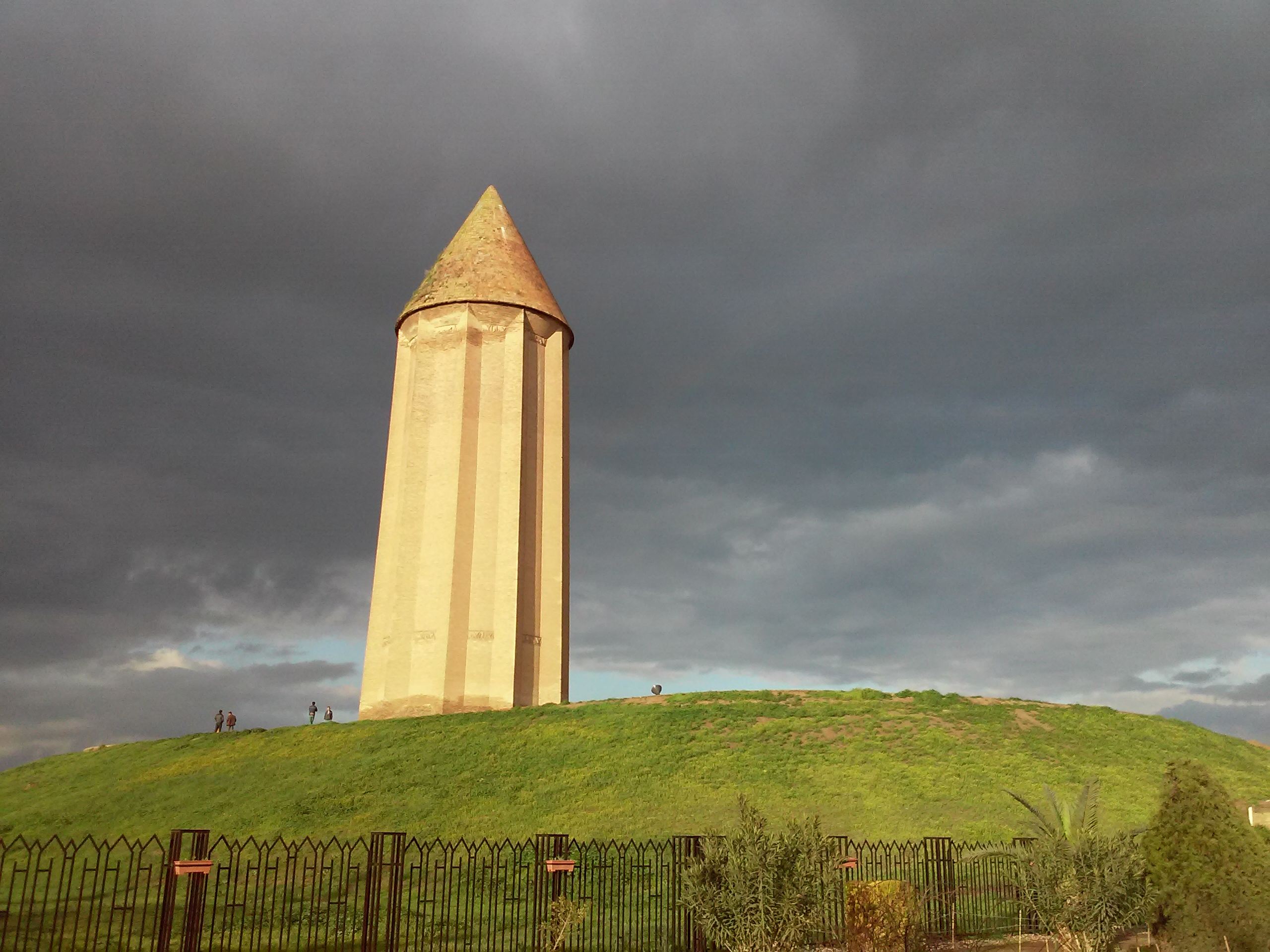
Gonbad-e Qabus in February 2015.

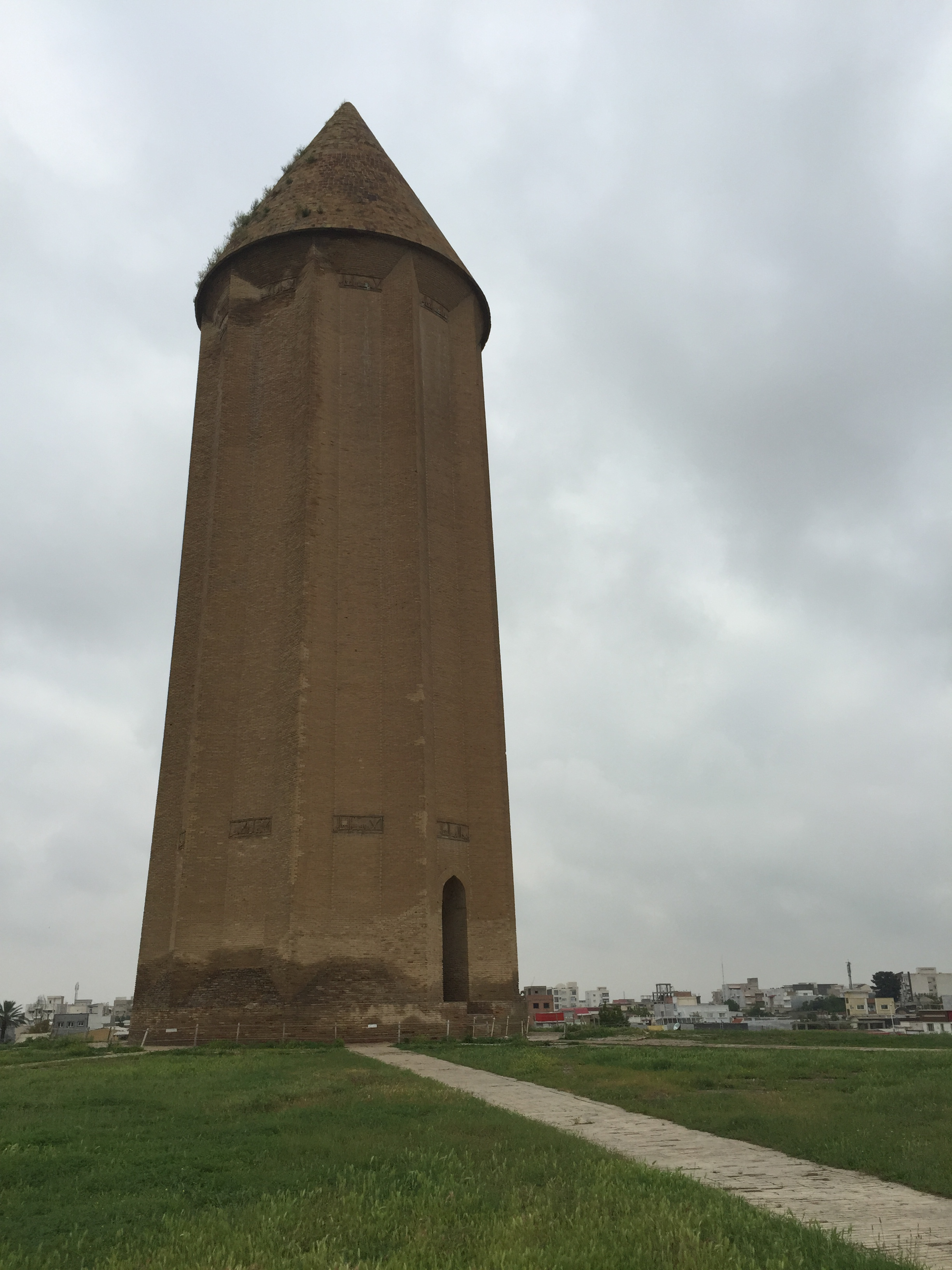
Gonbad-e Qabus in May 2016.

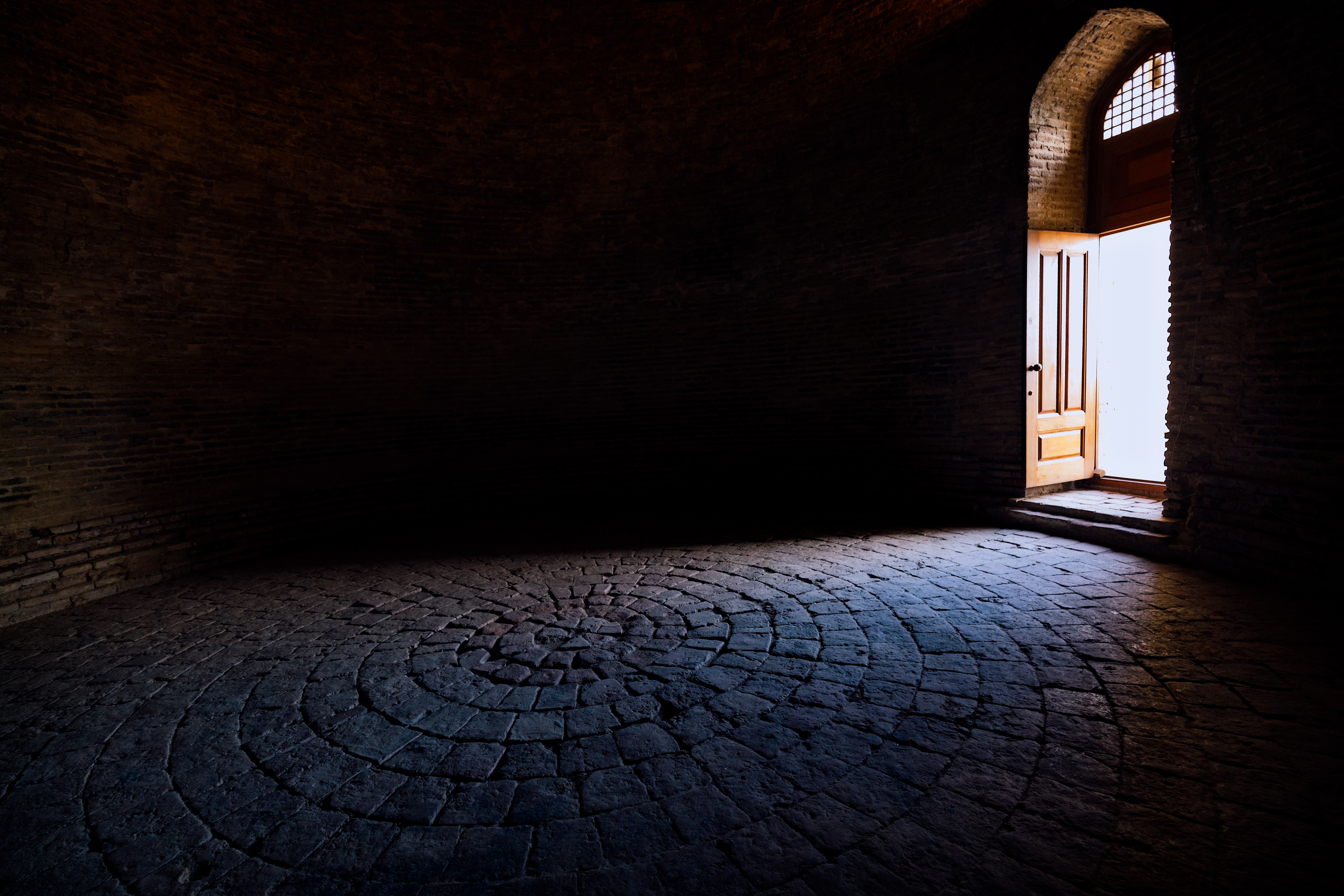
Interior of Gonbad-e Qabus.

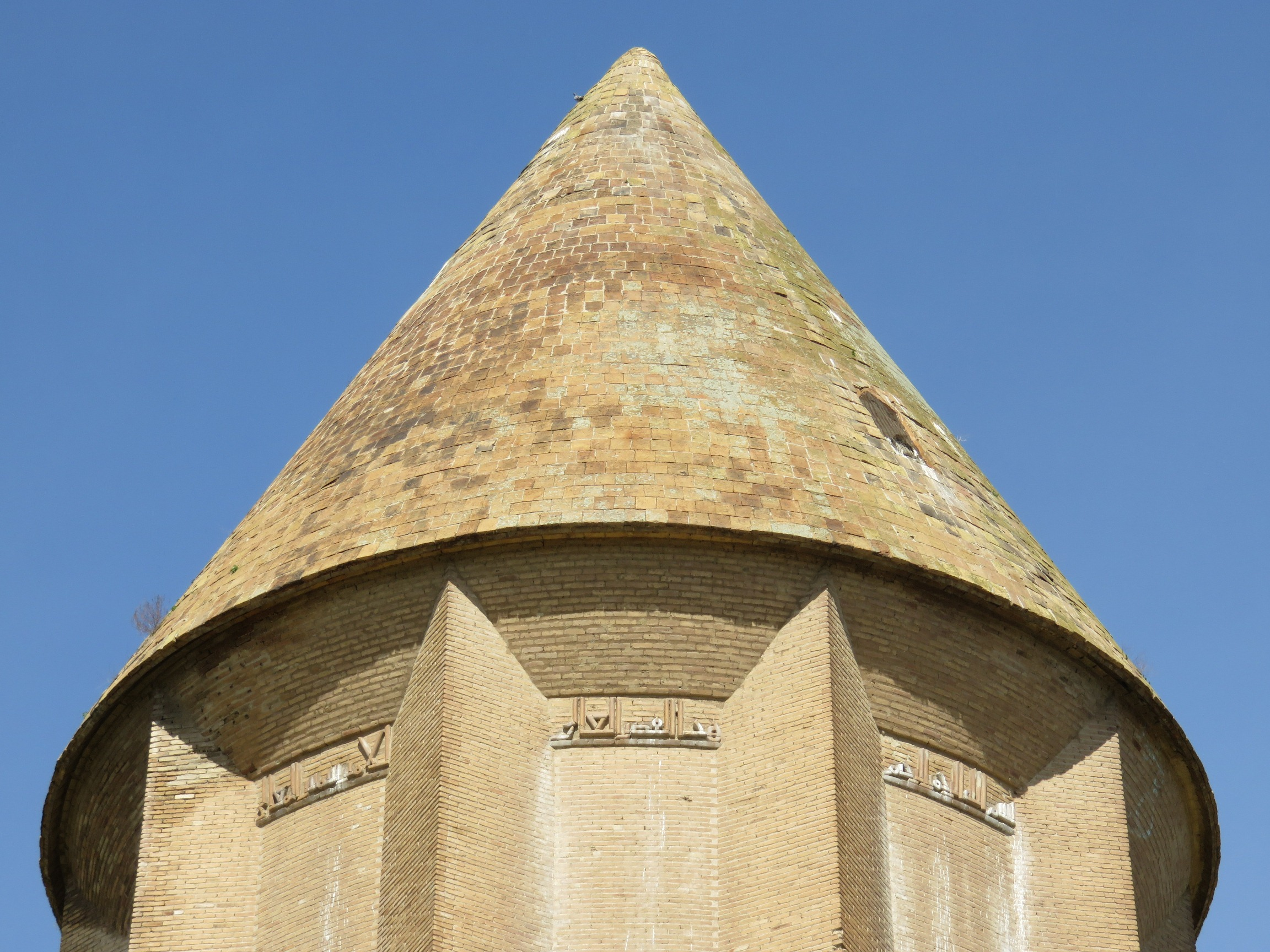
The conical roof of Gonbad-e Qabus.

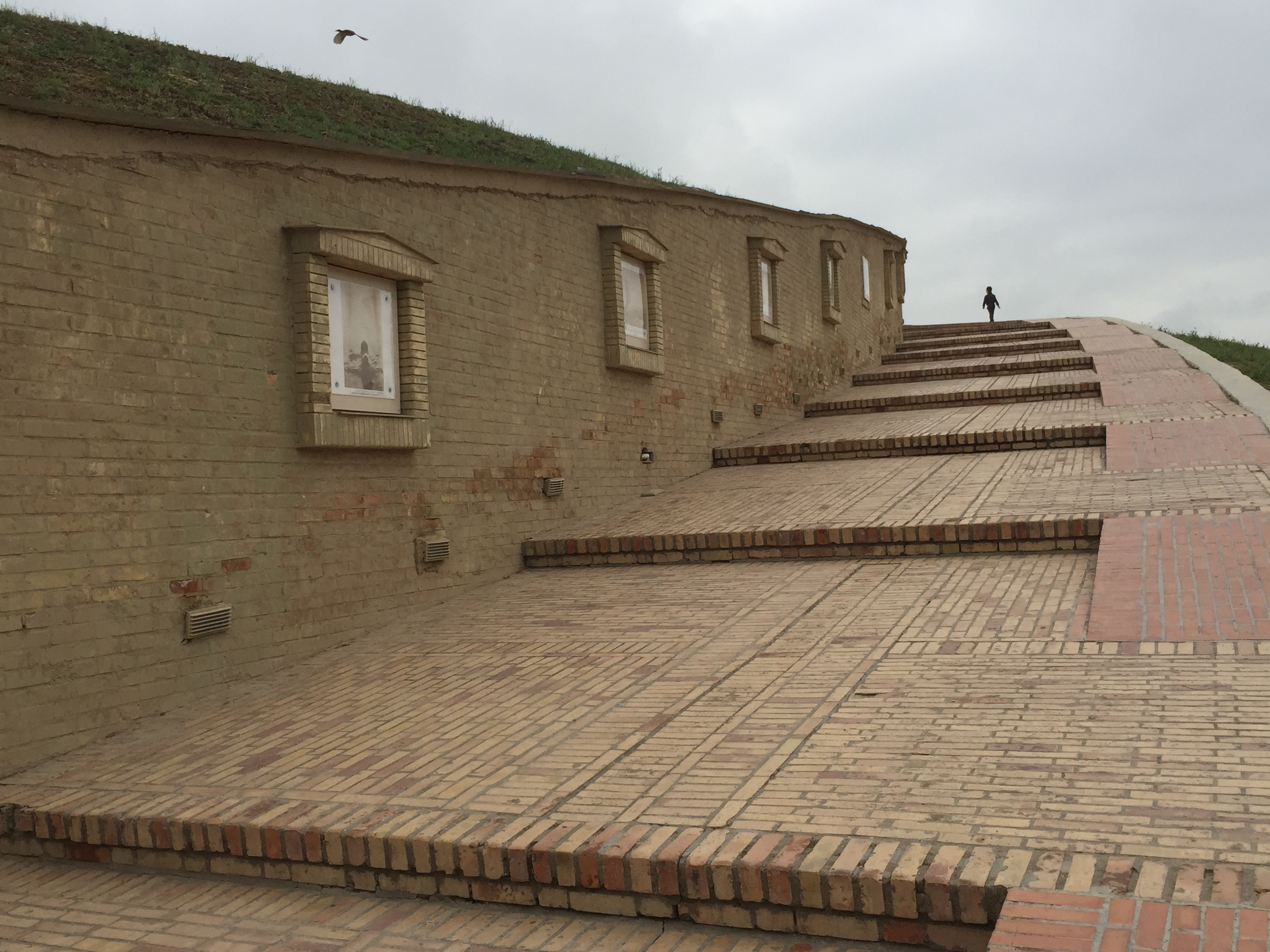
The stairway of Gonbad-e Qabus.

== See also ==
- Aliabad Tower
- Gonbad-e Sorkh, Maragheh
- List of tallest structures built before the 20th century

== Sources ==
- Blair, Sheila S. (2002). "GONBAD-E QĀBUS iii. MONUMENT". In Yarshater, Ehsan (ed.). Encyclopædia Iranica. Vol. XI/2: Golšani–Great Britain IV. London and New York: Routledge & Kegan Paul. pp. 126–129. ISBN 978-0-933273-62-7.
- Bosworth, C. Edmund (2010). "ZIYARIDS". In Yarshater, Ehsan (ed.). Encyclopædia Iranica (Online ed.). Encyclopædia Iranica Foundation.
- Grabar, Oleg (1975). "The Visual Arts". In Frye, R. N. (ed.). The Cambridge History of Iran, Vol. 4: From the Arab Invasion to the Saljuqs. Cambridge University Press. ISBN 978-0521200936.
- Hejazi, Mehrdad; Saradj, Fatemeh Mehdizadeh (2014). Persian Architectural Heritage: Architecture. WIT Press. ISBN 978-1845644123.
- Michailidis, Melanie (2009). "Empty Graves: The Tomb Towers of Northern Iran". In Gacek, Tomasz; Pstrusińska, Jadwiga (eds.). Proceedings of the Ninth Conference of the European Society for Central Asian Studies. Cambridge Scholars Publishing. ISBN 978-1443815024.
- Michailidis, Melanie (2015). "In the Footsteps of the Sasanians: Funerary Architecture and Bavandid Legitimacy". In Babaie, Sussan; Grigor, Talinn (eds.). Persian Kingship and Architecture: Strategies of Power in Iran from the Achaemenids to the Pahlavis. I.B.Tauris. ISBN 978-0857734778.
