= Asfar ibn Shiruya =

Asfar ibn Shiruya (Gilaki/Persian: اسفار بن شیرویه: died 931) was an Iranian military leader of Gilaki origin, active in northern Iran (esp. Tabaristan and Jibal) in the early 10th century. He played a major role in the succession disputes of the Alids of Tabaristan, and managed to establish himself as the ruler of Tabaristan and northern Jibal briefly from 928 to 930.

== Name ==
Asfār is a local Caspian form of Middle Persian aswār, which means "rider, cavalryman". The New Persian form of the word is savār.

== Biography ==
=== Background and early life ===
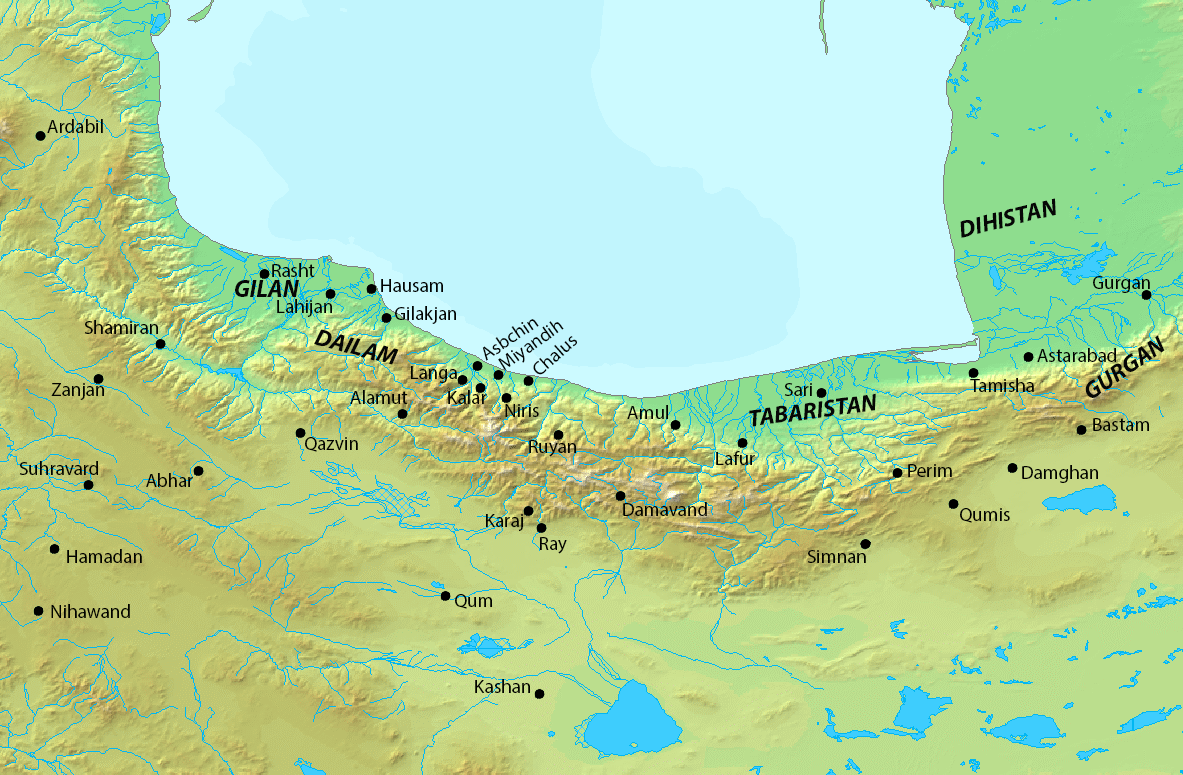
Map of northern Iran

A native of Lahijan, Asfar belonged to the Gilaki clan of Varudavand, and was the son of a certain Shiruya (Sheroe). Asfar had a brother named Shirzad, and grew up in an environment where "Iranian culture, memories of the glories of the Iranian Empire, were alive among them." Like many other Gilakis and Daylamites, Asfar was not a Muslim—he was in fact a nationalist, who loathed Arab rule and admired the Iranian Empire. According to the 10th-century Arab historian al-Masudi, most of the Daylamite and Gilaki leaders, who were adherents of Zoroastrian and Iranian paganism, had become atheists. Asfar was one of the many Gilaki leaders that entered into the service of the Alids, after establishing their rule over Tabaristan, Gilan, and Daylam.

=== Rise to power ===
Asfar is first mentioned in 917, during the succession disputes for control in Tabaristan after the death of the Alid ruler Hasan al-Utrush (r. 914–917). Eventually, Hasan ibn Qasam (called al-da'i al-saghir, "the lesser missionary") managed to emerge victorious. It was around this period, that the Samanid Empire was seeking to expand their power from Transoxiana and Khorasan into northern Iran, opposing Zaydi Shia Islam there whilst advocating the Sunni movement against it.

=== Reign and downfall ===
Asfar now expanded his domains over Ray, Qazvin and other parts of Jibal, initially apparently as a delegate of the Samanids, but thereafter as a sovereign ruler, assuming the emblem of kingship at Ray in disregard of Nasr II and the Abbasid caliph, al-Muqtadir (r. 908–932). He reportedly killed a great number of the citizens of Qazvin, burned the markets, demolished mosques and killed the muezzin, and prohibited the salah. Furthermore, he enforced a poll-tax on the whole population of the city, along with traders visiting from other countries, thus acquiring a vast sum. He also appointed his lieutenant and compatriot Mardavij as the governor of Zanjan.

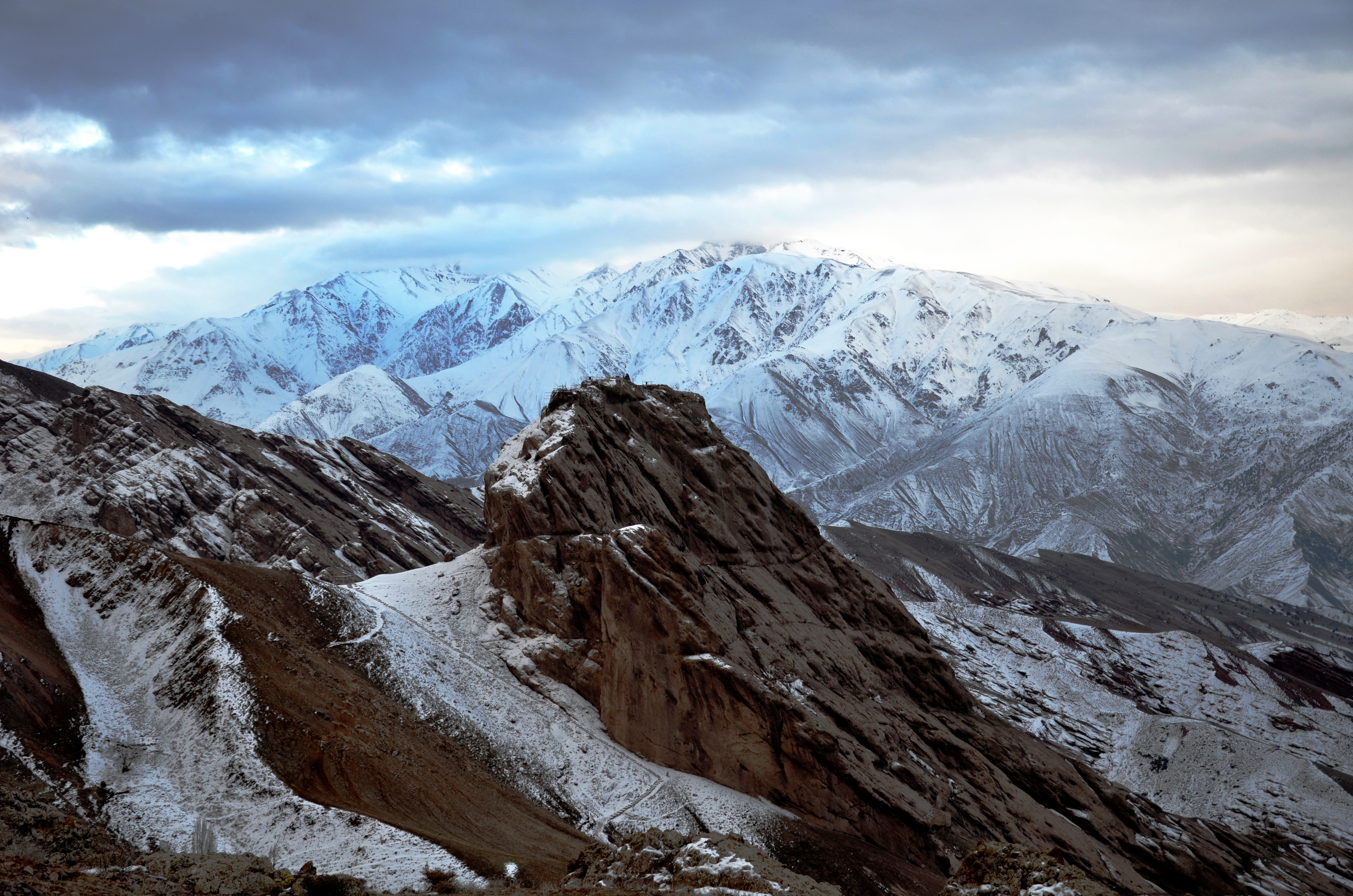
View of the Alamut Castle, where Asfar had left his vast treasure.

In 930, Mardavij along with Asfar's brother, Shirzad, were ordered to capture Tarom, the capital of the Sallarid ruler Muhammad ibn Musafir. During the siege, Mardavij, on the urging of Makan and Muhammad, betrayed Asfar by revolting against him. With the aid of Muhammad and Makan, Mardavij defeated and killed Shirzad, including other members of the Varudavand clan. He then marched towards Qazvin, the residence of Asfar. However, Asfar managed to flee. Mardavij thus founded the Ziyarid dynasty, and became ruler of Asfar's former territories.

Asfar was chased into Khorasan, being left no choice but to leave the treasure which he had assembled in the castle of Alamut in Daylam. When Asfar arrived at Bayhaq, however, he went back, aiming to recover his treasure at Alamut. But when he entered Talaqan, a town in Daylam near Qazvin, he was overwhelmed and killed by Mardavij, most likely in 931.

== Notes ==
b: Also spelled Wardad Awendan and Vardad-Avandan.

== Sources ==
- Bosworth, C. E. (1987). "ASFĀR B. ŠĪRŪYA". ASFĀR B. ŠĪRŪYA – Encyclopaedia Iranica. Encyclopaedia Iranica, Vol. II, Fasc. 7. pp. 747–748.
- Madelung, W. (1969). "The Assumption of the Title Shāhānshāh by the Būyids and "The Reign of the Daylam (Dawlat Al-Daylam)"". Journal of Near Eastern Studies. 28 (2): 84–108. doi:10.1086/371995. ISBN 978-0857731814. JSTOR 543315. S2CID 159540778.
- Madelung, W. (1975). "The Minor Dynasties of Northern Iran". In Frye, R.N. (ed.). The Cambridge History of Iran, Volume 4: From the Arab Invasion to the Saljuqs. Cambridge: Cambridge University Press. pp. 198–249. ISBN 978-0-521-20093-6.
- Pellat, Ch; Cahen, Cl (2012). "Ibn ʿAbbād". The Encyclopedia of Islam, Second Edition. BRILL. doi:10.1163/1573-3912_islam_SIM_3024. ISBN 9789004161214.

Preceded by Abbasid Caliphate (northern Jibal); Alids (Tabaristan)	Ruler of Tabaristan and northern Jibal; 928–930	Succeeded by Mardavij
