= Mardavij =

Ziyarid emir from 930 to 935

Mardavij مرداویج
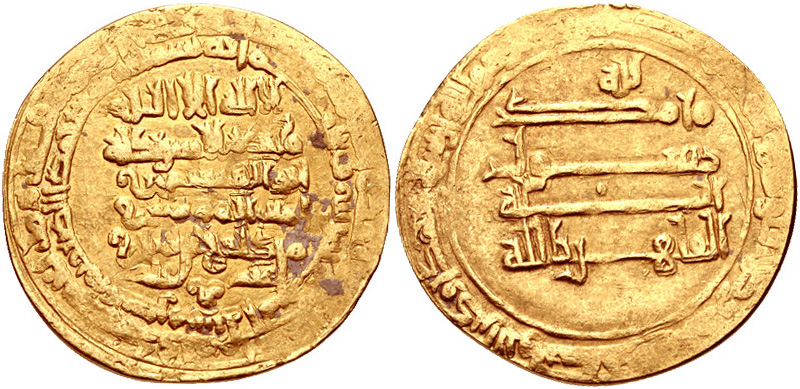
- Gold dinar of Mardavij, minted at Nahavand in 933/4

Emir of Tabaristan
- Reign: 930 – January 935
- Predecessor: Makan ibn Kaki
- Successor: Vushmgir
- Born: c. 890; Gilan
- Died: January 935; Isfahan
- Dynasty: Ziyarid
- Father: Ziyar
- Mother: Sister of Harusindan
- Religion: Zoroastrianism

Mardavij (Gilaki/Persian: مرداویج, meaning "man assailant"), also known as Mardavij the Great, was an Iranian prince, who established the Ziyarid dynasty, ruling from 930 to 935.

Born to a Zoroastrian family native to Gilan, Mardavij sought to establish a native Iranian Zoroastrian empire akin to the Sasanian Empire that had been conquered in the 7th century by the Rashidun Caliphate and subsequently ruled by Muslims. He first started his career by joining the army of his kinsman Asfar ibn Shiruya. Mardavij, however, later betrayed and killed him, conquering much of Jibal. He then set out to conquer Hamadan, Dinavar and Isfahan from the Abbasid Caliphate, and thereafter declared himself king of Iran, making Isfahan his capital.

He then defeated the Daylamite military leader Makan ibn Kaki, and conquered Tabaristan in 932. By 934, his authority was acknowledged as far as Shiraz and Ahvaz. However, his goal of recreating the Iranian Empire was ruined when he was murdered by his own Turkic slaves in 935.

== Background ==
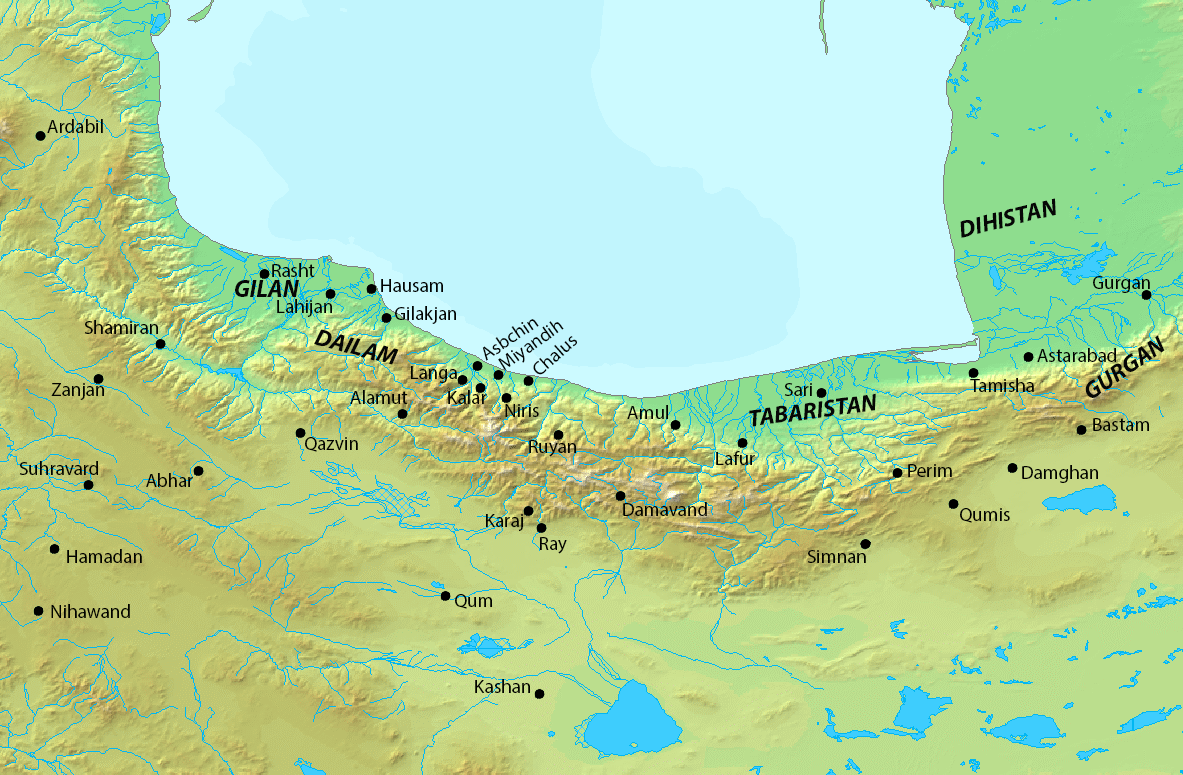
Map of northern Iran

Mardavij was born ca. 890 in Gilan; he was the son of Ziyar, who belonged to the Shahanshahvand, a royal clan that roamed around Dakhel. Mardavij's mother was a sister of Harusindan, a Gilaki ruler. Mardavij belonged to the Arghich tribe, which claimed to be descended from Arghush Farhadan, king of Gilan who lived during the time of Kay Khosrow. Mardavij grew up in an environment where memories of the glories of the Iranian Empire were alive in the Iranian culture. According to the 10th-century Arab historian al-Masudi, most of the Daylamite and Gilaki leaders, who were Zoroastrian and pagan, had become atheists. Mardavij was one of the many Gilaki leaders that entered into the service of the Alids, once they had established their rule over Tabaristan, Gilan, and Daylam.

== Rise to power ==
Around 913, Mardavij joined the army of Asfar ibn Shiruya of Lahijan, who served the Zaydids of Tabaristan. In 930, Asfar invaded the domains of the Zaydi Abu Muhammad Hasan ibn Qasim. During the invasion, Mardavij managed to heavily wound Abu Muhammad near Amol, thus avenging his maternal uncle Harusindan, who was killed by the hands of the Alids. The army of Asfar then marched towards Ray, where they defeated the Daylamite general Makan ibn Kaki, who fled to Daylam. Asfar managed to successfully conquer Tabaristan, and also captured Qazvin and Zanjan. He then appointed Mardavij as the governor of Zanjan. In 930, Mardavij, along with Asfar's brother, Shirzad, were ordered to capture Tarom, the capital of the Sallarid ruler Muhammad bin Musafir. During the siege, Mardavij, on the urging of Makan and Muhammad, betrayed Asfar by revolting against him. With the aid of Muhammad and Makan, Mardavij defeated and killed Shirzad, along with other members of his tribe. He then marched towards Qazvin, the residence of Asfar, but Asfar managed to flee. Mardavij thus founded the Ziyarid dynasty and became ruler of Asfar's former territories, which included Ray, Qazvin, Zanjan, Abhar, Qom and Karaj. He is said to have worn a "crown of Anushirvan" at his court.

== Reign ==
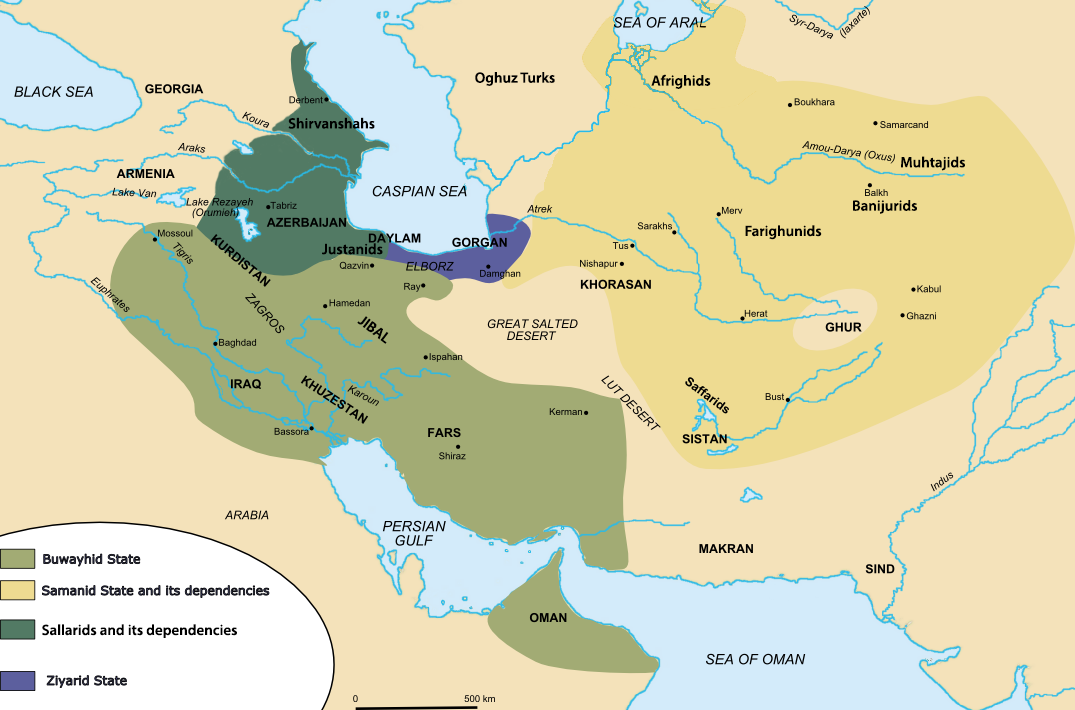
Iran in the mid-10th century

In the same year, Makan managed to defeat Mardavij, and briefly recover Tabaristan. Makan then extended his rule over most of Gurgan and even took possession of Nishapur in western Khurasan, which he was forced to abandon in 931, bowing to pressure by the Samanid ruler Nasr II. In 931, Mardavij sent an army against Makan, but the latter defeated Mardavij's forces in a first engagement in 931. Eventually, after Makan's return to Tabaristan from Nishapur, Mardavij personally launched an attack that conquered Tabaristan.

Mardavij then aggressively began expanding his domains, by attacking Asfar, who was now residing in Hamadan after his disastrous defeat. In 931, Mardavij managed to defeat and kill Asfar. He then began quickly capturing the Abbasid cities of Hamadan, Dinavar, and Kashan, and finally, Isfahan, which became his capital. He then appointed his brother Vushmgir as the governor of Amol. Mardavij planned to conquer Baghdad, remove the caliphate, be crowned in Ctesiphon and restore the Iranian empire.

Just after Mardavij's victory, Ali ibn Buya, along with his two brothers Hasan ibn Buya and Ahmad ibn Buya, defected to Mardavij's side just as he was preparing to campaign to the south of the Alborz mountains as far as Qazvin. Not long afterwards Mardavij granted Ali administrative rule over Karaj, a strategically important town probably situated near modern Bahramabad. While making a stop in Ray on his way to Karaj, however, Ali was warned by Mardavij's vizier al-'Amid that Mardavij was planning to eliminate him. Hurriedly leaving Ray, he arrived at and took over Karaj. In 933, Mardavij made peace with the Samanid ruler Nasr II; Mardavij agreed to cede Gurgan to the Samanids and pay tribute for his possession of Ray. Mardavij then began to focus on western Iran, where his troops managed to conquer as far as Ahvaz, and forced Ali, who was now in Shiraz, to once again acknowledge his authority. Mardavij then had a golden throne with jewels, a tunic, and a golden crown made. His crown was reportedly the same shape of the crown of the Sasanian king Khosrow I. He also had a few silver thrones made for his best generals.

== Death ==
In January 935, shortly before Nowruz festivities, Mardavij was assassinated by his Turkic slaves, whom he had treated badly, while favoring his Daylamite/Gilaki troops. After his assassination, many of his troops entered the service of the Abbasids, while some others joined Ali, who founded the Buyid dynasty, and had taken over Mardavij possessions in central and southern Iran. Mardavij's brother Vushmgir succeeded him in northern Iran. Mardavij was buried in Gonbad-e Mardaviz, a place located in the north east of Amin Abbad Borough in the city of Rey, south of Tehran.

== Legacy ==
Mardavij was one of the most notable figures in northern Iran known for preserving and advocating pre-Islamic Iranian customs. During the Pahlavi era, where interest in pre-Islamic Iran was high, Mardavij appeared as the hero in stories and comic strips of children's magazines in the 1960s.

== Sources ==
- Madelung, W. (1975). "The Minor Dynasties of Northern Iran". In Frye, Richard N. (ed.). The Cambridge History of Iran: From the Arab Invasion to the Saljuqs. Vol. 4. Cambridge: Cambridge University Press. pp. 198–249. ISBN 0-521-20093-8.
- Bosworth, C. E. (2010). "ZIYARIDS". Encyclopaedia Iranica, Online Edition.
- Nazim, M. (1987). "Mākān b. Kākī". In Houtsma, Martijn Theodoor (ed.). E.J. Brill's first encyclopaedia of Islam, 1913–1936, Volume V: L–Moriscos. Leiden: BRILL. pp. 164–165. ISBN 90-04-08265-4.
- Busse, Heribert (1975). "Iran under the Būyids". In Frye, Richard N. (ed.). The Cambridge History of Iran: From the Arab Invasion to the Saljuqs. Vol. 4. Cambridge: Cambridge University Press. pp. 250–304. ISBN 0-521-20093-8.
- Madelung, W. "GĪLĀN iv. History in the Early Islamic Period". Encyclopaedia Iranica, Online Edition.
- Madelung, W. (1969). The Assumption of the Title Shāhānshāh by the Būyids and "The Reign of the Daylam (Dawlat Al-Daylam)". Vol. 28. Journal of Near Eastern Studies, vol. 28, no. 2. pp. 84–108. doi:10.1086/371995. ISBN 0857731815. JSTOR 543315. S2CID 159540778.
- Bromberger, Christian (2011). "GILĀN xv. Popular and Literary Perceptions of Identity". Encyclopaedia Iranica.

Preceded by None	Ziyarid king 930–935	Succeeded by Vushmgir
