= Manuchihr =

Ziyarid emir from 1012 to 1031

- Emir of the Ziyarid dynasty
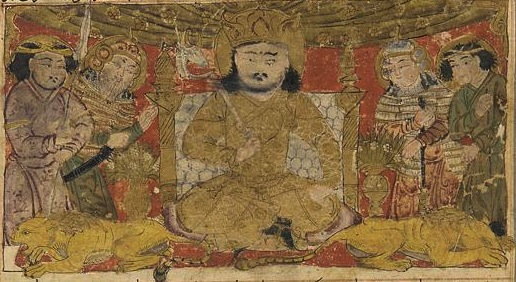

Emir of Tabaristan
- Reign: 1012–1031
- Predecessor: Qabus
- Successor: Anushirvan Sharaf al-Ma'ali
- Died: 1031; Gorgan
- Issue: Anushirvan Sharaf al-Ma'ali
- House: Ziyarid
- Father: Qabus
- Religion: Sunni Islam

Falak al-Ma'ali Manuchihr (Persian: فلک‌المعالی منوچهر), better known as Manuchihr (died c. 1031), was the ruler of the Ziyarids (1012 at the latest – c. 1031). He was the son of Qabus.

== Early life ==
During his father's reign Manuchihr was appointed as governor of Tabaristan. When, in the early part of the 11th century, a group of army conspirators rebelled against Qabus and took control of the capital Gurgan, invited Manuchihr to take the throne. Due to his fear that he might lose the succession, he agreed and pursued Qabus to Bastam. His father eventually agreed to step down in favor of his son and retired to a castle, but was eventually killed in 1012.

== Reign ==
Manuchihr was granted the title of Falak al-Ma'ali upon his ascension by the Abbasid caliph al-Qadir. Shortly after this, Manuchihr recognized the sovereignty of the Mahmud of Ghazna, and married one of his daughters. He did so in order to prevent the Ghaznavids from attempting to install his brother Dara, who had fled to the Ghaznavid court, on the throne. Manuchihr sent tribute and Dailamite troop detachments for Mahmud's invasion of India.

Ibn Fuladh, a Dailamite military officer, who claimed Qazvin for himself, revolted against his Buyid overlord Majd al-Dawla in 1016. Majd al-Dawla, however, refused to make him governor of Qazvin, which made Ibn Fuladh threaten him around the countryside of his capital in Ray. Majd al-Dawla then requested the aid of his vassal, the Bavandid ruler Abu Ja'far Muhammad, who managed to defeat Ibn Fuladh and repel him from Ray. Ibn Fuladh then requested aid from Manuchihr. Ibn Fuladh agreed to become Manuchihr's vassal in return for his aid. The following year, a combined army of Ibn Fuladh and Manuchihr besieged Ray, which forced Majd al-Dawla to make Ibn Fuladh the governor of Isfahan. However, the Kakuyid ruler Muhammad ibn Rustam Dushmanziyar, who was a Buyid vassal king of Isfahan, defeated Ibn Fuladh, possibly killing him during the battle.

Manuchihr's relationship with the Ghaznavids was not always friendly, however; on his way to seize the possessions of Majd al-Dawla of Ray in 1028, Mahmud invaded the Ziyarid's territory. Manuchihr was forced to flee and only returned to his throne after paying a large sum to Mahmud.

Manuchihr died in around 1030 and was succeeded by his son Anushirvan, who also undertook a promise to pay tribute to the Ghaznavids.

== Sources ==
- E. Merçil (1989). Gazneliler Devleti Tarihi (History of Ghaznavids), Türk Tarih Kurumu, Ankara. ISBN 975-16-0189-4
- Bosworth, C. E. (1968). "The Political and Dynastic History of the Iranian World (A.D. 1000–1217)". In Boyle, John Andrew (ed.). The Cambridge History of Iran: The Saljuq and Mongol Periods. Vol. 5. Cambridge: Cambridge University Press. pp. 1–202. ISBN 0-521-06936-X.
- Bosworth, C. E. (1975). "The early Ghaznavids". In Frye, Richard N. (ed.). The Cambridge History of Iran: From the Arab Invasion to the Saljuqs. Vol. 4. Cambridge: Cambridge University Press. pp. 162–198. ISBN 0-521-20093-8.
- Bosworth, C. Edmund (1997). "EBN FŪLĀD". Encyclopaedia Iranica, Vol. VIII, Fasc. 1. London et al. pp. 26–27.
- Madelung, W. (1975). "The Minor Dynasties of Northern Iran". In Frye, Richard N. (ed.). The Cambridge History of Iran: From the Arab Invasion to the Saljuqs. Vol. 4. Cambridge: Cambridge University Press. pp. 198–249. ISBN 0-521-20093-8.

Preceded by Qabus	Ziyarid ruler c. 1012–1031	Succeeded by Anushirvan
