= Qabus-nama =

Major work of Persian literature (11th century AD)

Qabus Nama
- A page from the book Qabus Nama, manuscript from the Malek Museum.
- Author: Keikavus
- Original title: Nasihat Nama
- Language: Persian Dari
- Subject: Didactic literature
- Genre: Advice literature

Nasihat Nama (Persian: نصحیت نامه), also known as Qabus Nama (Persian: قابوس نامه), is an 11th-century Persian language book authored by Amir Keikavus. The book was completed in the year 475 AH. Qabus Nama is an advice book, and its contents are presented in the form of counsel and advice.

The author, Keikavus, was a prince of the Ziyarid dynasty. He wrote this book for his son, Gilanshah, in 44 chapters and one introduction; with the intention that if his son were to maintain the rule after him or take care of other affairs, he would know how to fulfill his duties. Keikavus also covered topics such as the upbringing of a child, the customs of military expeditions, governance, social etiquettes, and the common knowledge and skills of that era. Although the primary audience of the book is Gilanshah, Keikavus explained in the introduction that others could also benefit from this work, and he strived to make the book accessible to all.

Qabus Nama is one of the earliest advice books in Persian Dari and one of the most prominent ones. Five manuscript versions of Qabus Nama are known, which have differences in their compositions. This book has a simple text that is close to contemporary Standard Persian, and throughout the book, advice, proverbs, stories, and poems are interwoven. Although most of Qabus Nama is written in simple prose, there are also quatrains in the middle of the text, mostly by Keikavus himself. However, these poems are of lesser quality compared to his prose. The book uses Arabic sparingly, and the author only employs this language for technical and specific terms. There is only one verse in Arabic and one verse in the Tabari language in the book.

In contemporary times, various editions of Qabus Nama have been published in Iran. For the first time, Reza-Qoli Khan Hedayat published a lithographed version of it during the Qajar era. Subsequently, editions with corrections and introductions by Saeed Nafisi and Gholamhossein Yousefi were also published. Qabus Nama has been translated into various languages. The earliest translations were into Turkic languages, including Ottoman Turkish and Tatar, and later translations were published in German, French, English, Italian, Russian, Arabic, Japanese, Georgian, Uzbek, and Azerbaijani.

The prose style of Qabus Nama influenced Persian literature after its time and led to more complex literary texts. Additionally, the storytelling style and the inclusion of short poems within the prose impacted writers such as Saadi. The translations of this book into Turkic languages gave rise to a style in Ottoman Turkish literature known as Nasihatnama. The German poet Johann Wolfgang von Goethe was also influenced by this book in his work West–östlicher Divan.

== Background ==
Qabus Nama is a book in the category of educational literature. Such books have a long history in Persian literature, and a large portion of literary books were written for education and training. Writing Pahlavi advice books was a common tradition in ancient Iran before Islam. Although the original Pahlavi advice books mostly disappeared gradually before the advent of Islam, their contents were translated into Arabic in the first three centuries after Hijra. Additionally, Sasanian Pahlavi language continued to be used up to the fourth and fifth centuries after Hijra, and the tradition of writing advice books was thus passed on to later generations. By the fifth century after Hijra, advice books had found their way into Persian works. However, the moral teachings rooted in ancient times underwent changes according to the requirements of Islam. Nevertheless, references to Sasanian customs, which are present in Qabus Nama and other early works, are derived from these Pahlavi regulations. Persian prose in the fifth century, contemporary with the Ghaznavids, also witnessed gradual changes. Its Simple Prose lost its excessive simplicity, and sentences became longer and more elaborate. The works of this period are referred to as transitional or formative literature.

== Extant original copies ==
- The oldest copy, dated 1349, belongs to the library of Malek National Museum and Library in Tehran.
- The Egyptian National Library and Archives keeps a copy in Old Anatolian Turkish, written during the reign of Süleyman of Germiyan.
- One of the earliest remaining copies of this work is one dating from 1450, translated into Turkish by Mercimek Ahmed on the orders of the Ottoman Sultan Murad II. It is kept in the Fatih Library of Istanbul.
- The British Museum keeps a copy of an early Turkish translation, dated 1456.
- Another copy, dated 1474, exists in the Bibliothèque nationale de France in Paris (ms. Persan 138).
- An excellent copy is kept at the Leiden University library.

The Turkish version was then translated into German by Heinrich Friedrich von Diez as Buch des Kabus in 1811, and a source of inspiration for Goethe's West-östlicher Diwan as he was in contact with von Diez.

The text was translated directly from Persian into English by Reuben Levy with the title: A Mirror for Princes in 1951. French, Japanese, Russian, Arabic, and Georgian (1978) language translations also followed.

== Cultural references ==
This work is mentioned several times in Louis L'Amour's The Walking Drum as well as in Tariq Ali's "The Stone Woman".

== See also ==
- Persian Literature
- Mirrors for princes
