= Arghush Farhadan =

King of Gilan

Arghush Farhadan (Middle Persian: Āghosh Vehādhān) was a legendary king of Gilan, who lived during the time of the Kayanian king of Iran, Kay Khosrow. He was one of the commanders of the latter during the war against the Turanian king Afrasiab, and along with Gostaham, invaded Khwarazm and defeated Afrasiab's brother, Garsivaz, and his son, Sheda.

The rulers of Gilan, including the Ziyarid king Mardavij, claimed to be descended from Arghush.

== Sources ==
- Madelung, W. (1975). "The Minor Dynasties of Northern Iran". In Frye, R.N. (ed.). The Cambridge History of Iran, Volume 4: From the Arab Invasion to the Saljuqs. Cambridge: Cambridge University Press. pp. 198–249. ISBN 978-0-521-20093-6.
- Tafazzoli, A. (1984). "Āḡoš Vehāḏān". Encyclopaedia Iranica, Vol. I, Fasc. 6. p. 611.
