= Ziyarid dynasty =

931–1090 Gilaki dynasty of northern Iran

Ziyarid dynasty زیاریان Ziyāriyān
- 931–1090
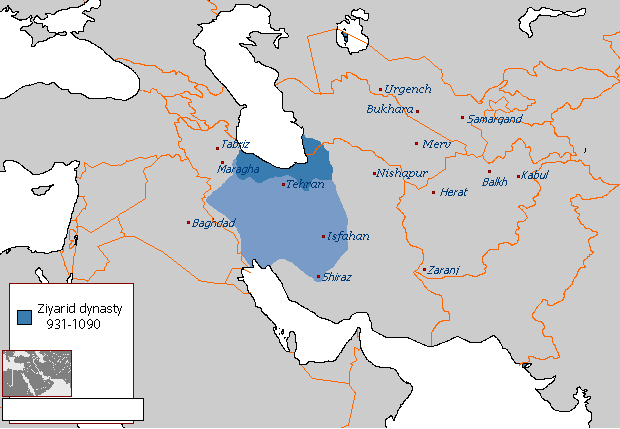
- Map of the Ziyarid dynasty, lighter blue shows their greatest extent for a small period of time.
- Capital: Isfahan (931–935); Ray (935–943); Gorgan (943–1035); Amol (1035–1090)
- Common languages: Persian; Gilaki; Tabari
- Religion: Sunni Islam
- Government: Monarchy
- King
  - 931–935: Mardavij (first)
  - 1087–1090: Gilanshah (last)
- Historical era: Middle Ages
  - Established: 931
  - Disestablished: 1090
Preceded by
Abbasid Caliphate
Samanid Empire
Alid dynasties of northern Iran
Succeeded by
Nizari Ismaili state
Buyid dynasty

The Ziyarid dynasty (Persian: زیاریان, romanized: Ziyāriyān) was an Iranian dynasty of Gilaki origin that ruled Tabaristan from 931 to 1090 during the Iranian Intermezzo period. The empire rose to prominence during the leadership of Mardavij. After his death, his brother Vushmgir and his Samanid allies led the dynasty in wrestling for control over territory against the Buyids in the early- to mid-10th century. When Vushmgir died, his sons Bisutun and Qabus fought for influence. Qabus would eventually outlive his brother and ruled the kingdom. However, Qabus was placed in exile from 980 to 998 by the Buyid ruler, Adud al-Dawla who would then dominate Tabaristan, the heartland of Ziyarid power. A succession of other rulers came to rule the kingdom with Ghaznavid support in the early 11th century. The Nizari Ismaili state invaded and ended Ziyarid rule in 1090.

At its greatest extent, it ruled much of present-day western and northern Iran. During the turn of the century, the kingdom attracted many scholars, with the most notable being al-Biruni.

== Origins ==
The dynasty was descended from Vardanshah, leader of the Shahanshahvand tribe, which traced its descent back to the legendary king Arghush Farhadan, who was the ruler of Gilan, and lived during the time of Kai Khosrow. Vardanshah had a son named Ziyar, who married a sister of the Gilaki king Harusindan, who bore him a son named Mardavij. Mardavij later served another Gilaki military leader named Asfar ibn Shiruya, but later betrayed the latter and conquered Tabaristan, which led to the foundation of the Ziyarid dynasty, which he named after his father.

== History ==
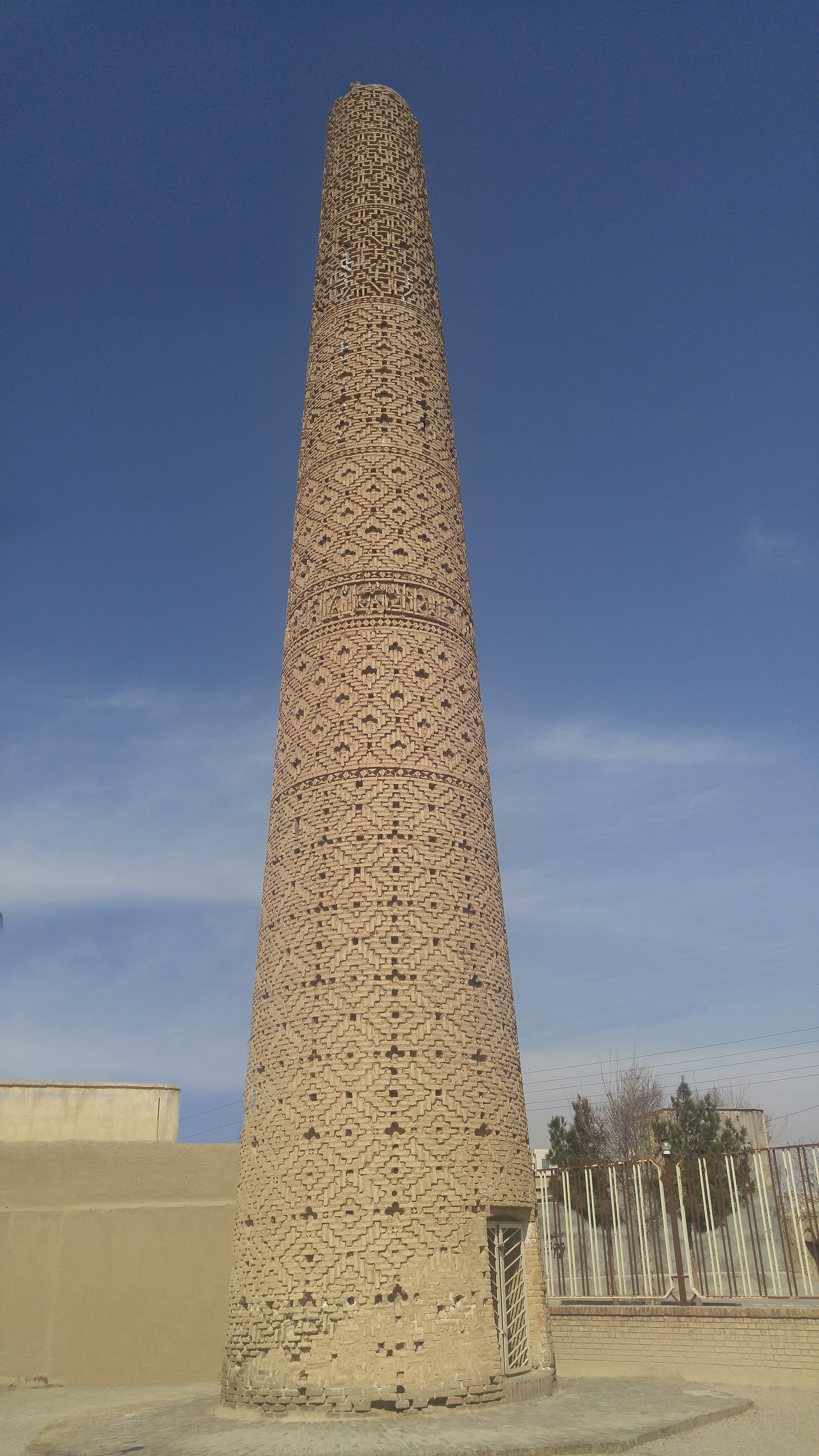
Minaret of the Tarik Khane mosque, Damghan, Ziyarid dynasty, 1026‒1032.

Mardavij then began aggressively expanding his territories, killing Asfar and capturing several important cities in Iran, such as Hamadan, Dinavar, Kashan, Isfahan, Shiraz and Ahvaz from the Abbasids. He further planned to restore the Sasanian Empire through conquering Baghdad and ousting the Abbasid Caliphate, but was instead murdered in 935. After Mardavij's death, his brother and general Vushmgir was crowned as the new Ziyarid ruler in Ray.

Hasan ibn Buya, one of the brothers of the Buyid ruler Ali ibn Buya, took advantage of Mardavij's death by seizing Isfahan from Ziyarid rule. The Samanids also took advantage of the opportunity, but were defeated by Vushmgir, who then wrested Gorgan from Samanid control.

=== Reign of Vushmgir 930s–960s ===
However, Vushmgir soon decided to acknowledge Samanid supremacy, and in 936 he also turned over Gorgan to Makan. Turning against Hasan, he retook Isfahan in 938. In 939 or 940 the Samanid governor Abu 'Ali Chaghani attacked Gorgan; Vushmgir sent Makan aid, but the city fell after a long siege. Abu 'Ali Chaghani then engaged Vushmgir in battle in Ray and defeated him, killing Makan in the process. Vushmgir fled to Tabaristan, but was faced there with a revolt by his governor of Sari, al-Hasan ibn al-Fairuzan, who was a cousin of Makan and blamed the Ziyarid for his death. Vushmgir defeated him, but al-Hasan convinced Abu 'Ali Chaghani to invade Tabaristan. Vushmgir was forced to recognize Samanid authority again. Hasan furthered the Ziyarid's troubles by retaking Isfahan in 940.

When Abu 'Ali Chaghani left for Samanid-held Khurasan, Vushmgir retook control of Ray. He then lost it for good in 943, to the Buyid Hasan. Returning to Tabaristan, he was defeated there by al-Hasan, who had previously occupied Gorgan. Vushmgir fled to the Bavandids of the mountains in eastern Tabaristan, then to the court of the Samanid Nuh I. Al-Hasan meanwhile allied with Hasan, but when Ibn Muthaj took Ray from the Buyids in 945, he recognized Samanid authority. Still, in 945 Vushmgir captured Gorgan with Samanid support, but did not manage to retain his rule there. It was only in 947 when he was able to take Gorgan and Tabaristan from al-Hasan with the help of a large Samanid army.

In 948 Hasan (who since the Buyids' entrance into Baghdad in 945 had used the title Rukn al-Dawla) invaded Tabaristan and Gorgan and took them from Vushmgir. While al-Hasan supported the Buyids, Vushmgir relied on his Samanid allies. Tabaristan and Gorgan changed hands several times until 955, when in a treaty with the Samanids, Rukn al-Daula promised to leave Vushmgir alone in Tabaristan. Peace between the two sides did not last long, however since in 958 Vushmgir briefly occupied Ray, which was Rukn al-Dawla's capital. Rukn al-Dawla later made a counter-attack, temporarily taking Gorgan in 960, then taking both Tabaristan and Gorgan for a short time in 962. He may have also taken Tabaristan and Gorgan in 966, but did not hold on to them for long.

=== Reign of Qabus 970s–990s ===
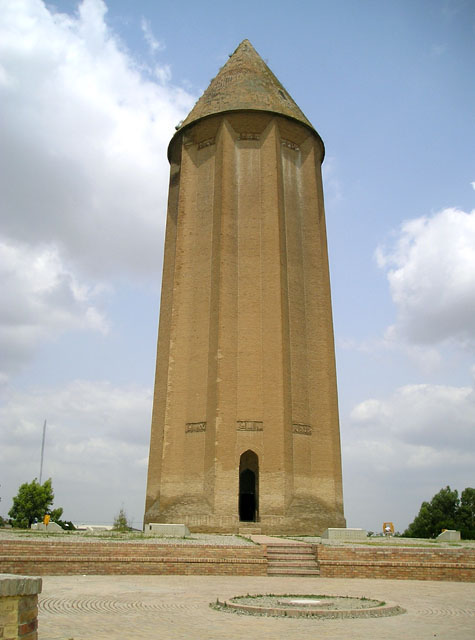
Gonbad-e Qabus

Vushmgir was killed by a boar during a hunt in 967, shortly after a Samanid army had arrived for a joint campaign against the Buyids. He was succeeded by his eldest son Bisutun. However, the Samanid army favored another son, Qabus, and challenged Bisutun's rule. Bisutun then agreed with Rukn al-Dawla to become his vassal in return for protection against the Samanids, which forced the Samanid army to withdraw to Khorasan. In 971, the Abbasid caliph al-Muti gave Bisutun the title of Zahir al-Dawla. Bisutun later died in 977, and was succeeded by Qabus. However, he was expelled by the Buyid ruler Adud al-Dawla in 980, because he gave refuge to the latter's rival and brother Fakhr al-Dawla. The Buyids now dominated Tabaristan over 17 years while Qabus was in exile in Khorasan. In 998, Qabus returned to Tabaristan and re-established his authority there. He then established good relations with the Ghaznavid ruler Mahmud of Ghazni who had taken control of Khorasan, but still acted as an independent sovereign. During the reign of Qabus, his kingdom was a major attraction to scholars; Abu Rayhan Biruni, the great scientist of the Middle Ages, was supported by Qabus. In fact he dedicated his work Chronology to Qabus around 1000 and observed eclipses of the moon in his capital of Gorgan.

=== Later rulers and decline 1000s–1090 ===
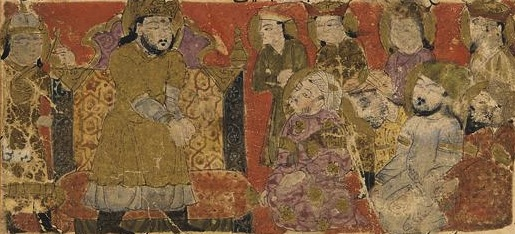
Manuchihr addresses his assembled people and army. Folio from a Tarikhnama (Book of history) by Balami, early 14th century.

Due to his tyrannical rule, Qabus was overthrown by his own army in 1012, and was succeeded by his son Manuchihr, who quickly recognized the sovereignty of Mahmud of Ghazni, and married one of his daughters. Manuchihr died in 1031, and was succeeded by his son Anushirvan Sharaf al-Ma'ali whom Mahmud of Ghazni had chosen as the heir of the Ziyarid dynasty. From 1032 to 1040, the real power behind the throne was held by Abu Kalijar ibn Vayhan, a relative of Anushirvan. In 1035, Abu Kalijar stopped paying tribute to the Ghaznavids, which led to the Ghaznavids invading Tabaristan and sacked the Ziyarid capital of Amol. Abu Kalijar, after having learned the consequences of not paying tribute to the Ghaznavids, agreed to continue paying tribute. This gave Anushirvan the opportunity to imprison Abu Kalijar and gain a firm grip over his kingdom. In 1041/1042, the Seljuqs, now the new masters of Khorasan, invaded Anushirvan's domains, which forced him to accept their authority.

Anushirvan died in 1059 and was succeeded by his cousin Keikavus, the celebrated author of the Qabus nama, a major work of Persian literature. Keikavus died in 1087, and was succeeded by his son Gilanshah. His reign was however short and in 1090, the Nizari Ismaili state under Hassan-i Sabbah invaded and conquered his domains, which ended Ziyarid rule in Tabaristan.

== Art and architecture ==
One of the most famous architectural works of the Ziyarid dynasty is the Gonbad Kavous (meaning the "Dome of Qabus"). The tomb is one of the earliest architectural monuments with a dated inscription surviving in post-Islamic Iran. The tomb, built of fired brick, is an enormous cylinder capped by a conical roof. The circular plan, broken by 10 flanges, is 17 m in diameter, and the walls are 3 m thick. The height from base to tip is 49 m. Legend has it, that the body of Qabus was enclosed in a glass coffin which was suspended by chains from the interior dome inside the tower.

== Culture ==
Qabus, a prominent writer of Arabic, patronized Kamalu'd-din Bundar of Ray, Abu'l-Qasim Ziyad b. Muhammad al-Qamari al-Jurjani, and Abu-Bakr Muhammad b. 'Ali al-Khusravi. Kamalu'd-din Bundar wrote his poetry in Arabic, Persian and Gilaki. The poet Manuchihri would take his penname from his first patron, Falak al-Ma'ali Manuchihr, son of Qabus. By the reign of Keikavus however, the Ziyard court was Persianate, with Keikavus writing the Persian literary work, Qabus-nama.

== Ziyarid rulers ==
Portrait	Title	Regnal name	Personal Name	Birth	Family relations	Reign	Death	Notes
Ziyarid dynasty (928–1043)
	Abolhajjaj, Emir	Mardavij		?	son of Ziyar	930-January 935	January 935	
	Abutaher	Voshmgir		?	son of Ziyar	935–967	967	
	Zahir od-Dowleh	Bisotoon		?	son of Voshmgir	967–977	977	
	Shams ol-Ma'ali, Abolhasan	Qabus		?	son of Voshmgir	(first) 977–981 (second) 997-1012	1012	
	Falak ol-Ma'ali	Manuchehr		?	son of Qabus	1012–1031	1031	
	Sharaf ol-Ma'ali	Anushiravan		?	son of Manuchehr	1030–1050	1050	
	Onsor ol-Ma'ali	Keikavus		?	son of Eskandar son of Qabus	1050-1087	1087	
		Gilanshah		?	son of Keykavous	1087-1090	1090	

== Family tree ==
Vardanshah
Ziyar
Mardavij; 930–935	Vushmgir; 935–967
Farhad	Bisutun; 967–977	Qabus; 977–1012	Salar	Langar
Manuchihr; 1012–1031	Dara	Iskandar
Anushirvan; 1030–1050	Keikavus; 1050–1087
Gilanshah; 1087–1090

== See also ==
- Bavand dynasty
- Dabuyid dynasty

== Sources ==
- Bosworth, C. E. (1968). "The Political and Dynastic History of the Iranian World (A.D. 1000–1217)". In Boyle, John Andrew (ed.). The Cambridge History of Iran: The Saljuq and Mongol Periods. Vol. 5. Cambridge: Cambridge University Press. pp. 1–202. ISBN 0-521-06936-X.
- Madelung, W. (1975). "The Minor Dynasties of Northern Iran". In Frye, Richard N. (ed.). The Cambridge History of Iran: From the Arab Invasion to the Saljuqs. Vol. 4. Cambridge: Cambridge University Press. pp. 198–249. ISBN 0-521-20093-8.
- Edmund Bosworth, C. "ZIYARIDS". Encyclopaedia Iranica, Online Edition.
- Nazim, M. (1987). "Mākān b. Kākī". In Houtsma, Martijn Theodoor (ed.). E.J. Brill's first encyclopaedia of Islam, 1913–1936, Volume V: L–Moriscos. Leiden: BRILL. pp. 164–165. ISBN 90-04-08265-4.
- Busse, Heribert (1975). "Iran under the Būyids". In Frye, Richard N. (ed.). The Cambridge History of Iran: From the Arab Invasion to the Saljuqs. Vol. 4. Cambridge: Cambridge University Press. pp. 250–304. ISBN 0-521-20093-8.
- Dabashi, Hamid (2012). The World of Persian Literary Humanism. Harvard University Press.
- Rypka, Jan (1968). Kahn, Karl (ed.). History of Iranian Literature. D. Reidel Publishing Company.
- de Bruijn, J.T.P. (2019). "The Panegryical Qaside- A brief historical preview". In Yarshater, Ehsan (ed.). Persian Lyric Poetry in the Classical Era, 800-1500: Ghazals, Panegyrics and. Vol. II. I.B. Tauris.13
