= 930s =

Decade

The 930s decade ran from January 1, 930, to December 31, 939.

== Events ==
=== 930 ===
==== By place ====
====== Europe ======
- The Althing, the parliament of Iceland, is established at þingvellir ("Thing Fields"). Chieftains from various tribes gather for 2 weeks at a thing (assembly) to settle disputes, arrange marriages, etc.; it continues in existence into the 21st century, as the world's oldest parliament of the Icelandic Commonwealth.
- Bishopwearmouth is formed and settled in the north-east of England, after Æthelstan grants the lands to the Bishop of Durham.
- Gilbert, Duke of Lorraine, besieges Douai in West Francia.

====== Arabian Empire ======
- January 11 – Sack of Mecca: The Qarmatians, led by Abu Tahir al-Jannabi, sack Mecca, desecrating the Zamzam Well and carrying off the Black Stone to their homeland in Eastern Arabia.
- Mardavij ibn Ziyar is sent by Asfar ibn Shiruya along with his brother Shirzad, to capture the fortress of Shamiran in Tarom (Northern Iran), the capital of the Sallarid ruler Muhammad ibn Musafir. During the siege Mardavij is persuaded to revolt against Asfar, by letters from Makan ibn Kaki. With the help of the sons of the Sallarid, he kills other members of his tribe, including Shirzad. Mardavij founds the Ziyarid Dynasty and becomes the ruler of Asfar's former territories, which include Rey, Qazvin, Zanjan, Abhar, Qom and Karaj.

====== Asia ======
- October 16 – Emperor Daigo of Japan, being fatally ill, abdicates in favor of his 7-year-old son Suzaku, after a 33-year reign. He enters the Buddhist priesthood, but dies shortly after. Former Emperor Uda (Daigo's father), remains the power behind the Japanese throne (until 931).
- The independent Korean island state of Usan-guk becomes a protectorate of Goryeo.
- Yelü Bei, prince and elder brother of the Liao dynasty (Khitan) Emperor Taizong, leaves for China.

=== 931 ===
==== By place ====
====== North Africa ======
- The Ummayad Caliphate of Córdoba invades and conquers the city of Ceuta, which was ruled by the Berber dynasty Banu Isam.

====== Europe ======
- Spring – Hugh of Provence, king of Italy, cedes Lower Burgundy to Rudolph II, in return for Rudolf's renunciation of all claims to the Italian crown. He receives the imperial crown, and induces the Italian nobility to recognize his son Lothair II as the co-ruler of Lombardia (Regnum Italiae).
- King Harald Fairhair of Norway dies after a 59-year reign as the Scandinavian nation's first ruler. He divides the kingdom among his many sons (about 25 years ago) to bring peace. Unable to travel through the country - and perform his royal duties, Harald hands over power to his favorite son Eric Bloodaxe, who allegedly kills at least two of his brothers to gain the Norwegian throne that he will hold (approximate date).
- Rollo, duke of Normandy, dies at Rouen after an 11-year reign. He is the first leader of the Viking settlers to establish an independent dukedom (a vassal of the West Frankish Kingdom). His eldest son, William I Longsword, becomes the second ruler of Normandy (approximate date).
- Ramiro II forces the abdication of his brother Alfonso IV and becomes king of León (Northern Spain). He has Alfonso and Fruela's three sons blinded in order to make them incapable of ruling.
- Ramiro II expands the border eastwards (nearly to the Pyrenees) and captures Burgos and the surrounding land. This land would soon be known as the County of Castile (approximate date).

====== England ======
- King Morgan Hen of Glywysing and Gwent (Wales) submits to the overlordship of King Æthelstan, and attends his court with Kings Hywel Dda of Deheubarth and Idwal Foel of Gwynedd.

====== Asia ======
- Emir Mardavij ibn Ziyar defeats and kills his rival Asfar ibn Shiruya. He conquers in rapid succession the Abbasid cities of Hamadan, Dinavar, and Kashan, and finally the entire region of Isfahan, which becomes his capital. Mardavij appoints his brother Vushmgir as the governor of Amol (modern Iran).

==== By topic ====
====== Literature ======
- Nómina Leonesa, an account of the kings of Asturias and León, is published (approximate date).

====== Religion ======
- March – Pope Stephen VII dies after a three-year reign. He is succeeded by John XI (at the age of 20) as the 125th pope of the Catholic Church. His mother Marozia is the powerful senatrix and patricia of Rome.

=== 932 ===
==== By place ====
====== Europe ======
- Summer – Alberic II leads an uprising at Rome against his stepfather Hugh of Provence, king of Italy, after he is insulted at the wedding of his mother, Marozia. Alberic seizes the Lateran Palace, and Hugh escapes with an escort out of the city. Marozia is captured and put in prison. Alberic takes control of the city and appoints himself as the ruler (princeps) of Rome.
- Doge Orso II Participazio retires voluntarily to a monastery, marking the end of the Participazio dominance of the Venetian dogeship. He is succeeded by Pietro II Candiano, the son and namesake of the earlier doge Pietro I.
- Pietro II and Capodistria make a trade agreement without imperial authorization, the self-proclaimed "Marquis" Wintkar forbids repaying any debts to Venice. Pietro begins an economic blockade of Istrian cities.

====== Asia ======
- Emir Mardavij ibn Ziyar invades Tabaristan and captures the city of Gorgan. The Daylamite military leader Makan ibn Kaki tries to reclaim his territories, but fails. He seeks refuge among the Samanids and enters the service of their ruler Nasr II. He appoints him as governor of Kirman (modern Iran).

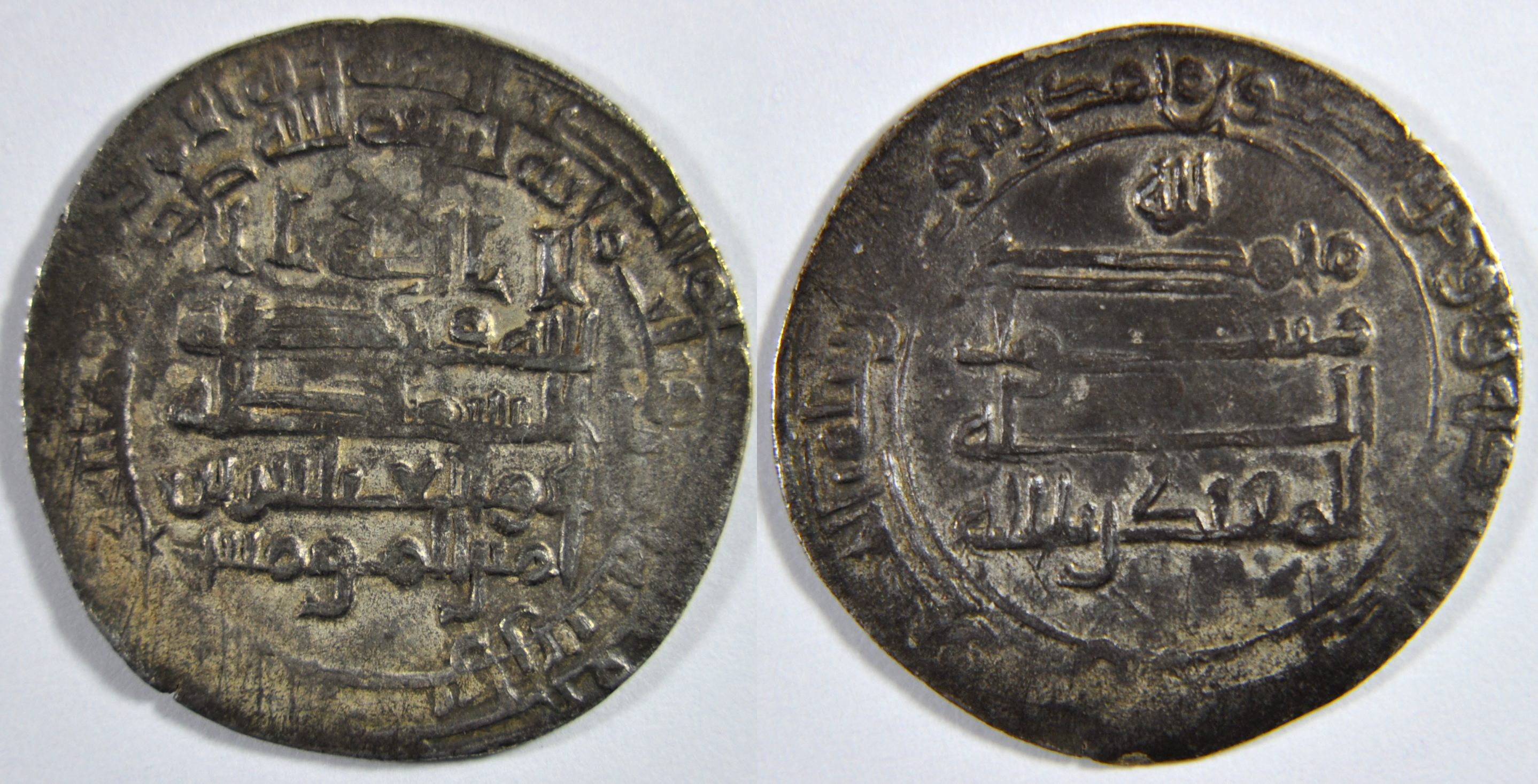
Dirham of Abbasid caliph Al-Muqtadir (r. 908–932)

- October 31 – Abbasid caliph al-Muqtadir is killed while fighting against the forces of general Mu'nis al-Muzaffar. Al-Muqtadir's brother al-Qahir is chosen to succeed him.

==== By topic ====
====== Religion ======
- Summer – Pope John XI is forced to grant power over Rome to his half-brother Alberic II, who is invested as "Prince and Senator of all Romans". John is to resign himself to spiritual leadership of the Catholic Church.

=== 933 ===
==== By place ====
====== Europe ======
- Spring – Hugh of Provence, king of Italy, launches an expedition to Rome to remove the Roman ruler (princeps) Alberic II and avenge his humiliation (see 932). It fails, however, as Roman civic militias repel the Lombard army. Hugh ravages the Italian countryside, before he withdraws to Pavia.
- March 15 – Battle of Merseburg: King Henry I ("the Fowler") defeats the Magyars near Merseburg after his refusal to pay the annual tribute. During Henry's lifetime they never raid the East Frankish Kingdom again.
- William I ("Longsword"), duke of Normandy, recognizes King Rudolph as his overlord. In turn he gives William the Cotentin Peninsula and the Channel Islands.

====== England ======
- Prince Edwin, the youngest son of the late King Edward the Elder, is drowned en route to the West Frankish Kingdom and buried at Saint Bertin.

====== Africa ======
- Fatimid forces fail to seize the Maghreb al-Aqsa (modern Morocco) from the local Berber tribes allied to the Iberia-based Caliphate of Córdoba.

=== 934 ===
==== By place ====
====== Byzantine Empire ======
- Spring and Summer – The Hungarians make an alliance with the Pechenegs, and fight their way through Thrace to Constantinople.
- Battle of W.l.n.d.r: The Hungarians and Pechenegs kill Constantinople's inhabitants, inflict severe damage on the countryside, and defeat both the Byzantine Empire and Bulgaria, forcing them to pay tribute. Emperor Romanos I signs a peace treaty with the Hungarians.

====== Europe ======
- King Henry I ("the Fowler") pacifies the territories to the north, where the Danish Vikings have been harrying the Frisians by sea. He defeats the Danes petty King Gnupa, and conquers Hedeby.
- Summer – Caliph Abd-al-Rahman III invades Navarra and forces Queen Toda to submit to him. Her son the 15-year-old King García Sánchez I becomes a vassal of the Caliphate of Córdoba.
- Haakon I ("the Good"), a son of the late King Harald Fairhair, once again reunites the kingdom after he has deposed his half-brother Eric Bloodaxe. Haakon is installed as king of Norway.
- The Eldgjá volcanic eruption is the largest basalt flood in history (first documented).

====== England ======
- King Tewdwr of Brycheiniog attends the court of King Æthelstan and signs the English Land Charters. Kings Hywel Dda of Deheubarth, Idwal Foel of Gwynedd and Morgan Mwynfawr ("the Old") of Morgannwg are compelled to accompany Æthelstan on his campaign against King Constantine II of Scotland.

====== Abbasid Caliphate ======
- April 24 – Abbasid caliph al-Qahir is deposed and blinded; he is succeeded by his nephew ar-Radi.
- Summer – Ali ibn Buya, a Samanid governor, takes advantage of the anarchy in Persia and conquers Fars (modern Iran). He founds the Buyid Dynasty, and makes Shiraz his capital. Ali seeks the recognition of the Abbasid caliph Ar-Radi, who confirms him later as his viceroy.

====== Asia ======
- March 16 – Meng Zhixiang, a military governor (jiedushi), declares himself emperor (formally called "Gaozu") and establishes Later Shu as a new Chinese state, independent of Later Tang. He dies after a short-lived five-month reign and is succeeded by his son Meng Chang.
- Goryeo forces push the army of Hubaekje back into its heartland and defeat them finally at Hongseong (modern South Korea).

==== By topic ====
====== Religion ======
- Einsiedeln Abbey, a Benedictine monastery, is founded (modern Switzerland).

=== 935 ===
==== By place ====
====== Europe ======
- Spring – Arnulf I ("the Bad") of Bavaria invades Italy, crossing through the Upper Adige (modern Tyrol). He proceeds towards Verona to join his supporters. King Hugh of Provence takes a Burgundian army against him, and defeats Arnulf at Gossolengo, forcing him to return to Bavaria.
- Summer – Fatimid caliph al-Qa'im dispatches a naval expedition under Ya'qub ibn Ishaq al-Tamimi to raid the coast of Provence and Liguria, sacking Genoa on 16 August and attacking Pisa. Ya'qub also raids Corsica and Sardinia before returning to Mahdia with some 8,000 prisoners.
- September 28 (probable year) – Wenceslaus I, Duke of Bohemia (the subject of the 1853 Christmas carol "Good King Wenceslas") is murdered by a group of nobles led by his brother Boleslaus I ("the Cruel"), who succeeds him.
- Córdoba, capital of Al-Andalus, becomes the largest city of the world, taking the lead from Baghdad, capital of the Abbasid Caliphate.

====== Africa ======
- Summer – Muhammad ibn Tughj al-Ikhshid is appointed governor and becomes the ruler of Egypt and parts of Syria (or the Levant). He launches a campaign against his rival Ahmad ibn Kayghalagh by land and sea: the naval forces take Tinnis and ibn Kayghalagh is forced to retreat. Ibn Tughj enters Fustat, making it his capital, and founds the Ikhshidid dynasty.
- Ziri ibn Manad is installed as governor of central Maghreb. He initiates the construction of the fortress of Ashir, near Médéa (modern Algeria). It symbolises the rise of the Zirid dynasty in the Western Mediterranean region.

====== Arabian Empire ======
- January – Emir Mardavij, founder of the Ziyarid dynasty, is murdered by his Turkish slaves. He is succeeded by his brother and general Vushmgir, who is crowned as the new Ziyarid ruler in Rey (modern Iran).

====== Asia ======
- March – King Kyŏn Hwŏn of Later Baekje is overthrown by his eldest son Kyŏn Sin-gŏm (who is crowned on November 15) and put in prison, but he is able to escape.
- November 17 – Wang Yanjun, Emperor Huizong of Min (Ten Kingdoms), is killed in his own palace in an uprising together with his empress consort and several clansmen, and succeeded as second emperor by his son Wang Jipeng.
- King Gyeongsun, the last ruler of Unified Silla, formally surrenders and abdicates in favour of Taejo of Goryeo. This completes Taejo's unification of Korea, bringing the Silla dynasty to an end.
- Ki no Tsurayuki returns to Kyoto from Tosa Province, a journey that becomes the basis of the earliest surviving Japanese poetic diary, called the Tosa Nikki (Tosa Diary).

==== By topic ====
====== Religion ======
- Winter (probable year) – Pope John XI, the son of de facto Roman ruler Marozia, dies at Rome after a four-year reign, aged between 25 and 27.

=== 936 ===
==== By place ====
====== Europe ======
- June 19 – At Laon, Louis IV, the 14-year old son of the late King Charles the Simple, is crowned King of West Francia after being recalled from Wessex by Hugh the Great, count of Paris. Hugh, whose father, King Robert I, was killed in battle near Soissons in 923, is given the title Duke of the Franks and becomes the second most powerful man in the West Frankish Kingdom. The crowning of Louis IV follows the death of King Rudolph I at Auxerre earlier in the year.
- Summer – Hugh of Provence, king of Italy, dispatches his son and co-ruler Lothair II with a third expedition to Rome to dislodge Alberic II. Assault after assault is repulsed by the Roman civic militia. At length, weakened by an epidemic, the Lombard nobles press on Hugh to accept a peace treaty mediated by Odo of Cluny.
- July 2 – King Henry I ("the Fowler") dies at his royal palace in Memleben, Thuringia, after a 17-year reign. He is succeeded by his 23-year-old son Otto I, who is married to Eadgyth, a daughter of the late King Edward the Elder. Otto is the first German king to be crowned in Charlemagne's former capital of Aachen.
- A Hungarian army invades Franconia and occupies Fulda. They are attacked by East Frankish forces and forced to go westwards. Otto I moves against the rebellious Elbe Slavs.
- Archbishop Unni of Hamburg-Bremen visits the king of Denmark Gorm and the king of the Swedes Ring before he dies in Birka.

====== England ======
- King Æthelstan sets the border between the Kingdom of England and Cornwall as the east bank of the River Tamar.

====== Africa ======
- Spring – Muhammad ibn Tughj al-Ikhshid, ruler of Egypt and Syria, defeats the Fatimid forces near Alexandria. He drives them out of the city, forcing the Fatimids to retreat from Egypt to their base at Cyrenaica.

====== Arabian Empire ======
- Summer – Ibn Muqla, an Abbasid official and vizier, is disgraced after his failed campaign against Muhammad ibn Ra'iq, the rebellious governor of Wasit. He is arrested and imprisoned in Baghdad.

====== China ======
- November 28 – Shi Jingtang is enthroned as the first emperor of the Later Jin by Tai Zong, ruler of the Khitan-led Liao Dynasty, following a revolt against his rival, emperor Fei of Later Tang.

==== By topic ====
====== Religion ======
- January 3 – Pope Leo VII succeeds John XI (who died the previous year) as the 126th pope of the Catholic Church.

=== 937 ===
==== By place ====
====== Europe ======
- A Hungarian army invades Burgundy, and burns the city of Tournus. Then they go southwards to Italy, pillaging the environs of Naples, Benevento and Monte Cassino. When the Hungarians return home, they are attacked in the Apennine Mountains by Lombard forces, losing their plunder (approximate date).
- July 11 – King Rudolph II of Burgundy dies after a 25-year reign, and is succeeded by his 12-year-old son Conrad I ("the Peaceful"). His wife, Queen Bertha, takes effective control of unified Burgundy, transferring its capital to Arles (that Burgundian kingdom was later known from the 12th century as the Kingdom of Arles).
- King Otto I refuses to give land to his older (illegitimate) half-brother Thankmar, who gains the support of Eberhard III (duke of Franconia) and Wichmann the Elder, and seizes the fortress of Eresburg. Otto assumes direct rule over Franconia, and dissolves it into smaller counties.
- King Hugh of Arles (king of Italy) travels to Colombier (Switzerland) and marries Rudolph's widow Bertha. He takes Conrad I under his tutelage and betroths Rudolph's 6-year-old daughter Adelaide with his own son and co-ruler Lothair II.
- Winter – Gero succeeds his brother Siegfried after his death. King Otto I appoints him as count and margrave of a vast border region around Merseburg that abuts the Wends on the River Saale (Lower Saxony).
- Magdeburg becomes the capital of the East Frankish Kingdom, after a Diet held by King Otto I (approximate date).

====== England ======
- Battle of Brunanburh: King Æthelstan defeats a combined Northern Army under the kings Olaf of Dublin, Constantine II of Scotland and Owain of Strathclyde. Though none of the British monarchs appear to have taken part, the people of Strathclyde were a major contingent under their Scottish king.

====== Asia ======
- November 10 – Li Bian usurps the throne and deposes Emperor Yang Pu. The Wu State is replaced and Li (called "Xu Zhigao") becomes the first emperor of Southern Tang, one of the Ten Kingdoms in southern China.
- Winter – The Later Tang falls to the Later Jin (during the Five Dynasties and Ten Kingdoms period) founded by Emperor Shi Jingtang (posthumously known as "Gaozu of Jin").

=== 938 ===
==== By place ====
====== Europe ======
- Summer – The Hungarian army invades Northern Italy with the permission of King Hugh of Arles. They cross the Apennines, and sack the Lombard lands in Tuscany, Lazio and Campania. Finally, the Hungarians are defeated at Wolfenbüttel by a Saxon army.
- July – King Otto I besieges the fortress of Eresburg. He defeats his half-brother Thankmar and kills him as he tries to find sanctuary. Eberhard III, duke of Franconia, is banished and replaced by his uncle Berthold.
- Fall – Otto I defeats in two campaigns a series of uprisings in Saxony, Franconia and Lotharingia. He signs a "friendship pact" with King Louis IV ("d'Outremer") of the West Frankish Kingdom.

====== Asia ======
- Battle of Bach Dang: Vietnamese forces defeat an invading force of the Southern Han state at the Bach Dang River. This put an end to Chinese imperial domination in Vietnam after nearly 1,000 years.
- The Sixteen Prefectures, which includes the area around modern-day Beijing, are absorbed in the Khitan Empire.

=== 939 ===
==== By place ====
====== Europe ======
- Hugh the Great, count of Paris, rebels against King Louis IV ("d'Outremer") and gains support from William I, duke of Normandy. Hugh, along with Herbert II, count of Vermandois, Arnulf I, count of Flanders and William pay homage to King Otto I (ruler of the East Frankish Kingdom), and support him in his struggle against Louis.
- July 19 – Battle of Simancas: Caliph Abd-al-Rahman III of Córdoba claims a Jihad ('Holy War') and raises an army of 100,000 men to end the Kingdom of León. He razes the cities of Medina del Campo, Ìscar and Alcazarén (previously abandoned by their population) and finally, reaches the city of Simancas (near modern-day Valladolid), where Christian forces under King Ramiro II wait for him. After three days, Ramiro defeats the Moorish army with an alliance of Castile and Navarre. Abd-al-Rahman orders a retreat along the Duero River, and is almost killed, due, most likely, to treason by Arab elements in the Moorish army.
- August 1 – Battle of Trans-la-Forêt: Bretons defeat Viking occupiers.
- August 5 – Battle of Alhandic: Abd-al-Rahman III defeats the garrison of those loyal to Ramiro II at Zamora, in the context of the Spanish Reconquista.
- October 2 – Battle of Andernach: Otto I crushes a rebellion against his rule, by a coalition of Eberhard III, duke of Franconia, and other Frankish dukes, in Andernach on the Rhine River. Otto prevails, with support from Odo of Wetterau. Eberhard is killed while Gilbert, duke of Lotharingia (or Lorraine) drowns when trying to escape.

====== England ======
- October 27 – King Æthelstan dies at Gloucester after a 15-year reign. He is buried at Malmesbury Abbey and succeeded by his half-brother, Edmund I ("the Magnificent"). After Æthelstan's death Olaf Guthfrithson (or his cousin, Anlaf Cuaran) a Viking leader who rules Dublin, is proclaimed king of York (south of Northumbria).

====== Asia ======
- Taira no Masakado, a Japanese nobleman, leads one of the largest insurgent forces in the Heian period against the imperial court at Kyoto. Masakado has acquired enough power to govern the Kantō region (northwest of Edo) and calls himself the 'new emperor' (shinnō).
- Ngô Quyền, who the previous year defeated the Chinese at the Battle of Bạch Đằng (938) thereby regaining Vietnamese independence after 1000 years, becomes king of Vietnam.

==== By topic ====
====== Religion ======
- July 13 – Pope Leo VII dies at Rome after a 3½-year reign. He is succeeded by Stephen VIII as the 127th pope of the Catholic Church.
- The Major Occultation (or Al-Ghaybah al-Kubra) of Muhammad al-Mahdi occurs (approximate date).

== Significant people ==
- Al-Muqtadir
- Constantine VII
- Pope John XI
- Pope Leo VII
- Al-Qahir
- Al-Radi
- Al-Ash'ari

== Births ==
930

- Alferius, Italian abbot and saint (d. 1050)
- Boleslaus II, duke of Bohemia (d. 999)
- Gisulf I, prince of Salerno (d. 977)
- Herbert of Wetterau, German nobleman (d. 992)
- Lambert of Chalon, Frankish nobleman (d. 978)
- Liudolf,Swabia (approximate date) (d. 957)
- Mieszko I, prince of Poland (approximate date) (d. 992)
- Nikon the Metanoeite, Byzantine monk (d. 998)
- Odo I, German nobleman (approximate date) (d. 993)
- Ya'qub ibn Killis, Fatimid vizier (d. 991)
- Zhang Mi, Chinese Ci lyric poet (d. unknown)

931

- March 28 – Liu Chengyou, emperor of Later Han (d. 951)
- September 19 – Mu Zong, emperor of the Liao dynasty (d. 969)
- Adelaide, empress regent of the Holy Roman Empire (d. 999)
- Boris II, ruler (tsar) of the Bulgarian Empire (d. 977)
- Cao Bin, general of the Song dynasty (d. 999)
- Fu (the Elder), empress consort of Later Zhou (d. 956)
- Li Congyi (Prince of Xu), prince of Later Tang (d. 947)
- Liutgard of Saxony, duchess consort of Lorraine (d. 953)
- Taksony, Grand Prince of Hungary (approximate date)
- Yang Guangmei, Chinese general (approximate date)

932

- August 28 – Richard I, duke of Normandy (d. 996)
- September 26 – Al-Mu'izz, Fatimid caliph (d. 975)
- Abu Firas al-Hamdani, Arab prince and poet (or 933)
- Miskawayh, Persian philosopher and historian (d. 1030)
- Sancho I (the Fat), king of León (approximate date)

933

- Al-Hakim Nishapuri, Persian Sunni scholar (d. 1014)

934

- Dong Yuan, Chinese painter (approximate date)
- Wolfgang, bishop of Regensburg (approximate date)

935

- Al-Qadi Abd al-Jabbar, Mu'tazilite theologian (d. 1025)
- Eochaid ua Flannacáin, Irish cleric and poet (d. 1004)
- Elvira Ramírez, princess and regent of León (approximate date)
- Folcuin, Frankish abbot of Saint Bertin (approximate date)
- Gao Qiong, Chinese general and governor (jiedushi) (d. 1006)
- Gerard of Toul, German priest and bishop (d. 994)
- Hrosvitha, German canoness and poet (approximate date)
- Michitsuna no Haha, Japanese female poet (d. 995)
- Ukhtanes of Sebastia, Armenian historian (d. 1000)
- Wulfrun, English noblewoman (approximate date)

936

- September 24 – 'Adud al-Dawla, ruler of the Buyid Dynasty (d. 983)
- Abu al-Qasim al-Zahrawi, Muslim physician and surgeon (d. 1013)
- Gunnor, duchess consort of Normandy (approximate date)
- Zhou ("the Elder"), queen consort of Southern Tang (approximate date)

937

- Attilanus, bishop of Zamora (d. 1007)
- Bagrat II, king of Iberia and Kartli (d. 994)
- Gu Hongzhong, Chinese painter (d. 975)
- Haakon Sigurdsson, Viking ruler (d. 995)
- Khalaf ibn Ahmad, Saffarid emir (d. 1009)
- Li Yu, ruler of Southern Tang (approximate date)
- Meng Xuanzhe, prince of Later Shu (d. 991)
- William IV, duke of Aquitaine (d. 994)

938

- September 14 – Sahib ibn Abbad, Buyid grand vizier (d. 995)
- Almanzor, Umayyad vizier and de facto ruler (approximate date)
- Beatrice of France, duchess regent of Upper Lorraine (approximate date)
- García Fernández, count of Castile and Álava (approximate date)
- Olaf the Peacock, Icelandic merchant and chieftain (approximate date)
- Romanos II, Byzantine emperor (d. 963)
- Sancho II, king of Navarre (approximate date)

939

- November 20 – Tai Zong, emperor of the Song dynasty (d. 997)
- Fujiwara no Takamitsu, Japanese waka poet (approximate date)
- Hai Gaon, Jewish theologian and rabbi (d. 1038)

== Deaths ==
930

- May 31 – Liu Hua, princess of Southern Han (b. 896)
- June 19 – Xiao Qing, chancellor of Later Liang (b. 862)
- June 20 – Hucbald, Frankish monk and music theorist
- October 26 – Li Qi, chancellor of Later Liang (b. 871)
- November 19 – Yan Keqiu, Chinese chief strategist
- December 2 – Ma Yin, Chinese warlord and king (b. 853)
- Amoghavarsha II, ruler of Rashtrakuta (India)
- García II Sánchez, duke of Gascony (approximate date)
- Sharwin II, ruler of the Bavand Dynasty (Iran)
- Xia Luqi, general of Later Tang (b. 882)
- Abū Kāmil Shujāʿ ibn Aslam, Egyptian mathematician (b. c. 850)
- Óengus mac Óengusa, Irish poet and Chief Ollam of Ireland

931

- January 27 – Ruotger, archbishop of Trier
- April 4 – Kong Xun, Chinese governor (b. 884)
- May 29 – Jimeno Garcés, king of Pamplona
- June 25 – An Chonghui, general of Later Tang

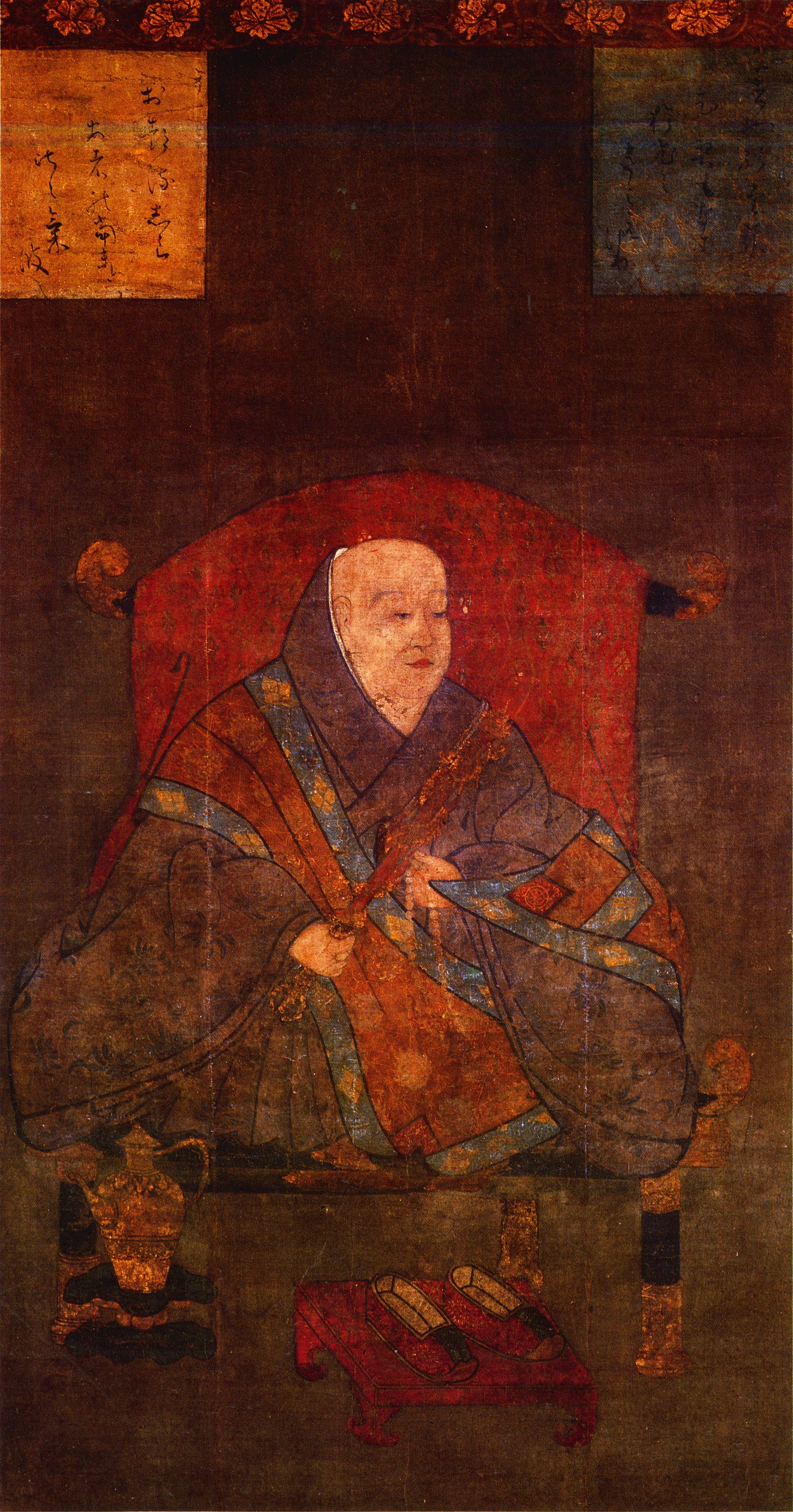
Emperor Uda

- Abu'l-Fadl al-Isfahani, Persian religious leader
- Asfar ibn Shiruya, Iranian military leader
- Bard Boinne, Irish poet and Chief Ollam
- Béatrice of Vermandois, Frankish queen
- Gausbert, count of Empúries and Roussillon
- Gu Quanwu, general of the Tang dynasty (b. 864)
- Harald I, king of Norway (approximate date)
- Hrotheweard (or Lodeward), archbishop of York
- Ibn Masarra, Muslim ascetic and scholar (b. 883)
- Christopher Lekapenos, Byzantine co-emperor
- Robert II, bishop of Tours (approximate date)
- Rollo, Viking leader and count (approximate date)
- Stephen VII, pope of the Catholic Church
- Wang Yanbing, prince of Min (Ten Kingdoms)

932

- May 6 – Qian Liu, Chinese warlord and king (b. 852)
- May 18 – Ma Shaohong, general of Later Tang
- June 1 – Thietmar, duke of Saxony
- June 10 – Dong Zhang, Chinese general
- August 15 – Ma Xisheng, king of Chu (b. 899)
- October 31 – Al-Muqtadir, Abbasid caliph (b. 895)

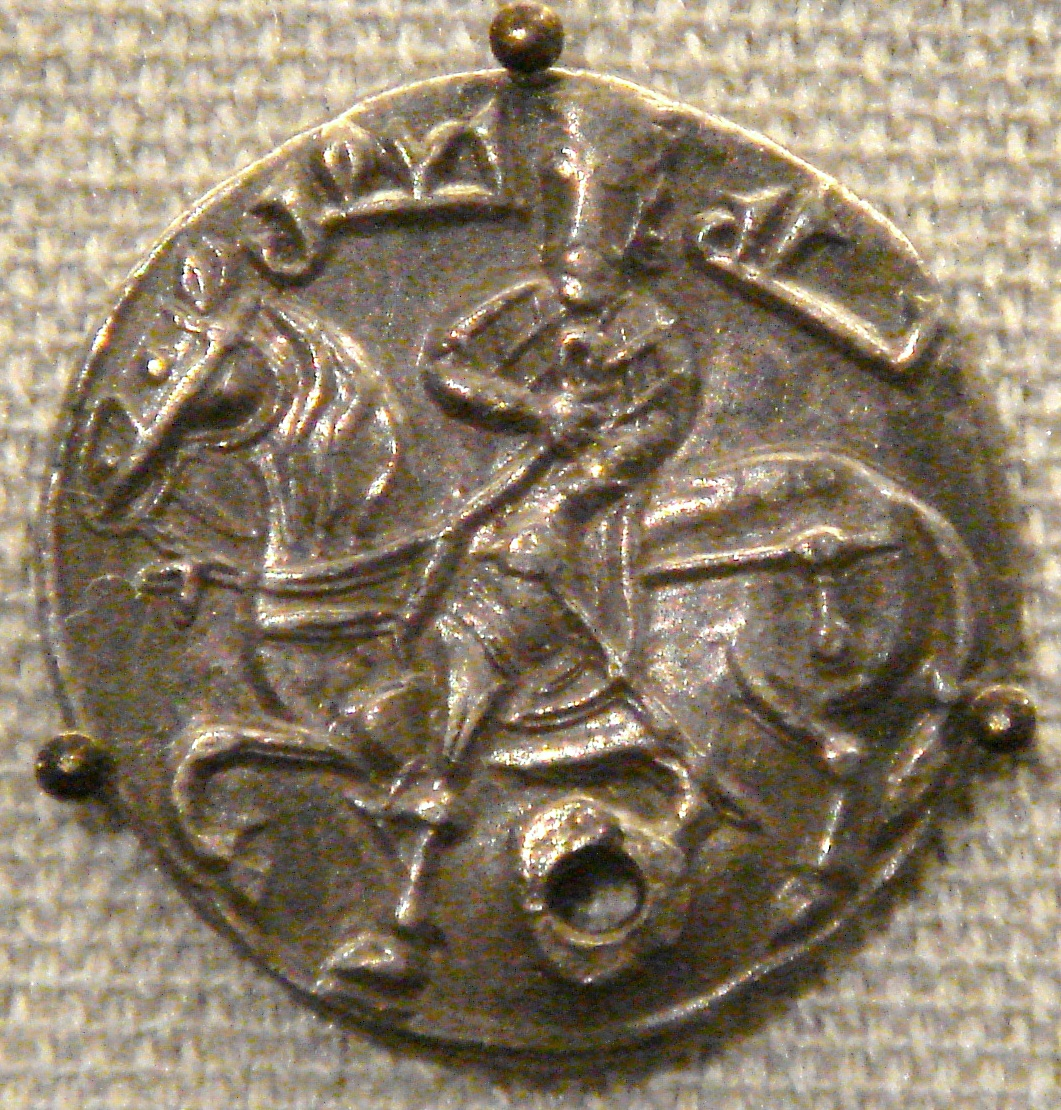
Al-Muqtadir's silver Dirham. (Abbasid caliph Al-Muqtadir was assassinated on 31 October 932)

- Fujiwara no Sadakata, Japanese poet (b. 873)
- Isaac Judaeus, Arab Jewish physician (approximate date)
- Orso II Participazio, doge of Venice
- Reginar II, Frankish nobleman (b. 890)
- Rollo, duke of Normandy (approximate date)

933

- March 10 – Li Renfu, Chinese warlord and governor
- March 16 – Takin al-Khazari, Abbasid governor of Egypt
- November 21 – Al-Tahawi, Arab imam and scholar (b. 853)
- December 9 – Li Congrong, prince of Later Tang
- December 15 – Li Siyuan, emperor of Later Tang (b. 867)
- December 18 – Yaonian Yanmujin, Chinese empress dowager
- Acfred II, count of Carcassonne and Razès (France)
- Adelolf, count of Boulogne (approximate date)
- Alfonso IV, king of León and Galicia (Spain)
- Du Guangting, Chinese Taoist priest and writer (b. 850)
- Ealdred I, ruler ('king') of Bernicia (approximate date)
- Edwin, English prince and son of Edward the Elder
- Fujiwara no Kanesuke, Japanese nobleman (b. 877)
- Harald Fairhair, king of Norway (approximate date)
- Ibn Duraid, Arab poet and philologist (b. 837)
- Mu'nis al-Muzaffar, Abbasid general
- Shaghab, mother and de facto co-ruler of Al-Muqtadir
- Tryphon, patriarch of Constantinople

934

- March 4 – Abdullah al-Mahdi Billah, Fatimid caliph (b. 873)
- May 9 – Wang Sitong, Chinese general and governor (b. 892)
- May 14
  - Feng Yun, Chinese chancellor (approximate date)
  - Zhu Hongzhao, Chinese general and governor
- May 16 – Meng Hanqiong, eunuch official of Later Tang
- September 7 – Meng Zhixiang, Chinese general (b. 874)
- November 1 – Beornstan, bishop of Winchester
- November 2 – Emma, queen of the West Frankish Kingdom
- Abu Zayd al-Balkhi, Abbasid mathematician and physician
- Gervadius, Irish hermit and saint (approximate date)
- Gofraid ua Ímair, Viking leader and king of Dublin
- Li Conghou, emperor of Later Tang (b. 914)
- Li Renhan, Chinese general and governor
- Melias, Byzantine general (strategos)
- Olaf Haraldsson, son of Harald Fairhair
- Sale Ngahkwe, king of Pagan (Burma)
- Uallach ingen Muinecháin, Irish poet
- Xu Zhixun, general of Wu (Ten Kingdoms)
- Xue Wenjie, official of Min (Ten Kingdoms)

935

- January 22 – Ma, empress of Southern Han
- January – Mardavij, founder of the Ziyarid dynasty (Iran), assassinated
- September 28 – Wenceslaus I, duke of Bohemia (b. c. 907), assassinated
- October 24 – Li Yu, Chinese official and chancellor
- November 17 – assassination:
  - Wang Yanjun, emperor of Min (Ten Kingdoms)
  - Chen Jinfeng, empress consort of Min (b. 893)
- Dai Siyuan, general of Later Liang (Five Dynasties)
- Govinda IV, ruler of the Rashtrakuta Dynasty (India)
- Gruffydd ab Owain, king of Glywysing (approximate date)
- John XI, pope of the Catholic Church (approximate date)
- Li Yichao, Chinese warlord and governor (jiedushi)
- Niftawayh, Abbasid scholar and grammarian (b. 858)
- Trpimir II, king of Croatia (approximate date)
- Werner V, Frankish nobleman (approximate date)
- Yang Dongqian, Chinese official and chancellor
- Zhao Feng, Chinese official and chancellor

936

- February 13 – Xiao Wen, empress of the Liao Dynasty
- July 2 – Henry the Fowler, king of the East Frankish Kingdom
- July 5 – Xu Ji, official and chancellor of Former Shu
- September 17 – Unni, archbishop of Hamburg-Bremen
- September 27 – Kyŏn Hwŏn, king of Later Baekje (b. 867)
- December 25 – Zhang Jingda, general of Later Tang
- Abu Bakr ibn Mujāhid, Muslim canonical reader and scholar
- Abu al-Hasan al-Ash'ari, Muslim Shafi'i scholar (b. 874)
- Al-Muntakhab al-Hasan, ruler of the Rassid Dynasty
- Andrew of Constantinople, Byzantine saint
- Gagik I of Vaspurakan, Armenian king (or 943)
- Ibn al-Mughallis, Muslim theologian and jurist
- Murchadh mac Sochlachan, king of Uí Maine (Ireland)
- Rudolph I, king of the West Frankish Kingdom
- Dandi Mahadevi, Indian queen regnant

937

- January 11
  - Cao, empress of Later Tang
  - Li Chongmei, prince of Later Tang
  - Li Congke, emperor of Later Tang (b. 885)
  - Liu, empress of Later Tang
- January 14 – Zhang Yanlang, Chinese official
- July 11 – Rudolph II, king of Burgundy
- July 14 – Arnulf I, duke of Bavaria
- October 10 – Wang Lingmou, chancellor of Wu
- December 3 – Siegfried, Frankish nobleman
- Ælfwine, bishop of Lichfield (approximate date)
- Abbo, adviser and bishop of Soissons
- Alphege, bishop of Wells (approximate date)
- David II, king of Iberia/Kartli (Georgia)
- David ibn Merwan, Jewish philosopher
- Dubacan of Angus, Scottish nobleman
- Ermengol, Frankish nobleman (b. 870)
- Gebeachan, king of the Isles (Hebrides)
- Liu Yanhao, general of Later Tang
- Marozia, Roman noblewoman (b. 890)
- Tidhelm, bishop of Hereford (approximate date)
- Xu Jingqian, official and regent of Wu (b. 919)
- Yang Meng, prince of Wu (Ten Kingdoms)
- Yelü Bei, prince of the Liao Dynasty (b. 899)
- Zhao Dejun, general of Later Tang

938

- February 3 – Zhou Ben, general of Wu (b. 862)
- July 28 – Thankmar, half-brother of Otto I (during the Siege of Eresburg)
- Lady Ise, Japanese noblewoman and poet (b. 875) (approximate date)
- Lady Peng, noblewoman of Chu (Ten Kingdoms)
- Muhammad ibn Ja'far al-Khara'iti, Abbasid theologian
- Shen Song, chancellor of Wuyue (b. 863)

939

- January 21 – Yang Pu, emperor of Wu (b. 900)
- May 25 – Yao Yanzhang, general of Chu
- July 13 – Leo VII, pope of the Catholic Church
- August 29
  - Li Chunyan, empress of Min (Ten Kingdoms)
  - Wang Jipeng, emperor of Min
- October 2
  - Eberhard III, duke of Franconia
  - Gilbert, duke of Lotharingia
- October 27 – Æthelstan, king of England
- November 28 – Lady Ma, Chinese noblewoman (b. 890)
- Ali ibn Babawayh Qummi, Twelver Shi'a scholar
- Ashot the Swift, prince of Tao-Klarjeti (Georgia)
- Pietro II Candiano, doge of Venice
