= 10th century =

One hundred years, from 901 to 1000

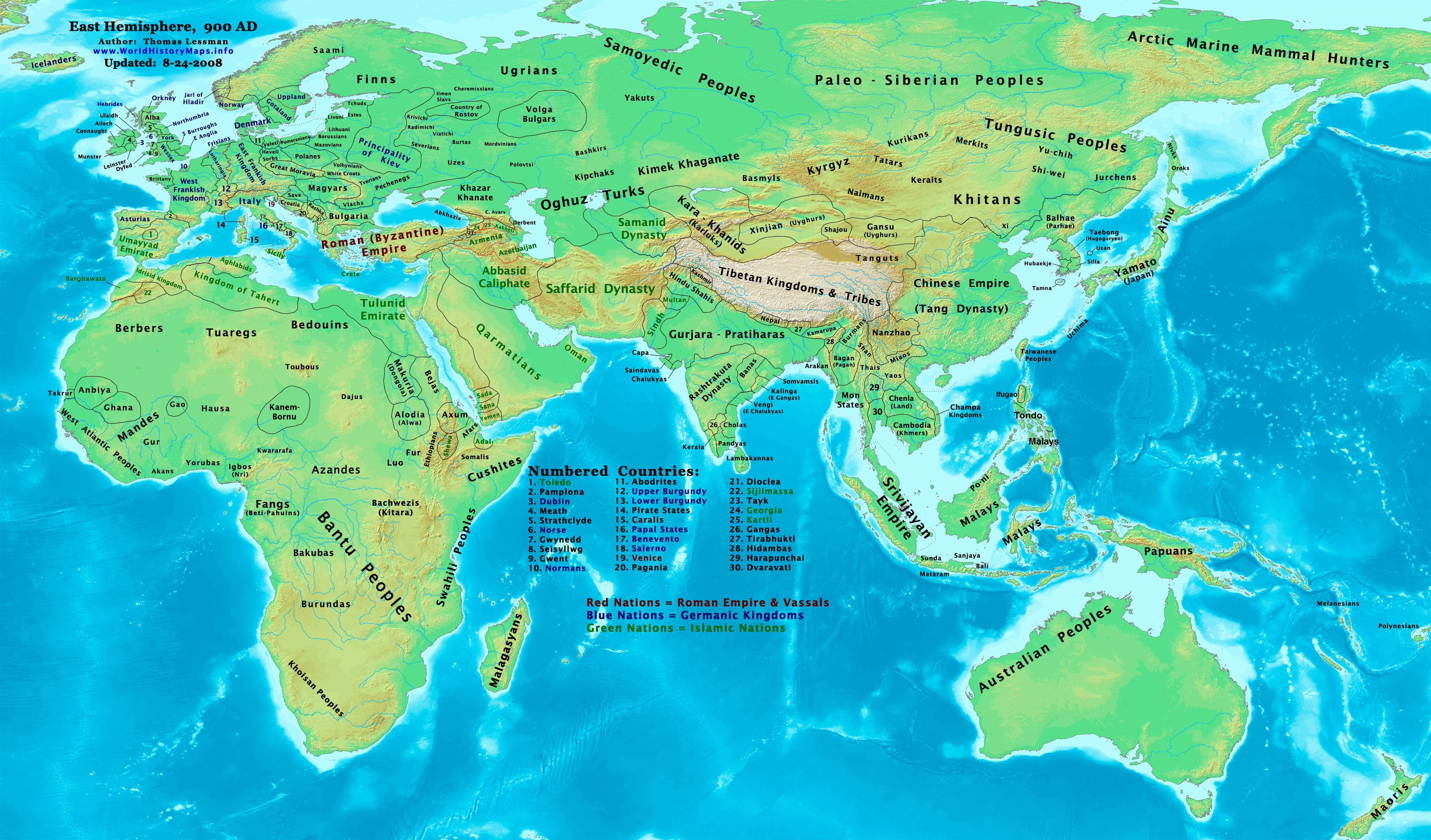
Eastern Hemisphere at the beginning of the 10th century

The 10th century was the period from 901 (represented by the Roman numerals CMI) through 1000 (M) in accordance with the Julian calendar, and the last century of the 1st millennium.

In China, the Song dynasty was established, with most of China reuniting after the fall of the Tang dynasty and the following Five Dynasties and Ten Kingdoms period. Vietnam finally achieves independence from Chinese dominion as a result. The Muslim World experienced a cultural zenith, especially in al-Andalus under the Caliphate of Córdoba and in the Samanid Empire under Ismail Samani. The Abbasid Caliphate continued to exist but with reduced central authority. Additionally, there was a cultural flourishing for the Byzantine Empire, which also reconquered some lost territories, and the First Bulgarian Empire, as well as the Holy Roman Empire during the Ottonian Renaissance. The historian Lynn White mentions of the period that "to the modern eye, it is very nearly the darkest of the Dark Ages ... if it was dark, it was the darkness of the womb". Caesar Baronius described it as the Iron Century, because it was 'iron in its harshness and in its sterility of goodness', while Lorenzo Valla gave it the similar name "Age of Lead and Iron".

== Events ==
- c. 950: The beginning of the Medieval Warm Period.

=== Africa ===
- The Nubian kingdoms of Makuria and Alodia reaches a golden age of prosperity and military power
- c. 909: The Fatimid Caliphate arises in Kabylie, Kutama Tribe.
- c. 948: The Nri Kingdom in what is now Southeastern Nigeria starts.
- 969: Cairo is founded near Fustat.
- 972: Cairo becomes the new Egyptian capital, and the seat of the Fatimid Caliphate.
- 973–974: Failure of the Second Qarmatian invasion of Egypt.
- 975: The Siege of Tripoli ends in an Egyptian victory over the Byzantine Army.
- c. 980: Al-Azhar University is established in Cairo during the rule of the Fatimid dynasty.
- c. 980: Queen Gudit leads her rebellion against the Aksumite dynasty of Abyssinia.

=== Americas ===
- Collapse of the central lowland Maya civilization. Post-Classic Maya period begins. Chichen Itza becomes a regional capital on the Yucatán Peninsula
- Rise of the Toltecs in Mexico
- Traditional date for the arrival of White Buffalo Calf Woman
- Golden age of the Ancestral Puebloans (Pueblo II Era)
- An earthquake hits the Seattle Fault c. 900-930
- The Mississippian culture begins in present-day Southern United States
- 987: Ah Mekat Tutul Xiu unified Uxmal, Mayapan, and Chichen Itza founding The League of Mayapan.

=== Asia ===
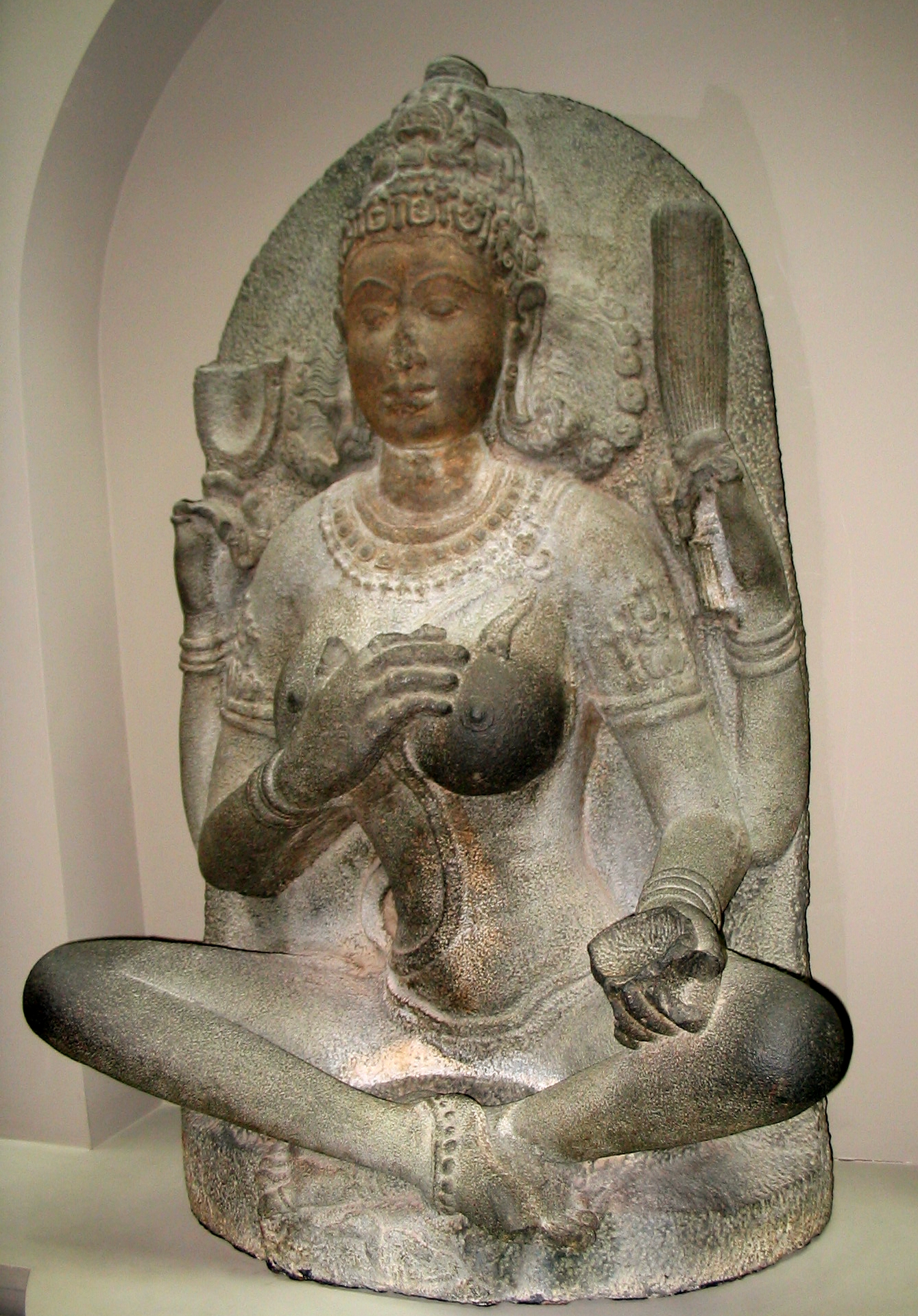
This statue of a yogini goddess was created in Kaveripakkam in Tamil Nadu, India, during the 10th century.

- Buddhist temple construction commences at Bagan, Burma
- Seafarers and merchants from Champa had contacts with Brunei and Ma-i.
- 907: Zhu Quanzhong deposes Emperor Ai of Tang and establishes a new Later Liang dynasty.
- 907: Sumbing volcano erupts, according to Rukam inscription.
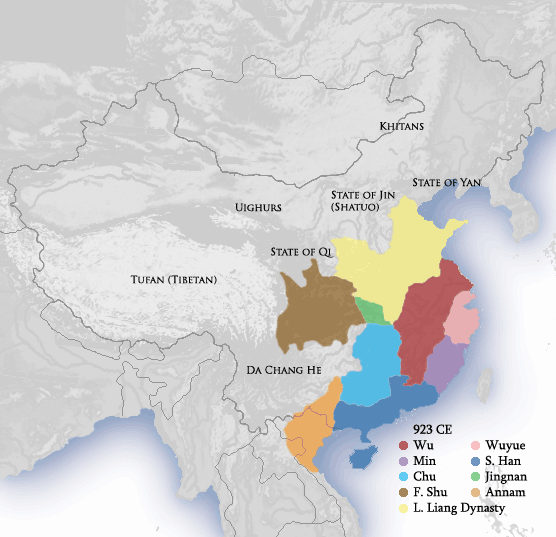
  China in 923, during the Five Dynasties and Ten Kingdoms period
- 907: King Balitung creates the Mantyasih inscription containing the list of Mataram kings, moves the capital from Mamratipura to Poh Pitu, and expands Prambanan temple.
- 910: Parantaka I of the Chola dynasty drives out the Pandyan from southern India into Lanka (now Sri Lanka), which he also eventually conquers.
- 914: The Warmadewa dynasty rules Bali.
- 919: the first use of gunpowder in battle occurs with the Chinese Battle of Langshan Jiang (Wolf Mountain River), where the Wuyue naval fleet under Qian Yuanguan defeats the Wu fleet. Qian had used flamethrowers ignited by gunpowder fuses to burn the Wu fleet.
- 928: Ziyarid dynasty is established in northern Iran.
- 928: During the reign of King Wawa, the capital of Mataram kingdom in Kewu Plain is devastated, probably by the massive eruption of Mount Merapi.
- 929: Mpu Sindok moves the seat of power of the Mataram Kingdom from Kewu Plain in Central Java to Tamwlang in East Java and establishes Isyana dynasty. The shift is probably as a result of the eruption of Mount Merapi and/or invasion from Srivijaya.
- 930s: Persian Shia Buyid dynasty establishes and controls central and western part of Iran as well as most of Iraq.
- 936: Goryeo dynasty unifies Later Three Kingdoms of Korea.
- 938: Battle of Bạch Đằng with a victory for the Tĩnh Hải Quân forces under the rule of Ngô Quyền put an end to nearly 1,000 years of Chinese imperial domination in Vietnam and marked a new beginning to the Vietnamese history.
- 937: Mpu Sindok moves the capital again from Tamwlang to Watugaluh, both near bank of Brantas River in modern Jombang in East Java.
- 960: Zhao Kuangyin establishes Song dynasty.
- 960: Seljuks convert to Islam.
- 965: Khazar kingdom is attacked and defeated by Kievan Rus.
- 971: Song dynasty recorded the ancient sovereign state of Ma-i on the list of states conducting trade in the south seas and the government's efforts to regulate and tax this "luxurious" trade.
- 975: Ghaznavids dynasty, as the first Turk Sultanate, was established in Central Asia.
- 979: Song dynasty reunites China.
- 980: Dynastic marriage between princess Mahendradatta of Javanese Isyanas and king Udayana of Balinese Warmadewas.
- Coastal cities on the Malay Peninsula are the seed for the first recorded Malay kingdoms.
- 990: King Dharmawangsa of Mataram kingdom launches a naval invasion on Palembang in an unsuccessful attempt to conquer Srivijaya. (to 1006)
- 990: Airlangga, son of King Udayana and Queen Mahendradatta was born in Bali.
- 996: Dharmawangsa commissioned the translation of the Mahabharata into Old Javanese.
- 999: Samanid dynasty was defeated and conquered by Ghaznavids.

=== Europe ===
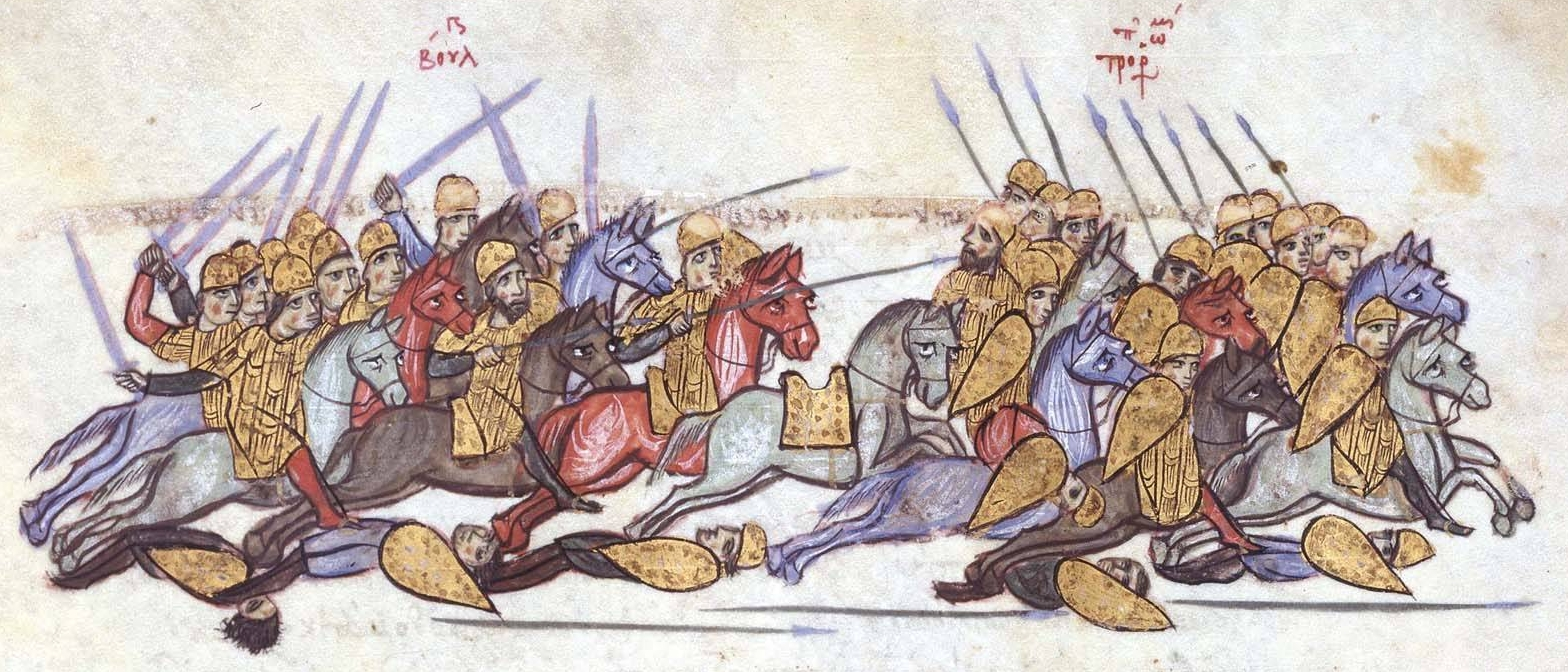
The Bulgarian victory at Anchialos.

- Viking groups settle in northern France.
- 907: Three German armies led by Luitpold, Margrave of Bavaria, which entered the Hungarian territory in order to expel the Hungarians from the Carpathian Basin, are annihilated by the Hungarian army at the Battle of Pressburg.
- 910: Petar of Serbia, prince of Serbia, baptised a Christian.
- Foundation of Cluny, first federated monastic order.
- Emperor Simeon the Great solidifies the First Bulgarian Empire as one of the most powerful states in Europe.
- Incursions of Magyar (Hungarian) cavalry throughout Western Europe (47 expeditions in Germany, Italy and France, 899–970).
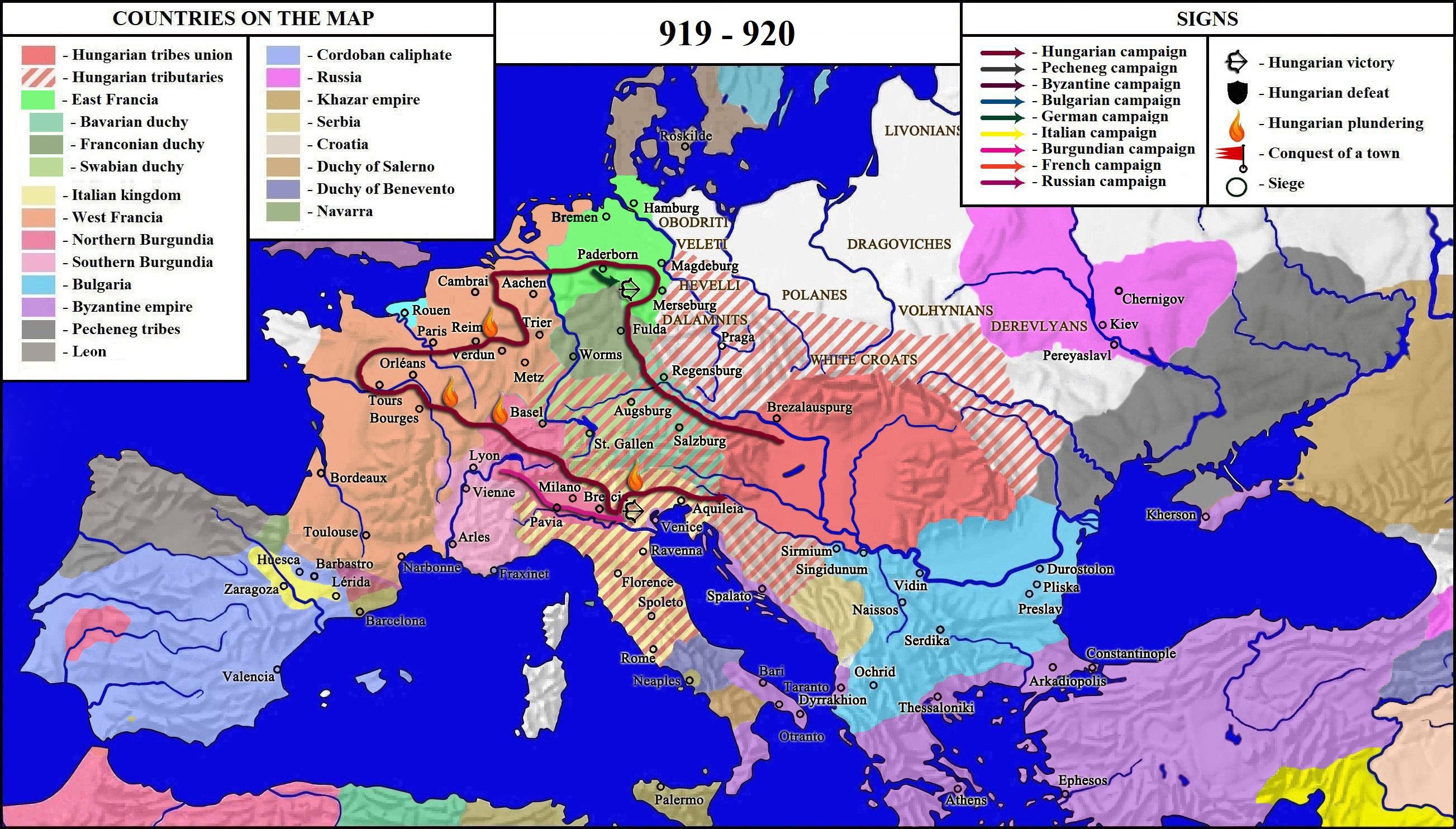
  The Hungarian campaign in Europe of 919–920
- Collapse of Great Moravia.
- Lions become extinct in Europe by this date, with the last dying in Caucasus.
- 907: Loire Vikings overrun Brittany; Breton court flees to the England of Edward the Elder.
- 911: The Viking Rollo granted County of Rouen by France: official foundation of Normandy.
- 917: (20 August 917) the Bulgarians destroyed the Byzantine army in the Battle of Anchialus, one of the bloodiest battles in the Middle Ages.
- 926: Časlav, prince of Serbia, restored Serbian independence and Serbian state becomes a unified princedom, united several Serbian lands, including Raška, Bosnia, Travunia, Zahumlje, and parts of the Adriatic hinterland.
- 927: official recognition of an independent national Church in Europe, the Bulgarian Patriarchate.
  Political divisions within England, 10th century.
- 927: Kingdom of England becomes a unified state.
- c. 936: Gorm the Old becomes the first recognized king of Denmark, and thus the Danish Monarchy is founded.
- 936: Alan II, with support from Æthelstan, commences the reconquest of Brittany.
- 955: The Battle of Lechfeld (10 August 955) sees a decisive victory for Otto I the Great, King of the Germans, over the Hungarian harka Bulcsú and the chieftains Lél (Lehel) and Súr.
- 966: Mieszko I, first duke of Poland, baptised a Christian.
- 968: Battle of Silistra between Kievan Rus and Bulgars.
- 985–986: The Norseman Erik the Red begins the colonisation of Greenland.
- 925: The medieval Croatian state becomes a unified kingdom under King Tomislav
- 988: Vladimir I, Prince of Kievan Rus', baptised a Christian
- c. 1000: Establishment of the Eastern Settlement and Western Settlement in Greenland.
- 1000: Sweyn Forkbeard conquers Norway.
- Second half of the 10th century: Page with David the Psalmist, from the Paris Psalter, is made. It is now kept at Bibliothéque Nationale, Paris.
- Late 10th or early 11th century: The Archangel Michael icon, is made. It is now kept at the Treasury of the Cathedral of Saint Mark, Venice.

=== Oceania ===
- c. 950: Formation of the Tu'i Tonga Empire and of the Tuʻi Tonga dynasty in Tonga.

== Inventions, discoveries, introductions ==
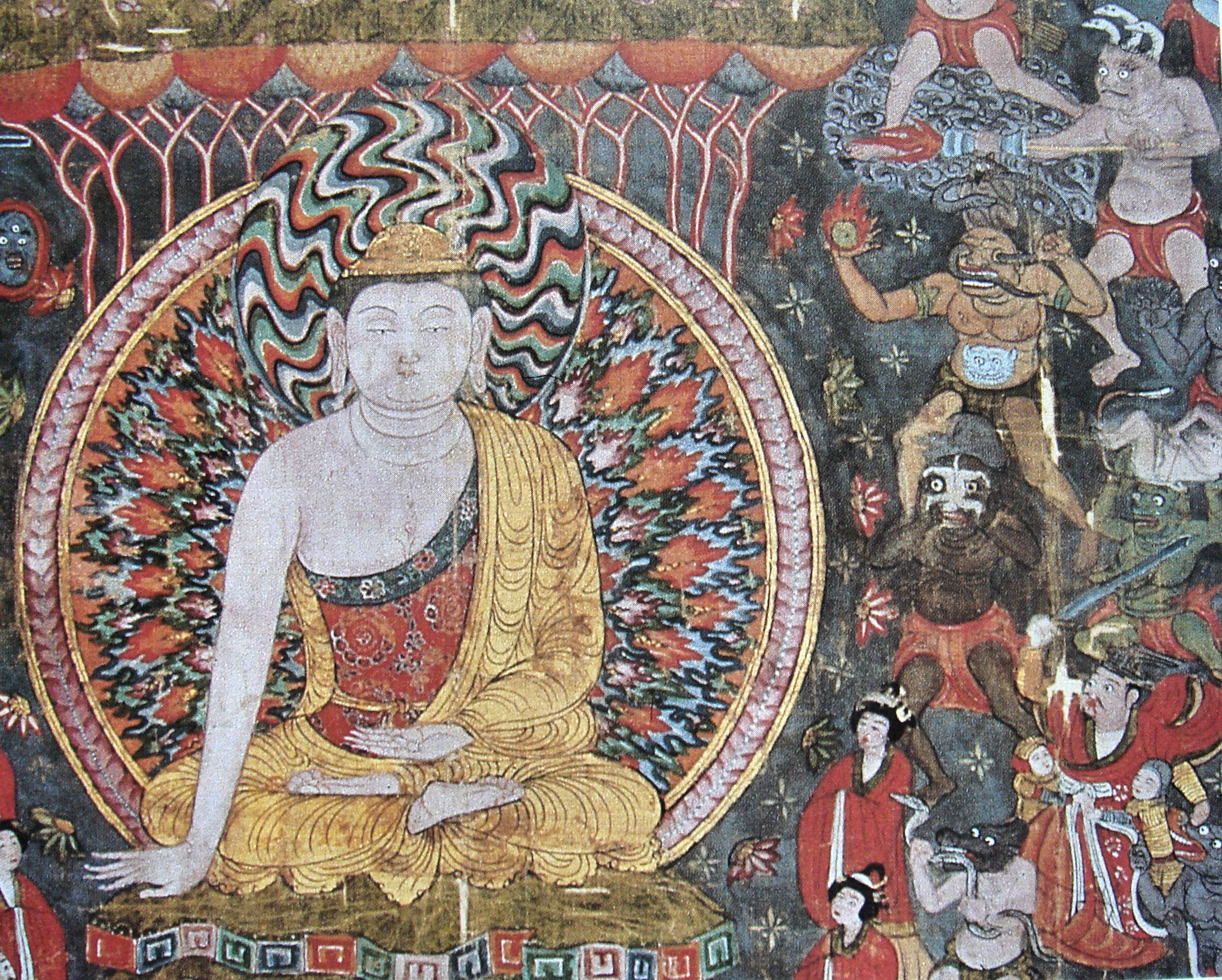
Earliest known representation of a gun (a fire lance) and a grenade (upper right), from the cave murals of Dunhuang, China, 10th century.

- 10th century–12th century: Seated Guaryin Bodhisattva, is made during the Liao dynasty. It is now kept at The Nelson-Atkins Museum of Art, Kansas City, Missouri.
- Construction begins on the Brihadeeswarar Temple of India, during the reign of Rajaraja Chola I.
- The Chinese engineer Qiao Weiyo invents the first pound lock, improving the canal lock system.
- The Chinese invent fire arrows.
- Earliest known occurrence in Mexico of Lost-wax casting.
- Three of the Four Great Books of Song are published (the last one in 1013), which were enormous Chinese encyclopedias having millions of written Chinese characters each.
- Hops first mentioned in connection with beer brewing.
- Zhang Sixun of China uses liquid mercury instead of water to power the escapement mechanism rotating an armillary sphere for the first time, because liquid mercury does not freeze easily like water during winter and does not rust metal parts.
