= Li Sigong =

Warlord and official in Tang dynasty

Li Sigong (Chinese: 李思恭; d. 886?), né Tuoba Sigong (拓跋思恭), noble title Duke of Xia (夏國公), was an ethnic Tangut warlord and government official of China's Tang dynasty. For his contributions in fighting against the rebel Huang Chao, he was appointed as the military governor of Dingnan Circuit (headquartered in modern-day Yulin, Shaanxi). The position was hereditary and passed down through his family. This laid the foundation for the future Western Xia dynasty.

== Background ==
It is not known when Tuoba Sigong was born. His family was of Tangut stock from the Pingxia (平夏) branch. Late in the Xiantong (咸通) era (861–874) of Emperor Yizong, he seized control of You Prefecture (宥州, in modern Ordos, Inner Mongolia), which had been established by the Tang imperial government to govern the Tangut, and claimed the title of prefect.

== Campaign against Huang Chao ==
Around new year 881, during the reign of Emperor Xizong, the major agrarian rebel Huang Chao attacked and captured the Tang imperial capital Chang'an, forcing Emperor Xizong to flee to Chengdu. Huang established a new state of Qi as its emperor. A number of Tang generals near Chang'an gathered their troops to prepare to attack Huang to recapture Chang'an. Tuoba Sigong gathered his own troops and went to Fu Prefecture (鄜州, in modern Yan'an, Shaanxi) to rendezvous with Li Xiaochang (李孝昌) the military governor of Fuyan Circuit (鄜延, headquartered at Fu Prefecture). They swore an oath to attack Huang, and subsequently advanced south toward Chang'an. In light of Tuoba Sigong's display of loyalty, Emperor Xizong made him the acting military governor of Xiasui Circuit (夏綏).

Subsequently, with Tang forces gathered around Chang'an, Huang abandoned Chang'an. The forces under the Tang generals Tang Hongfu (唐弘夫), Cheng Zongchu (程宗楚), and Wang Chucun entered the city, but did not notify Tuoba, Li Xiaochang, or Zheng Tian the military governor of Fengxiang Circuit (鳳翔, headquartered in modern Baoji, Shaanxi). The Tang forces that entered the city became bogged down in pillaging the city, and Qi forces counterattacked, crushing them and recapturing Chang'an. Subsequently, Qi forces engaged those under Tuoba and Li Xiaochang at Wangqiao (王橋, in modern Xianyang, Shaanxi), defeating them. Tuoba and Li Xiaochang nevertheless stayed in the area, and Huang sent his general Zhu Wen to defend against them. Soon thereafter, Emperor Xizong made Tuoba full military governor and renamed his circuit Dingnan Circuit (meaning, "those who stopped disaster"). Tuoba and Li Xiaogong then engaged Zhu and the major Qi general Shang Rang, but could not prevail, and withdrew. Subsequently, Tuoba was also made the acting mayor of Jingzhao Municipality (京兆, i.e., the Chang'an region). However, the extent of his participation in the subsequent Tang victory over Huang is not known—although the Song dynasty work the New History of the Five Dynasties, which referred to him as Tuoba Sijing in the biographies of the Five Dynasties and Ten Kingdoms period military governors of Dingnan Circuit, for reasons unclear, had the semi-laudatory, semi-derogatory explanation that because Tuoba had neither great accomplishments nor rebellious acts against the imperial government, his deeds went largely unrecorded. After Huang was destroyed, Tuoba was created the Duke of Xia, and given the imperial surname of Li. At some point, he also apparently seized Fuyan Circuit, an act that later was referred to by Li Keyong the military governor of Hedong (河東, headquartered in modern Taiyuan, Shanxi).

== Death ==
In 886, after Emperor Xizong fled to Xingyuan (興元, in modern Hanzhong, Shaanxi) due to a major dispute between the powerful eunuch Tian Lingzi (who controlled Emperor Xizong's court) and Li Keyong and Wang Chongrong the military governor of Hezhong Circuit (河中, headquartered in modern Yuncheng, Shanxi), Tian's erstwhile ally Zhu Mei the military governor of Jingnan Circuit (靜難, headquartered in modern Xianyang) declared Emperor Xizong's distant relative Li Yun the Prince of Xiang the new emperor. Emperor Xizong ordered Li Sigong to attack Zhu. Before Li Sigong could launch his troops, however, he died. Emperor Xizong gave Li Sigong's younger brothers Li Sijian Dingnan Circuit and Li Sixiao (李思孝) Baoda Circuit (保大, i.e., Fuyan). Li Sijian's successor Li Yichang might have been Li Sigong's son—the traditional sources differ as to whether he was Li Sijian's son or Li Sigong's son.

== Personal Information ==
- Children
  - Li Renyou (李仁祐), died early, father of Li Yichang
  - Li Renfu (李仁福) (died 933), Later become the military governor of Dingnan Circuit

== Notes and references ==
- New Book of Tang, vol. 221, part 1.
- Zizhi Tongjian, vol. 254.
