= 933 =

Calendar year

933 in various calendars
- Gregorian calendar: 933; CMXXXIII
- Ab urbe condita: 1686
- Armenian calendar: 382; ԹՎ ՅՁԲ
- Assyrian calendar: 5683
- Balinese saka calendar: 854–855
- Bengali calendar: 339–340
- Berber calendar: 1883
- Buddhist calendar: 1477
- Burmese calendar: 295
- Byzantine calendar: 6441–6442
- Chinese calendar: 壬辰年 (Water Dragon); 3630 or 3423 — to — 癸巳年 (Water Snake); 3631 or 3424
- Coptic calendar: 649–650
- Discordian calendar: 2099
- Ethiopian calendar: 925–926
- Hebrew calendar: 4693–4694
- Hindu calendars
- Vikram Samvat: 989–990
- Shaka Samvat: 854–855
- Kali Yuga: 4033–4034
- Holocene calendar: 10933
- Iranian calendar: 311–312
- Islamic calendar: 320–322
- Japanese calendar: Jōhei 3 (承平３年)
- Javanese calendar: 832–833
- Julian calendar: 933; CMXXXIII
- Korean calendar: 3266
- Minguo calendar: 979 before ROC 民前979年
- Nanakshahi calendar: −535
- Seleucid era: 1244/1245 AG
- Thai solar calendar: 1475–1476
- Tibetan calendar: ཆུ་ཕོ་འབྲུག་ལོ་ (male Water-Dragon); 1059 or 678 or −94 — to — ཆུ་མོ་སྦྲུལ་ལོ་ (female Water-Snake); 1060 or 679 or −93

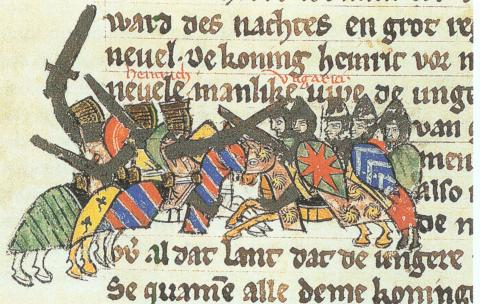
King Henry I defeats the Magyars (c. 1270)

Year 933 (CMXXXIII) was a common year starting on Tuesday of the Julian calendar.

== Events ==
=== By place ===
==== Europe ====
- Spring – Hugh of Provence, king of Italy, launches an expedition to Rome to remove the Roman ruler (princeps) Alberic II and avenge his humiliation (see 932). It fails, however, as Roman civic militias repel the Lombard army. Hugh ravages the Italian countryside, before he withdraws to Pavia.
- March 15 – Battle of Merseburg: King Henry I ("the Fowler") defeats the Magyars near Merseburg after his refusal to pay the annual tribute. During Henry's lifetime they never raid the East Frankish Kingdom again.
- William I ("Longsword"), duke of Normandy, recognises King Rudolph as his overlord. In turn he gives William the Cotentin Peninsula and the Channel Islands.

==== England ====
- Prince Edwin, the youngest son of the late King Edward the Elder, is drowned en route to the West Frankish Kingdom and buried at Saint-Bertin.

==== Africa ====
- Fatimid forces fail to seize the Maghreb al-Aqsa (modern Morocco) from the local Berber tribes allied to the Iberia-based Caliphate of Córdoba.

== Births ==
- Al-Hakim Nishapuri, Persian Sunni scholar (d. 1014)

== Deaths ==
- March 10 – Li Renfu, Chinese warlord and governor
- March 16 – Takin al-Khazari, Abbasid governor of Egypt
- November 21 – Al-Tahawi, Arab imam and scholar (b. 853)
- December 9 – Li Congrong, prince of Later Tang
- December 15 – Li Siyuan, emperor of Later Tang (b. 867)
- December 18 – Yaonian Yanmujin, Chinese empress dowager
- Acfred II, count of Carcassonne and Razès (France)
- Adelolf, count of Boulogne (approximate date)
- Alfonso IV, king of León and Galicia (Spain)
- Du Guangting, Chinese Taoist priest and writer (b. 850)
- Ealdred I, ruler ('king') of Bernicia (approximate date)
- Edwin, English prince and son of Edward the Elder
- Fujiwara no Kanesuke, Japanese nobleman (b. 877)
- Harald Fairhair, king of Norway (approximate date)
- Ibn Duraid, Arab poet and philologist (b. 837)
- Mu'nis al-Muzaffar, Abbasid general
- Shaghab, mother and de facto co-ruler of Al-Muqtadir
- Tryphon, patriarch of Constantinople
