= Li Yichang =

Warlord during the Five Dynasties and Ten Kingdoms period

Li Yichang (Chinese: 李彝昌; d. 909/910) was an ethnic Tangut warlord during the Five Dynasties and Ten Kingdoms period of China, ruling Dingnan Circuit (headquartered in modern-day Yulin, Shaanxi) from 908 to his death in 909 or 910, as its military governor (Jiedushi) in de facto independence.

== Biography ==
It is not known when Li Yichang was born. The traditional histories conflict on Li Yichang's relationship with his predecessor Li Sijian. The History of the Five Dynasties, the New History of the Five Dynasties, and the Zizhi Tongjian all indicated that he was Li Sijian's son. However, the History of Song indicated that he was the grandson of Li Sijian's predecessor and older brother Li Sigong.

In any case, when Li Sijian died in 908, Li Yichang claimed the title of acting military governor of Dingnan. Shortly after, Later Liang's emperor Zhu Quanzhong bestowed on him the title of full military governor.

Li Yichang's rule of Dingnan was short. In 909 or 910, his officer Gao Zongyi (高宗益) mutinied and killed him. The officers and soldiers of Dingnan then killed Gao and supported Li Renfu—a relative of Li Yichang's, one generation higher—as the new ruler of Dingnan. Li Renfu was thereafter made the new military governor by Zhu Quanzhong. (Li Yichang's death year was given as 909 by the History of the Five Dynasties and the New History of the Five Dynasties and 910 by the Zizhi Tongjian.)
