= Siege of Tripoli (975) =

Part of Syrian campaigns of John Tzimiskes

- Part of Syrian campaigns of John Tzimiskes and Byzantine–Arab wars
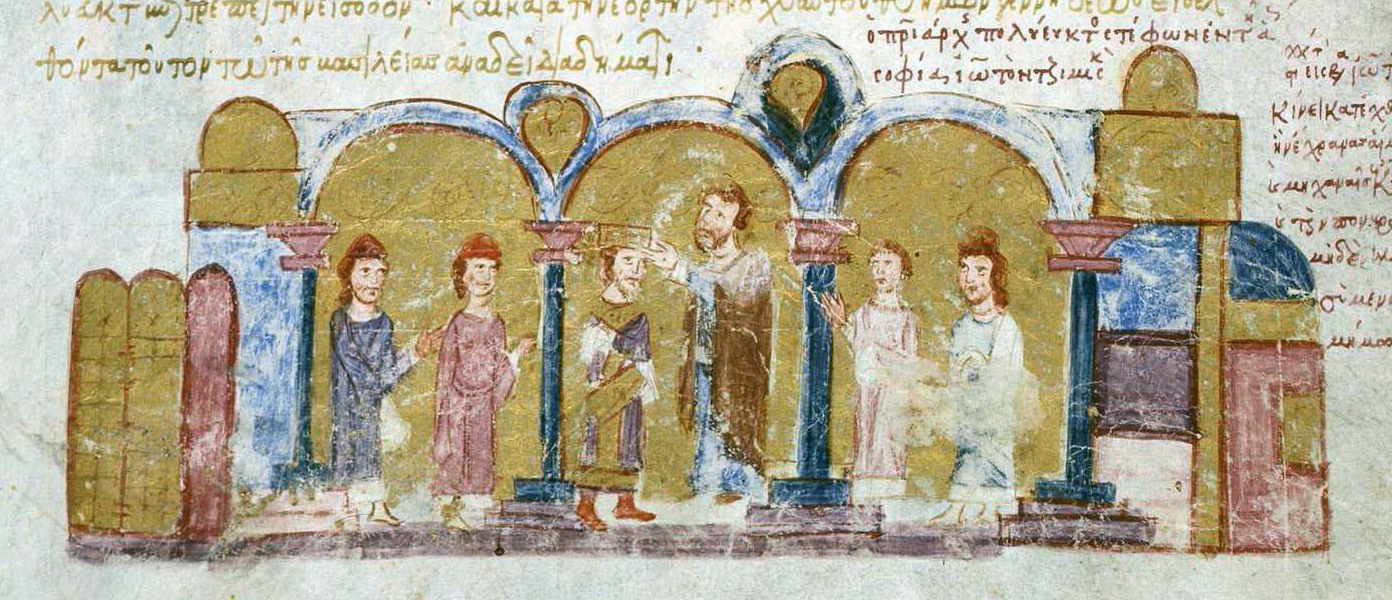
- Coronation of Emperor John I Tzimiskes to reign miniature from the Madrid Skylitzes.
Date	July – August 975
Location	Tripoli, Levant
Result	Fatimid victory

Belligerents
Byzantine Empire	Fatimid Caliphate

Commanders and leaders
John I Tzimiskes	al-Mu'izz li-Din Allah; Ryan Al-Khadim

Casualties and losses
Heavy	Unknown

The Siege of Tripoli in 975 was one of the most significant conflicts of its era. It was a key part of the military campaign led by the Byzantine Emperor John I Tzimiskes against the Fatimid Caliphate in the Levant.

In Western historical records, this famous expedition is widely known as the Crusade of John Tzimiskes.

== Background ==
In the late 10th century, the Levant was gripped by intense political instability under Fatimid rule. Capitalizing on this chaos, the Byzantine Empire began expanding southward. They took direct advantage of the severe weakness of the Fatimids, who were heavily distracted by local conflicts with rivals like the Qarmatians in the Arabian Peninsula and Aftakin in Damascus.

In 975, the Byzantine Emperor John I Tzimiskes launched a massive military expedition. His ultimate goals were to secure the Byzantine borders and reclaim Jerusalem. The imperial army swept through most of the Levant, and several key cities quickly surrendered and pledged their allegiance to him, including Damascus, Homs, Baalbek, Tiberias.

After securing the interior, the Emperor turned his army toward the Mediterranean coast to subdue its heavily fortified coastal cities. This path led him straight to Tripoli a vital stronghold still under Fatimid control where he surrounded the city and began his historic siege.

== The Siege ==
When Emperor John I Tzimiskes laid siege to the city, he never expected such fierce resistance or such formidable fortifications.

The siege dragged on for 40 days, yet the Byzantine forces could neither breach the walls nor force the city to surrender. Ultimately, unable to overcome Tripoli's powerful defense, the Emperor’s efforts ended in failure.

== Aftermath ==
Following his failure to breach Tripoli, and with autumn fast approaching after a prolonged siege, Emperor John I Tzimiskes decided to retreat northward toward the capital Constantinople by way of Antioch. On their way back, the Byzantines shifted their focus to subduing less fortified strongholds in the Qalamoun and Jabal Al-Ansariyah regions. To secure the borders of the Byzantine Duchy of Antioch, they successfully took control of several key forts including Barzuya, Sahyun, Jableh, Baniyas.

Shortly after his return, Emperor John Tzimiskes passed away in January 976, bringing a temporary halt to major Byzantine military campaigns in the region.
