= 936 =

Calendar year

936 in various calendars
Gregorian calendar	936; CMXXXVI
Ab urbe condita	1689
Armenian calendar	385; ԹՎ ՅՁԵ
Assyrian calendar	5686
Balinese saka calendar	857–858
Bengali calendar	342–343
Berber calendar	1886
Buddhist calendar	1480
Burmese calendar	298
Byzantine calendar	6444–6445
Chinese calendar	乙未年 (Wood Goat); 3633 or 3426 — to — 丙申年 (Fire Monkey); 3634 or 3427
Coptic calendar	652–653
Discordian calendar	2102
Ethiopian calendar	928–929
Hebrew calendar	4696–4697
- Hindu calendars
Vikram Samvat	992–993
Shaka Samvat	857–858
Kali Yuga	4036–4037
Holocene calendar	10936
Iranian calendar	314–315
Islamic calendar	324–325
Japanese calendar	Jōhei 6 (承平６年)
Javanese calendar	835–837
Julian calendar	936; CMXXXVI
Korean calendar	3269
Minguo calendar	976 before ROC 民前976年
Nanakshahi calendar	−532
Seleucid era	1247/1248 AG
Thai solar calendar	1478–1479
Tibetan calendar	ཤིང་མོ་ལུག་ལོ་ (female Wood-Sheep); 1062 or 681 or −91 — to — མེ་ཕོ་སྤྲེ་ལོ་ (male Fire-Monkey); 1063 or 682 or −90

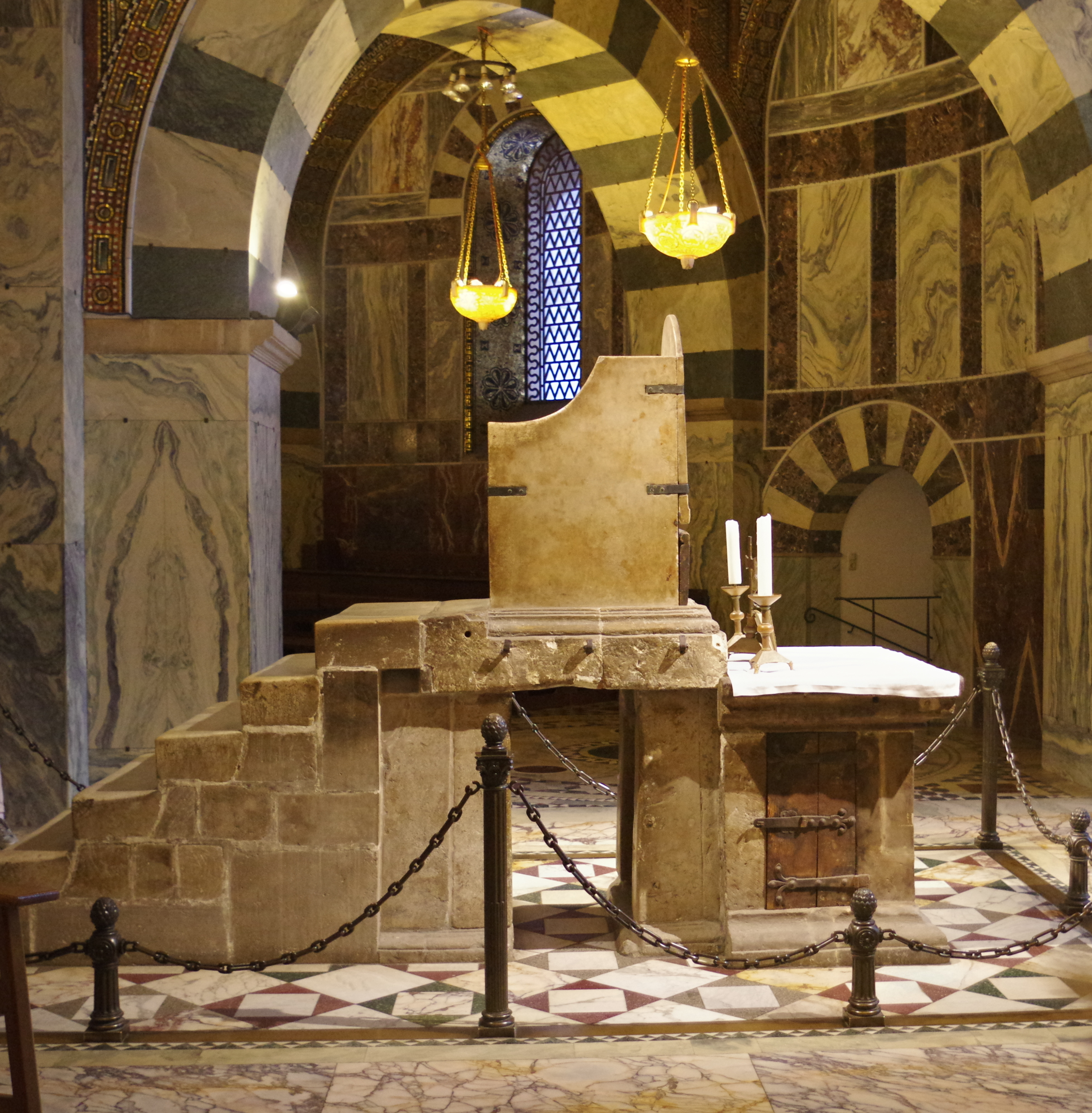
Otto I is crowned king at Aachen Cathedral

Year 936 (CMXXXVI) was a leap year starting on Friday of the Julian calendar.

== Events ==
=== By place ===
==== Europe ====
- June 19 – At Laon, Louis IV, the 14-year old son of the late King Charles the Simple, is crowned King of West Francia after being recalled from Wessex by Hugh the Great, count of Paris. Hugh, whose father, King Robert I, was killed in battle near Soissons in 923, is given the title Duke of the Franks and becomes the second most powerful man in the West Frankish Kingdom. The crowning of Louis IV follows the death of King Rudolph I at Auxerre earlier in the year.
- Summer – Hugh of Provence, king of Italy, dispatches his son and co-ruler Lothair II with a third expedition to Rome to dislodge Alberic II. Assault after assault is repulsed by the Roman civic militia. At length, weakened by an epidemic, the Lombard nobles press on Hugh to accept a peace treaty mediated by Odo of Cluny.
- July 2 – King Henry I ("the Fowler") dies at his royal palace in Memleben, Thuringia, after a 17-year reign. He is succeeded by his 23-year-old son Otto I, who is married to Eadgyth, a daughter of the late King Edward the Elder. Otto is the first German king to be crowned in Charlemagne's former capital of Aachen.
- A Hungarian army invades Franconia and occupies Fulda. They are attacked by East Frankish forces and forced to go westwards. Otto I moves against the rebellious Elbe Slavs.
- Archbishop Unni of Hamburg-Bremen visits the king of Denmark Gorm and the king of the Swedes Ring before he dies in Birka.

==== England ====
- King Æthelstan sets the border between the Kingdom of England and Cornwall as the east bank of the River Tamar.

==== Africa ====
- Spring – Muhammad ibn Tughj al-Ikhshid, ruler of Egypt and Syria, defeats the Fatimid forces near Alexandria. He drives them out of the city, forcing the Fatimids to retreat from Egypt to their base at Cyrenaica.

==== Arabian Empire ====
- Summer – Ibn Muqla, an Abbasid official and vizier, is disgraced after his failed campaign against Muhammad ibn Ra'iq, the rebellious governor of Wasit. He is arrested and imprisoned in Baghdad.

==== China ====
- November 28 – Shi Jingtang is enthroned as the first emperor of the Later Jin by Tai Zong, ruler of the Khitan-led Liao Dynasty, following a revolt against his rival, emperor Fei of Later Tang.

=== By topic ===
==== Religion ====
- January 3 – Pope Leo VII succeeds John XI (who died the previous year) as the 126th pope of the Catholic Church.

== Births ==
- September 24 – 'Adud al-Dawla, ruler of the Buyid Dynasty (d. 983)
- Abu al-Qasim al-Zahrawi, Muslim physician and surgeon (d. 1013)
- Gunnor, duchess consort of Normandy (approximate date)
- Zhou ("the Elder"), queen consort of Southern Tang (approximate date)

== Deaths ==
- February 13 – Xiao Wen, empress of the Liao Dynasty
- July 2 – Henry the Fowler, king of the East Frankish Kingdom
- July 5 – Xu Ji, official and chancellor of Former Shu
- September 17 – Unni, archbishop of Hamburg-Bremen
- September 27 – Kyŏn Hwŏn, king of Later Baekje (b. 867)
- December 25 – Zhang Jingda, general of Later Tang
- Abu Bakr ibn Mujāhid, Muslim canonical reader and scholar
- Abu al-Hasan al-Ash'ari, Muslim Shafi'i scholar (b. 874)
- Al-Muntakhab al-Hasan, ruler of the Rassid Dynasty
- Andrew of Constantinople, Byzantine saint
- Gagik I of Vaspurakan, Armenian king (or 943)
- Ibn al-Mughallis, Muslim theologian and jurist
- Murchadh mac Sochlachan, king of Uí Maine (Ireland)
- Rudolph I, king of the West Frankish Kingdom
- Dandi Mahadevi, Indian queen regnant
