= Banu Isam =

Banu Isam بنو عصام
- 9th century–931
- Capital: Ceuta
- Ethnic groups: Majakasa Berbers
- Religion: Islam
- Emir
  - ?-?: Majakasa
  - ?-931: Al-Rida ibn Isam
- History
  - Established: 9th century
  - Disestablished: 931
Succeeded by
Umayyad state of Córdoba

The Banu Isam were a Berber Muslim dynasty that ruled Ceuta, present-day Spain.

== History ==
Ceuta had been destroyed and sacked during the Berber Revolt in 740, and was lying waste; then, sometime in the middle of the 9th century, Majakas, chief of the Berber Majkasa tribe, resettled it and founded a dynasty. Majakas was succeeded by his son Isam, of whom the dynasty is named after; Isam ruled for a long time. After Isam died, he was succeeded by his son Mujir, who was then succeeded by his brother al-Rida. al-Rida pledged allegiance to the Idrisids. Ceuta was besieged in 931 by an Umayyad fleet led by Najah ibn Ghufayr, and al-Rida ended up yielding and handing the city, thus ending the Banu Isam.

== List of Emirs ==
- Majakasa (Middle of the 9th century-?)
- Isam (?-?)
- Mujir ibn Isam (?-?)
- Al-Rida ibn Isam (?-931)

== See also ==
- History of Ceuta
