= Muhammad ibn Ja'far al-Khara'iti =

- محمد بن جعفر الخرائطي
- Born: 854; Samarra, Abbasid Caliphate
- Died: 938; Jaffa or Asqalan, Abbasid Caliphate
- Occupations: Theologian, Writer
- Writing career
- Language: Arabic
- Period: Islamic Golden Age
- Genres: Theology, Literature
- Notable work: I'tilal al-qulub (The Malady of Hearts)

Muhammad ibn Ja'far al-Khara'iti (Arabic: محمد بن جعفر الخرائطي) (died 327 AH/938 CE) was a Muslim theologian and the author of I'tilal al-qulub (The Malady of Hearts), the earliest book on love in the Islamic world. He was born in Samarra, moved to live in Syria and died in Jaffa or Asqalan.
