= 867 =

Calendar year

867 in various calendars
- Gregorian calendar: 867; DCCCLXVII
- Ab urbe condita: 1620
- Armenian calendar: 316; ԹՎ ՅԺԶ
- Assyrian calendar: 5617
- Balinese saka calendar: 788–789
- Bengali calendar: 273–274
- Berber calendar: 1817
- Buddhist calendar: 1411
- Burmese calendar: 229
- Byzantine calendar: 6375–6376
- Chinese calendar: 丙戌年 (Fire Dog); 3564 or 3357 — to — 丁亥年 (Fire Pig); 3565 or 3358
- Coptic calendar: 583–584
- Discordian calendar: 2033
- Ethiopian calendar: 859–860
- Hebrew calendar: 4627–4628
- Hindu calendars
- Vikram Samvat: 923–924
- Shaka Samvat: 788–789
- Kali Yuga: 3967–3968
- Holocene calendar: 10867
- Iranian calendar: 245–246
- Islamic calendar: 252–253
- Japanese calendar: Jōgan 9 (貞観９年)
- Javanese calendar: 764–765
- Julian calendar: 867; DCCCLXVII
- Korean calendar: 3200
- Minguo calendar: 1045 before ROC 民前1045年
- Nanakshahi calendar: −601
- Seleucid era: 1178/1179 AG
- Thai solar calendar: 1409–1410
- Tibetan calendar: མེ་ཕོ་ཁྱི་ལོ་ (male Fire-Dog); 993 or 612 or −160 — to — མེ་མོ་ཕག་ལོ་ (female Fire-Boar); 994 or 613 or −159

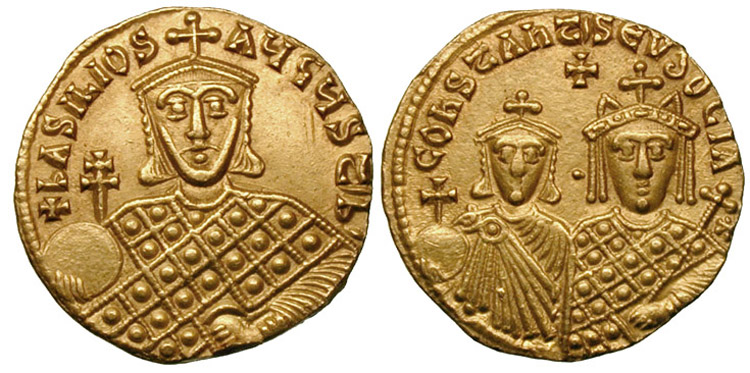
Emperor Basil I (left) with Eudokia and his son Constantine (from his first marriage)

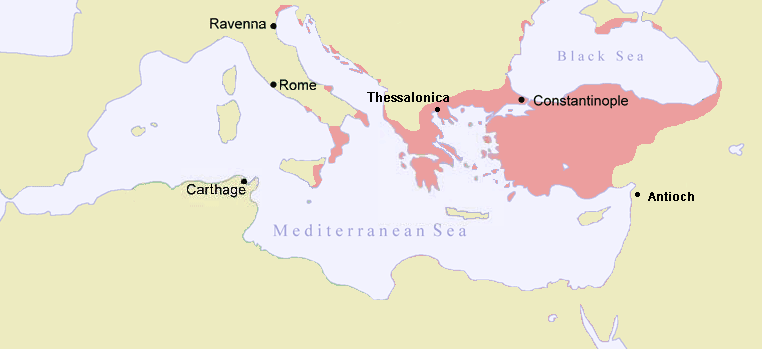
The Byzantine Empire (around 867 AD)

Year 867 (DCCCLXVII) was a common year starting on Wednesday of the Julian calendar.

== Events ==
=== By place ===
==== Byzantine Empire ====
- September 24 – Emperor Michael III is murdered, by order of his co-emperor Basil I. Basil becomes sole ruler (basileus) of the Byzantine Empire, and founds the Macedonian Dynasty (until 1056). Basil rebuilds the Byzantine army and navy, in an effort to restore the empire.

==== Europe ====
- August – Treaty of Compiègne: King Charles the Bald cedes the Cotentin Peninsula to Salomon, duke ('king') of Brittany, after he had sent his son-in-law Pascweten to negotiate a peace. Charles orders the fortification of the cities of Tours, Le Mans and Compiègne.
- Bořivoj I declares himself duke (knyaz) of Bohemia, and founds the Přemyslid Dynasty (approximate date).

==== Britain ====
- Vikings or "Danes" (the two terms were often used interchangeably at the time), comprising the Great Heathen Army, advance northward from bases in the Kingdom of East Anglia, into the Anglo-Saxon Kingdom of Northumbria.
  - Deira, the southernmost part of Northumbria, is conquered by the Vikings. Ivar the Boneless, one of their leaders, installs a puppet king of Northumbria, Ecgberht I.
  - The rival monarchs of Northumbria, Ælla and Osberht, join forces in an attempt to expel the Great Heathen Army, but are defeated in battle by Ivar the Boneless and Halfdan Ragnarsson. Osberht is killed in battle, while Ælla is reportedly captured, before being subject to the blood eagle: a combined method of torture and execution.
  - Surviving members of the Northumbrian royal court flee into the northernmost part of the kingdom, Bernicia.

=== By topic ===
==== Religion ====
- The Council of Constantinople is held (presided over by Patriarch Photius), which anathematizes the use of the Filioque clause in the Creed, and also Pope Nicholas I, for his attacks on the work of Greek missionaries in Bulgaria.
- September – Photius I ("the Great"), patriarch of Constantinople, is removed from office and banished. Ignatius is reinstated as patriarch by Basil I.
- November 13 – Pope Nicholas I dies after a 9-year reign. He is succeeded by Adrian II (also referred to as Hadrian II), as the 106th pope of Rome.

== Births ==
- October 10 – Li Siyuan, emperor of Later Tang (d. 933)
- Kyŏn Hwŏn, king of Later Baekje (Korea) (d. 936)
- Pribislav, prince (knyaz) of Serbia (approximate date)
- Stephen I, patriarch of Constantinople (d. 893)
- Zhao Zong, emperor of the Tang Dynasty (d. 904)
- Zhu Jin, Chinese warlord (d. 918)

== Deaths ==
- March 21 – Ælla, king of Northumbria
- March 21 – Osberht, king of Northumbria
- November 13 – Nicholas I, pope of the Catholic Church
- Auisle, Viking leader (approximate date)
- Cormac mac Connmhach, Irish monk and scribe
- Donnchad mac Aedacain, king of Uisneach (Ireland)
- Eahlstan, bishop of Sherborne
- Fujiwara no Yoshimi, Japanese nobleman (b. 813)
- Fujiwara no Yoshisuke, Japanese statesman (b. 813)
- Galindo Aznárez I, count of Aragon
- Gottschalk of Orbais, German monk and theologian
- Lazarus Zographos, Byzantine monk and painter
- Louis, Frankish archchancellor and abbot
- Michael III, emperor of the Byzantine Empire (b. 840)
- Muhammad ibn Abdallah, Abbasid governor
- Qarin I, ruler (spahbed) of the Bavand Dynasty
- Wasif al-Turki, Abbasid general
- Wulfsige, bishop of Lichfield
