= Li Renfu =

Warlord during the Five Dynasties and Ten Kingdoms period

Li Renfu (Chinese: 李仁福; died March 10, 933), possibly né Tuoba Renfu (拓跋仁福), noble title Prince of Guo (虢王), was an ethnic Tangut warlord during the Five Dynasties and Ten Kingdoms period of China, ruling Dingnan Circuit (headquartered in modern-day Yulin, Shaanxi) from 909 or 910 to his death in 933, as its military governor (jiedushi) in de facto independence.

== Background ==
Li Renfu was said to be from the same Tuoba clan as the late-Tang dynasty warlord Li Sigong (né Tuoba Sigong), the first Dangxiang military governor of Dingnan, and therefore was ethnically Dangxiang. His relationship to Li Sigong was not clear from the traditional Chinese sources—the Old History of the Five Dynasties indicated that he also took the Tang dynasty imperial clan surname of Li when Li Sigong was granted that surname for his contribution in Tang's defeat of the major agrarian rebel Huang Chao, but did not otherwise specify their relationship; the New History of the Five Dynasties indicated a lack of knowledge, on the part of its editors, as to their relationship; while the Zizhi Tongjian indicated that he was a cousin of Li Yichang, who succeeded Li Sigong's younger brother and successor Li Sijian, but whose relationship to Li Sigong was somewhat uncertain as well as different sources differed as to their relationship. (The description in the History of Song of Li Renfu as being one generation below Li Yichang appeared to be clearly erroneous given that Li Renfu's sons also used the generational character of "Yi" in their names.)

In any case, Li Renfu served as an officer at Dingnan, and as of the time of Li Yichang's rule of the circuit was serving as the commander of both the Han and non-Han soldiers at the circuit. In 910 (according to the Zizhi Tongjian) or 909 (according to the Old History of the Five Dynasties and the New History of the Five Dynasties) Li Yichang was assassinated by his officer Gao Zongyi (高宗益). The Dingnan officers killed Gao and supported Li Renfu to succeed Li Yichang. When Li Renfu reported this to Zhu Quanzhong, the emperor of Tang's successor state Later Liang, Zhu gave Li Renfu the title of military governor of Dingnan.

== Rule as military governor ==
=== During Later Liang ===
Later in 910, Li Maozhen the Prince of Qi—one of the rival states to Later Liang—as well as two military governors under him, Li Jihui the military governor of Jingnan Circuit (靜難, headquartered in modern Xianyang, Shaanxi) and Liu Zhijun the military governor of Zhangyi Circuit (彰義, headquartered in modern Pingliang, Gansu)—sent emissaries to Li Cunxu, the Prince of Jin (another rival state to Later Liang), suggesting that they attack Dingnan together. Li Cunxu sent his general Zhou Dewei to join the Qi forces. The two armies put Dingnan's capital Xia Prefecture (夏州, in modern Yulin, Shaanxi) under siege. Li Renfu sought aid from the Later Liang imperial government, and Zhu Quanzhong sent the generals Li Yu (李遇) and Liu Wan (劉綰) to aid Li Renfu. When Li and Liu reached Xia, the Qi and Jin forces lifted their siege and withdrew. For his holding out against Qi and Jin, Zhu bestowed on Li Renfu the titles of acting Taibao (太保) and honorary chancellor (同中書門下平章事, Tong Zhongshu Menxia Pingzhangshi).

=== During Later Tang ===
Eventually, Later Liang was destroyed by Li Cunxu, who claimed imperial title as emperor of a new Later Tang. It was said that by the time of Li Cunxu's reign as emperor, Li Renfu had received, accumulatively, from Zhu Quanzhong's son and successor Zhu Zhen and Li Cunxu, the titles of acting Taishi (太師), the greater honorary chancellor title Zhongshu Ling (中書令), and Prince of Shuofang. It was said that throughout the years, it became perceived at the Later Tang court that Li Renfu was in secret communications with Later Tang's northern rival Khitan Empire. (However, after Li Renfu's death, it was reported by some persons who claimed to know Li Renfu's thinking process that Li Renfu was merely creating such rumors to discourage the Later Tang court from considering moving him to another circuit.)

Li Renfu died in 933, and was posthumously created the Prince of Guo by Li Cunxu's adoptive brother and successor Li Siyuan. Li Siyuan subsequently, believing the rumors of Li Renfu's secret communications with Khitan Empire, tried to move Li Renfu's son and successor Li Yichao to nearby Zhangwu Circuit (彰武, headquartered in modern Yan'an, Shaanxi) while moving Zhangwu's military governor An Congjin to Dingnan. The attempt failed, and Li Renfu's family would become entrenched at Dingnan for the rest of the Five Dynasties and Ten Kingdoms period.

== Notes and references ==
- Old History of the Five Dynasties, vol. 132.
- New History of the Five Dynasties, vol. 40.
- Zizhi Tongjian, vols. 267, 278.
