= Battle of Andernach =

Battle of Andernach may refer to:

- Battle of Andernach (876), between Charles the Bald and Louis the Younger
- Battle of Andernach (939), between the Kingdom of Germany and the duchies of Lotharingia and Franconia
