= Gebeachan =

Tenth-century King of the Isles

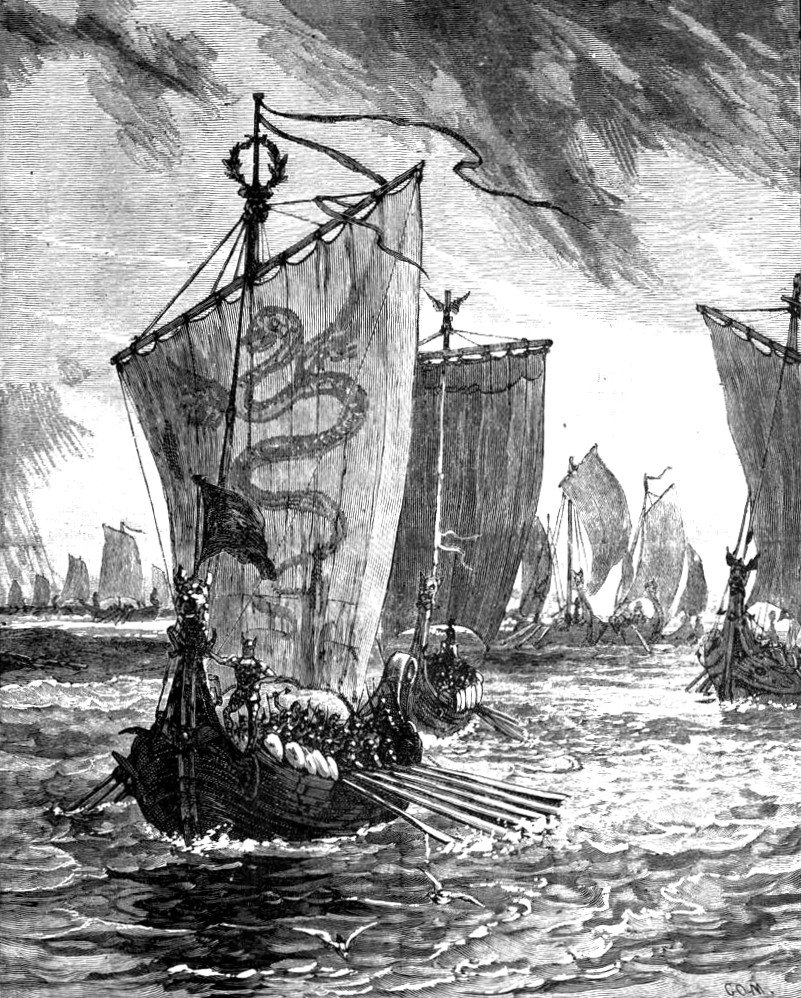
An early twentieth-century depiction of Amlaíb mac Gofraid campaigning against the English in 937.

Gebeachan (died 937), also known as Gébennach, and Gebechán, was a tenth-century King of the Isles. He seems to have been a subordinate to Amlaíb mac Gofraid, King of Dublin, and is recorded to have fought and died at the Battle of Brunanburh in 937.

== Career ==
Gebeachan was slain in 937 at the Battle of Brunanburh, a remarkably bloody affair fought by Æðelstan, King of the English on one side, and Amlaíb mac Gofraid, King of Dublin, Custantín mac Áeda, King of Alba, and Owain ap Dyfnwal, King of Strathclyde on the other. According to a poem preserved by the ninth to twelfth-century Anglo-Saxon Chronicle, Æðelstan's opponents suffered greatly, with five kings, seven earls, and "countless of the raiding-army of Seamen and Scots" amongst their dead. As for Gebeachan, his fall in this conflict is attested by a single source, a seventeenth-century translation of the now lost Annals of Clonmacnoise. The original translator of this source, Conall Mac Eochagáin, is known to have incorporated his own comments and material into his translation. Since the original version no longer exists, it is uncertain what information is accurately interpreted and what originates from Mac Eochagáin himself. Nevertheless, this source styles Gebeachan "king of the Islands", a royal title that appears to be a translated form of the Gaelic rí Innse Gall, and is otherwise first recorded in 989.

"Gebeachan", the name that the Annals of Clonmacnoise ascribes to him, seems to represent either the Gaelic Gebechán, Giblechán, or Gébennach (the latter two attested by the fifteenth- to sixteenth-century Annals of Ulster in 890 and 973 respectively). Another possibility is that the name is derived from gebech, a word for a type of craftsman. Alternately, Gebeachan's name could be derived from a nickname referring to fetters or bondages. Whatever the case, the name is clearly Gaelic, which indicates that Gebeachan was unlikely to have been from Orkney, and more probably centred in the southern Hebrides.

There is reason to suspect that Gebeachan may have been a subordinate of Amlaíb, a monarch styled "king of the Irish and the many islands" by the twelfth-century Chronicon ex chronicis. If so, Gebeachan's obituary would be evidence of Uí Ímair authority in the Isles in the 930s and 940s. In fact, Gebeachan's attested title suggests that he was one of the five reguli, noted by the Chronicon ex chronicis, who are stated to have fallen supporting Amlaíb at Brunanburh. Amlaíb himself died in 941. In an entry following his death, the twelfth-century Chronicon Scotorum records that Muirchertach mac Néill, King of Ailech raided "the Isles of Alba" in an annal-entry that seems to refer to the southern Hebrides. This notice may have bearing on Gebeachan's apparent cooperation with Amlaíb, and appears to show that opponents of the Uí Ímair seized the initiative on his death.

Also in 941, the seventeenth-century Annals of the Four Masters reports that a chieftain named Áed Albanach was slain amongst a vast host of Dublin Vikings by the invading forces of Amargein mac Cináeda, overking of Uí Failge. The fact that Áed bore a Gaelic personal name, died with the Dubliners, and bore an epithet referring to a Scotsman, could be evidence that he was a successor of Gebeachan. Further evidence of this may be the record of Mór, a woman attested by the twelfth-century pseudo-historical Caithréim Chellacháin Chaisil, which identifies her as a daughter of a certain Áed mac Echach, and describes her as the daughter of a King of the Hebrides.
