= Xue Wenjie =

Xue Wenjie (薛文傑) (died 934) was an official of the Chinese Five Dynasties and Ten Kingdoms Period state Min. He was a close associate of Min's emperor Wang Lin (Emperor Huizong), by flattering the emperor and finding creative, if cruel, methods to extract funds from the people for the emperor's use. In 934, the angry soldiers refused to fight troops of Min's invading rival Wu unless Xue were surrendered to them. After Xue was given to them, they killed him and ate his flesh.

== Coming to power ==
Historical records did not indicate when Xue Wenjie was born or what his geographical origins were. What it did indicate was that at one point, he became the commander of the middle army of Fujian (i.e., the state of Min). His personality was said to be dextrous and wicked. As then-Min emperor Wang Lin favored luxurious living, Xue ingratiated himself with the emperor by collecting much material goods for the emperor. Wang thus made him the director of budget (國計使, Guojishi) and closely associated with him.

It was said that the tactics Xue engaged to collect wealth for the emperor was this: he would secretly collect evidence of crimes committed by rich people in the populace; he would then arrest them and confiscate their wealth. This included pounding the arrestees on both their chests and backs, and using heated copper to burn them. In 933, there was a time when a powerful local man of Jian Prefecture (建州, in modern Nanping, Fujian), Wu Guang (吳光), went to Min's capital Changle (長樂, in modern Fuzhou, Fujian) to pay homage to the emperor. As Xue wanted to confiscate Wu Guang's wealth, he began to secretly look for evidence of crimes to use against Wu Guang. Wu Guang found out, and he led his followers, over 10,000, in defecting to Min's northwestern neighbor Wu.

Xue was apparently later made Wang's chief of staff (Shumishi), for he was referred to by that office later in the year. He was at that time advising Wang to find some ways to reduce the power of the members of the imperial Wang clan. As a result, Wang's nephew Wang Jitu (王繼圖) became incensed and considered a rebellion. Wang Jitu's plot was discovered, and Wang Jitu and some 1,000 followers were executed.

As Wang Lin was superstitious, he favored a number of sorcerers, including one Sheng Tao (盛韜). Xue further encouraged Wang in this behavior, stating to Wang, "Your Imperial Majesty has many wicked subjects among your officials. Unless you inquire of this from the ghosts and the gods, you cannot know this. Sheng Tao is good at communicating with the ghosts, and you should let him look into this." Wang agreed. Xue then used this method to eliminate a more senior political rival, fellow chief of staff Wu Xu (吳勗). At that time, Wu was ill, so Xue went to see him, stating to him, "As the Master believed that you, Lord, have been long ill, he is considering removing you from this position. I, your servant, told him that you, Lord, is merely having minor headaches and would soon be healed. If the Master sends emissaries to see you, do not tell him that your illness is anything but headaches." Wu believed him. The next day, Xue had Sheng inform Wang, "I have seen Prince Chongxun [(apparently a local deity)] of the North Temple try Wu Xu for treason, and he punished Wu by using a golden hammer to pound copper nails into Wu's brain." When Wang told this to Xue, Xue responded, "It might not be believable. It would be good to send emissaries to ask about this." When Wang's emissaries arrived at Wu's mansion, Wu told them that he was suffering from headaches. Wang, now believing in Sheng's vision, arrested Wu and allowed Xue and the jailers to torture him. Wu, unable to stand the torture, confessed. Wu, his wife, and his children were executed. It was said that this incident made the people more incensed with Xue.

== Death ==
Meanwhile, though, Wu Guang, after defecting to Wu, advocated that Wu launch a campaign against Min. The Wu prefect of Xin Prefecture (信州, in modern Shangrao, Jiangxi), Jiang Yanhui (蔣延徽), did not wait for his imperial government's approval, and went ahead and launched an attack on Jian Prefecture. By spring 934, he had defeated Min forces at Pucheng (浦城, in modern Nanping), and then advanced to Jian, putting it under siege. Wang Lin sent the generals Zhang Yanrou (張彥柔) and Wang Yanzong (王延宗, his brother) to command an army to try to relieve Jian. When Wang Yanzong's army was on the way, the soldiers refused to advance further, proclaiming, "If we do not have Xue Wenjie, we will not battle." When Wang Yanzong reported this to Wang Lin, the entire state was shocked. Wang Lin's mother Empress Dowager Huang and his son Wang Jipeng the Prince of Fu wept and stated to Wang Lin, "Xue Wenjie abused the powers of the state to falsely harm the innocent. The people in all strata of the population have long hated him. Now the Wu forces are deep in our territory, and the soldiers are refusing to advance. If the state is destroyed, what benefit is it to keep Xue's life?" Xue tried to persuade Wang Lin otherwise, but Wang Lin refused to decide. Shortly after, when Xue left the palace, he was ambushed and captured by soldiers under Wang Jipeng, who then put him in a caged wagon to deliver to the front. (It was said that Xue had himself thought that the caged wagons for prisoner transport had spaces that were too wide, so he ordered that the cages be shrunk, and that spikes were placed on the inside such that if the prisoner moved at all, he or she would be speared by the spikes. He ended up being the first prisoner to be placed in one of these modified wagons.) As he was being transported, the people threw stones and bricks at him.

However, it was also said that Xue, who was involved in sorcery himself, had previously predicted that if he suffered a disaster, if he could survive it for three days, then his fortune would change for the better. Those who transported him heard of the prediction and decided to transport him quickly. It took only two days for him to be transported to Wang Yanzong's army. When he arrived there, the soldiers leaped in joy, and they quickly cut off and ate his flesh. Wang Lin subsequently sent an emissary with a pardon for him, but by the time the emissary reached Wang Yanzong's camp, Xue had already been completely eaten. Sheng Tao was also executed. Subsequently, with Min forces, now placated, advancing on Jian, and aid forces from Min's northeastern neighbor Wuyue also arriving, Wu forces withdrew.

== Notes and references ==
- Spring and Autumn Annals of the Ten Kingdoms, vol. 98.
