= Li Sijian =

Chinese warlord

Li Sijian (Chinese: 李思諫) (died 908), probably né Tuoba Sijian (拓跋思諫), was an ethnically-Dangxiang warlord in the latter years of the Chinese Tang dynasty and Tang's successor state Later Liang of the Five Dynasties and Ten Kingdoms period, who controlled Dingnan Circuit (定難, headquartered in modern Yulin, Shaanxi) as its military governor (Jiedushi) in de facto independence.

== During Tang dynasty ==
It is not known when Li Sijian—likely known as Tuoba Sijian at his birth—was born. His family was of Dangxiang stock, of the Pingxia (平夏) branch. His older brother Tuoba Sigong became a warlord during the reign of Emperor Xizong of Tang and, for his role in aiding the Tang dynasty imperial government against the major agrarian rebel Huang Chao's state of Qi, was given the title of military governor of Dingnan Circuit, and was also given the imperial clan surname of Li. Li Sijian would have taken the surname of Li at the same time as well.

Li Sigong died around 886 (as he died before he could launch an army against the pretender Li Yun in support of Emperor Xizong—and Li Yun's regime was defeated in 886). Li Sijian succeeded him as military governor of Dingnan, while another brother, Li Sixiao (李思孝), was given Baoda Circuit (保大, headquartered in modern Yan'an, Shaanxi). (A different and inconsistent account, contained in the New History of the Five Dynasties, indicated that Li Sijian did not become military governor of Dingnan until 895, but that account appeared to confuse Li Sigong with another brother of theirs, Li Sijing (李思敬).)

In 895, when Emperor Xizong's brother and successor Emperor Zhaozong fled the capital Chang'an into the Qinling Mountains to the south of Chang'an in fear of the warlords Li Maozhen the military governor of Fengxiang Circuit (鳳翔, headquartered in modern Baoji, Shaanxi) and Wang Xingyu the military governor of Jingnan Circuit (靜難, headquartered in modern Xianyang, Shaanxi), the major warlord Li Keyong the military governor of Hedong Circuit (河東, headquartered in modern Taiyuan, Shanxi) arrived in the region to aid the emperor. In response, Emperor Zhaozong commissioned him to command the operations against Wang (whom Emperor Zhaozong deemed to be more of a threat than Li Maozhen or another ally of theirs, Han Jian the military governor of Zhenguo Circuit (鎮國, headquartered in modern Weinan, Shaanxi)), and also commissioned Li Sijian and Li Sixiao, as well as Zhang Fan (張鐇), to aid Li Keyong in the operations. (Li Keyong subsequently defeated Wang, and Wang was killed by his own subordinates.)

In 896, with Li Maozhen again threatening Chang'an, Emperor Zhaozong fled Chang'an again, to Han's Kuangguo Circuit. While there, Emperor Zhaozong commissioned the chancellor as the overall commander of the campaign against Li Maozhen, and commissioned Li Sijian as the deputy commander, as well as the military governor of Jingnan. However, the campaign was not actually launched, as Li Maozhen claimed that he was apologizing, and Han, who was a long-term ally of Li Maozhen, also dissuaded the actual launching of the campaign. When the campaign was formally cancelled in 897, Li Sijian was made the military governor of Ningsai Circuit (寧塞, i.e., Baoda). (However, there was no real indication in historical records that Li Sijian actually reported to Ningsai.)

== During Later Liang ==
In 907, the major warlord Zhu Quanzhong the military governor of Xuanwu Circuit (宣武, headquartered in modern Kaifeng, Henan) had Emperor Zhaozong's son and successor Emperor Ai yield the throne to him, ending Tang and starting a new Later Liang. He bestowed on Li Sijian the honorary titles of acting Taiwei (太尉) and Shizhong (侍中). In 908, Li Sijian died, and his son (or grandson, or grandnephew) Li Yichang declared himself acting military governor of Dingnan. The Later Liang emperor later formally granted full military governor title to Li Yichang.

== Notes and references ==
- New Book of Tang, vol. 221, part 1.
- Old History of the Five Dynasties, vol. 132.
- New History of the Five Dynasties, vol. 40.
- Zizhi Tongjian, vols. 260, 261, 267.
