= Unni (bishop) =

German archbishop

Saint Unni was an archbishop of Hamburg-Bremen (916 – 17 September 936). He died as a missionary in Birka in Sweden, where he tried to continue Ansgar's work.

According to Adam of Bremen, his body was buried in Birka, but his head was entombed in Bremen Cathedral. When the altar was taken down in 1840, a leaden plate was found with the inscription "VNNIS ARCHIEP(is)-C(opus)". After Ansgar and Rimbert of Turholt, epithetised Apostle of the North and second Apostle of the North, Unni is revered as third Apostle of the North and as Saint.

== Literature ==
- Tegnér, Göran (1995), "Unni", Vikingatidens ABC, Swedish Museum of National Antiquities, ISBN 91-7192-984-3, archived from the original on 2007-09-01

== Notes ==
Unni Born: unknown Died: 17 September 936 in Birka
Catholic Church titles
Preceded by Reginwart	Archbishop of Bremen-Hamburg; 916–936	Succeeded by Adaldag
