= 907 =

Calendar year

907 in various calendars
Gregorian calendar	907; CMVII
Ab urbe condita	1660
Armenian calendar	356; ԹՎ ՅԾԶ
Assyrian calendar	5657
Balinese saka calendar	828–829
Bengali calendar	313–314
Berber calendar	1857
Buddhist calendar	1451
Burmese calendar	269
Byzantine calendar	6415–6416
Chinese calendar	丙寅年 (Fire Tiger); 3604 or 3397 — to — 丁卯年 (Fire Rabbit); 3605 or 3398
Coptic calendar	623–624
Discordian calendar	2073
Ethiopian calendar	899–900
Hebrew calendar	4667–4668
- Hindu calendars
Vikram Samvat	963–964
Shaka Samvat	828–829
Kali Yuga	4007–4008
Holocene calendar	10907
Iranian calendar	285–286
Islamic calendar	294–295
Japanese calendar	Engi 7 (延喜７年)
Javanese calendar	806–807
Julian calendar	907; CMVII
Korean calendar	3240
Minguo calendar	1005 before ROC 民前1005年
Nanakshahi calendar	−561
Seleucid era	1218/1219 AG
Thai solar calendar	1449–1450
Tibetan calendar	མེ་ཕོ་སྟག་ལོ་ (male Fire-Tiger); 1033 or 652 or −120 — to — མེ་མོ་ཡོས་ལོ་ (female Fire-Hare); 1034 or 653 or −119

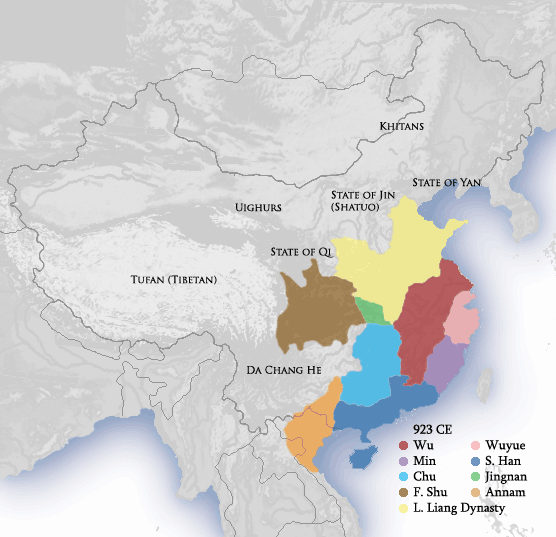
The Later Liang (yellow) and Ten Kingdoms

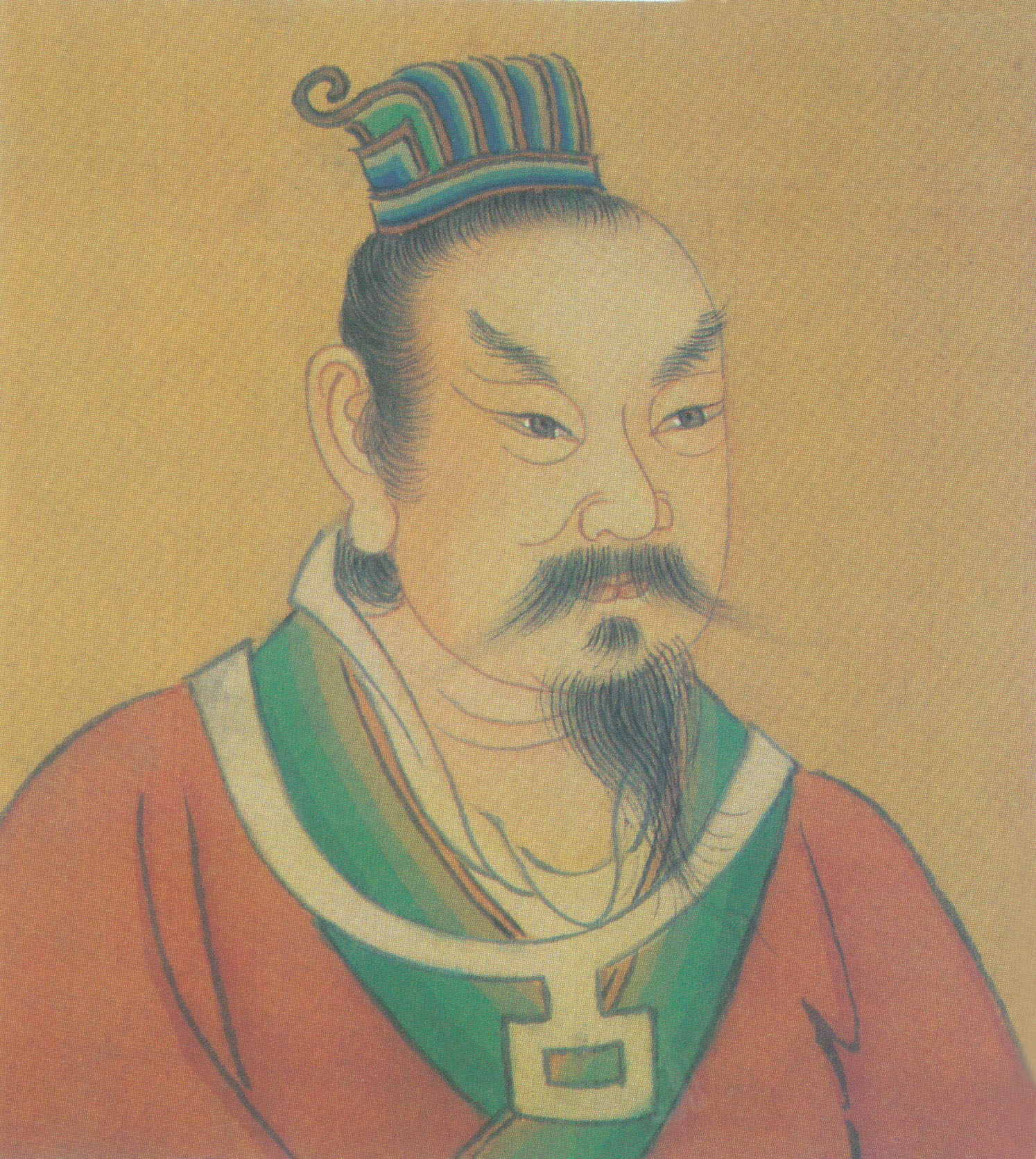
Emperor Taizu (Zhu Wen) (852–912)

Year 907 (CMVII) was a common year starting on Thursday of the Julian calendar.

== Events ==
=== By place ===
==== Byzantine Empire ====
- Rus'–Byzantine War: Varangian prince Oleg of Novgorod leads the Kievan Rus' in a campaign against Constantinople, concluded by the Rus'–Byzantine Treaty (in which the city of Chernihiv in Ukraine is first mentioned). He lays siege to the Byzantine capital with some 2,000 ships (dugout boats), and secures trading rights from the world's leading center of commerce.

==== Europe ====
- July 4–6 – Battle of Pressburg: At "Brezalauspurc" (probably modern-day Bratislava in Slovakia), the advancing East Frankish army (60,000 men) is annihilated by the Hungarians led by Grand Prince Árpád. Duke Luitpold and Archbishop Dietmar I are killed, together with 19 dukes, 2 bishops and 3 abbots. The East Frankish Kingdom loses control of the March of Pannonia.
- Summer – The Hungarians invade Bavaria, causing great destruction, occupying many towns and, on their way home, defeating a Bavarian army at Lengenfeld. The Hungarian-Bavarian border is fixed on the Enns River.

==== Britain ====
- Lady Æthelflæd of Mercia refortifies Chester against Viking attacks. King Edward the Elder founds Romsey Abbey (Hampshire).

==== Arabian Empire ====
- Emir Isma'il ibn Ahmad dies after a 15-year reign in which he has extended his borders to Tabaristan and Khorasan. He establishes independence throughout the eastern part of his empire from his capital at Bukhara. Isma'il is succeeded by his son Ahmad Samani as ruler of the Samanid Empire.

==== China ====
- The Five Dynasties and Ten Kingdoms period begins in China.
  - February 27 – Abaoji, ruler (khagan) of the confederation of Khitans, proclaims himself emperor and establishes the Liao dynasty, killing most of the other Khitan chieftains. He occupies territories along China's northern border including parts of Hebei and Shanxi provinces.
  - May 12
    - The short-lived Qi Kingdom is founded by the warlord Li Maozhen (Prince of Qi). His power is centered in Shaanxi province, in Northwest China. The Tang dynasty comes to an end after 289 years as Emperor Ai is forced to abdicate by chancellor Zhu Quanzhong.
    - The short-lived Wu Kingdom is founded by Yang Wo (Prince of Hongnong) in Jiangdu (South Central China). He refuses to acknowledge the rule of Zhu Quanzhong.
  - June 1 – Zhu Quanzhong (Zhu Wen) usurps the throne and proclaims himself the first emperor of Later Liang. China is controlled by successive short-lived kingdoms (until 960).
  - June 8 – The Chu Kingdom is founded by the warlord Ma Yin (Prince of Chu) in Changsha. Present-day Hunan and Guangxi provinces (Southern China) are under his control.
  - November 3 – The Former Shu Kingdom is founded by the warlord Wang Jian (Prince of Shu) in Chengdu. His power is centered in Sichuan province, in Southwest China.
  - December 1 – The Wuyue Kingdom is founded by the warlord Qian Liu in Hangzhou. His proclaims himself king, his power is centered in Jiangsu province (Eastern China).

=== By topic ===
==== Religion ====
- February 1 – Nicholas I Mystikos is deposed as Patriarch of Constanstinople, (having fallen out with the Byzantine Emperor Leo VI), and is replaced by Euthymius I Syncellus.

== Births ==
- November 26 – Rudesind, Galician bishop (d. 977)
- Bertha of Swabia, Frankish queen (approximate date)
- Robert of Vermandois, Frankish nobleman (approximate date)
- Wenceslaus I, duke of Bohemia (approximate date) (k. 935)

== Deaths ==
- May 2 – Boris I, ruler (knyaz) of the Bulgarian Empire
- July 4
  - Dietmar I, archbishop of Salzburg
  - Luitpold, margrave of Bavaria
- Alan I, duke ('king') of Brittany
- Árpád, Grand Prince of the Hungarians (approximate date)
- Herbert I, Frankish nobleman
- Isma'il ibn Ahmad, emir of the Samanid Empire
- Radelchis II, Lombard prince
- Rudesind I, bishop of Dumium (Spain)
