= Tughril I =

Sultan of the Seljuk Empire from 1037 to 1063

Tughril
- Beg; Malik al-Mashriq wa'l-Maghrib (Note: King of the East and the West); Rukn al-Dawla (Note: The Pillar of State); Al-sultan Al-mu'azzam; Shahanshah (Note: King of Kings)
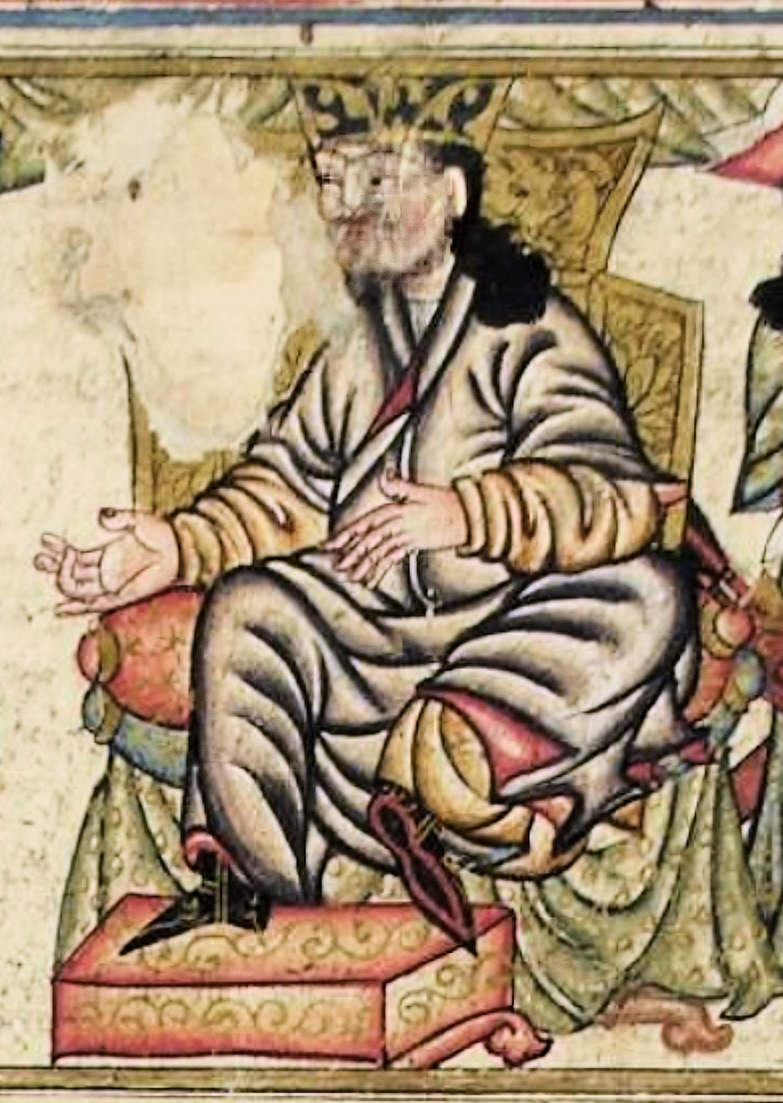
- Seljuk Sultan Tugrul Bey enthroned. Jami al-Tawarikh, 1314, Topkapı Sarayı Müzesi H1653-3 (304 B).

Sultan of the Seljuk Empire
- Reign: 1037 – 4 October 1063
- Predecessor: Position established
- Successor: Alp Arslan
- Born: c. 993; Central Asian Steppe
- Died: 4 October 1063 (aged 70); Ray, Jibal, Seljuk Empire
- Burial: Tuğrul Tower, Ray, Iran
- Spouse: Altun Jan Khatun; Akka Khatun; Fülane Khatun; Farrukh al-Khatuni; Sayyida Khatun
Names
- Tughril ibn Mika'il
- House: Seljuk
- Father: Mikail
- Religion: Sunni Islam

Muhammad Tughril ibn Mika'il (Persian: ابوطالبْ محمد طغرل بن میکائیل), better known as Tughril (طغرل / طغریل; also spelled Toghril / Tughrul), was a Turkoman chieftain, who founded the Seljuk Empire, ruling from 1037 to 1063.

Tughril united many Turkoman warriors of the Central Asian steppes into a confederacy of tribes and led them in conquest of Khorasan and eastern Persia. He would later establish the Seljuk Sultanate after conquering Persia and taking the Abbasid capital of Baghdad from the Buyids in 1055. Tughril relegated the Abbasid Caliphs to state figureheads and took command of the caliphate's armies in military offensives against the Byzantine Empire and the Fatimids in an effort to expand his empire's borders and unite the Islamic world.

After the deaths of Seljuk leaders such as Israil and Mikail, the Seljuks submitted to the authority of Tughril Bey and began expanding their territories under the leadership of his brother, Chaghri Beg. In 1037, Tughril was declared sultan by the prominent figures of the Seljuk dynasty, and a sermon (khutbah) was delivered in his name. Following the death of Mahmud of Ghazni and the accession of Sultan Masʽud, the Seljuks, under Tughril’s leadership, engaged in several phases of warfare with the Ghaznavids. As a result, the Seljuks emerged as a new power in the Middle East after their decisive victory in the Battle of Dandanqan in 1040, which brought an end to Ghaznavid rule in Greater Khorasan and surrounding regions. Subsequently, Tughril settled in Nishapur as his capital and, with the support of his brother and close allies, established his own state.

Following the Battle of Dandanaqan, Tughril, along with the Seljuk leadership, sent a letter to the Abbasid caliph al-Qa'im bi-Amrillah, requesting an official decree of authority, which was granted. Between the years 1040–1054, with the assistance of Ibrahim Inal, Tughril conquered large parts of Iranian territory, including the regions of Jibal and Iraq-i Ajam, and brought an end to the Buyid government in these areas. He captured the city of Ray, restored it, and declared it the capital. However, after capturing Isfahan, he moved the capital there. Later, Tughril brought Azerbaijan under his control and carried out military campaigns against Byzantium and other regions of Eastern Roman territories, further expanding the Seljuk realm.

In 1055, accepting an invitation from the Abbasid caliph to visit Baghdad, Tughril initiated a new phase in Seljuk–Abbasid relations. Between 1055–1061, he eliminated Buyid rule in Baghdad, captured Malik Rahim, and had sermons read in his name in those territories. After restoring Baghdad, Tughril arranged the marriage of Chaghri Beg’s daughter to the Abbasid caliph, thus strengthening ties with the caliphate. He subsequently seized the Jazira region. Later, after suppressing a revolt by his brother Ibrahim Inal and executing him, Tughril also defeated Arslan al-Basasiri, who had the backing of the Fatimid Caliphate. He married the caliph’s daughter despite opposition from the caliph himself—a union that was accompanied by numerous challenges. Ultimately, in 1063, Tughril died without leaving an heir and left behind a vast empire.

Tughril Beg was known as a devout figure and commissioned the construction of many mosques and madrasas. He was recognized for his adherence to the Hanafi school of Islamic jurisprudence and, with the assistance of his vizier Amid al-Mulk Kunduri, imposed restrictions on the activities of other Islamic sects. While some sources describe him as a just ruler who avoided unnecessary bloodshed, other accounts report oppressive conduct by him and his army.

Tughril’s legacy was the administrative model he created, which was composed of the Turkic political tradition, the region’s customary administrative principles, and the religious legitimacy derived from the Abbasid Caliphate. This model reshaped the institution of sultanate into a form of absolute rule endowed with extraordinary authority. This form of rule overshadowed the worldly power of the caliph, recognizing only his spiritual leadership. Consequently, the caliph was compelled to submit to Tughril’s demands. Before the advent of the Seljuks, Iran was divided between several warring local powers, such as the Buyids, Kakuyids and Ghaznavids. As a result, it suffered from continuous war and destruction. However, under Tughril peace and prosperity were brought to the country and to Mesopotamia, a transition that was further reinforced due to the Seljuks' assimilation to Iranian-Muslim culture.

== Name ==
"Tughril" was the Old Turkic word for a bird of prey, possibly the Crested goshawk. In early Turkic history and culture, starting from the Uyghur Khaganate and onwards, it was used as a personal name.

== Early life ==
Tughril was born in c. 993, most likely in the Central Asian steppes, where nomadic Oghuz Turks were roaming to find pasture for livestock. After the death of his father Mikail, Tughril and his brother Chaghri were reportedly raised by their grandfather Seljuk (the eponymous founder of the Seljuks) in Jand. It was seemingly during this period that the Seljuk family converted to Islam, at least nominally. In the following decades, the Seljuks were employed as mercenaries under the warring factions of Transoxiana and Khwarazm, in exchange for pasture for their herds.

In the 1020s, Tughril and his other relatives were serving the Kara-Khanids of Bukhara. In 1026, the Kara-Khanids were driven out of Bukhara by the Ghaznavid Sultan Mahmud of Ghazni. Seljuk's son Arslan Isra'il fled to a place near Sarakhs, where he asked Mahmud for permission to settle in the area in return for military aid. Mahmud, however, had Arslan Isra'il put in prison, where the latter soon died. Meanwhile, Tughril and Chaghri remained loyal to their Kara-Khanid overlords, although there were disputes between them in 1029; in 1032, they fought alongside the Kara-Khanids at the Battle of Dabusiyya.

After the Kara-Khanid ruler Ali-Tegin's death, however, the Seljuks changed their allegiance to the ruler of Khwarazm, Harun, but were repelled by the Oghuz ruler Shah Malik in 1035. The Seljuks then went to the same place as Arslan Isra'il, and asked the son of Mahmud, Mas'ud I, for asylum. Mas'ud, however, considered the nomadic Turks to be dangerous and sent an army under his commander-in-chief Begtoghdi. The army was shortly defeated by the Seljuks, who forced Mas'ud to surrender Nasa, Farava and Dihistan in return for Seljuk recognition of Ghaznavid authority and protection of the region from other Turkic tribes.

In 1037, the Seljuks also forced the Ghaznavids to cede them Sarakhs, Abivard and Marw. The Seljuks then slowly began to subdue the cities of Khorasan, and, when they captured Nishapur, Tughril proclaimed himself Sultan of Khorasan.

== The political and military history of the Seljuk Turks ==
The political and military history of the Seljuk dynasty began in the second half of the 4th century AH (late 9th and early 10th centuries CE) with Seljuk’s involvement in political and military conflicts that took place in the northeastern regions of the Caspian Sea and northern Transoxiana.

Following Seljuk, his sons—Israel, Musa Yabghu, and Mikail—as well as Mikail’s sons, Tughril Beg and Chaghri Beg, participated in the ongoing conflicts in the regions of Transoxiana and Khwarazm. They entered the service of various rulers, primarily the Samanids, in return for guarantees of access to pasturelands for their livestock and even resisted other Turkic groups. Toward the end of the Samanid period, some Turks initially assisted the Samanids in combating other Turks and defeated their enemies. However, they later departed from the Samanids and turned against them. The role of the Seljuk family and other Turks or Oghuz in this matter is debated; while some sources accuse the Seljuks, others exonerate them. After the fall of the Samanids, the Seljuks became subject to the Qarakhanids, continued their nomadic lifestyle under their service, and gradually consolidated their power. The Seljuk dynasty collaborated with the Qarakhanid ruler Ali Tigin and supported him in capturing Bukhara in 1020. Later, one of the Seljuks married Ali Tigin’s daughter and, through this marriage, gained a special status within Ali Tigin’s domain.

Meanwhile, Mahmud of Ghazni took advantage of the unrest in Qarakhanid territories and, under the pretext of rescuing those suffering under Ali Tigin’s oppression, launched a campaign into Transoxiana. In reality, he aimed to establish control over Bukhara and Samarkand. With Mahmud’s arrival in the region, Ali Tigin fled to the desert, and his ally Israel Seljukoghlu went into hiding.

According to different accounts, Israel was captured after Mahmud discovered his hiding place, sent to Ghazni, and later to India, where he remained until his death. Another version states that Mahmud invited one of the Seljuks to his court, and Israel, as the senior member of the family, accepted the invitation. At first, Mahmud treated him warmly and respectfully, but later, fearing the growing power of the Seljuks and their numerous soldiers, he arrested him along with his followers and imprisoned him in a fortress in India, where Israel died.

To prevent a Seljuk uprising, Mahmud of Ghazni portrayed this incident as accidental and temporary. Initially, the Seljuks considered revolting against Mahmud, but upon receiving his message and recognizing his strength, they abandoned this plan.

=== The Seljuks’ entry into Khorasan and seizure of power ===
The Seljuk Turks requested permission from Sultan Mahmud of Ghazni to settle in Khorasan and benefit from its natural resources. In their current location, the scarcity of pastures and the oppression of various regional rulers had created difficult conditions for them. Confident in his powerful army and convinced that the death of Seljuk leaders would disperse their forces, Sultan Mahmud ignored the warnings of his advisors and allowed the Turcomans to enter Khorasan. Following this permission, they crossed the Jayhun (Amu Darya) River and settled in the deserts around Sarakhs, Farava, and Bavard. According to another account, they were located between Nisa and Abivard.

The most vocal opponent of this decision was Arslan Jazib, the governor of Tus. He openly objected to the Sultan’s decision. However, Mahmud dismissed his concerns, labeling him "harsh." Some sources suggest that the Turcomans’ reliability as a military force and the revenues generated from their presence in Khorasan influenced Mahmud’s decision. The Turcomans settled in Khorasan and benefited from the region’s vast pastures and rich resources. However, they soon began looting and revolting. The people complained to Sultan Mahmud about their actions. The Sultan ordered Arslan Jazib to suppress them, but Arslan failed to manage the situation, and the Sultan reprimanded him severely. Arslan requested the Sultan to come personally to Khorasan, and in 419 AH (1028/1029), the Sultan set out for the city of Tus in great anger. After meeting with Arslan and receiving a report on the situation, the Sultan gave him a large army to defeat the Seljuks. In a battle near Rabat, close to Farava, Arslan inflicted a heavy defeat on the Turcomans. Many were killed, others were captured, and the rest fled to Balkh and Dihistan (regions located in the south and west of Khwarazm).

Despite this severe defeat, the Turcomans were not completely destroyed and began to wait for an opportunity to return to Khorasan. After Sultan Mahmud’s death, the Seljuks corresponded with Sultan Masud in the hope of returning to Khorasan and, after agreeing to certain conditions, re-entered the region. However, they soon resumed their plundering and attacks. One of the key factors in the Seljuks’ rise was Sultan Masud’s failure to properly assess their threat and his excessive focus on India. This ultimately led to Sultan Masud’s devastating defeat and death. The Seljuk Turks engaged Sultan Masud and his representatives in several battles across Khorasan and defeated them each time.

== Reign ==
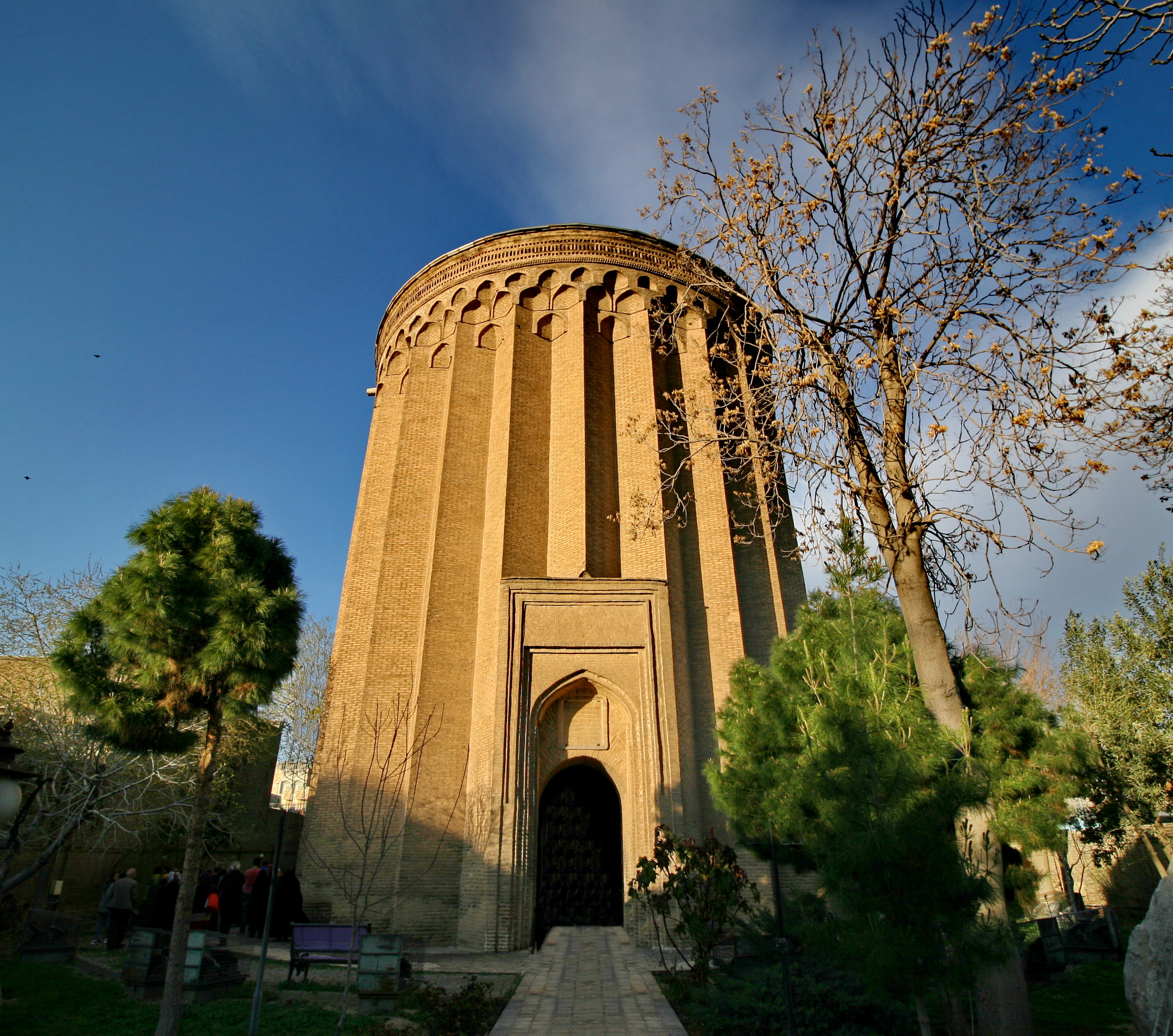
Tughrul tower in the city of Rey, modern Iran.

=== The rise of Tughril and the clash with Masʽud I ===
The first appearance of Tughril in the political history of the Seljuks is linked to a letter addressed to Abu al-Fadl Suri, written jointly by him, Yabghu, and Dawud. In this letter, they requested mediation for resolving the issues with Sultan Mas'ud and described their dire situation, expressing their readiness to send one of their leaders as a hostage in return for being granted control over the regions of Nisa and Farava. Additionally, they pledged to prevent raids by Turcomans from Iraq and Khwarazm and to suppress revolts around Mount Balkhan, Dehistan, and the vicinity of the Jayhun River. Following this correspondence, Sultan Mas'ud rejected the Seljuks’ request, leading to a military confrontation near Nasa in the year 426 AH (1034 CE), which marked a significant turning point for the Seljuks. After these battles, the city came under Tughril’s control. Some sources note that these events coincided with the conquests of Nishapur and Sarakhs by Tughril and Chaghri Beg. In 1037, another battle occurred between the Seljuk and Ghaznavid forces near Sarakhs, resulting in a heavy defeat for the Ghaznavids. This defeat allowed the Seljuks to establish military superiority over Khorasan and weakened the Ghaznavid army. As a result, in the years 1037-1038, the Seljuks brought most of Khorasan under their control, with the exception of Balkh.

After establishing full control over Khorasan in 1037, the Seljuks declared Tughril as their leader, and for the first time, the Friday sermon (khutbah) was delivered in his name. Tughril’s stepbrother, Ibrahim Inal, conquered Nishapur with 200 cavalry and had the khutbah recited in Tughril’s name during the first Friday prayer. Shortly thereafter, Tughril entered Nishapur, was received with a grand ceremony, hosted at the Shadiyakh garden, and then ascended the throne of Mas'ud of Ghazni. Some sources also attribute these events to the years 1028–29.

After Chaghri Beg conquered Nishapur, he intended to plunder the city. However, Tughril, relying on his elevated position and in response to the caliph's request that the Seljuks refrain from plundering, dissuaded Chaghri Beg from doing so by paying him 40,000 dinars.

In the year 431 AH (1040 CE), the most significant and decisive battle between the Ghaznavids and Seljuks took place at a location called Dandanqan. Sultan Mas'ud’s arrogance, his disregard for advice, removal of loyal officials, the defection of some soldiers to the Seljuks, and other strategic missteps led to a crushing defeat for the Ghaznavids. Following this defeat, Sultan Mas'ud was killed, and the Ghaznavids’ power was effectively broken in the face of Seljuk ascendancy. After the victory at Dandanaqan, Tughril and other Seljuk leaders, including Chaghri Beg and Musa Yabghu, sent a letter to the Abbasid caliph al-Qa'im bi-Amrillah requesting an official decree confirming their authority. The letter highlighted the services rendered by the Seljuks, the oppression they had endured at the hands of Sultan Mahmud, the errors of Sultan Mas'ud, and their decisive victory at the Battle of Dandanaqan.

=== Establishment of the state ===
After the Seljuks came to power on Iranian soil and established their state, they began to pursue a policy influenced by the political culture of Iran, which, in contrast to traditional Turkic customs and practices, emphasized the strengthening of central authority and the succession of the eldest son of the deceased ruler to the throne. This policy eventually led to internal conflicts and rivalries among members of the dynasty, resulting in unfavorable consequences. According to the original administrative structure of the Turkic empires, the territory of the empire was governed by two influential members of the ruling dynasty, referred to as the Khagan and the Yabghu. Within this framework, Tughril Beg and Chaghri Beg Davud assumed the roles of leaders and administrators. Both of their names were mentioned together in the khutbahs and jointly inscribed on coins. One resided in Nishapur, while the other was based in Merv. After the Battle of Dandanaqan, the Seljuk nobles recognized Tughril’s authority, and in accordance with the Turkic political system, Tughril assumed the title of khaqan. Chaghri, on the other hand, accepted the title of yabghu, and despite holding his own administrative powers, he acknowledged the sovereignty of Sultan Tughril and submitted to his authority. However, some sources claim that their positions were in fact equal.

After arriving in Iran, the Seljuks, in line with their traditional practices, divided the conquered territories among prominent members of the family and their subordinates as major settlements. Each region was entrusted to an appointed authority, and Seljuk leaders were dispatched to administer their respective territories. As a result of this distribution, Tughril was granted the authority to govern the central region of Iran—'Iraq-i Ajam'.

The arrival of the Turcomans in Iran is not solely associated with conquest, plunder, and the pursuit of wealth. It is believed that they entered Iran and its fertile lands with the intention of permanent settlement. After becoming familiar with the political, military, and social conditions of Iran, the Turcomans extended their ambitions beyond the borders of Khorasan and began considering territories beyond Iran’s frontiers as well. One of the indicators supporting this notion is Tughril’s adoption of the title al-Sultan al-Mu‘azzam (“the Exalted Sultan”), which reflected his grand ambitions and the gradual realization of his envisioned objectives. Tughril divided his territories among members of his family to ensure that trustworthy forces would maintain control over those regions. Furthermore, he relied on his loyal and experienced military companions, such as his brother Ibrahim Inal, Chaghri’s sons Yaquti and Alp Arslan, his cousin Qutalmish, and Israel’s son, in pursuit of his main goal: the conquest of targeted lands.

=== Western and Central Iran during the early Seljuk period ===
At the time of the Seljuks’ entry into Iran in 431 AH (1040 CE), the region was, in the words of Vladimir Minorsky, experiencing a “Daylamite interlude.” During this period, Daylamite-origin dynasties—particularly the Buyids—held power in the mountainous regions of northern and northwestern Iran, as well as in the remote southern territories stretching as far as Iraq and the shores of the Persian Gulf. Some Kurdish emirs had also allied themselves with these dynasties. Among them was the Banu Annaz dynasty of Shahinjan, heirs of the Hasanwayhid lineage, which had operated in Hulwan and Kermanshah. Other Kurdish tribes also wielded influence and power in Kurdistan, Luristan, and the eastern parts of Fars. In this context, the Shabankara Kurds and the Banu Marwan can also be mentioned. However, following the death of Nasr al-Dawla, the ruler of the Banu Marwan, their territory too came under Seljuk influence.

By the time Tughril Beg advanced westward from Khorasan, the Buyids were already in decline. Their administrative system consisted of three separate emirates, lacking political and geographical cohesion. Their governing authority was fragmented among the Iranian plateau’s center, Fars, and Iraq. Nevertheless, familial bonds among the dynasty’s founders and their administrative competence had preserved a degree of coordination between these regions. However, following the death of 'Adud al-Dawla (d. 372 AH), the political unity established during his reign disintegrated, and the next generation of the dynasty opposed his political trajectory.

Initially, the Buyids relied on Daylamite infantry forces. Later, they strengthened their military by recruiting Turkic cavalry. However, for unknown reasons, the use of Daylamite soldiers gradually diminished during the 10th and 11th centuries, and eventually, the emirates became fully dependent on Turkic mercenaries. These Turkic military units often rebelled and began to operate independently of the emirs' authority, leading to a weakening of central Buyid power. The Buyids’ inclination toward Shi‘ism, particularly the doctrine of Twelver Shi‘ism, initially reinforced their authority. Yet over time, this policy lost its efficacy. Political Shi‘ism failed to establish dominance in the East, and the Ismailis maintained control over only limited territories. Additionally, the rise of the Turks and the resurgence of power by the Abbasid caliph al-Qa’im further strengthened the caliphate’s position in Iraq.

By 421 AH (1030 CE), the Buyids still controlled vast territories, but they were facing serious attacks in the northern and central parts of Iran. In many cities, strong governance was either absent or in the hands of incompetent rulers. Some areas had fallen under the control of the Kakuyids, a Daylamite dynasty with close ties to the Buyids. However, this dynasty only managed to establish a brief and unstable rule in central Iran. Furthermore, the expansion of Turcoman tribes operating in Iraq into northern and central Iran—particularly their interest in Rayy and Hamadan—undermined the ambitions of rulers like Ibn Kakuyah and ultimately led to their submission to the Turkcomans. In the end, the military victories of the Turks in Iran broke the resistance of both the Ghaznavids and the Buyids, paving the way for the migration of numerous Turkcoman tribes from Central Asia into Iran.

=== Tughril’s first military campaigns as sultan ===
==== Gurgan and Tabaristan ====
In 433 AH (1041–1042 CE), Tughril took advantage of the political turmoil that arose in Gorgan due to the conflict between Anushirvan ibn Manuchihr of the Ziyarid dynasty and his military commander, Abu Kalijar. Seizing this opportunity, Tughril launched a campaign into the region. After overcoming brief resistance from the local population, he collected one hundred thousand dinars from the inhabitants, appointed Mardavij ibn Basu as governor of the city, and secured an annual tribute of fifty thousand dinars from him before returning to Nishapur.

Subsequently, Mardavij ibn Basu marched on Sari with the aim of defeating Anushirvan. As a result, Anushirvan agreed to pay an annual tribute of thirty thousand dirhams and to have the khutbah read in Tughril’s name within his territories. Following this agreement, Mardavij married Anushirvan’s mother, thereby bringing Anushirvan under his authority. As a consequence of these events, Gorgan and Tabaristan came under Seljuk control.

Regarding the reason the Seljuks did not settle permanently in Tabaristan, Foruzani argues that the region’s humid climate was incompatible with their nature. However, Mo’allimi disagrees, suggesting instead that Tughril was too preoccupied with matters in Iraq, especially those related to Baghdad, to focus on the complicated situation in Mazandaran.

==== Khwarazm ====
In 428 AH (1036–1037 CE), by order of Mas‘ud of Ghazna, his official Shahmalik was dispatched to Khwarazm with instructions to defeat Isma‘il Khandaq and his supporters. Shahmalik, who was also the governor of Jand, launched his campaign four years later, in 432 AH. After a prolonged and intense battle, he captured Khwarazm and had the khutbah read in Mas‘ud’s name. Following their defeat, Altunash’s son Isma‘il and his chamberlain Shakar sought refuge with Tughril Beg and Chaghri Beg, requesting their assistance. Chaghri Beg, accompanied by them, launched a campaign against Shahmalik in an effort to recapture Khwarazm. However, he was defeated in battle and withdrew to Khorasan, where he spent the winter. The following year, he returned to Khwarazm with Tughril Beg, and together they laid siege to the fortress where Shahmalik had taken refuge. They managed to deceive Shahmalik into leaving the fortress, and in the ensuing battle, many of his soldiers were killed, while forty of his close companions were captured. After this defeat, Shahmalik fled across the desert to Dehistan, then to Tabas, and passed through the regions of Kirman and Tis (in present-day southern Sistan) before reaching Makran. However, he was suddenly attacked, captured by Artash—brother of Ibrahim Inal—and handed over to Chaghri Beg. Under the order of Chaghri Beg, Shahmalik was executed, and control over Khwarazm was granted to a member of the Seljuk family.

=== Establishment of Ray as the Seljuk capital ===
At the beginning of 433 AH (1041–1042 CE), the founder of the Kakuyid dynasty, ‘Ala al-Dawla Abu Ja‘far Kakuyah—who governed Ray, Isfahan, Hamadan, and parts of western Iran—died. He was succeeded by his son, Zahir al-Din Abu Mansur Faramarz. However, a rebellion led by his brothers against Faramarz created the conditions for Seljuk military intervention in the territories under Kakuyid control. That same year, Tughril Beg’s maternal half-brother, Ibrahim Inal, launched an attack on Ray and demanded Faramarz’s submission to the Seljuks. Lacking both the will to submit and the strength to confront Ibrahim’s army, Faramarz abandoned Ray. Ibrahim then occupied the city, stabilized the situation, and brought the surrounding regions under his control. He proceeded to conquer Borujerd and then advanced toward Hamadan.

During Ibrahim’s march toward Hamadan, Faramarz’s brother, Abu Kalijar Garshasp, was in control of the city. Upon learning of Ibrahim’s advance, Garshasp fled to Shapurkhwast. Ibrahim established a camp near Hamadan, and the city’s inhabitants agreed to submit to him on the condition that Garshasp be pursued and captured. Ibrahim accepted this condition and, after collecting a certain amount of money from them, set out in pursuit of Garshasp. He seized Shapurkhwast by force and plundered it, but failed to capture Garshasp, who had taken refuge in the city’s fortress. In 434 AH (1042–1043 CE), Tughril Beg arrived in Ray. According to Bosworth, Ibrahim ceased his campaigns in the aforementioned regions and set out for Ray to meet Tughril. Meanwhile, Garshasp returned to Hamadan. At this point, Tughril reclaimed all the territories Ibrahim had seized, including Ray and the province of Jibal.

Two main hypotheses have been proposed regarding Tughril’s decision:

1. Tughril needed a strategically located and secure central base—such as Ray and Jibal—in order to achieve his long-term objectives.

2. The inhumane conduct displayed by Ibrahim and his Turkic companions during their conquests—particularly the devastation of Ray and the plundering of Shapurkhwast—was inconsistent with Tughril’s strategic aims. Tughril sought to win popular support and counteract negative perceptions of the Seljuks. The actions of Ibrahim and his men seriously undermined these efforts, prompting Tughril to repossess the territories they had captured.

Following these events, Tughril issued a decree to restore the ruined city of Ray and designated it as his capital. In Ray, he came into possession of several gold statues adorned with precious stones, as well as two Chinese porcelain jars filled with jewels.

Additionally, the Abbasid caliph al-Qa’im bi-Amrillah sent one of his trusted men, Habbattullah Ma’muni, to Tughril in Ray. Through this envoy, the caliph conveyed his goodwill and friendship toward Tughril. These gestures marked the beginning of a relationship between the Seljuks and the Abbasid caliphate, based on mutual interests.

=== Continuation of conquests in Iraq-i Ajam ===
Following the conquest of Khorasan and the establishment of the Seljuk state, Tughril assigned the division of conquered territories among his brothers and nephews and delegated to them the task of conquering new regions. His primary goals were, first, to consolidate his authority over the territories he had already brought under his control, and second, to rapidly expand Seljuk power by subjugating additional regions. Thus, the empire was divided into provinces, and each trusted relative was not only assigned a province to govern but also tasked with the conquest of neighboring lands. Chaghri Beg, as the eldest brother, made Merv and Khorasan his base; Musa was appointed over Bust, Herat, and Sistan; and Qavurt, the son of Chaghri Beg, chose Nahavand and Kirman. Qavurt defeated the Buyid ruler’s army in Kirman and Makran, and brought Kirman under his control.

==== Qazvin ====
After designating Ray as the capital, Tughril advanced with his army toward Qazvin. The inhabitants of Qazvin resisted his entry into the city, which prompted Tughril to launch an attack. As a result, many of the city’s residents were killed or taken captive. Fearing further consequences—particularly the looting and pillaging of their property—the city’s leaders intervened to prevent further resistance. They offered Tughril a gift of 80,000 dirhams and pledged their allegiance. The local governor likewise recognized Tughril’s sovereignty.

==== Daylam ====
Tughril then sent a letter to the ruler of Daylam, calling upon him to submit to Seljuk authority and to pay a specific tribute. The Daylamite ruler complied with Tughril’s demand, sending the required tribute along with various gifts. Additionally, the commander of Ṭārom responded positively to Tughril’s letter, which demanded a gift of 200,000 dinars, and accepted his suzerainty, becoming Tughril’s vassal.

==== Hamadan ====
As previously mentioned, after Ibrahim Inal’s withdrawal, Garshasp had returned to Hamadan. In 434 AH, Tughril launched a campaign to capture Hamadan and brought it under his control. He appointed a man named Nasir ʿAlawi as the governor of the city and returned to Ray.

==== Gorgan and Ṭabaristan ====
Some time later, Nasir was captured by Gurshasp, but Tughril liberated him and entrusted him with the governance of Ray. It is believed that Nasir’s appointment to Ray was connected to Tughril’s plans to advance toward Gurgan and Ṭabaristan. In those regions, Mardavij ibn Bisu, one of Tughril’s officials, had died and been succeeded by his son. However, Tughril did not accept the hereditary transfer of power in these territories. Thus, he marched to Gurgan, dismissed the newly appointed governor, and handed over control of the region to a man named Asfar, a close associate of Manuchihr of the Ziyarid family.

==== Hamadan (1046) ====
In 1045, Garshasp returned once again to Hamadan and expelled Tughril’s officials from the city, ordering the khutbah to be read in his own name. Upon learning of this, Tughril set out to reassert his authority in the region and, in 1046, dispatched Ibrahim Inal to reconquer the province of Jibal. As part of this campaign, Ibrahim marched on Hamadan and, after Garshasp fled, brought the city under his control.

==== Dinavar, Kirmanshah, and Hulwan ====
In western Iran, a man named Abu Shuk, who controlled certain territories, fled the city of Dinavar in anticipation of an assault by Ibrahim Inal. Ibrahim seized this opportunity and captured the city. After stabilizing the situation in Dinavar, he advanced toward Kirmanshah in pursuit of Abu Shuk. However, Abu Shuk fled to Hulwan. Ibrahim engaged in fierce clashes with Kirmanshah’s defenders and, in 1046, succeeded in taking the city. He then marched toward Hulwan, capturing several villages and fortresses along the way. Upon reaching Hulwan, he found that Abu Shuk and the local population had already abandoned the city. Thus, Ibrahim entered without resistance and looted the town.

==== Other conflicts ====
In 1047, after Abu Shuk’s death, his brother and successor Mahlehl expelled Ibrahim Inal’s governor Badr ibn Tahir from Kirmanshah and assumed control. That same year, Mahlehl’s son Muhammad seized Dinavar. These territories subsequently passed between Abu Shuk’s son Sa‘di—who had now allied himself with Ibrahim—and various uncles and cousins. In 1048, Ibrahim Inal took advantage of the internal discord between Sa‘di and other members of his family and regained control of his former domains. Additionally, he annexed a number of villages and fortresses, and after gaining control over the city of Shahrizur, further expanded the reach of his authority.

One of the reasons for Ibrahim’s frequent clashes with local rulers and tribes was the recurring raids carried out by him and his army. For the Turks in Ibrahim’s ranks, such plundering was seen as part of a traditional war practice. This custom, inherited from their nomadic lifestyle in Central Asia, continued to be an integral aspect of their conduct.

=== Establishment of Isfahan as the Seljuk capital ===
Following the Seljuk victory at the Battle of Dandanaqan, Tughril showed special respect to Faramarz, a member of the Kakuyid dynasty, and promised him the administration of cities such as Ray and Isfahan. However, as previously mentioned, in 1042, Ibrahim Inal expelled Faramarz from Ray, leaving him with control over Isfahan alone. It appears that Faramarz’s discontent with Ray being handed over to the Seljuks, and the resentment this imposed concession engendered, led to a shift in his political stance and ultimately compelled him to oppose Tughril. In an effort to subdue him, Tughril dispatched cavalry forces to Isfahan in 1043. These troops pillaged the surrounding areas before returning to Ray. Later that same year, Tughril announced his intention to march on Isfahan and departed from Ray. Upon learning of Tughril’s movements, Faramarz initiated correspondence with him, eventually persuading Tughril to abandon the campaign by offering a certain payment.

In the month of Muharram in 1046, Faramarz declared his loyalty and allegiance to the Buyid heir Sultan Abu Kalijar and ordered the khutbah to be read in his name in Isfahan and its surrounding regions. Shortly thereafter, in 1047, Tughril laid siege to Isfahan. However, as he was unable to enter the city, he opted for negotiation and reached an agreement with Faramarz: the ruler of Isfahan was to deliver regular tribute payments and have the khutbah read in Tughril’s name within the city and its surroundings.

In 1049, Sultan Abu Kalijar died and was succeeded by his son, Sultan Rahim. During this period, Faramarz occasionally expressed his loyalty to Tughril, while at other times he acted under the authority of Sultan Rahim. This dual allegiance eventually led Tughril to dispatch an army to Isfahan in 1051, initiating a siege that lasted for an entire year. During this period, several skirmishes broke out between the forces of Tughril and Faramarz, although Tughril managed to control only the outskirts of the city. The prolonged siege and the devastation of surrounding villages forced the city's notables to initiate negotiations. They sent envoys offering submission and a specified tribute in an attempt to obtain Tughril’s approval. However, Tughril insisted on complete capitulation. Meanwhile, the people of Isfahan, suffering from severe food shortages, could no longer resist. As a result, they declared their submission and surrendered the city to Tughril. Tughril then awarded certain regions in Jibal as iqṭāʿ (fiefs) to some of Faramarz’s military commanders and thereby removed them from Isfahan. Faramarz himself was granted the cities of Yazd and Abarkuh as his iqṭāʿ. Tughril also treated the inhabitants of Isfahan with kindness. Thus, in the month of Muharram in 1052, Tughril entered Isfahan. The city appealed to Tughril’s tastes and sensibilities, and for this reason, it was selected as the new capital of the Seljuk state. Military supplies and weaponry were transferred from Ray to Isfahan.

=== Continued campaigns in the northwest and west ===
==== First permanent Seljuk entry into Anatolia ====
Long before Tughril's reign, the Turcomans had launched several raids into Anatolia — known as Eastern Rome or Byzantine territories. However, during Tughril’s reign, for the first time in 1048, the Turcomans, under the leadership of Ibrahim Inal, began organizing systematic campaigns into Byzantine lands. Encouraged by Ibrahim’s calls, the Turks moved toward the borders of Rum, and Ibrahim followed them into those territories. Upon arrival, they engaged in fierce battles with Byzantine and Abkhazian forces in areas such as Manzikert (Malazgird), Erzurum, Cilicia, and Trebizond. These encounters witnessed both defeats and victories. Ultimately, under Ibrahim Inal’s command, the Turcomans achieved a decisive victory, during which many Byzantine soldiers were either killed, captured, or forced to retreat.

Following these successes, Ibrahim launched further attacks into different regions of Byzantine territory, even advancing to within a fifteen-day march of the Byzantine capital, Constantinople. As a result of the fighting, the Turcoman captured a significant amount of loot, including wild animals, wealth, and military supplies from the local population.

==== Establishing control in Azerbaijan and the South Caucasus ====
Map of Azarbaijan and its surroundings in the 9th and 10th-centuries

In 1054, Tughril Beg launched a military campaign aimed at the conquest of Azerbaijan (with Tabriz as its center). At the time, the region was under the rule of the Rawadid dynasty, specifically Amir Abu’l-Mansur Vahsudan ibn Muhammad. As Tughril's campaign began, Amir Abu’l-Mansur sent valuable gifts and his son as a hostage to Tughril, recognizing his sovereignty by having the khutbah read in his name and minting coins on his behalf. Tughril subsequently marched toward Ganja. The ruler of the city, Amir Abu’l-Aswar Shaddadid, also submitted to Tughril and had the khutbah read in his name. As a result, the other principalities in Azerbaijan also accepted Tughril’s authority. Tughril took hostages from them and confirmed the local rulers in their positions.

Tughril then launched a campaign toward the eastern Byzantine frontiers — corresponding to the western regions of modern-day South Caucasus. Abu’l-Aswar Shaddadid accompanied him during this expedition. Tughril’s main objective was the conquest of the city of Malazgirt. He laid siege to the city, plundered and devastated a nearby town called Hasna. Through the killing, plundering, and capture of many Byzantines, he succeeded in instilling fear and awe throughout the region. He advanced as far as Erzurum but was unable to capture Malazgirt. With the onset of winter, he returned to Azerbaijan. Although he declared that he would resume his campaign into Byzantine territories after winter, he returned to the city of Ray some time later.

=== Establishing strong relations with the Caliphate ===
In the year 447 AH (1055 CE), the Seljuk state entered a new phase in its military, political, social, and cultural development. Having crossed the borders of the Iranian plateau, the Seljuks entered Arab Iraq and began to play a decisive role in the governance of the Abbasid Caliphate. That same year, at the invitation of the Abbasid Caliph al-Qa'im bi-Amrillah, Sultan Tughril launched a military campaign to Baghdad and put an end to the Buyid dynasty. Tughril had the last Buyid ruler in Arab Iraq, Malik al-Rahim, arrested and thus eliminated the dynasty. Simultaneously, he expelled Arslan al-Basasiri, the commander of Turkic military forces in Baghdad. As a result of these events, Sultan Tughril and the Seljuk state significantly strengthened their authority and influence over the Caliphate’s territories.

==== The situation in Iraq on the eve of Tughril’s arrival ====
Arslan al-Basasiri, also known by the laqab Abū’l-Ḥārith, was one of the Turkic mamluks of Baha al-Dawla, son of ‘Adud al-Dawla. During the reign of Caliph al-Qa'im, he served as the commander of the Turkic army. His role as “commander of the Baghdad army” is explicitly documented in the works Rahat al-Sudur and Ayat al-Surur. Arslan, in fact, held a key administrative position as shahanshah of Baghdad (the chief of security and executive authority in the city). During the rule of the Buyid ruler Malik al-Rahim (1049), Arslan began acting as a provisional governor of Iraq. From 1050 onwards, he received control of parts of Anbar, Dazdar, and Wasit as iqṭāʿ, and was simultaneously appointed as the governor of Basra. His influence grew to such an extent that even the caliph could not take any action without his approval.

In Ramadan 1054, a conflict arose between Caliph al-Qa'im and Arslan, orchestrated by the caliph’s vizier Ibn al-Muslima. One of the main reasons for Arslan’s rebellious attitude was the vizier’s hostile stance toward Shi‘ites, particularly in the Karkh quarter of Baghdad, and his overt support for Sunnis. During this period, sectarian tensions in Baghdad escalated significantly. Supported by newly arrived Turks, Kurdish and Bedouin Arab forces began looting villages. Despite his efforts, Arslan failed to suppress these attacks. Meanwhile, Quraysh ibn Badran, leader of the Banu Uqayl tribe and ruler of Mosul, seized Anbar, confiscated Arslan’s property, and had the Friday sermon (khutba) recited in Sultan Tughril’s name. Arslan interpreted this event as the result of Ibn al-Muslima’s incitement and, in retaliation, suspended the salaries of the caliph, the vizier, and the officials of the Dār al-Khilāfa. Thus, tensions between the parties intensified further.

Although Basasiri repledged his allegiance to the caliph in 1056, the vizier accused him of treason. Following the caliph’s orders, Malik al-Rahim distanced himself from Arslan, and the vizier instructed the Turkic forces in Baghdad to loot Arslan’s property, family, and supporters. Humiliated by these events, Arslan was later condemned by the caliph due to his alleged correspondence with the Fatimid caliph al-Mustansir. This deepened the rift between Arslan and the Abbasid caliph. At this time, Tughril declared that he would come to Iraq under the pretext of performing the Hajj pilgrimage. According to Ibn Qalanisi, the caliph invited Tughril to Baghdad while Arslan was in Wasit, but Arslan arrived in the city before him and reportedly burned and looted part of the Dār al-Khilāfa. However, this event is not confirmed by other historians.

Fatimid dāʿī al-Mu’ayyad al-Shīrāzī reports that before Tughril's arrival in Baghdad, he sent letters to Tughril's vizier Amid al-Mulk Abu Nasr al-Kunduri, to Basasiri, and to the Baghdad army, inviting them to recognize Fatimid authority. Arslan is said to have received al-Mu’ayyad’s letter in the city of Rahba, which likely marks the beginning of his relations with the Fatimids. He promised that, if supported by the Fatimids, he would expel the Seljuk Turks from Iraq and hand control of the region over to the Fatimid Caliphate.

==== Tughril's first arrival in Baghdad and the end of the Buyid dynasty ====
In Muharram 447 AH, Sultan Tughril set out from Rayy toward Hamadan, with the intention of performing the Hajj pilgrimage, securing the road to Mecca, and eventually overthrowing the Fatimid caliph al-Mustansir in Syria and Egypt. He passed through Dinavar and Kermanshah, reaching the region of Hulwan. Meanwhile, upon learning that Tughril was approaching Baghdad, the Buyid ruler Malik al-Rahim departed from Wasit and arrived in the capital in the middle of Ramadan that year. During this time, both Tughril and Malik al-Rahim professed their loyalty and obedience to the caliph. Meanwhile, several commanders in Malik al-Rahim’s army sent letters to Tughril pledging allegiance and promised that the Friday sermon would be delivered in his name. In response to the caliph’s order, Baghdad's preachers began to mention Tughril's name in the khutba. Thus, on the 22nd of Ramadan 447 AH, Tughril’s name was officially pronounced in the sermon for the first time, and he was granted the honorific title “Rukn al-Dawla Abū Ṭālib Tughril Beg Muḥammad ibn Mikāʾīl.”

At that time, however, Basasiri's situation was different. By order of the caliph, Malik al-Rahim distanced himself from him, and Basasiri sought refuge in the territory of the Mazidid ruler Nur al-Dawla ibn Dubays ibn Mazid. Meanwhile, in response to the caliph’s request for assistance in suppressing Basasiri, Tughril advanced toward Baghdad. The Turkic troops under Basasiri, acting on the caliph’s order, revolted against their commanders to prevent giving Tughril a pretext for entering the city. These soldiers petitioned the caliph to send a message ordering Tughril to withdraw, but the caliph firmly refused, as his vizier regarded the collapse of Buyid rule as necessary and considered Tughril’s arrival essential for that purpose. At that point, the sermons mentioned Tughril’s name followed only by Malik al-Rahim’s titles—such as "al-Malik al-Rahim Abū Naṣr ibn Abī’l-Hayjā’ Sulṭān al-Dawla"—and according to some reports, his name was omitted altogether. Later, Tughril requested permission from the caliph to enter Baghdad, which was granted. While he was in Nahrawan, Tughril was informed that the caliph’s vizier, accompanied by numerous dignitaries—judges, naqibs, nobles, and palace officials—was coming to greet him. Some of Malik al-Rahim’s commanders also joined this delegation. In response, Tughril sent his vizier, Amid al-Mulk al-Kunduri, along with several commanders to receive them. During his meeting with Tughril, the caliph’s vizier Abū’l-Qāsim Muslimah delivered a letter from the caliph and took oaths of loyalty from him on behalf of the caliph, Malik al-Rahim, and the army commanders. Following these events, Tughril entered Baghdad on the 25th of Ramadan, 447 AH.

Shortly after, a minor incident sparked a clash between the people of Baghdad and Tughril’s army. This confrontation resulted in numerous deaths, injuries, and prisoners on both sides. The Turks exploited the situation to plunder the property of influential individuals and the tombs of former caliphs. Suspecting Malik al-Rahim's involvement in the uprising, Tughril sent a stern letter to the caliph demanding that Malik al-Rahim be handed over to him to prove his innocence. To gain their trust, he also sent a letter of assurance to Malik al-Rahim and his associates. Consequently, Malik al-Rahim, his close aides, and several representatives of the caliph went to meet Tughril. However, they were ambushed and looted by Turks en route. At the end of Ramadan, Malik al-Rahim and his companions were taken prisoner by Tughril’s order and later exiled to the fortress of Sirwan. With these events, the Buyid dynasty’s rule in Arab Iraq came to an end. In response to Tughril and the Turks' actions, the caliph sent a letter reminding Tughril of the guarantee he had given for the release of Malik al-Rahim and his companions and stated that Tughril would have to leave Baghdad if they were not freed. Nevertheless, the caliph also acknowledged that Tughril’s actions were intended to preserve the dignity of the caliphate. In reply, Tughril released some prisoners but refused to free Malik al-Rahim and even seized his iqṭāʿ. Afterward, Seljuk troops dispersed throughout Baghdad and continued to loot the city, which consequently suffered extensive damage. However, under Tughril’s orders, Baghdad was later restored, and its territory even expanded. The decision to imprison Malik al-Rahim was taken with the implicit approval of the caliph. In other words, Tughril ended Buyid rule in Iraq by imprisoning Malik al-Rahim after remaining in Baghdad for a time. However, Arslan al-Basasiri still remained at large. To further strengthen relations between the Seljuks and the Abbasid Caliphate, in 448 AH (1056 CE), the caliph married his daughter Arslan Khatun Khadija to Chaghri Beg’s son. The marriage ceremony was attended by al-Kunduri, a group of local notables, and Tughril’s military commanders. The nikah was conducted in the presence of the vizier, renowned scholars, and judges.

=== Beginning of the first conflicts between Tughril and Arslan ===
==== Arslan’s relations with the Fatimids ====
There are numerous contradictory accounts in the available sources regarding Arslan al-Basasiri’s relations with Fatimid Egypt. According to Ibn al-Sayrafi, Arslan intended to travel to Egypt and even made the journey, receiving financial support from the Egyptian vizier Yazuri to wage war against Tughril and the Caliph of Baghdad. According to Fazlullah Rashid al-Din, Arslan fled from Dubays ibn Mazid and traveled to Egypt, where he pledged to overthrow the Abbasids, gained Fatimid support, and set out for Baghdad.

However, according to al-Maqrizi, although Arslan had appealed to Egypt, he was not granted entry. On the other hand, al-Mu’ayyad fi’l-Din al-Shirazi states that in 448 AH (1056 CE), such a large amount of money was sent to him that the Egyptian treasury was nearly emptied. Caliph al-Mustansir even granted Arslan authority over the province of Rahba so that he could fight against the Turks and take control of Iraq. Al-Mu’ayyad not only provided financial and military support to Arslan, but also presented him with a robe of honor (khilʿa) inscribed with the name of al-Mustansir, a formal covenant, and a letter from the Fatimid caliph. In this letter, al-Mustansir expressed his respect and honor for Arslan and officially appointed him as the Fatimid representative in Iraq to combat the Abbasids.

==== Arslan’s capture of Tikrit and Mosul, and the events that followed ====
===== Confrontation between Arslan, Nur al-Dawla, and Quraysh ibn Badran, and the conflict with Qutalmish =====
In the year 1057, a battle took place in Sinjar in which Arslan and Nur al-Dawla, son of Dubays ibn Mazid, fought on one side, while Quraysh ibn Badran and Qutalmish, cousin of Sultan Tughril, were on the other. As a result of the battle, the forces of Quraysh and Qutalmish suffered a severe defeat. It is worth noting that during this battle, Qutalmish and his army sustained significant losses inflicted by the local population of Sinjar. After this event, Quraysh ibn Badran sought refuge with Nur al-Dawla and accepted the robe of honor sent by the Fatimid caliph al-Mustansir, thereby aligning himself with their supporters. Prior to the battle, correspondence had taken place between the Fatimid caliph, Basasiri, and Nur al-Dawla, resulting in the dispatch of robes of honor to several prominent figures who had distanced themselves from the Abbasids, including Arslan and Nur al-Dawla. After Quraysh joined their ranks, Arslan and Nur al-Dawla proceeded to Mosul, where they had the Friday sermon (khutba) proclaimed in the name of the Fatimid caliph al-Mustansir billah.

===== Tughril’s seizure of Tikrit and Mosul, and the reaction of Nur al-Dawla and Quraysh ibn Badran =====
Due to his prolonged stay in Baghdad and the harm inflicted by his troops upon the local population, the Abbasid caliph requested that Tughril leave the city. Upon receiving news of developments in Mosul, Tughril departed Baghdad in 1057, after remaining there for thirteen months. During this period, communications and negotiations between the caliph and Tughril were conducted through their respective viziers, and they did not meet directly. Tughril and his forces looted the villages and towns along their route and eventually reached Tikrit. After Tikrit’s governor declared his loyalty to Tughril, and Tughril’s nephew Yaquti joined him, the Seljuks advanced toward Mosul and captured the city.

Soon thereafter, Nur al-Dawla ibn Dubays and Quraysh ibn Badran accepted Tughril’s authority. In return, Tughril reinstated their former territories. As for Arslan, Tughril left the decision regarding his fate to the caliph and distanced himself from the matter. Meanwhile, following the defection of his allies to Tughril’s side, Arslan marched to Rahba with his army. Shortly afterward, fearing Ibrahim Inal, Nur al-Dawla and Quraysh fled and joined Arslan. However, Arslan did not regard their move as significant. Ultimately, Nur al-Dawla returned to his territory, while Quraysh and his son remained with Arslan.

=== Continued conquests in the Jazira region ===
Following the aforementioned conquests, Tughril's attention turned toward Diyarbakir. This region was under the rule of a man named Ibn Marwan. He expressed his submission to Tughril by sending him gifts and having the Friday sermon (khutba) delivered in his name. However, some time later, Tughril laid siege to the territory of Jazirat Ibn ‘Umar, which was under Ibn Marwan’s control, with the aim of annexing it. In response, Ibn Marwan referred to his position on the frontier and his ongoing jihad against infidels and promised to pay a certain amount of tribute to Tughril. As a result, Tughril lifted the siege, although the region came under his nominal authority. During this time, Ibrahim Inal was ceremonially welcomed by the local notables and inhabitants of the region and joined Tughril. Shortly thereafter, having received complaints from Qutalmish that the people of Sinjar had inflicted damage upon his army, Tughril besieged Sinjar and took control of the city. Subsequently, Tughril entrusted the administration of Sinjar, Mosul, and surrounding areas to Ibrahim Inal and returned to Baghdad toward the end of the year 1057.

=== The Expansion of Tughril’s Relations with the Caliphate ===
When Tughril reached a location called Qafṣ, near Baghdad, the Caliph’s vizier, Abu’l-Qasim ibn Muslimah, left the city to greet him. Upon approaching Qafṣ, some of Tughril’s leading commanders, along with his vizier al-Kunduri, also came to meet him. The vizier presented himself before Tughril with great respect, conveyed the greetings of the caliph, and presented him with valuable gifts, including a golden vessel filled with precious stones. At Tughril’s request to meet with the caliph, al-Qa’im bi-Amrillah appeared for a public audience on the 25th of Dhu’l-Qaʿda, 1058. Tughril approached the palace in a boat escorted by several others and was brought to the palace riding one of the caliph’s horses. Upon entering, he paid his respects to the caliph and was seated on a designated throne. Through his vizier, the caliph expressed his gratitude and satisfaction with Tughril’s actions and encouraged him to uphold justice and piety. He also granted Tughril administrative authority over his territories. Following this, Tughril was invited to the khilʿa chamber of the palace, where he donned a robe of honor in the presence of the caliph. Subsequently, he was conferred with the title “King of the East and the West” (Malik al-Mashriq wa’l-Maghrib). At the conclusion of the ceremony, Tughril reciprocated by sending the caliph valuable gifts from outside the palace.

A more detailed account of the ceremony is as follows:

During the ceremony, the caliph presented Tughril with a crown, a necklace, bracelets, and seven black robes — symbolizing the sovereignty over the seven climes. Additionally, he was honored with a gold-embroidered dastār scented with musk, symbolizing the Arab crown and royal authority. Tughril then exited the khilʿa chamber and proceeded to the caliphal palace. Adorned with the crown, dastār, a golden sword, and various precious ornaments, he seated himself ceremonially on the throne that had been designated for him. Intending to express his gratitude to the caliph by performing prostration (sujūd), he found himself unable to do so because of the crown on his head. He therefore sought the caliph’s permission to instead clasp his hand twice, kiss it, and place it upon his eyes. The caliph responded by bestowing upon him another sword — thus, Tughril wore two swords — and formally granted him authority over both the East and the West, declaring him “Sovereign of the East and the West.

=== Confrontation between Tughril and Ibrahim Inal ===
==== Origins of the conflict and initial clash ====
In the administrative structure of the Central Asian Turks, which was rooted in a nomadic lifestyle, the khagan—i.e., the leader of the Turks—did not possess absolute authority. However, after the Seljuks established their rule over Iran and Tughril Bey became acquainted with monarchical governance, he began to view this system as aligning with his own aspirations. Consequently, he started perceiving other notables as his subordinates. Ibrahim Inal, on the other hand, had played a significant role in the Seljuk victories as the leader of Turcoman groups known as the "Inali"s and had notably contributed to the expansion of Seljuk territories westward and in campaigns into Asia Minor. He could not tolerate Tughril's unilateral decision-making and autocratic rule. Therefore, in 1050, he refused to comply with Tughril’s order granting him a province comprising Hamadan and the fortresses in the Jibal region. Simultaneously, he took harsh punitive measures against the vizier Abu Ali, who was suspected of instigating discord between them. Following this, he launched a serious military campaign against Tughril. However, he was defeated in this confrontation and retreated, leading to the areas under his control falling into Tughril’s hands. Ibrahim took refuge in the fortress of Sarmaj in the Jibal region and continued his rebellion. After a four-day siege by Tughril’s numerous troops, the fortress was captured and Ibrahim surrendered. Brought before Tughril, Ibrahim was treated mercifully. The majority of his former lands were returned to him, and he was given the freedom to either return to his iqtaʿ lands or remain in Tughril’s service. He chose the latter and continued to serve in Tughril’s army..

==== Rise of Ibrahim Inal’s influence ====
After 1050, Ibrahim Inal gained significant influence through the valuable services he rendered by Tughril’s side. One notable indication of this influence is the following account:

In 1049, when Tughril laid siege to the fortress of Ibn Umar in the Jazira region, Ibrahim Inal joined him there and criticized the cautious and respectful conduct of Amid al-Mulk Kunduri. In response, Amid al-Mulk said: “You may now do as you wish, for you are the deputy of the sultan.” This statement reveals that Ibrahim Inal held a position equivalent to Tughril’s deputy at that time and had acquired considerable influence within the court.

==== Renewed tensions and final confrontation ====
In 1059, Ibrahim Inal left Mosul with the aim of moving toward the Jibal region. Tughril Beg interpreted this as an act of rebellion and demanded his return to Baghdad. The caliph also sent a letter to Ibrahim urging him to return. These appeals led Ibrahim to rejoin Tughril; there, he was welcomed cordially by Vizier Amid al-Mulk Kunduri and was presented with a ceremonial robe (khilʿa) by the caliph. After Ibrahim’s departure from Mosul, Arslan Basasiri and Quraysh ibn Badran were appointed to rule the region. During this time, owing to the celebration of Nowruz, most of Tughril’s soldiers had returned to their homelands, leaving him with only about two thousand cavalry. Upon learning of the situation, he marched toward Mosul, but Arslan and Quraysh had already vacated the city. Tughril then set off in pursuit toward Nisibin. At this point, Ibrahim refused to proceed alongside Tughril and instead set out toward Hamadan, entering the city in Ramadan of 450 AH (1059). According to sources, the Fatimids had established contact with Ibrahim during this period. Additionally, it is reported that Arslan tried to deceive him with a promise of enthronement to use him for his own objectives. Although Tughril came to Hamadan in pursuit of Ibrahim, he refrained from engaging in battle due to the latter’s large army and the support he had received from his nephews—Muhammad and Ahmad, the sons of Ardash—while Tughril’s forces remained few in number. Tughril then withdrew to Rey and wrote to his nephew Alp Arslan, as well as to Yaquti and Qavurt—the sons of Chaghri Beg—seeking assistance. They joined Tughril with a large army. Finally, in 1060, a battle took place near Rey between Tughril and Ibrahim. The battle resulted in Ibrahim’s defeat and his capture by Alp Arslan. His nephews were likewise taken prisoner. Ibrahim was handed over to Tughril Bey and, on the same day, executed by strangulation with a bowstring at Tughril’s command. His nephews were also executed alongside him.

=== Final confrontation between Tughril Beg and Arslan al-Basasiri ===
==== Arslan’s activities in Tughril’s absence ====
While Tughril Bey was pursuing Ibrahim Inal, Arslan took advantage of the situation and entered Baghdad in 1059. His arrival was met with resistance from the city’s military commander Amid al-‘Iraq, his forces, and the local populace—including the residents of streets and markets—but ultimately, Arslan overcame this opposition and secured victory. He had the Friday sermon (khuṭba) recited in the name of the Fatimid caliph al-Mustansir Billah in the Jami‘ Mosque located in the Mansur district. In addition, he ordered the Shi‘i formula “Ḥayya ‘ala khayr al-‘amal” to be inserted into the call to prayer (adhan). After entering Baghdad, Arslan and his army set up camp in a place called Zahir, and on the first Friday following his entry, the khuṭba was again recited in al-Mustansir’s name in the Rusafa mosque.

During this period, a series of clashes erupted between Arslan's supporters and those loyal to the Abbasid caliphate. Many Shi‘a and Sunnis, objecting to the harsh treatment they had received due to their sectarian affiliation and ethnic background, came to support Arslan. This shift turned the tide against the Abbasid loyalists. Amid al-‘Iraq appealed to the caliph’s vizier to delay military confrontation until Tughril’s return, but the vizier rejected this suggestion and instead sent a qadi from Hamadan—Qadi Hamadani—to lead the fight. Thanks to Arslan’s superior military tactics, this clash ended in his victory. Subsequently, one of Baghdad’s neighborhoods and then the caliph’s palace were looted. Other parts of the city also fell under the control of Arslan’s supporters. When the caliph sought help from Amid al-‘Iraq, the latter sought protection from Quraysh ibn Badran, who was allied with Arslan. Eventually, the caliph and his vizier were compelled to seek clemency from Quraysh and came under his protection. Following this, Arslan asked Quraysh whether their cooperation would continue. Quraysh expressed his willingness to maintain the alliance. Soon after, the caliph’s vizier Abu’l-Qasim Muslimah was handed over to Arslan and, on his orders, was brutally executed. Amid al-‘Iraq was also killed by Arslan. The caliph was initially kept in Quraysh ibn Badran’s camp and later handed over, at Arslan’s command, to Quraysh’s cousin Muharij ibn Mujli, governor of the Haditha region. Muharij then transferred the caliph to the city of Anah in Haditha.

On another occasion, during Eid al-Adha, Arslan set out on horseback for the Baghdad prayer ground (musalla) for the Eid prayer, surrounded by Fatimid banners. During this procession, he treated the people, including scholars of different sects and the caliph’s mother, with respect and courtesy. Later, he marched on the cities of Wasit and Basra and took control of these regions. Although he initially planned to advance into Ahvaz, he refrained from doing so after reaching an agreement with the local governor, Hazar Asb ibn Bakkar, and returned to Wasit in 1059.

==== Tughril returns the caliph to Baghdad ====
After resolving the issue with Ibrahim Inal, Tughril Beg moved toward Arab Iraq to restore the caliph to his capital. He sent a letter to Arslan and Quraysh ibn Badran, offering to refrain from entering Iraq if the caliph was returned to his place and if the khuṭba and coins were once again issued in Tughril’s name. However, Arslan rejected this offer, prompting Tughril to advance into Iraq. Arslan and his supporters evacuated the region in 1059. Tughril then entered Baghdad and sent a respected scholar to Quraysh ibn Badran to express his gratitude for the kindness shown to the caliph’s wife, who was the daughter of Chaghri Beg, and demanded the return of the caliph to Baghdad.

As a result, the caliph was brought to a region under the authority of Badr ibn Muhallal and was received by officials including Amid al-Mulk Kunduri and other notable figures sent by Tughril. When the caliph reached Nahrawan on the 24th of Dhu al-Qa‘dah, Tughril went to meet him, expressed satisfaction upon seeing him in good health, and pledged to pursue Arslan and undertake military operations against the Fatimid caliph al-Mustansir Billah. The caliph then ceremoniously girded Tughril with a sword and praised him. Tughril entered Baghdad ahead of the caliph and, on the 25th of Dhu al-Qa‘dah, accompanied the caliph to his residence. In return for his services, the caliph praised Tughril and addressed him with the honorific "Irkab ya Rukn al-Din." Previously, Tughril had been known by the title “Rukn al-Dawla,” and this shift to “Rukn al-Din” signified recognition of his struggle against the Fatimid caliphate.

==== Final confrontation between Tughril and Arslan ====
Tughril appointed Khumartakin Tughragini as commander of the army and sent him to Kufa, following behind shortly thereafter. He caught Arslan and Dabbis ibn Mazid by surprise. Dabbis retreated to the Batihah region, but Arslan engaged Tughril in battle. Eventually, after some of his supporters were captured, Arslan was killed, and his head was sent to Tughril. In 1059, Tughril presented the head to the caliph. With this victory, the Abbasid caliphate was saved from a serious threat, and Tughril gained immense prestige for his critical role in its restoration.

According to another report, Arslan fled Baghdad upon Tughril’s arrival. His allies—including Fatimid caliph al-Mustansir, Dabbis Mazidi, and Quraysh ‘Aqili—also withdrew their support. In 451 AH / 1059 CE, Arslan was captured by Ghumushtakin, a mamluk of Amid al-Mulk Kunduri, and executed. His head was sent to Baghdad.

=== Tughril’s other political and military activities ===
Following the Baghdad affair, Tughril proceeded toward the city of Wasit. During the campaign, Dabbis ibn Mazid came into Tughril’s service and declared his allegiance through Hazarasp ibn Bani Kir. Tughril granted Wasit, which had an annual revenue of two hundred thousand dinars, to Abu ʿAli ibn Fazlan, and bestowed Basra as a tiyul (benefice) upon Agharr Abu Saʿd Shapur ibn Muzaffar. He advanced as far as the Batihah region and returned to Baghdad in 1061, accompanied by several notables and dignitaries. He met with the caliph and attended a ceremonial event held in his honor. Later, he granted the administration of Baghdad for a period of three years, in return for four hundred thousand dinars, to Abu’l-Fath Muzaffar, and entrusted the city’s military command to the amir Barsaq. In 1061, Tughril left Baghdad and traveled to the region of Jibal. Additionally, he had entrusted the administration of Azerbaijan to Mamlān, the son of Vahsudan.

After leaving Arab Iraq in 1061, Tughril marched toward Azerbaijan and entered Tabriz. Qutalmish was sent in his name to the regions of Mosul and Diyar Rabiʿa. In the same year, by Tughril’s order, Mahmud ibn Akhram Khafaji was appointed mirab (water administrator) over the lands of Banu Khafajah, Kufa, and the Euphrates.

== Tughril’s authority over the Caliphate ==
Tughril Bey recognized only the spiritual authority of the Abbasid caliphs while opposing their political influence, especially in light of his significant accomplishments: ending the Buyid state’s dominance over Arab Iraq, suppressing local rebellions and bandit groups, and resisting the growing influence of the Fatimid Caliphate in the region. In accordance with the political doctrine followed by Tughril and his advisers, the caliph’s spiritual status was acknowledged, but his interference in matters of governance was not tolerated; all executive and administrative power was to remain within the sultan’s domain. From this perspective, their policy aimed at diminishing and restricting the temporal authority of the caliph. For example, determining the caliph’s material entitlements and preventing him from exercising control over the Muslim public treasury (bayt al-mal) were among the measures taken in this framework.

To further reinforce the revival of the Abbasid caliphate and secure a future military presence in the region, Tughril requested revenues from certain areas after restoring the caliph to Baghdad. He tasked his adviser, Amid al-Mulk al-Kunduri, with delivering this request. Amid al-Mulk prepared for the mission and set out to appear before the caliph. On the way, he encountered the caliph’s vizier, Abu’l-Qasim ibn Muslimah, who was also carrying a message requesting financial assistance from Tughril. They proceeded together to Tughril’s presence and explained the situation. Realizing that Amid al-Mulk had prior knowledge of the matter, Tughril entrusted him with the management of the issue. Based on the legal codes of Baghdad, Amid al-Mulk established the financial entitlements and limitations of the caliph. As a result, the caliph became increasingly dependent on Tughril’s will and was compelled to comply with his demands following this incident.

=== Tughril’s position in relation with the Caliphate ===
The significance of relations with the Abbasid caliphate was evident to the Seljuks even before their full integration into the Islamic world. Their early actions demonstrate the value they placed on this relationship. For instance, in a letter addressed to the governor of Syria, the Seljuk commanders referred to themselves as “slaves of the Commander of the Faithful.” After the conquest of Nishapur, when the caliph requested that the city not be plundered, Tughril paid forty thousand dinars to his brother Chaghri Beg to prevent the looting and thus secured the caliph’s satisfaction. Following their victory at the Battle of Dandanaqan, the Seljuks sent a letter to the caliph explaining their situation and seeking formal recognition of their authority—clearly indicating their desire for legitimacy from the caliph. In 1055, with Tughril’s entry into Baghdad and the end of Buyid rule, the Seljuks emerged as the principal political force at the center of the Abbasid caliphate. However, unlike their Shi‘i Buyid predecessors, they did not overtly alter the framework of relations with the caliphate. Though some differences can be observed under the reign of later rulers, the need for the caliph’s spiritual legitimacy remained. As with earlier regimes, the Seljuks ensured the legality of their rule through the caliph’s formal approval and the delivery of the Friday sermon (khutba) in their names. Due to his spiritual prestige and influence over the Sunni population, the caliph was regarded as the final arbiter of legitimacy—a status that even the Shi‘i Buyids had to acknowledge. The Seljuks adhered to this principle as well. For example, the way Tughril approached the caliph and conducted their relations closely resembled the behavior of the Buyid ruler Adud al-Dawla. Tughril’s marriage alliance with the caliph—by giving his niece in marriage—was also a symbolic union between religious and political authority. However, a significant departure in Tughril’s conduct was his proposal to marry the caliph’s own daughter. Initially, the caliph opposed this union, but under the pressure of Tughril’s military and political power, the marriage ultimately took place.

=== Marriage to the Caliph’s Daughter ===
Tughril’s wife died in the city of Zanjan and was buried in Rayy. Following this event, Tughril instructed Abu Sa‘id, who had been sent to Rayy, to convey to the caliph his desire to marry either his daughter or his sister. Although sources differ on the precise details of this episode, there is general agreement that the caliph initially opposed this request.

This opposition stemmed from the unprecedented nature of a caliphal daughter being married to a sultan—a situation without prior example. Upon hearing of the proposal, the caliph became angered and, through his envoy Abu Muhammad al-Tamimi, offered Tughril two options: either abandon the marriage proposal, send the caliph 300,000 dinars, and surrender the revenues of Wasit and its surrounding areas; or forget the idea of marriage altogether. At first, Tughril decided to reject the offer. However, as al-Kunduri informed him, such a refusal might be interpreted as a sign of weakness. Consequently, Tughril opted to formally accept the caliph’s proposal.

To this end, al-Kunduri, accompanied by Arslan Khatun—the wife of the caliph—went to the caliphal court, carrying numerous gifts and ornaments. After presenting Tughril’s gifts, Arslan Khatun informed the caliph that Tughril had accepted some of his conditions, while rejecting others. The caliph, displeased by this selective acceptance, chose not to respond and expressed his dissatisfaction. He even threatened to leave Baghdad if Tughril did not abandon the marriage proposal. At this point, the caliph ordered that his camp be relocated to the Nahrawan region. Nevertheless, senior figures at court warned the caliph of the potential consequences of such an action. The vizier Ibn Daris hosted a banquet for al-Kunduri in an attempt to defuse the tension.

The caliph’s displeasure arose mainly from Arslan Khatun's report that Tughril had not fully accepted the caliph’s conditions. After al-Kunduri failed to appease the caliph, Tughril departed for Hamadan. Upon learning of the situation, he wrote to the elders of the caliphate, complaining about the caliph’s lack of gratitude for his services. He also requested the return of his niece Arslan Khatun, who had been married to the caliph. Following this, al-Kunduri halted the payment of salaries to the caliph’s household. As a result, the caliph was forced to concede and approved Tughril’s marriage proposal under pressure. He sent a letter granting permission for the marriage.

As a result of these developments, the marriage contract between Tughril and the caliph’s daughter was concluded in 1062 on the outskirts of Tabriz. Tughril sent numerous gifts to the caliph, his daughter, and other members of the caliphal family. Most sources report that the dowry (mahr) of the caliph’s daughter (or possibly his sister) mirrored that of Prophet Muhammad’s daughter Fatima, consisting of 400 silver dirhams and one gold dinar. In 1061, after Tughril departed for the South Caucasus, Kunduri proposed to the caliph that the marriage ceremony be performed. The caliph, however, referred to the written commitments previously made by Kunduri, asserting that the marriage was intended solely to increase Tughril’s political prestige and that no conjugal cohabitation was envisaged. If Tughril wished to see his wife, the caliph stated he could receive her within the palace. In 1062, Tughril went to the caliphal palace in Baghdad to visit the caliph’s daughter, bringing many gifts. However, the bride did not greet him, nor did she unveil herself in his presence. Despite this, Tughril continued to visit her several times and treated her kindly, but his efforts bore no fruit. Ultimately, in 1061, Tughril decided to return to Rayy. He severed ties with the caliph and suspended his stipend. In response, the caliph sent his daughter, along with the Chief Judge (Qadi al-Qudat) of Baghdad, to Tabriz. Tughril welcomed his bride in Tabriz, decorated the city, and presented lavish gifts. The marriage ceremony was conducted by the Chief Judge.

== Death ==
Tughril set out for the city of Rayy with the intention of holding his marriage ceremony there. However, he fell ill near Rayy. Due to the hot weather, he stayed in the village of Tajrish, which had a cooler climate. A few days later, in the month of Ramadan in the year 455 AH (1063), after a 26-year reign and at the age of 70, Tughril died before the marriage could take place. He was buried in Rayy, in the Tughril Tower.

== Family ==
One of his wives was Altun Jan Khatun, a Turk from Khwarazm. She had previously been married to Amirshah Malik and had a son named Anushirvan from that marriage. Her union with Tughril likely took place around 1043. Altun Jan Khatun died in December 1060. Another of his wives was Akka Khatun. After Tughril’s death, she married Alp Arslan. He also married the daughter of Abu Kalijar. This marriage occurred around 1047–1048. Another of his wives was Farrokh al-Khatun, the widow of Tughril’s brother Chaghri Beg and the mother of his son Suleiman. She married Tughril after Chaghri Beg’s death in 1060.

Another wife of Tughril was Sayyida Khatun, the daughter of the Abbasid Caliph al-Qa’im. In 1061, Tughril sent the qadi of Rayy as an envoy to Baghdad to seek her hand in marriage. The marriage contract was concluded near Tabriz in August–September 1062, with a dowry set at 100,000 dinars. She was brought to the sultan’s palace in March–April 1063. After Tughril’s death, Alp Arslan sent her back to Baghdad in 1064. In 1094, Caliph al-Mustazhir expelled her from the palace and forced her to reside in a private home, as she was suspected of being involved in conspiracies against the caliph. Sayyida Khatun died on October 20, 1102.

Mas'ud, after having returned to Khorasan, expelled the Seljuks from Herat and Nishapur. He soon marched towards Merv to completely remove the Seljuk threat from Khorasan. His army included 50,000 men and 12 to 60 war elephants.

The Battle of Dandanaqan shortly took place near Merv, where the army of Mas'ud was defeated by a smaller army under Tughril, his brother Chaghri Beg, and the Kakuyid prince Faramurz. Mas'ud thus permanently lost control of all of western Khorasan. This victory marked the foundation of the Seljuk Empire, which was now rapidly expanding west.

Tughril then installed Chagri as the governor of Khorasan and prevented a Ghaznavid reconquest, then moved on to the conquest of the Iranian plateau from 1040 to 1044; in 1041–1042, Tughril conquered Tabaristan and Gurgan, and appointed a certain Mardavij ibn Bishui as the governor of the region. In 1042/3, he conquered Ray and Qazvin, and at the same his suzerainty was acknowledged by the Justanid ruler of Daylam. The Sallarid ruler of Shamiran also shortly acknowledged his overlordship. In 1054, Tughril forced the Rawadid ruler of Azerbaijan, Abu Mansur Wahsudan, to acknowledge his authority. Tughril's name was placed in the khutba (Friday prayer), while a son of Wahsudan, possibly Abu'l-Hayja Manuchihr, was sent as a Seljuk hostage to Khurasan. In the same year, Tughril's forces were contending in Anatolia with the Byzantines.

In 1055 he was commissioned by the Abbasid Caliph Al-Qa'im to recapture Baghdad from the Buyids. A revolt by Turcoman forces under his foster brother İbrahim Yinal and the efforts of Buyid forces led to the loss of the city to the Fatimid Caliph in 1058. Two years later Tughril crushed the rebellion, personally strangling İbrahim with his bowstring and entered Baghdad. He then married the daughter of the Abbasid Caliph near the city of Tabriz.

== Government structure ==
=== Means of gaining legitimacy ===
According to Maryam Muezzzi and Sümeyye Shaban, throughout the centuries, ruling states employed various strategies to establish their legitimacy, which enabled them to gain popular acceptance and maintain political continuity. In pre-Seljuk periods, one of the most common methods of legitimization was for rulers and elites to associate themselves with ancient kings or their commanders, often by fabricating genealogies. Through such means, they sought to secure legal and moral grounds for their authority. However, Tughril Beg employed several alternative methods to gain legitimacy and, as a result, succeeded in establishing a long-lasting and sustainable political authority. These methods can be summarized as follows:

Securing the endorsement of contemporary legal scholars

It may be argued that Tughril’s first step toward legitimization was to gain the approval of the fuqaha (Islamic jurists). This phase was generally realized through a model known as “sovereignty through emirate.” According to the recognized legitimization model of that time, states would seize territories by military force, and the caliphate, in the interest of preserving social order and unity, would recognize these states and grant them legitimacy. As such, all military leaders and rulers who had achieved victories were considered to have secured preliminary approval from the caliphate. If they abided by religious law, preserved the caliph’s authority, and fairly collected religious taxes, they were supported by the jurists.

Obtaining formal recognition from the Caliphate

Following endorsement from religious scholars, Tughril sought the approval and favor of the caliph himself. He showed deference to the caliph, rescued him from the pressures of the Buyids and Arslan, and offered material support. In doing so, Tughril managed to receive an official recognition of his government directly from the caliph. He clearly understood that the vast majority of the population adhered to the Sunni tradition, and thus the caliph’s religious authority held significant weight. These actions led to a warming of relations with the Abbasid caliph and resulted in official recognition.

Gaining popular support

Tughril subsequently sought to earn the support of influential figures, scholars, and the leading strata of society. He regularly met with such individuals, treated their opinions with respect, and considered their advice in political matters. He appointed some of them to his advisory council and involved them in the administrative process. For instance, even though Abu’l-Hasan al-Mawardi had plotted against him, Tughril forgave and received him with honor. He also showed special reverence to prominent figures such as Baba Tahir. According to Moazzi and Shaban, Tughril undertook all these actions out of a deep understanding of the societal influence of such individuals.

Fulfilling religioua duties

One of the key steps Tughril took toward legitimacy was to foreground religious values, remain committed to acts of worship, and present himself as a ruler aligned with Islamic ideals. He was attentive to core religious practices such as prayer and fasting, performed recommended acts like giving alms, and commissioned the construction of new mosques. Tughril sought to portray himself as a servant of religion. Moreover, during conflicts with the Byzantine Empire, he referred to his campaigns as ghazawat (holy expeditions). On one such campaign, he captured a Byzantine vassal and later pardoned him. In return for this clemency, the vassal undertook initiatives beneficial to Muslims, such as renovating mosques and facilitating prayer in his territory. Such actions further reinforced Tughril’s legitimacy within the Muslim community, culminating in his name being included in the Friday sermon (khutbah) and peace treaties being concluded in his name.

Securing the favor of the Sunni majority

In order to win the favor of the predominantly Sunni Muslim population, Tughril implemented strict policies against other sects and religions. He exerted pressure on Shiites, prohibited the use of the Shiite call to prayer phrase “Hayya 'ala khayr al-'amal” and enforced the use of Sunni expressions instead. In particular, he targeted Ismaili Shiites. Later, he also implemented harsh measures against Zoroastrians and Christians, removing them from key governmental positions and favoring Sunni Muslims, especially adherents of the Shafi‘i and Hanbali schools of thought.

Divine illumination (farr-i īzadī)

Tughril understood the importance of appealing to the ancient political and religious beliefs of the people in order to establish rule over them. He portrayed his accession to power as a divine favor bestowed by God and the Prophet, claiming that he had seen the Prophet in a dream, who had conveyed divine approval for his reign. He attempted to support this claim with verses from the Qur’an. These efforts led to his perception by the people as a ruler endowed with supernatural qualities, and he came to be recognized as possessing the Farreh-i Izadi (Divine Radiance). Tughril portrayed the Ghaznavid ruler Mas‘ud as a wine-obsessed and pleasure-seeking figure, devoid of spiritual leadership. The prevailing belief at the time — that a ruler without divine radiance was doomed to fail — harmonized with the cultural emphasis on destiny (qismat). As such, Mas‘ud’s defeat by Tughril was interpreted by the public as the result of his estrangement from divine favor, which in turn further solidified Tughril’s legitimacy.

=== Military structure ===
As the leader of Turcoman tribes, Tughril relied on the military power of mounted archers who had grown up in the steppes of Central Asia, learning horseback riding and archery as part of their nomadic lifestyle of herding and hunting. Compared to the armed forces of sedentary states, these warriors held clear advantages. They were relatively easy to mobilize and required fewer resources. No sedentary state at the time could rival their speed and flexibility in deploying such mobile units. The bows they used were superior to all pre-firearm weapons in terms of precision, range, penetrative power, and shooting speed. However, these warriors only obeyed the Khan’s command on the battlefield and, based on tribal traditions, did not recognize the authority of even the most powerful ruler outside of war. As a result, many of them did not willingly accept Tughril’s sovereignty, and this lack of centralized control became both an embarrassing and challenging situation for Tughril and other Seljuk rulers.

== Personal character ==
=== Personal traits ===
The opinions of historical sources regarding the character of rulers cannot always be considered fully reliable; however, repetition of certain attributes may indicate a degree of truth. In the work "Zubdat al-Tawarikh," Tughril was described as brave, patient, generous, consistently devoted to worship, regular in Friday prayers, and fasting on Mondays and Thursdays. He is portrayed as possessing high moral character, extremely tolerant, measured in speech, eager to show generosity, and enthusiastic about constructing mosques. Tughril is noted to have followed the Hanafi school of Islamic jurisprudence. Furthermore, sources state that he showed restraint before the famous jurist Ali ibn Muhammad, also known as al-Mawardi, even after obtaining a letter that Mawardi had written against him to the Caliph. Tughril treated him with respect. It is also reported that Tughril turned a blind eye when one of his close officials revealed his secrets to the Buyid emir Abu Kalijar. Muhammad ibn Ali al-Rawandi narrates a meeting between Tughril and the famous Sufi poet Baba Tahir, who addressed him:

Ey Turk, how will you treat the servants of God?" Tughril replied, "I will do what you command." Baba Tahir answered, "Do what God commands." Tughril, moved to tears, responded, "I shall do so." Al-Rawandi further emphasizes Tughril’s religiosity, noting that his faith and religious conviction were so strong that no one surpassed him in piety and alertness in the religion of Muhammad (peace be upon him).

In the work "Manzaratu’l-Insan," Tughril was described as gentle, generous, and consistently praying with the people. He fasted on Mondays and Thursdays, gave charity, and built mosques. Bandari writes about Tughril and his rule:

During his reign, the country resembled a blooming garden. He disliked bloodshed and avoided giving such orders.

However, Ibn al-Athir cites a letter sent by Chaghri Beg to Tughril criticizing the devastation caused by Tughril’s conquests. Chaghri Beg reminded him of their past hardships and advised against such behavior. In his reply, Tughril pointed out the dilapidated state of the Khorasan territories under Chaghri's control and explained that military necessities made such measures unavoidable. While listing many of Tughril’s virtues, Ibn al-Athir also describes him as oppressive, ruthless, and cold-hearted. He notes that Tughril’s army often plundered people's property and was engaged in looting day and night.

Faruk Sümer comments on Tughril’s character as follows:

Sources present Tughril Beg as a ruler who disliked bloodshed, was merciful, noble in conduct, forgiving of mistakes, patient, humble, generous, honest, and pious. Imad al-Din al-Isfahani compares his reign to blooming gardens. His main goals were to secure the pilgrimage routes and to end the Fatimid state to unify the Islamic world. He worked hard to convey that looting was not a sustainable way of life. He became so furious at Chaghri Beg’s insistence on the plunder of Nishapur that he threatened to kill himself if it continued. Despite spending much of his time in warfare, he also focused on development, commissioning mosques and madrasas in cities like Nishapur, Ray, Isfahan, and Baghdad.

Tughril was praised by many poets and literary figures. Fakhr al-Din As’ad Gurgani wrote a eulogy for him in the introduction of his work "Vis and Ramin," and Ibn Hassul presented his work "Kitab Tafdil al-Atrak ‘ala sa’ir al-ajnad" to be read to Tughril by Amid al-Mulk Kunduri. Between 1040 and 1060, gold coins were minted in Nishapur in his name, many of which refer to him as "al-Sultan al-Muazzam."

Some of the titles and epithets used for Tughril in documents and coins include: al-Amir al-Jalil, Rukn al-Dawla wa’l-Din, Yamin Amir al-Mu’minin, Malik al-Islam wa’l-Muslimin, Burhan Amir al-Mu’minin, Shahanshah, Malik al-Mashriq wa’l-Maghrib, Ghiyath al-Muslimin, Mugheeth ‘Ibad Allah. Tughril’s official motto (tawqi) was "I‘timadi ‘ala Allah" (My trust is in God).

== Religious policy ==
Tughril is noted to have adhered to the Sunni sect, particularly affiliating with the Hanafi school, which stemmed from the early religious inclinations of the Seljuks, including Seljuk himself. When analyzing Tughril's actions during the caliphate period, he was portrayed as a figure who rescued the caliphate during the crisis caused by Arslan al-Basasiri and helped re-establish the Abbasid caliph as the spiritual leader of the Muslim ummah. He is reported to have been active in the religious domain; for instance, he personally initiated the construction of a large mosque in the city of Rayy for the Hanafi population. According to a narration transmitted by Muhammad ibn Ali al-Rawandi, Imam Abu Hanifa, after praying for divine support if his school was just, heard a voice at the Kaaba declaring:

You are just, and your banner shall be raised high, your creed shall be strengthened; so long as the sword remains in the hands of the Turks who follow the Hanafi school.

Al-Rawandi interpreted the influence of the Hanafi school as having grown with the support of the Turks, who, through their military prowess, triumphed over Arabs, Iranians and Byzantines. He also noted that the Seljuk sultans trained so many scholars who followed Abu Hanifa that affection for these scholars became ingrained in the hearts of both the old and young. Consequently, it can be said that the Seljuk rulers following Tughril also leaned toward the Hanafi school and made significant efforts in this direction. Tughril’s vizier, Amid al-Mulk Kunduri, is known to have been a strict adherent of the Hanafi school; under his orders, curses were pronounced from pulpits in Khurasan against Shi‘ites and Rafidis (pejorative term for Shi‘ites). In 1053, through the efforts of Amid al-Mulk Kunduri and Abu Ali Hasan Sandali, a Hanafi preacher in Nishapur, Tughril issued a declaration against the Ash‘arites. This led to a confrontation with those who followed the Shafi‘i school and held Ash‘ari theological views. Tughril ordered that Shi‘ites, people of innovation (ahl al-bid‘a), and Ash‘arites be cursed from pulpits and that religious activities by Shafi‘i-Ash‘ari scholars be prohibited. Under the influence of this policy, Abu al-Hasan al-Ash‘ari and his followers were denounced as heretics.

In this context, the letter of Abu al-Qasim al-Qushayri addressed to Tughril and scholars of Islamic cities, which defended Ash‘ari theology, proved ineffective. Tughril, together with Amid al-Mulk, took stricter measures and issued an edict ordering the exile of prominent Shafi‘i figures in Nishapur who had voiced opposition. As a result of these events, those affiliated with the Hanafi school came to the center of state attention. A Sultan’s Madrasa was founded in Nishapur for them, public religious rituals in congregational mosques were performed in accordance with Hanafi jurisprudence, and Hanafi judges were appointed to legal positions throughout Seljuk territories. After Tughril entered Baghdad, Hanafi representatives were received with great honor, and under the order of Amid al-Mulk, the Hanafi scholar Abu Abdullah Damghani was appointed qadi al-qudat (chief judge) in place of a Shafi‘i jurist. However, this process was suspended for thirty years after Tughril’s death in 1063.

Ibn al-Jawzi in al-Muntazam fi Tarikh al-Muluk wa al-Umam and Ibn Hajar al-‘Asqalani in Lisan al-Mizan narrate that after Tughril entered Baghdad in 1055, the Sunni population there burned the books of Shaykh al-Tusi several times. Sunni crowds organized attacks against Shi‘ites and Shi‘ite scholars, raided Shaykh al-Tusi’s library and set his books ablaze, forcing him into hiding. Eventually, under the oversight of Amid al-Mulk, his house was also burned down. Shaykh al-Tusi then migrated to Najaf, where he founded the Najaf religious seminary.

== Numismatics ==
The coins minted by the Great Seljuks were made of gold, silver, and bronze. Particularly, the gold coins from this period are distinguished by their high precision and refinement in production, as well as by their high purity. Additionally, most of the currency used during the Great Seljuk era was minted in gold. In some cases, silver coins were issued in a form resembling gold coins; although the material was silver, the edge of the coin featured the inscription “darb haza al-dinar…” (“this coin is a dinar…”), indicating it was a gold coin, while the word “dirham” (silver coin) was omitted.

Seljuk coins were similar in form and inscription to those circulated during other dynasties. The titles of rulers—such as al-Sultan al-‘Adil, al-Sultan al-A‘zam, al-Sultan al-Mu‘azzam, Malik al-Muluk, Shahanshah, Abu’l-Muzaffar, and others—were inscribed on the coins. The Seljuks operated a limited and centralized minting system. Mints were active in cities such as Ray, Ahvaz, Fasa, Samiram, Wasit, Saveh, Hamadan, Shiraz, Basra, and others. The most active mint of this period was located in Nishapur, followed by Isfahan.

== Architectural activities ==
The early period of Seljuk rule—i.e., the era of the Great Seljuks—witnessed significant construction and urban development activities. These endeavors are observed to have begun with the Seljuks’ initial conquests in Iran. However, due to the scarcity of written sources from the period and the lack of detailed discussion of such issues in available sources, the construction efforts during the early years of Seljuk rule have remained largely unnoticed by historians. This is mainly because the period was dominated by political and military events, drawing historians’ attention to those matters. Furthermore, inter-dynastic rivalries of the time contributed to the lack of information in this area.

Nonetheless, a careful examination of available sources reveals evidence of some construction activities during the early Seljuk period. For instance, at the beginning of Nasir Khusraw’s travelogue, a school is mentioned to have been constructed in the city of Nishapur. After conquering the Tabarak fortress, Tughril ordered its reconstruction and commissioned the building of elegant structures there. Moreover, he built a palace in the village of Tajrish, where he eventually died. After conquering Iraq, he commissioned the construction of a city on the banks of the Tigris River, including a congregational mosque within it. There are also reports of his construction activities in Wasit. Similarly, sources mention building projects in Ray, including schools, mosques, and other public buildings. The Hanafi mosque in Ray is known as “Tughril’s Friday Mosque,” and it is noted to have been built by him. Additionally, there is information about Tughril’s mausoleum, with some sources stating that Tughril ibn Arslan was also buried there.

Archaeological research has also identified several monuments from this period. These include the "Chehel Dokhtaran" Mausoleum in Damghan, the inscription and minaret of the Damghan Friday Mosque, and one of the Kharaqan tombs built between 1050-1060. Another source notes that after Tughril’s attack on Isfahan, he undertook reconstruction efforts in the devastated city that caught the attention of Nasir Khusraw. Khusraw wrote that Tughril’s name was inscribed on the gate of Khan Lanjan, a city seven farsakhs from Isfahan, and that people had returned to settle there. Summarizing all this information, it can be concluded that the early Seljuk period was significant not only in political and military terms but also in construction and development. However, the events and disasters of the time destroyed many of these buildings. Therefore, a comprehensive assessment of construction activities from this era necessitates a careful examination of historical sources.

=== Tughril Tower ===
After achieving a series of significant successes and attaining an exceptional position with the support of Amid al-Mulk and the title “al-Sultan al-Mu‘azzam” (“The Glorious Sultan”), Tughril, contrary to nomadic traditions, came to require a grand mausoleum befitting a king. To this end, a mausoleum known as the Tughril Tower was built for him in the city of Ray, which served as his capital.

Seljuk architecture exhibits various forms and styles, and the Tughril Tower was constructed in the form of a tower-mausoleum decorated with vertical projections, a characteristic of one of these styles. These projections cover both the interior and exterior surfaces of the tower. The Tughril Tower is regarded as one of the finest examples of Seljuk architecture. Its exterior is designed as a 24-pointed star, with the body consisting of convex, triangular-shaped projections. The structure stands approximately 21 meters high with a diameter of 16 meters. Its interior is circular in layout, and the cylindrical body is covered with brickwork.

== Legacy ==
Sultan Tughril was undoubtedly a military genius. Though his military campaigns inflicted serious damage on the productive forces of many conquered states, they paved the way for the establishment of the first powerful medieval empire of the Turks that linked "the East and the West". The formation of a vast empire objectively led to important changes in socio-economic, political and cultural life. The role of the landowning aristocracy markedly increased. Gradually, a new apparatus of state administration and an imperial system of civil and military administration took shape. Before the advent of the Seljuks, Iran was divided between several warring local powers, such as the Buyids, Kakuyids and Ghaznavids. As a result, it suffered from continuous war and destruction. However, under Tughril peace and prosperity were brought to the country and to Mesopotamia, a transition that was further reinforced due to the Seljuks' assimilation to Iranian-Muslim culture.

Tughril's conquests had an impact on the lives of not only the people of annexed states, but also the nomads themselves, who participated in the establishment of the new state. Noticeable changes in the life of the Oguz-Turkmen tribes occurred as they settled in Khorasan, Iran, Iraq, Syria, Transcaucasia and Asia Minor. The transition of compact groups of nomads to a semi-settled and sedentary life and agriculture took place. The old tribal ties broke up; feudal relations received a new incentive for further development, although remnants of archaic institutions remained for a long time. The Seljuk nobility began to gradually merge with the feudal aristocracy of the conquered lands.

=== Demographic transformations ===
The Seljuk entry into Iran marked the beginning of large-scale Turkic migrations into the Iranian plateau, Azerbaijan, and Anatolia, thereby altering the ethnic composition of these regions. As a result, the number of Turkic inhabitants increased significantly. Furthermore, the balance between sedentary and nomadic populations in the eastern parts of the Islamic world shifted, with nomads beginning to play more active roles in cultural and political spheres. This influence persisted well into the nineteenth century.

=== Model of governance ===
Upon seizing power, the Seljuks came to understand that the caliphate was a vital source of authority and legitimacy. They sought to exploit this resource to the fullest extent. A ruler such as Tughril made considerable efforts to uphold the caliphate in order to safeguard his political interests, securing his legitimacy by rescuing the caliph from threats posed by the Fatimids and Buyids. However, while the caliphate served as a source of legitimacy, it was also perceived as an obstacle to centralization and control over religious matters. For this reason, the Seljuks allowed the caliphate to persist in a formal capacity while rejecting its temporal and material authority. They expanded their control and influence over the caliph by appointing viziers and forging marital ties with the caliphal family.

=== Establishment of control apparatus ===
The Seljuk era, especially under Tughril’s rule, witnessed the institutionalization of certain offices used to exert control and pressure on the caliph. Among these were the shihna, military and administrative officials appointed by the sultan. They monitored the activities of the caliph and his entourage while also ensuring security and order in Baghdad and Iraq. Thus, the office of shihna carried out both executive and military functions, limiting the caliph’s autonomy, applying pressure, and serving as a control mechanism to preempt potential rebellions against the sultan.

=== Emergence of sectarian conflict ===
Prior to the Seljuks, the central regions of the Islamic world—Iran, Iraq, and Egypt—had largely been under the rule of Shi‘ite emirates. As of 390 AH (1000 CE), the Ghaznavids were the only major Sunni political power. The Sunni Seljuks, however, consolidated Sunni dominance in the territories they conquered.

Upon entering Iran and becoming familiar with the existing institutions of power, the Seljuks sought to gain the support of both the Abbasid caliphate and the people to legitimize and consolidate their rule. To secure the approval of the Sunni majority and the caliphal institution at its head, they initiated a rigorous and sustained campaign against the Shi‘a. Believing that reasserting the caliphate's spiritual authority was only possible through such measures, they adopted a harsh and aggressive stance toward Shi‘ism. The Sunni community, which had long been divided by internal strife, reorganized during this period and mobilized against the Shiites, encouraged by Seljuk state support. By this time, the Shiites had developed a solid political and institutional presence, largely due to the open support of the Buyids, who had ruled parts of Iran and Iraq for a long time. As a result, Shiites became a formidable rival to the Abbasid caliphate and the broader Sunni community, both in demographic and political terms. In particular, the military and political activities of the Isma‘ili Shiites further intensified the conflict, leading to direct confrontations between the Sunni government and Shi‘ite groups. The Seljuk Turks exploited this volatile religious climate to eliminate political rivals and opposition groups. These sectarian conflicts led to widespread slander, accusations, and conspiracies, with each faction wielding this "sharp sword" against the other—plunging the Islamic world into deep and violent divisions.

Tughril’s rise to power and his victories over the Buyids and Fatimids, combined with his support for the Sunni caliphate, resulted in increased repression of the Shi‘a and restrictions on the dissemination of their doctrines and beliefs. After converting to Islam, the Seljuks had adopted the Hanafi school. Tughril’s vizier, Amid al-Mulk Kunduri, a zealous Hanafi, capitalized on the prevailing situation by launching a campaign—first against the Shi‘a, and then against their theological rivals, the Shafi‘is.

With Tughril’s approval, he ordered curses against the Shiites and Ash‘arites to be pronounced from pulpits, used religious and military pretexts to suppress opposition, and incited Hanafi scholars against the Shafi‘is. As a result of this religious persecution, notable Shafi‘i scholars such as Abu al-Qasim al-Qushayri and Imam Abu al-Ma‘ali al-Juwayni were forced to emigrate due to the sectarian atmosphere. Although the balance of power between rival sects shifted over time—most notably when the Shafi‘i-aligned Nizam al-Mulk rose to prominence—the religious conflicts remained a persistent and influential feature of the Seljuk period.

== Tughril’s death and the consequences of his succession decision ==
Before his death, Tughril designated Suleiman, the younger son of Chaghri Beg, as his heir. By doing so, he nominated someone for the throne who was rarely mentioned in historical sources and lacked significant political importance. However, maintaining the unity between the eastern and western parts of the Seljuk Empire required a powerful ruler capable of governing such a vast territory. Furthermore, attempts to centralize authority had previously proven unsuccessful. This was due in part to the presence of influential forces within Seljuk territories that resisted the strengthening of central rule. These forces primarily consisted of members of the Seljuk dynasty itself and independent-minded Turkic groups who did not conform to hierarchical structures. Their unruly behavior often led to instability. In addition, the submission of certain Seljuk military commanders could only be achieved through the presence of a strong and permanent central government with a capable army. Among such figures were Yağıbasan and Ardam, who declared Alp Arslan's ascension to power by having his name recited in the Friday sermon (khutbah) in Qazvin.

On the other side, the appointed heir Suleiman enjoyed the support of Tughril's vizier, Amid al-Mulk Kunduri. The vizier saw the accession of Suleiman as essential for maintaining his own political position and influence. However, Alp Arslan had around him a powerful figure in the form of Nizam al-Mulk. The presence of Nizam al-Mulk threatened Kunduri’s future. In this context, the farsighted Nizam al-Mulk threw his full support behind Alp Arslan and entered the political struggle with determination.

Ultimately, Alp Arslan, with his administrative experience in the province of Khurasan and his clearly superior military capabilities compared to Suleiman, defeated the rival faction of Suleiman and Amid al-Mulk, compelling them to recognize his rule. Nevertheless, Alp Arslan still faced serious threats that could hinder the rapid consolidation of his authority across the Seljuk realm. Opportunists such as Qilij Arslan, for instance, took up positions south of the Caspian Sea in the Alborz Mountains with the aim of seizing strategically important cities like Ray and Qazvin. Eventually, Alp Arslan achieved a complete victory. As a result of this triumph, Kunduri’s political influence collapsed—he was arrested and, following Nizam al-Mulk’s plans, executed.

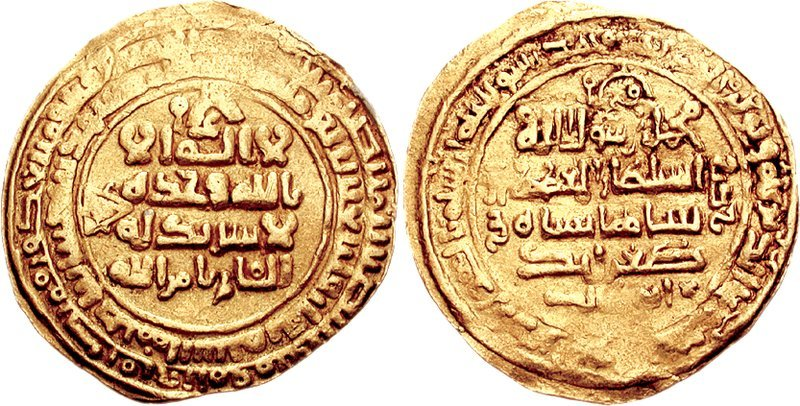
Coin of Tughril

== Historical sources ==
In order to conduct a thorough study and research on the Seljuk state and its sultans, it is necessary to utilize a wide range of sources. These sources can be classified as follows:

=== Primary sources ===
Primary sources are particularly valuable for researchers due to their proximity in time to the events they describe. These can be grouped into several subcategories:

Arabic sources

Arabic-language sources were either written during the Seljuk period or shortly thereafter. Their authors often lived in regions under the Abbasid Caliphate or elsewhere in the Islamic world and had the opportunity to observe Seljuk governance firsthand. These works are rich in both political and administrative insights.

Tārīkh-i Yamīnī: Composed in the 5th century AH by Abū Naṣr Muḥammad ibn ʿAbd al-Jabbār ʿUṯbī, this work is considered a reliable source, particularly regarding early Turkic history. It also includes accounts of the early Seljuks and their interactions with the Ghaznavids. Later translated and expanded by Nāṣih Jurfādaqān, the translation includes additional information about the decline of Seljuk rule in Iraq and their conflicts with the Khwarazmshahs.

Risāla fī Tafḍīl al-Atrāk ʿalā Sāʾir al-Ajnād wa Manāqib al-Ḥaḍrah al-ʿAliyya al-Sulṭāniyya: Written in the 5th century AH by Ibn Ḥassūl Abū’l-Aʿlā, a servant of Ṭughril, this work provides insights into the early period of the Seljuks and contains reflections and opinions about the Turks in general.

Persian sources

Zayn al-Akhbār: Composed in the 5th century AH by Gardīzī, this work covers ancient Iranian history, the life of the Prophet, and events up to 423 AH/1032 CE. Of particular interest is the section on Khurasan’s history up to 432 AH/1041 CE, which includes valuable material on the early Seljuk period.

Tārīkh-i Bayhaqī: Written by Abū’l-Faẓl Muḥammad ibn al-Ḥasan Bayhaqī in the 5th century AH, this 30-volume chronicle covers events up to 451 AH/1059 CE. It primarily discusses the Ghaznavid sultans and includes numerous official documents. The Seljuks are also discussed, especially in the context of their relations with the Ghaznavids and their administrators.

=== Secondary sources ===
Though composed long after the Seljuk era, these sources still offer useful information for historical research.

Turkic sources

Selçuknāme: Written by ʿAlī Yazıcıoğlu in the 9th century AH, this work is a translation and abridgment of Ibn Bībī’s al-Awāmir al-ʿAlāʾiyya. The author added chapters on the ethnogenesis of the Oghuz and Great Seljuks and incorporated the Oghuznāmeh section from Rashīd al-Dīn’s Jāmiʿ al-Tawārīkh, providing extensive information on the Oghuz people.

Destūrnāme: Composed in the 9th century AH by Anwārī, this narrative poem devotes much space to the Aydınid dynasty, especially Qāḍī Ughur Bey’s campaigns. It also includes valuable details on the Iranian Seljuks, Salghurids, Ghaznavids, Khwarazmshahs, and Mongols, drawing on sources such as Qāḍī Bayzāwī’s Niẓām al-Tawārīkh and Ibn Hilāl al-Ṣābī’s Gharas al-Niʿma and ʿUyūn al-Tawārīkh. Some information from Byzantine sources found here is not mentioned elsewhere.

Selçuknāme (by Aḥmad ibn Maḥmūd Imāmzāde): Written in the 10th century AH, this poetic and literary chronicle relies on earlier sources for information about the Great Seljuks. While coverage of the Great Seljuks is comprehensive, the section on the Anatolian Seljuks is brief and lacks detail.

Arabic sources

al-Anbāʾ fī Tārīkh al-Khulafāʾ: A chronicle written by Muḥammad ibn al-ʿUmrānī in the 6th century AH, it begins with the life of the Prophet Muḥammad and ends with the Abbasid Caliphate. It is a valuable source for understanding the relationship between the Seljuks and the Abbasid caliphs, especially al-Qāʾim bi-Amrillāh.

Tārīkh-i ʿAẓīmī: Written by ʿAlī al-Tanūkhī al-ʿAẓīmī in the 6th century AH, this work presents a concise Islamic history from Adam to Caliph al-Muktafī. It provides significant primary material on the Seljuks, including the conquest of Syria and Anatolia and conflicts with the Crusaders, Zengids, and other Atabegs.

al-Muntaẓam wa Multaqāʾāt al-Multazam fī Akhbār al-Mulūk wa al-Umam: Composed by Ibn al-Jawzī in the 6th century AH, this work extends to 572 AH and emphasizes the religious scholars and events of the time. It provides detailed insights into Seljuk-Abbasid relations, especially in Baghdad, where the author himself resided.

Akhbār al-Dawlah al-Saljūqiyyah: Attributed to Ṣadr al-Dīn Abū’l-Ḥasan ʿAlī ibn Nāṣir al-Ḥusaynī (7th century AH), this major Seljuk chronicle is based on three earlier sources: Zubdat al-Tawārīkh, Nuṣrat al-Fatrah, and an earlier version of Akhbār al-Dawlah. It covers from the origins of the Seljuks to the death of Ṭughril III in 1194.

al-Kāmil fī al-Tārīkh: Authored by Ibn al-Athir in the 7th century AH, this 12-volume universal chronicle covers events up to 628 AH/1231 CE. It is regarded as highly reliable, especially for the history of the Turks, the rise of the Seljuks, and their rule in Iran, Iraq, and Syria. The author’s contemporaneity with the Atabegs of Mosul enhances its value.

Mirʾāt al-Zamān fī Tārīkh al-Aʿyān: Written in the 7th century AH by Abū’l-Muẓaffar Yūsuf ibn Qizāwghlī, this universal chronicle begins with Adam and continues to the author’s lifetime. Particularly valuable are the details from the second half of the 5th century AH, including rare insights on Ṭughril Beg, Alp Arslan, and Malikshāh, as well as Seljuk activities in Anatolia, Syria, and Palestine.

Zubdat al-Fikrah fī Tārīkh al-Hijrah (a.k.a. Tārīkh-i Baybars): Written in the 7th or 8th century AH by Baybars Manṣūrī, this 10-volume history reaches up to 723 AH/1323 CE. It provides detailed and valuable information about Anatolia’s political and geographical landscape, as well as the relationships among Seljuks, Mongols, and Mamluks.

Kanz al-Durar wa Jāmiʿ al-Ghurar: A 9-volume historical chronicle by Ibn Aybak al-Dawādārī, composed in the 7th or 8th century AH. It includes extensive and original information on Seljuk, Mongol, and Mamluk relations. Although similar to Sīrat Malik Manṣūr, it offers distinct material of great significance.

al-Sulūk fī Maʿrifat Duwal al-Mulūk: Written in the 9th century AH by al-Maqrīzī, this history spans events from 567 AH/1171 CE to 844 AH/1441 CE. While primarily focused on Egypt and the Mamluks, it contains useful brief information on Seljuk rule.

Tārīkh al-Khulafāʾ: Authored by Jalāl al-Dīn al-Suyūṭī in the 9th century AH, this work serves as an essential source for studying the relationship between the Seljuks and the caliphate.

Nuṣrat al-Fatrah wa ʿAṣrat al-Fiṭrah: Composed in the 6th century AH by ʿAmād al-Dīn al-Kātib al-Iṣfahānī. He translated his own Persian work Futūr Zamān al-Ṣudūr into Arabic and added new material concerning the Seljuk period, especially up to the death of Alp Arslan and subsequent events in Iraq and Iran. It is regarded as a critical source for Seljuk history.

Tārīkh Marw wa Dhayl Baghdād: This monumental 20-volume history of Marw was compiled by Abū Saʿīd ʿAbd al-Karīm ibn Muḥammad al-Samʿānī in the 6th century AH. It includes significant content on Khurasan and Turkestan. The work is vital for studying the rise and cultural development of the Seljuks. The author also wrote a 15-volume supplement to Khaṭīb al-Baghdādī’s Tārīkh Baghdād, which originally consisted of 40 volumes.

Persian sources

Majmaʿ al-Tavārīkh and Qisas: This work, authored in the early 6th century AH (12th century CE), is anonymous. Compiled as a general history organized by dynasties, it covers events from the creation of the world up to the year 520 AH / 1126 CE. The book provides information about the Seljuks and other Turkic dynasties, and some content is derived from now-lost works by Hilāl al-Ṣābī. This text offers valuable insights into Iran’s ancient history, particularly concerning Turkic tribes. It differs from the narratives of Gardīzī and includes many legendary elements.

Aghrāz al-Siyāsa fī Aʿrāz al-Riyāsa: Written in the 6th century AH by Muhammad ibn ʿAlī Kātip Samarqandī, this text presents the biographies of various rulers, including Sultan Sanjar. Composed primarily in a narrative style, it holds significance especially for events during the reign of Qilij Tamghach Khan.

Mashārib al-Tajārib wa Ghawārib al-Gharāib: This work was written in the 6th century AH by Ibn Funduq Bayhaqī. According to historians such as Ibn al-Athīr, Juvaynī, and Hamdallah Mustawfī, this source is especially important for understanding the period of early Seljuk rule and the era contemporary to the author.

Ṭabaqāt-i Nāṣirī: Authored by Jūzjānī in the 7th century AH, this work was intended to supplement a historical text covering the lives of prophets, Umayyads, Abbasids, Iranian rulers, and the Ghaznavids. It also includes the history from the Buyids to the Khwarazmshahs, as well as the Ayyubids and rulers in Delhi. Although written in India in the early 13th century CE, it provides valuable information about Turkic peoples and their history.

Niẓām al-Tavārīkh: This general history was compiled by Qāḍī Bayḍāwī in the 7th century AH. It discusses the prophets, caliphs, and dynasties such as the Umayyads, Abbasids, Saffarids, Samanids, Ghaznavids, Daylamites, Seljuks, Salghurids, and Khwarazmshahs. The text also contains extensive details about the Mongols and is especially significant for the history of the Seljuks in Fars and the Atabeg dynasties.[187]

Ādāb al-Ḥarb: Written by Fakhr al-Dīn Mubārakshāh in the 7th century AH, this treatise discusses events from the reigns of Tughril, Malikshāh, and Sultan Sanjar. It also includes information about the Ghaznavids and Qarakhanids, and elaborates on medieval warfare and military principles.

Al-Aʿrāḍ fī’l-Ḥikāyat al-Saljūqiyya: Composed in the 8th century AH by Muhammad ibn ʿAbdullāh ibn Niẓām al-Ḥusaynī al-Yazdī, this work is an abridgment of Rahat al-Ṣudūr. It provides detailed information on the Great Seljuks and is particularly notable for including a six-article legal code attributed to Malikshāh.

Zubdat al-Tavārīkh: Written by Muhammad Kāshānī in the 8th century AH, this text discusses the history of Islamic dynasties. In addition to its valuable coverage of the Great Seljuks, it provides information on the Kerman Seljuks and Qarakhanids.

Zafarnāma: Authored by Hamdallah Mustawfi in the 8th century AH, this epic consists of approximately 75,000 couplets. It is divided into three parts: history from the prophets and caliphs to the conquest of Baghdad; the post-Islamic history of Iranian dynasties; and Qism al-Sulṭānī, which covers the Turks, Mongols, Oghuz Khan, the lineage of Chinggis Khan, and the Ilkhanids. It is one of the most significant sources on Turkic history.

Shāhnāma-yi Saljūqī: Written in the 8th century AH by Aḥmad ibn Muhammad al-Ṭūsī (Qanāʾī), this work covers ancient Iranian history, the era of the prophets, and the Islamic period. It contains extensive material on the Ghaznavids, Great Seljuks, and especially the Seljuks of Anatolia.

Saljūqnāma: Composed in the 8th century AH by Aḥmad Niyāghdāʾī, this text is an abridgment of his own earlier work, al-Walad al-Shafiq. It contains important information on both the Great Seljuks and the Seljuks of Anatolia.

Majmaʿ al-Tavārīkh (by Ḥāfiẓ Abru): Written by Hafiz-i Abru in the 9th century AH at the request of Shahrukh, the son of Timur. The author compiled the work using various sources and included contemporary events. The text is divided into four parts and is particularly important for incorporating material from now-lost sources.

Rawḍat al-Ṣafā fī Sīrat al-Anbiyāʾ wa’l-Mulūk wa’l-Khulafāʾ: This general history in seven volumes was composed in the 9th century AH by Mirkhvand. Although it contains limited material on the Seljuks, its use of now-lost sources such as Maliknāma lends it special significance.

Ḥabīb al-Siyar fī Akhbār Afrād al-Bashar: Written by Khvandamir between the 9th and 10th centuries AH, this three-volume general history covers Islamic history in the first two volumes, and in the third, the history of the Turks and Mongols, particularly up to the death of Chinggis Khan.

Tuhfat al-Mulūk: The author and date of composition are unknown. The work consists of various historical anecdotes, including stories about Tughril, Sanjar, and Malikshāh. It is believed to have been written in the Anatolian region.

Tārīkh-i Bayhaq: Authored in the 6th century AH by Ibn Funduq Bayhaqī, this work is based on the earlier Tārīkh-i Nīshābūr by Nishāpūrī and covers events up to 563 AH / 1168 CE. In the introduction, the author discusses the value of historical writing, followed by a detailed account of the Bayhaq region, its conquest by Muslims, and the geography of the area. It offers thorough descriptions of the Tahirids, Saffarids, Samanids, Ghaznavids, and Seljuks. The text also provides biographical information on notable scholars, families, and poets, and includes details on the Seljuk campaigns in Anatolia and political developments in Khurasan. It stands out for its rare information on the family of Niẓām al-Mulk. Bayhaqī relied on ancient sources, archival documents, and personal observation.

Shirāznāma: Composed in the 8th century AH by Abū’l-ʿAbbās Aḥmad ibn Abū’l-Khayr Zarkūb Shīrāzī, this book focuses particularly on the Fars region, detailing the history of the states that ruled there from the Buyids to the author’s time. It also includes the biographies of prominent individuals buried in Shiraz. The work provides primary and original insights into the political, economic, and social affairs of the Great Seljuks and other powers that ruled in this region.

== Sources ==
- al-Athīr (2006), The Chronicle of Ibn Al-Athīr for the Crusading Period from Al-Kāmil Fīʼl-taʼrīkh. Crusade texts in translation (by Richards, D.S.), Ashgate, ISBN 978-0-7546-4077-6
- Bāstānī Rād, Hasan (1390), Nezām-i Pāytakhti-ye Irān dar ʿAsr-i Saljuqiyān: Bā Taʾkīd bar Dār al-Mulk-hā-ye Kermān, Tehran: Motāleʿāt-i Tārikh-i Farhangi (Studies in Cultural History), no. 10
- Bosworth, C. E. (1975a). "The early Ghaznavids". In Frye, R. N. (ed.). The Cambridge History of Iran, Volume 4: From the Arab Invasion to the Saljuqs. Cambridge: Cambridge University Press. pp. 162–198. ISBN 0-521-20093-8.
- Bosworth, C. E. (1975b). "Iran under the Buyids". In Frye, R. N. (ed.). The Cambridge History of Iran, Volume 4: From the Arab Invasion to the Saljuqs. Cambridge: Cambridge University Press. pp. 250–305. ISBN 0-521-20093-8.
- Bosworth, C. E. (1968). "The Political and Dynastic History of the Iranian World (A.D. 1000–1217)". In Frye, R. N. (ed.). The Cambridge History of Iran, Volume 5: The Saljuq and Mongol periods. Cambridge: Cambridge University Press. pp. 1–202. ISBN 0-521-06936-X.
- Bosworth, C.E. (2000a). "Ṭog̲h̲ri̊l (I) Beg". The Encyclopaedia of Islam, New Edition (12 vols.). Leiden: E. J. Brill.
- Bosworth, C.E. (2000b). "Ṭog̲h̲ri̊l". The Encyclopaedia of Islam, New Edition (12 vols.). Leiden: E. J. Brill.
- Bosworth, C. E.; Doran; de Blois; Rogers; Cahen; Lambton; Hillenbrand (2001), Saljūqiyān. Translated by Yaʿqūb Āzhand, Tehran: Intishārāt-i Mowlā, ISBN 978-964-5996-48-0
- Bosworth, Clifford Edmund (1380), Saljūqiyān. Tarjumah-yi Yaʿqūb Āzhand., Tihrān: Intishārāt-i Mūlī
- Bosworth, Clifford Edmund (1381), Tārīkh-i Īrān-i Kambrīj. Jild-i 5. Tarjumah-yi Ḥasan Anūshah, Tihrān: Intishārāt-i Amīr Kabīr
- Bosworth, Clifford Edmund (2000), Ṭoghri̊l (I) Beg, Encyclopaedia of Islam
- Bosworth, Clifford Edmund (1395), Tārīkh-i Īrān-i Cambridge, vol. 5. Translated by Ḥasan Anūsheh, Tehran: Intishārāt-e Amīrkabīr
- Ermaki, Ermaki, Azad and Kamali, Maryam (2012), "Mashru'iyyat-i Siyasi va Sākhtār-i Qudrat dar Hukūmat-i Saljuqiyan", جامعه‌شناسی تاریخی, vol. 4, no. 2, Jāmiʿaʿ-shināsi-ye Tārikhi (Historical Sociology), Tehran, no. 2., pp. 117–143
- Forūzānī, Abū al-Qāsim (1394), Saljūqiyān az Āghāz tā Farjām, Tihrān: Sāzmān-i Muṭāliʿah wa Tadwīn-i Kutub-i ʿUlūm-i Insānī
- Ḥilmi, Aḥmad Kamāl al-Dīn (1390), Dawlat-i Saljūqiyān. Tarjumah-yi ʿAbdullāh Nāṣirī Ṭāhirī, Tihrān: Pazhūhishgāh-i Ḥawzah wa Dānishgāh
- Iqbāl, ʿAbbās (1392), Tārīkh-i Īrān az Inqiżā-yi Sāsānīyān tā Inqiżā-yi Qājārīyah, Tihrān: Intishārāt-i Dabīr
- İstek, Gülşen (2020), Büyük Selçuklu Devleti ile Abbasi Hilafeti Arasında Gerçekleşen Siyasi Evlilikler, Social Mentality and Researcher Thinkers Journal. 6 (32). ASOS Yayinevi
- Kanvash, Fazlī (1395), Marjaʿ-shenāsī-ye Tārīkh-i Saljūqiyān. Translated by Ḥasan Ḥaẓratī and Āsīyeh Raḥmānī-Nezhād, Tehran: Pizhūhishkadeh-ye Tārīkh-i Islām
- Lambton, A.K.S. (1988). Continuity and Change in Medieval Persia. Bibliotheca Persica. Bibliotheca Persica. ISBN 978-0-88706-133-2.
- Madelung, W. (1975). "The Minor Dynasties of Northern Iran". In Frye, R. N. (ed.). The Cambridge History of Iran, Volume 4: From the Arab Invasion to the Saljuqs. Cambridge: Cambridge University Press. pp. 198–249. ISBN 978-0-521-20093-6.
- Makdisi, G. (1986). "al-Kundurī". In Bosworth, C. E.; van Donzel, E.; Lewis, B. & Pellat, Ch. (eds.). The Encyclopaedia of Islam, Second Edition. Volume V: Khe–Mahi. Leiden: E. J. Brill. pp. 387–388. ISBN 978-90-04-07819-2.
- Minorsky, V. (2000). "Tabriz". The Encyclopaedia of Islam. Brill.
- Mūsavīyān, Seyyed-Moḥammad-Reżā (1383), Andīsheh-ye Siyasi-ye Shaykh Ṭūsī, Qom: Būstān-e Ketāb
- Moʿallemī, Moṣṭafā (1389), Rawābeṭ-e Khāndān-e Bāv bā Salājegheh va Qodrat-e Siyasi-ye Tashayyoʿ-e Emāmī dar Sadehhā-ye Panjom va Sheshom-e Hejri. Tabarestān-Nāmeh., Māzandarān: Enteshārāt-e Rasānash
- Moʿazzī and Shaʿbān, Moʿazzī, Maryam and Shaʿbān, Somayyeh (1389), Mabānī-ye Mashrūʿiyyat-e Ḥokūmatī-ye Ṭughril-e Saljūqī, Sīstān: Pazhūheshhā-ye Tārīkhī-ye Dāneshgāh-e Sīstān va Balūchestān, no. 7
- Morgan, David O.; Reid, Anthony (2011), The New Cambridge History of Islam Vol 3., Cambridge University Press
- Peacock, A. C. S. (2015). The Great Seljuk Empire. Edinburgh University Press. pp. 1–378. ISBN 978-0-7486-3826-0.
- Peacock, Andrew (2017). "Rawwadids". Encyclopædia Iranica, online edition. New York.
- Rezaiyan, Ali (1391), Barrasi va moghayese-ye ravand-e mashruiyat-yabi-ye siyasi-ye salatin
- Safi, Omid (2006). The Politics of Knowledge in Premodern Islam: Negotiating Ideology and Religious Inquiry. University of North Carolina Press. ISBN 9780807856574.
- Sajādī, Ṣādeq (1383), "Basāsīrī." In Seyyed Moḥammad-Kāẓem Mūsavī Bojnūrdī (ed.), Dāʾerat al-Maʿārif-e Bozorg-e Eslāmī, vol. 12., Markaz-e Dāʾerat al-Maʿārif-e Bozorg-e Eslāmī: Tehran
- Sarfaraz and Avorzamani, Sarfaraz, Ali-Akbar; Avorzamani, Fereydoun (1389), Sekkeh-haye Iran az Aghaz ta Doran-e Zandiyeh, Tehran: Sazman-e Motale'e va Tadvin-e Kotob-e Olum-e Ensani
- Sattārzādah, Malīḥah (1386), Saljūqiyān, Tihrān: Sāzmān-i Muṭāliʿah wa Tadwīn-i Kutub-i ʿUlūm-i Insānī
- Spuler, Bosworth, Clifford Edmund, Faruk Sumer, Vladimir Minorsky, Bertold Spuler (1385), Turkān dar Īrān. Tarjumah-yi Yaʿqūb Āzhand, Tehran: Intishārāt-i Mūlī
- Spuler, Bertold (2014). Iran in the Early Islamic Period: Politics, Culture, Administration and Public Life between the Arab and the Seljuk Conquests, 633-1055. Brill. ISBN 978-90-04-28209-4.
- Spuler, Bertold (1368), Tārikh-i Irān dar Qurun-i Nakhost-i Islami. Translated by Maryam Mir-Ahmadi, Tehran: ʿElmi va Farhangi Publications
- Sümer, Faruk (2012), TUĞRUL BEY, İslam Ansiklopedisi
- Torkamānī Āzar, Parvīn (2006), Saljuqiyān: Ekhtelāfāt-i Mazhabī va Payāmadhā-ye Ān, Tehran: Pazhūheshnāma-ye ʿUlūm-i Ensānī (Journal of Humanities), no. 51
- Van Donzel, E. J., ed. (1994). Islamic Desk Reference. E.J. Brill. ISBN 9789004097384.
- Yūsef-Zamānī, Yūsef-Zamānī, Mehrdād; Neʿmatī Ābkenārī, ʿAlī; Khāledīān, Sattār (1396), "Vākāvī-ye Āthār-e Meʿmārī va Eqdāmāt-e ʿOmrānī-ye Nakhustin Ḥokmrānān-e Saljūqī bar Asās-e Manābeʿ-e Maktūb az Sāl 429 tā 465 Hejri Qamarī", پژوهش های باستان شناسی ایران, 7 (12), Tehran: Pazhūheshhā-ye Bāstānshenāsī-ye Irān, no. 12., doi:10.22084/nbsh.2017.7200.1307
- The Editors of Encyclopedia Britannica (1998), Toghrïl Beg, Encyclopedia Britannica

Tughril I House of Seljuk Born: 990 Died: 4 October 1063
Regnal titles
New title Dynasty founded	Sultan of the Seljuk Empire; 1037 – 4 October 1063	Succeeded by Alp Arslan
