= Al-Kunduri =

11th-century Seljuq Vizier (1055 – 1063)

al-Kunduri
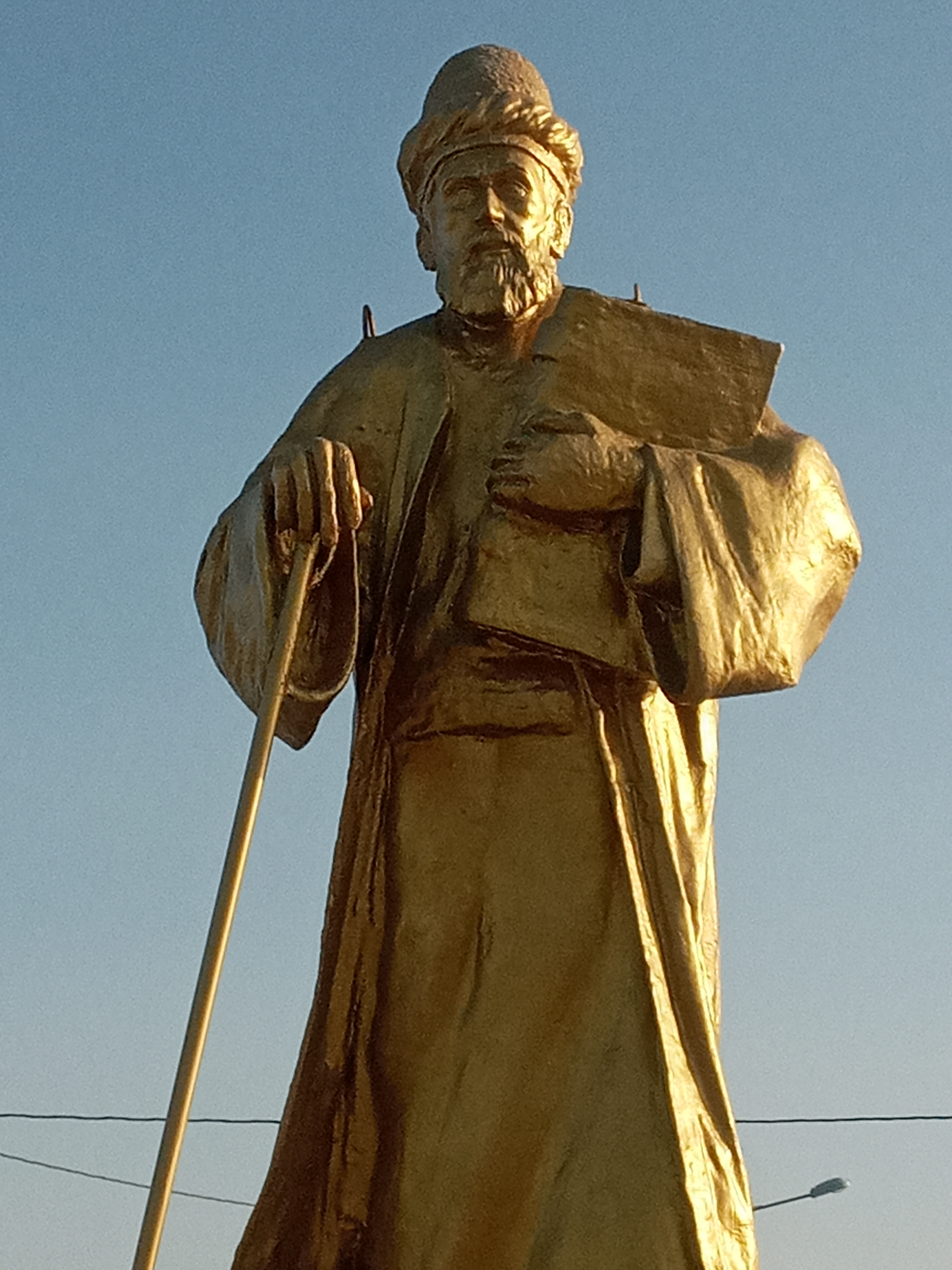
- Statue of al-Kunduri in his native city of Kondor, Iran

Vizier of the Seljuk Empire
- In office July/August 1055 – 1063
- Monarch: Tughril, Alp Arslan
- Preceded by: Nizam al-Mulk Dihistani
- Succeeded by: Nizam al-Mulk

Personal details
- Born: c. 1024 Kondor, Khurasan, Ghaznavid Empire
- Died: 29 November 1064 Marw-Rud, Khurasan, Seljuk Empire

Amid al-Mulk Abu Nasr al-Kunduri (Persian: عمیدالملک ابونصر الکندری; 1024 – 29 November 1064), commonly known as al-Kunduri (کندری; also spelled Kunduri), was a Persian bureaucrat, who served as the vizier of the first Seljuk Sultan Tughril (r. 1037–1063) and his nephew Alp Arslan (r. 1063–1072).

Kunduri was born in Kundur. He was recruited into the Seljuk bureaucracy as a secretary, at the suggestion of his teacher, Imam al-Muwaffaq al-Nishapuri. A natural schemer, Kunduri sought to exploit the power and influence over the Seljuk sultan.

Kunduri's first scheme was during his early vizierate when Tughril had tasked him to arrange a marriage between Tughril and a princess from the family of the Khwarazmshah. Instead, Kunduri arranged the marriage for himself. Kunduri subsequently went to Tughril, where he absolved himself by shaving off his beard and castrating himself. While Tughril was preparing a march towards Mosul to fight the local contender al-Basasiri in 1057, Kunduri plotted to install the son of Tughril's wife Altun Jan Khatun, Anushirwan, on the throne. However, the conspirators, including Altun Jan Khatun, quickly dissociated themselves from the conspiracy. Nevertheless, Kunduri was kept as vizier.

Kunduri's third scheme was against the Abbasid caliph al-Qa'im (r. 1031–1075), whom he successfully convinced to accept a marriage between his daughter and Tughril. After the death of Tughril in 1063, Kunduri attempted to install his infant nephew Sulayman (a son of Chaghri Beg) on the throne. It was, however, Chaghri Beg's more competent and elder son Alp Arslan, who ruled Khurasan, that ultimately ascended the throne. Kunduri was initially kept as vizier, but at the instigation of his peer Nizam al-Mulk, Alp Arslan had Kunduri imprisoned on 31 December 1063, and executed the following year, on 29 November 1064. Kunduri was succeeded by Nizam al-Mulk.

== Background ==
Kunduri was born in around 1024 as the son of a dehqan, possibly of Arab ancestry. His nisba suggests a connection to the profession of selling frankincense. The 12th-century Iranian author Sadr al-Din al-Husayni (fl. 1180–1225) says that Kunduri's place of birth is near Turaythith in Quhistan, the southern part of Khurasan. Kunduri has been referred to as a "Khurasani." Along with the poet Abu'l-Qasim Ali Bakharzi, Kunduri was educated in the Khurasanian principal city of Nishapur, by Imam al-Muwaffaq al-Nishapuri.

== Career ==
=== Under Tughril ===
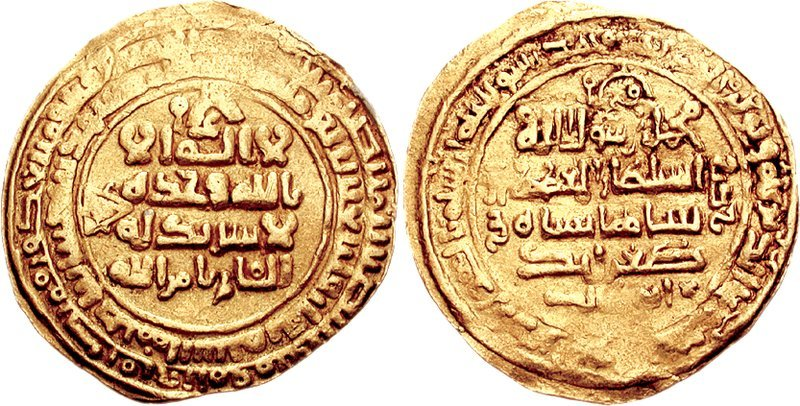
Gold dinar minted at Isfahan, engraved with the name of Tughril

When the first Seljuk Sultan Tughril (r. 1037–1063) conquered Nishapur in 1038, he told Imam al-Muwaffaq that he wanted a secretary who could speak both fluent Arabic and Persian. The latter recommended Kunduri, who was subsequently appointed a secretary of the chancery. In July or August 1055, Tughril appointed Kunduri as his vizier, thus succeeding Nizam al-Mulk Dihistani. During his vizierate, Kunduri began to assemble a standard Perso-Islamic state and this was continued under the following Seljuk sultans, Alp Arslan (r. 1063–1072) and Malik-Shah I (r. 1072–1092). Kunduri also acted as an interpreter for Tughril, translating Arabic and Persian into Turkic for him. As part of the Seljuk propaganda, Kunduri instructed the poet and dabir (scribe) Ibn Hassul to write an article that criticized the Kitab al-Taji of Ibrahim ibn Hilal al-Sabi, which was composed in 978 as Buyid propaganda, and connected them with the Sasanian ruler Bahram V (r. 420–438). The work of Ibn Hassul, amongst other things, connected the Seljuk family with Tur, a son of the mythological Iranian king Fereydun.

Kunduri sought to exploit the power and influence over the sultan. During his early vizierate, Kunduri was tasked by Tughril to arrange a marriage between Tughril and a princess from the family of the Khwarazmshah. Instead, he arranged the marriage for himself. Kunduri subsequently went to Tughril, where he absolved himself by shaving off his beard and castrating himself. While Tughril was preparing a march towards Mosul to fight the local contender al-Basasiri in 1057, Kunduri plotted to install the son of Tughril's wife Altun Jan Khatun, Anushirwan, on the throne. Seeing that he only had 2,000 soldiers at his departure, Tughril reprimanded Kunduri; "Why did you not inform me so that I could wait until all the men were assembled?"

During the subsequent rebellion of Tughril's half-brother Ibrahim Inal, the sultan requested the aid of Kunduri. Altun Jan initially wanted to help, but was persuaded by Kunduri that their soldiers would desert to Inal and only bolster his forces, in return further weakening Altun Jan and Tughril's army. Kunduri once again attempted to place Anushirwan on the throne, now with the support of Altun Jan, the Abbasid caliph al-Qa'im (r. 1031–1075), as well as the merchants and the leading officials of Baghdad. This plot was opposed by two of Tughril's generals, Umar and Inanjil, who rejected Anushirwan. When Kunduri requested al-Qa'im to announce Anushirwan as sultan, he told him to postpone the plot and secure the city against al-Basasiri. Altun Jan also had a change of heart and instead rejoined Tughril. The following details regarding the plot are unclear. Kunduri and Anushirwan continued to serve under Tughril, fighting alongside him against al-Basasiri, who was killed by a clerk of Kunduri.

Kunduri was a key figure in the negotiations with the reluctant caliph al-Qa'im to arrange a marriage between his daughter and Tughril. According to the Arab scholar Ibn al-Jawzi (died 1201), Kunduri had incited Tughril with this idea to counterbalance the marriage already arranged between Tughril's niece Arslan Khatun and al-Qa'im. Tughril, perhaps with the aspiration that one of his descendants one day might rule as caliph, became somewhat obsessed with the idea of marrying an Abbasid princess. Although Kunduri and al-Qa'im seemingly had a friendly relationship, they soon fell out due to the actions of the former. Between May and June 1061, Kunduri and al-Qa'im were in prolonged and resentful negotiations regarding the marriage, with Kunduri at some point even threatening to seize the iqta' (estates) of the caliph. Between February and March 1062, Kunduri finally convinced al-Qa'im to agree, in exchange for lucrative payment, and on the condition that his daughter was not to leave the caliphal palace. Kunduri ignored the latter term as the caliph's daughter was transported to Tughril's residence in Baghdad. Regardless, their marriage was only nominal and ended with Tughril's death on 4 September 1063, having lasted six months and twenty-three days.

=== Downfall and death ===
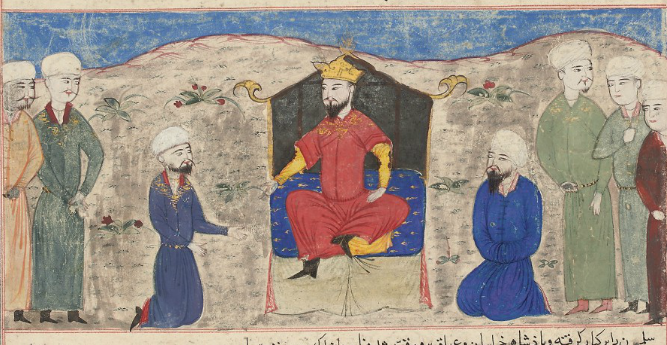
15th-century miniature from the Majma al-Tawarikh of Hafiz Abru, which depicts Alp Arslan's accession to the throne

Tughril had no children and thus had nominated his infant nephew Sulayman (a son of Chaghri Beg) as his successor. Kunduri supported this choice, and may have been the one to suggest it to Tughril to greatly expand his authority as the regent of the child. However, Chaghri Beg's more competent and elder son Alp Arslan, who ruled Khurasan, opposed this choice and had the support of the competent bureaucrat Nizam al-Mulk, as well as a powerful army in Khurasan. Kunduri quickly included the name of Sulayman in the khutba (Friday sermon) of the capital of Ray. He subsequently contacted Alp Arslan, threatening him and telling him to be satisfied with dominion over Khurasan. Tughril's cousin Qutalmish also emerged as a contestant for the throne, which led to peace and cooperation between Kunduri and Alp Arslan, who defeated and killed Qutalmish outside Ray. Alp Arslan thus succeeded to the sultanate, and retained Kunduri as vizier. However, at the instigation of Nizam al-Mulk, Alp Arslan had Kunduri imprisoned in Marw-Rud on 31 December 1063 and also had his property confiscated. Nizam al-Mulk was then made the vizier of the sultanate. After approximately a year in prison, Kunduri was murdered by two slave-soldiers sent by Alp Arslan on 29 November 1064. Other sources state that it was Nizam al-Mulk who executed him, lest he be returned to favour and once more become a rival. Upon his execution he is reported to have reproached Nizam al-Mulk:

What evil you have done, accustoming the Turks to killing viziers and the heads of dīwāns; whoever digs a hole falls into it!

Kunduri's sister took his body to Kundur, where it was buried. Al-Kunduri had a daughter.

== Beliefs ==
Al-Kunduri was Hanafi in fiqh and Mu'tazili in 'aqidah (Islamic theology). Kunduri included the cursing of the Ash'ari school in the khutba of Nishapur in 1053, which led to distinguished scholars, such as al-Qushayri and al-Juwayni to seek refuge in the Arabian region of Hijaz. Both medieval and modern sources largely agree that the act was political, done so that the Hanafi could occupy high offices. Kunduri seems to have later abandoned his zealotry.

== Legacy and assessment ==
A prominent figure in the Seljuk realm, Kunduri was praised by contemporary poets, such as Bakharzi. Kunduri composed Arabic poetry, supported the priests and poets of the realm, and was also an active builder. Kunduri was amongst the Iranian figures who helped the Seljuk rulers advance from that of tribal chieftains with limited power to that of "Most Exalted Sultans" (Salāṭīn-i A'ẓam) with a fully structured court, an Iranian administration, and an obedient partly slave army of multiple ethnicities. However, this transition also alienated the Seljuk sultans from the Turkmen, who, as a result, often rallied around rebellions led by disgruntled Seljuk family members, such as Inal and Qutalmish.

== Sources ==
- Bosworth, C. E. (1968). "The Political and Dynastic History of the Iranian World (A.D. 1000–1217)". In Frye, R. N. (ed.). The Cambridge History of Iran, Volume 5: The Saljuq and Mongol periods. Cambridge: Cambridge University Press. pp. 1–202. ISBN 978-0-521-06936-6. Archived from the original on 23 January 2022.
- Bosworth, C.E. (2000). "Ṭog̲h̲ri̊l (I) Beg". In Bearman, P. J.; Bianquis, Th.; Bosworth, C. E.; van Donzel, E. & Heinrichs, W. P. (eds.). The Encyclopaedia of Islam, Second Edition. Volume X: T–U. Leiden: E. J. Brill. ISBN 978-90-04-11211-7.
- Bosworth, C.E. (2011). "Kondori, Moḥammad b. Manṣur". In Yarshater, Ehsan (ed.). Encyclopædia Iranica. Vol. XV: Joči–Kašḡari, Saʿd-al-Din. London and New York: Routledge & Kegan Paul. ISBN 978-1-934283-29-5.
- Canard, Marius (1960). "al-Basāsīrī". In Gibb, H. A. R.; Kramers, J. H.; Lévi-Provençal, E.; Schacht, J.; Lewis, B. & Pellat, Ch. (eds.). The Encyclopaedia of Islam, Second Edition. Volume I: A–B. Leiden: E. J. Brill. pp. 1073–1075. OCLC 495469456.
- Durand-Guédy, David (2021). "al-Kundurī". In Fleet, Kate; Krämer, Gudrun; Matringe, Denis; Nawas, John; Rowson, Everett (eds.). Encyclopaedia of Islam (3rd ed.). Brill Online. ISSN 1873-9830.
- El-Azhari, Taef (2021). Queens, Eunuchs and Concubines in Islamic History, 661–1257. Edinburgh University Press. ISBN 978-1474423182.
- Makdisi, G. (1986). "al-Kundurī". In Bosworth, C. E.; van Donzel, E.; Lewis, B. & Pellat, Ch. (eds.). The Encyclopaedia of Islam, Second Edition. Volume V: Khe–Mahi. Leiden: E. J. Brill. pp. 387–388. ISBN 978-90-04-07819-2.
- Özaydın, Abdülkerim (2002). "Kündürî". TDV Encyclopedia of Islam, Vol. 26 (Ki̇li̇ – Kütahya) (in Turkish). Istanbul: Presidency of Religious Affairs, Centre for Islamic Studies. ISBN 978-975-389-406-7.
- Peacock, A. C. S. (2015). The Great Seljuk Empire. Edinburgh University Press. ISBN 978-0-7486-3826-0.
- Tetley, Gillies (2008). The Ghaznavid and Seljuk Turks: Poetry as a Source for Iranian History. Routledge. ISBN 978-1-134-08438-8.

Preceded by Abu Ahmad al-Dihistani	Vizier of the Seljuk Empire; 1054/5–1063	Succeeded by Nizam al-Mulk
