= Al-Walad al-Shafiq =

Al-Walad al-Shafiq ("The Compassionate Child") is a 1333 Persian-language work written by Qadi Ahmad of Niğde. It is preserved in a single manuscript completed in 1340 and stored at the Süleymaniye Library in Istanbul, Turkey. Its elaborate prose exhibits both Arabic and Turkish linguistic influences. The work is divided into five volumes, covering the lives of the prophets, Iranian and Islamic dynastic history, geography, the life of the Islamic prophet Muhammad and various religious and administrative subjects. The work was most likely dedicated to the Ilkhanid ruler Abu Sa'id Bahadur Khan (r. 1316–1335), although it barely mentions anything about the Mongols, and instead emphasizes the legitimacy of the Sultanate of Rum as the successor to the Seljuk Empire. It does so occasionally through historically inaccurate accounts and genealogies. The modern historian A. C. S. Peacock explains that the al-Walad al-Shafiq presents the image of nostalgia for the non-extant Seljuk dynasty. The work was most likely intended for a local audience in Qadi Ahmad's hometown of Niğde rather than the Ilkhanid court.

In the words of professor of Persian history Charles P. Melville: "This rather eccentric compilation can hardly perhaps be described as a work of history, yet it does contain much historical information (some of it inaccurate and deliberately misleading), especially about the Saljuqs of Rum".

== Sources ==
- Peacock, A. C. S. (2004). "Aḥmad of Niğde's al-Walad al-Shafῑq and the Seljuk past". Anatolian Studies. 54: 95–107.
- Melville, Charles (2012). "The Mongol and Timurid periods, 1250–1500". In Melville, Charles (ed.). A History of Persian Literature, Volume X. I.B.Tauris & Co Ltd.
