= Shah Malik =

11th-century Khwarazmshah and last ruler of the Oghuz Yabgu state

Shah Malik was the head of the Oghuz Yabghus of Jand and Yengi-kent (two towns near the mouth of the Syr Darya), and was also Khwarazmshah (1041–1042).

== Life ==
Shah Malik held the title of Yabgu (the traditional leader of the Oghuz). In 1034, the Seljuks, representatives of the Qiniq tribe of the Oghuz Turks who earlier we part of the Oghuz Yabgu State, split from the Yabghus and moved into Khwarazm at the invitation of its Ghaznavid governor, Harun. In a battle between Shah Malik and the Seljuks, the latter were defeated and forced to seek refuge in Ghaznavid Khurasan.

In 1038, the Ghaznavid sultan Mas'ud invested Shah Malik with the title of Khwarazm Shah. He did so in the hopes that Shah Malik would overthrow Harun's successor, Isma'il, who had become an enemy of the Ghaznavids. In the winter of 1040/1041, Shah Malik led his forces across the desert into Khwarazm. After fighting a long battle against Isma'il's troops he emerged victorious, forcing Isma'il to flee. He occupied the capital, Gurganj and placed Mas'ud's name in the khutba, although by this time Mas'ud was dead.

== Death ==
The Seljuks, however, would not allow Shah Malik to remain in Khwarazm. The Seljuk ruler Tughril and his brother Chaghri descended upon Khwarazm in 1042 and forced him from the province. He chose to flee to Kerman and then Makran (his territories of Jand and Yengi-kent may have been occupied by the Kipchaks, preventing him from returning there). He was eventually captured in Makran and turned over to Chaghri Beg, who ended his life.

Shah Malik's wife Altun Jan Khatun married Tughril around 1043, and their son Anushirvan remained with her after her marriage.

== Bibliography ==
- "Altuntas." Encyclopædia Iranica. 15 November 2006. <http://www.iranicaonline.org/articles/altuntas>

Preceded by Ismail Khandan	Governor of Khwarazm and Shah; Governor: 1038–1041 / Shah: 1041–1042	Succeeded by Seljuk rule
