= Altun Jan Khatun =

- Born: Khwarezm (?)
- Died: December 1060; Zanjan, Seljuk Empire
- Burial: Rey, Iran
- Spouse: Shah Malik; Tughril
- Issue: Anushirwan
- House: Seljuq (by marriage)
- Religion: Islam

Altun Jan Khatun (died December 1060) was the principal consort of Sultan Tughril I, the founder of the Seljuk Empire, ruling from 1037 to 1063. She was a highly influential and benevolent woman. She also wielded influence in state affairs and had a significant impact on Toghril’s decisions.

== Early life ==
Altun Jan Khatun was a Turkish woman, possibly from Khwarazm. Before becoming Tughril Beg's wife she had been married to the Khwarazm Shah Shah Malik. Her son by that marriage, Anushirwan, apparently remained with her after she married Tughril Beg in around 1043.

== Political influence ==
Tughril Beg is reported to have consulted his chief wife Altun Jan in affairs, Sibt ibn al-Jawzi states that she was a religious woman, much given to charitable works, of good judgement and firm determination.Alton Jan, the principal wife of Toghril Beg, according to Sebt ibn Jauzi, was a pious woman who engaged in charitable works, rendered fair judgments, and made wise, logical, and decisive decisions. The Sultan listened to her counsel and at times even referred judgments to her.

When Tughril Beg went to Hamadan in 1058 to deal with the revolt of Ibrahim Inal, he sent Altun Jan, Anushirwan and Al-Kunduri to Baghdad. Despite the Caliph's objection, Altun Jan went to join her husband at Hamadan, taking the treasury and Seljuk soldiery in Baghdad with her, leaving al-Kanduri. When Ibrahim Inal learnt of Altun Jan's approach he seems to have sent a force to have her intercepted. Other Turkmen joined Tughril Beg's forces, and defeated Ibrahim Inal. After this Tughril retired to Rey, where Altun Jan joined him.

In Tughril's last days, before al-Basasiri's seizure of the city, a convoluted plot had been hatched by Altun Jan and his vizier al-Kunduri to install Altun Jan's son, Anushirwan. However, Anushirwan attracted no support, and Altun Jan soon dissociated herself from the plot, all of whose conspirators appear to have been eventually restored to favor without further punishment.

== Death and aftermath ==
She died of edema in December 1060 in Zanjan. Tughril grieved for her greatly, and her bier was carried to Rey, where she was buried. She held estates in Iran. Just before her death she bequeathed her states, assignments and pensions to the Caliph's daughter Sayida Khatun. Tughril assigned these to the latter when the marriage contract between him and the caliph's daughter was finally concluded in 1062. She played a significant role in the Seljuk court. Toghril’s deep affection for his wife made her death a severe blow to him. He was so profoundly affected by this loss that he ordered her coffin to be transferred to Ray, where she was laid to rest. As one of the influential figures in the court, she had a hand in many political and social decisions.

According to some sources she requested Tughril to marry the caliph's daughter at her deathbed. After Tughril's death in 1063, Anushirwan rebelled but was captured. He was imprisoned in Rey and was killed.

== Sources ==
- Basan, Osman Aziz (January 24, 2010). The Great Seljuqs: A History. Routledge. ISBN 978-1-136-95393-4.
- Boyle, J. A., ed. (1968). The Cambridge History of Iran, Volume 5. Cambridge University Press. ISBN 978-0-521-06936-6.
- Gibb, Hamilton Alexander Rosskeen (1954). The Encyclopedia of Islam, Volume 6. Brill. ISBN 978-9-004-08112-3.
- Kupferschmidt, Uri M. (1987). The Supreme Muslim Council: Islam Under the British Mandate for Palestine. BRILL. ISBN 978-9-004-07929-8.
- Lambton, Ann K. S. (January 1, 1988). Continuity and Change in Medieval Persia. SUNY Press. ISBN 978-0-887-06133-2.
- Peacock, A. C. S. (January 1, 2015). The Great Seljuk Empire. Edinburgh University Press. ISBN 978-0-748-69807-3.
- Richards, D.S. (April 4, 2014). The Annals of the Saljuq Turks: Selections from Al-Kamil Fi'l-Ta'rikh of Ibn Al-Athir. Routledge. ISBN 978-1-317-83255-3.
- Türk dünyası araştırmaları - Issue 173. Türk Dünyası Araştırmaları Vakfı. 2008.
