= A. C. S. Peacock =

British historian and author (born 1976)

Andrew Charles Spencer Peacock FSA FBA is a British scholar and author. He specializes in the history, intellectual culture and manuscripts of the classical and early modern Islamic world.

== Life ==
He was born in 1976 and raised in Hampshire, England. After an undergraduate degree at St John's College Oxford, he completed his PhD in Oriental Studies at the University of Cambridge.

== Career ==
He is currently a professor of history at the University of St. Andrews. Peacock is a fellow of the Society of Antiquaries of London and a Fellow of the British Academy.

In 2025 he was awarded the Sheikh Zayed Book Award.

== Bibliography ==
His books include:

- Arabic Literary Culture in Southeast Asia in the Seventeenth and Eighteenth Centuries Brill (2024)
- Mediaeval Islamic Historiography and Political Legitimacy: Bal'ami's Tarikhnamah; Routledge (2007)
- The Frontiers of the Ottoman World (ed.); Oxford University Press for the British Academy (2009)
- Early Seljuq History: A New Interpretation; Routledge (2010)
- The Seljuks of Anatolia: Court and Society in the Medieval Middle East (ed. with Sara Nur Yıldız); I.B. Tauris (2013)
- The Great Seljuk Empire; The Edinburgh History of the Islamic Empires, Edinburgh University Press (2015)
- Islam and Christianity in Medieval Anatolia (ed. with Bruno De Nicola and Sara Nur Yıldız); Ashgate Publishing (2015)
- Medieval Central Asia and the Persianate World: Iranian Tradition and Islamic Civilisation (ed. with D. G. Tor); I.B. Tauris (2015)
- Court and Cosmos: The Great Age of the Seljuqs (with Sheila R. Canby, Deniz Beyazit, and Martina Rugiadi); Metropolitan Museum of Art (2016)
- Iran and Persianate Culture in the Indian Ocean World (ed.); Bloomsbury Publishing (2025)
