= Seljuk dynasty =

Oghuz Turkic dynasty

Seljuk dynasty: سلجك (Old Anatolian Turkish); Seljuklar (Turkmen); Selçuklular (Turkish); سلجوقیان (Persian)
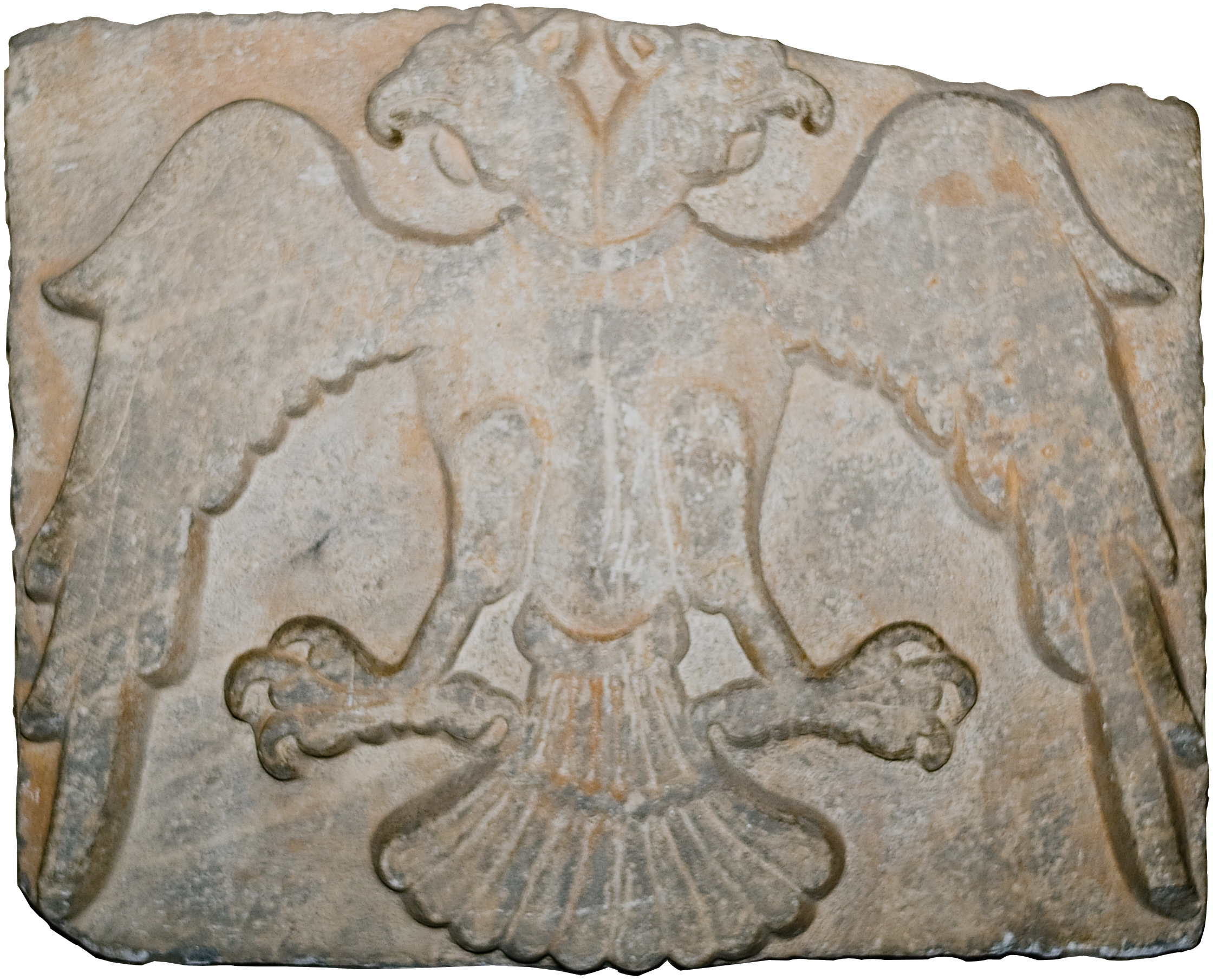
- Double-headed eagle, used as a symbol by several Seljuk rulers including Kayqubad I.
- Parent family: Oghuz Turks: Qiniq (tribe)
- Country: See List: Rule: Dominion at Jand; Dominion at Nur; Great Seljuk Empire; Kerman Seljuk Sultanate; Sultanate of Rum; Sultanate of Aleppo; Emirate of Damascus; Kubadoğulları Beylik; Kingdom of Georgia; Kingdom of Western Georgia; Kingdom of Eastern Georgia; Duchy of Imereti; Service: (Note: Byzantine Empire: Melikos and Soultanos families; Ottoman Empire: Sheikh Bedreddin's service and later rebellion; Kara-Khanid Khanate: Arslan Isra'il; Ghaznavid Empire: Settlement of Seljuks during Mahmud and Ma'sud's reign, before taking control of Khorasan; Ghurid Empire: Service of Muhammad-Shah II; Khazar Khanate: Service of Tuqaq; Samanid Empire: Service of Seljuk Beg and Arslan Isra'il); Byzantine Empire; Ottoman Empire; Kara-Khanid Khanate; Ghaznavid Empire; Ghurid Empire; Khazar Khanate; Samanid Empire; Oghuz Yabgu State
- Origin: Turkestan
- Founded: 985
- Founder: Seljuk
- Final ruler: Demetrius, Duke of Imereti
- Titles: See List: Head of the Seljuk Dynasty; Sultan of the Great Seljuk Empire; Sultan of Rum; Shah of Kermân (or Kirmân); Emir of Damascus; Emir of Aleppo; Kubadoğulları Emir; King of Georgia; King of Western Georgia; King of Eastern Georgia; Duke of Imereti
- Traditions: Sunni Islam (Hanafi); Tengrism; Eastern Orthodoxy (Note: Some Sultans of Rum maintained a dual Christian-Muslim identity, especially Kaykhusraw I and his later rulers. They are alleged to be baptized by Byzantines during exile or secretly by Christian concubines.); Georgian Orthodox Church; Ismailism
- Dissolution: 1455
- Deposition: See List: Initial Dominions: 1016 - Tughril I abandoned Jand 1025 - Yusuf ibn Musa executed by Ali-Tegin; Emirate of Damascus: 1104 – Baktāsh, dethroned by Toghtekin; Great Seljuk Empire: 1194 – Toghrul III was killed in battle with Tekish; Sultanate of Rum: 1308 – Mesud II died. De facto power falls under Mongol Ilkhanid Governers.; Kerman Seljuk Sultanate: 1186 - Muhammad II overthrown by Malik Dinar; Emirate of Aleppo: 1118 - Sultan Shah hands over Aleppo to Ilghazi; Kubadoğulları Beylik: 1422 - Kubadoğlu Hüseyin Bey surrenders Samsun to the Ottomans; Kingdom of Georgia: 1259 - David VI rebels against the Ilkhanate. Later, the kingdom splits into east and west; Kingdom of Eastern Georgia: 1292 - Death of Vakhtang II; Kingdom of Western Georgia: 1401 – After the death of Constantine II, George VII of Georgia invades Imereti. Local nobles capture Constantine's nephew Demetrius and hand him over to George, preventing his accession.; Duchy of Imereti: 1455 – Demetrius dies, ending the rule of David Narin's line in Imereti.

The Seljuk dynasty, or Seljukids (/ˈsɛldʒʊk/ SEL-juuk; Old Anatolian Turkish: سلجك Sälcük; Azerbaijani: Səlcuqlular or Səlcuqilər; Turkmen: Seljuklar; Ottoman Turkish: سلچوق Selçuk; Turkish: Selçuklular; Persian: سلجوقیان Saljuqian,) alternatively spelled as Saljuqids or Seljuk Turks, was an Oghuz Turkic, Sunni Muslim dynasty that culturally became Persianate and contributed to Turco-Persian culture.

The founder of the Seljuk dynasty, Seljuk Beg, was a descendant of a royal Khazar chief Tuqaq who served as advisor to the King of the Khazars, in West Asia and Central Asia. The Seljuks established the Seljuk Empire (1037–1194), the Sultanate of Kermân (1041–1186) and the Sultanate of Rum (1074–1308), which stretched from Iran to Anatolia and were the prime targets of the First Crusade.

== Early history ==
The Seljuks originated from the Kinik branch of the Oghuz Turks, who in the 8th century lived on the periphery of the Muslim world; north of the Caspian Sea and Aral Sea in their Oghuz Yabgu State in the Kazakh Steppe of Turkestan. During the 10th century, Oghuz had come into close contact with Muslim cities. When Seljuk, the leader of the Seljuk clan, had a falling out with Yabghu, the supreme chieftain of the Oghuz, he split his clan from the bulk of the Oghuz Turks and set up camp on the west bank of the lower Syr Darya. Around 985, Seljuk and his clan converted to Islam.

In the 11th century, the Seljuks migrated from their ancestral homelands into mainland Persia, in the province of Khurasan, where they encountered the Ghaznavids. The Seljuks defeated the Ghaznavids at the Battle of Nasa in 1035. Seljuk's grandsons, Tughril and Chaghri, received the insignias of governor, grants of land, and were given the title of dehqan. At the Battle of Dandanaqan, they defeated a Ghaznavid army, and after a successful siege of Isfahan by Tughril in 1050/51, established the Great Seljuk Empire. The Seljuks mixed with the local population and adopted the Persian culture and Persian language in the following decades.

== Later period ==
After arriving in Persia, the Seljuks adopted the Persian culture and used the Persian language as the official language of the government, and played an important role in the development of the Turko-Persian tradition which features "Persian culture patronized by Turkic rulers". Today, they are remembered as great patrons of Persian culture, art, literature, and language.

== Seljuk rulers ==
=== Rulers at Jand ===
Around 985-986, Seljuk Bey, who had great power and influence among the people of his tribe, left for Jand when his relations soured with the Oghuz Yabgu. After accepting Islam, Seljuk expelled the officials sent by the Oghuz Yabgu to Jand to collect the annual tax, saying "Muslims will not pay tribute to the unbelievers", and set up a war against the non-Muslim Turks.

This may well be proved by Al-Bayhaqi who calls Seljuk Beg as al-Malik al-Ghâzî Seljuk (meaning "ruler and religious fighter Seljuk"). Hence, a Seljuk dominion was established in Jand. The Saljuqids retained this dominion until 1016, when Toghrïl, with his brother Chaghri, left for Transoxania to join their uncle Isra'il, and also due to the frequent attacks of the Yabugu of Yengikent.

Sr.No	Ruler	Reign	Notes
1	Seljuk Bey	985-1009	Son of Tuqaq and founder of the Seljuk dynasty.; Died in 1009.
2	Toghrïl and Chaghri Beg	1009-1016	Sons of Mikail.; Abandoned Jand in 1016 to join Arslan Isra'il.

=== Rulers at Nur ===
When Samanid ruler Nuh II asked help from the Seljuks in 992, Seljuk Bey sent his son Isra'il to support him. With Arslan's help, the Samanids defeated the Karakhanids under Hasan ibn Sulayman and reclaimed some of their occupied lands, including Bukhara. In this connection, the town of Nur between Bukhara and Samarkand was given to the Seljuks as their homeland.

Ilig Khan Nasr recaptured Bukhara and Samarkand in 999, exiling Abd al-Malik II and his dynasty to Transoxiana. Later allying with Abu Ibrahim al-Muntasir, Isra'il defeated two more Karakhanid armies in 1003 and 1004, one involving Ilig Khan Nasr himself. However, the Seljuks then deserted Isma'il during another battle, and his army fell apart.

Seljuks later assisted Ali-Tegin in conquering Bukhara and establish his rule against Yusuf Qadir Khan. In 1025, Qadir Khan and Mahmud of Ghazni led an expedition against Ali-Tegin, which led to the imprisonment of Isra'il and the desertion of his community. The domain at Nur was also lost. The Turkoman then rallied around Tughril and Chaghri Bey, who later laid foundation to the Great Seljuk State.

Sr.No	Ruler	Reign	Notes
1	Arslan Isra'il	992-1025	Allied with the Samanids, and later with Ali Tegin.; Imprisoned at Kalinjar following the Ghaznavid expedition in 1025.
2	Yusuf ibn Musa Yabghu	1025-1029	Appointed by Ali-Tegin with the title "inanch-yabugu'.; Killed by Ali-Tegin's emir Alp-Qara.

=== Rulers of the Great Seljuk Empire ===
Following the battle of Nishapur in 1038, Tughril I established his rule in Khorasan with the title of Sultan. After the battle of Dandanaqan and subsequent conquests, the empire expanded, which ultimately led to the foundation of the Great Seljuk Empire.

The "Great Seljuks" were heads of the family; in theory their authority extended over all the other Seljuk lines, although in practice this often was not the case. Turkic custom called for the senior member of the family to be the Great Seljuk, although usually the position was associated with the ruler of western Persia.

No.	Image	Name	Reign	Life details
1		Toghrul I رکن الدین ابوطالبْ محمد طغرل بن میکائیل; Rukn ad-Dīn Abū Ṭālib Muḥammad Ṭughril ibn Mīkāʾīl	1037 – 4 October 1063 (~26 years)	993 – 4 October 1063 (aged 70): First Seljuk sultan; removed Buyids from Baghdad and became overlord of the Abbasid caliphs.
2		Alp Arslan ضياء الدين عضد الدولة محمد ألب أرسلان بن داود چغري; Ḍiyāʾ ad-Dīn ʿAḍud ad-Dawla Muḥammad Alp Arslān ibn Dāwūd Chaghrī	4 October 1063 – 15 December 1072 (~9 years)	20 January 1029 – 24 November 1072 (aged 43): Nephew of Toghrul; Defeated the Byzantines at Manzikert (1071); Assassinated
3		Malik-Shah I معز الدین جلال الدولة حسن ملک شاه بن آلپ ارسلان; Muʿizz ad-Dīn Jalāl ad-Dawla Ḥasan Malik-Shāh ibn Alp Arslān	15 December 1072 – 19 November 1092 (~20 years)	16 August 1055 – 19 November 1092 (aged 37): Son of Alp Arslan
4		Mahmud I ناصر الدین محمود بن ملک شاه; Nāṣir ad-Dīn Maḥmūd ibn Malik-Shāh	19 November 1092 – October 1094 (~2 years)	1088 – October 1094 (aged 5–6): Infant son of Malik Shah I; his mother Terken Khatun ruled as regent
5		Barkiyaruq رکن الدین ابوالمظفر برکیارق بن ملک شاه; Rukn ad-Dīn Abū'l-Muẓaffar Barkiyāruq ibn Malik-Shāh	1094 – 1105 (~11 years)	1079 or 1080 – 1105 (aged 25): Son of Malik Shah I; Fought civil wars against rival Seljuk princes; Died of tuberculosis
6		Malik-Shah II معز الدین ملک شاه بن برکیارق; Muʿizz ad-Dīn Malik-Shāh ibn Barkiyāruq	22 December 1104 – 13 February 1105 (~2 months)	Infant son of Barkiyaruq; Deposed and killed by Muhammad I Tapar
7		Muhammad I غیاث الدین محمد تاپار بن ملک شاه; Ghiyāth ad-Dīn Muḥammad Tapar ibn Malik-Shāh	13 February 1105 – 18 April 1118 (~13 years)	20 January 1082 – 18 April 1118 (aged 36): Son of Malik Shah I; Last Seljuk ruler with strong authority in the western realm.

The Great Seljuks were at their zenith under Malik-Shah I, stretching from Hejaz in the west to the Kara-Khanid frontier in the east. Following the death of Muhammad I Tapar, the empire split into two sections:-

- The Seljuks of Hamadan or the Iraqi Seljuks, who held loose control over the Abbasids in Baghdad and were often influenced by local atabegs, such as the Eldiguzids. It came to an end following the defeat of Tughril III by Ala al-Din Tekish.

No.	Image	Name	Reign	Life details
1		Mahmud II مغیث الدین جلال الدولة محمود بن محمد; Mughīth ad-Dīn Jalāl ad-Dawla Maḥmūd ibn Muḥammad	18 April 1118 – 11 September 1131 (~13 years)	c. 1104 – 11 September 1131 (aged ~27): Son of Muhammad I; succeeded him as ruler of Iraq and western Iran
2		Dawud مغیث الدین ابوالفتح داود بن محمود; Mughīth ad-Dīn Abū'l-Fatḥ Dāwūd ibn Maḥmūd	11 September 1131 – 1132 (~1 year)	1115 or 1117 – 1142 or 1143 (aged 26–28): Son of Mahmud II; Overthrown by his uncle Toghrul II; Reinstated in Baghdad in 1136
3		Tughril II رکن الدین ابوطالب طغرل بن محمد; Rukn ad-Dīn Abū Ṭālib Ṭughril ibn Muḥammad	1132 – 24 October 1134 (~2 years)	c. 1109 – 24 October 1134 (aged ~25): Son of Muhammad I; Held power with the backing of his uncle Sanjar; Died of illness on arriving at Hamadan
4		Masud غیاث الدین ابوالفتح مسعود بن محمد; Ghiyāth ad-Dīn Abū'l-Fatḥ Masʿūd ibn Muḥammad	24 October 1134 – 10 October 1152 (~18 years)	c. 1107 – 10 October 1152 (aged 44–45): Son of Muhammad I; Defeated and captured al-Mustarshid (1135)
5		Malik-Shah III مغیث الدین ملک شاه بن محمود; Mughīth ad-Dīn Malik-Shāh ibn Maḥmūd	10 October 1152 – April 1153 (~6 months)	c. 1128 – 25 March 1160 (aged ~32): Son of Mahmud II; Deposed by his brother Muhammad II
6		Muhammad II رکن الدین محمد بن محمود; Rukn ad-Dīn Muḥammad ibn Maḥmūd	1153 – 1159 (~6 years)	April 1128 – December 1159 or January 1160 (aged 31): Son of Mahmud II; Deposed his brother Malik-Shah III
7		Suleiman-Shah معز الدین ابوالحارث سلیمان‌شاه بن محمد; Muʿizz ad-Dīn Abū'l-Ḥārith Sulaymān-Shāh ibn Muḥammad	1159 – 1160 (~1 year)	October/November 1117 – 13 March 1161 (aged 43): Son of Muhammad I; Installed with the support of Qutb ad-Din Mawdud of Mosul; Murdered in Hamadan
8		Arslan-Shah رکن الدین ابوالمظفر ارسلان‌شاه بن طغرل; Rukn ad-Dīn Abū'l-Muẓaffar Arslan-Shāh ibn Ṭughril	1160 – 1176 (~16 years)	c. 1133 – 1176 (aged 42–43): Son of Toghrul II; Installed by the atabeg Eldiguz, who held real power
9		Toghrul III رکن الدین طغرل بن ارسلان‌شاه; Rukn ad-Dīn Ṭughril ibn Arslan-Shāh; 1st reign	1176 – 1191 (~15 years)	1168 or 1169 – 19 March 1194 (aged ~25): Deposed by Qizil Arslan in 1191
Eldiguzid Qizil Arslan deposed Tughril III, but he comes back to power after his death.
(9)		Toghrul III رکن الدین طغرل بن ارسلان‌شاه; Rukn ad-Dīn Ṭughril ibn Arslan-Shāh	1192 – 19 March 1194 (~2 years)	1168 or 1169 – 19 March 1194 (aged ~25): Killed near Rey in battle against Khwarazmshah Tekish

- The Seljuks of Khorasan, which came to an end after the death of Ahmad Sanjar.

No.	Image	Name	Reign	Life details
1		Ahmad Sanjar معز الدین عضد الدولة ابوالحارث احمد سنجر بن ملک شاه; Muʿizz ad-Dīn ʿAḍud ad-Dawla Abū'l-Ḥārith Aḥmad Sanjar ibn Malik-Shāh	18 April 1118 – 8 May 1157 (~39 years)	6 November 1086 – 8 May 1157 (aged 70): Son of Malik Shah I; succeeded Muhammad I as ruler of Khorasan. Last Seljuk ruler in the East and the senior sultan over the sultans in west, Lost lands beyond Syr Darya at Qatwan (1141); Captured by the Oghuz from 1153 to 1156.

=== Rulers of the Kerman Seljuk Sultanate ===
Extent of the Kerman Seljuk Sultanate under its later rulers.

The Kerman Seljuk Sultanate was established in the aftermath of the Conquest of Kerman by Qavurt, the son of Chaghri Bey. It's strong rulers include Arslan Shah I and Qavurt himself. It dissolved after the invasion of the Ghuzz Turks under Malik Dinar in 1187.

No.	Image	Name	Reign	Life details
1		Qavurt عماد الدين كارا أرسلان أحمد قاوورد بن داود چغري; Imad al-Dīn Kāra Arslān Ahmad Qavurt ibn Dāwūd Chaghrī	1041 – 1073 (~32 years)	? – 1073: First Seljuk sultan in Kerman; occupied Kerman, Makran, Oman and Shiraz through conquest.; Led an unsuccessful attempt to seize the Great Seljuk throne.
2		Kerman Shah كرمان شاه بن كارا أرسلان أحمد قاوورد; Kīrman Shah ibn Kāra Arslān Ahmad Qavurt	1073 – 1074 (~1 year)	? – 1074: Son of Qavurt.; Acted as regent in 1073 when Qavurt left for battle.
3		Sultan Shah سلطان شاه بن كارا أرسلان أحمد قاوورد; Rukn ad-Dīn wa-'d-Daula Sultān-Šāh Isḥāq ibn Kāra Arslān Ahmad Qavurt	1074 – 1075 (~1 year) 1074 - 1085 (~11 years) (Note: There are two versions of Sultan Shah's and Hussain Omar's rule in Kerman.)	? – ?: Son of Qavurt.; Submitted to Malik-Shah I following a punitive expediton.
4		Hussain Omar حسين عمر بن كرمان شاه; Hussaīn Omar ibn Kīrman Šāh	1075 - 1085 (~10 years) 1074 (~a few months)	? – ?: Son of Qavurt.
5		Turan Shah I محيي الدين عماد الدولة والدين ملك تورانشاه بن كارا أرسلان أحمد قاوورد; Muhī al-Dīn İmam ed-Dawla wa al-Dīn Turān Shāh ibn Kāra Arslān Ahmad Qavurt	1085 – 1096 (~11 years)	? – 1096: Son of Qavurt.; Recaptured Fars and repelled Emir Unar's expedition.
6		Iran Shah بهاالدین ایران شاه بن تورانشاه; Bahā al-Dīn wa ad-Dawla Irān Shāh ibn Turān Shāh	1096 - 1101 (~5 years)	1059 – 1101 (aged ~41 years): Son of Turan Shah I.; Killed during the Çolak Bëzdar rebellion due to his adoption of Ismailism.
7		Arslan Shah I أرسلان شاه بن كرمان شاه; Muḥyī ’l-Islām wa-’l-Muslimīn Arslan-Šāh ibn Kīrman Shāh	November 16, 1101 - 1142 (~41 years)	? – 1145: Son of Kerman Shah.; Repelled the attacks of Jawali Saqawa.; Imprisoned and dethroned by his son Muhammad Shah I.
8		Muhammad Shah I مُعيص الدنيا والدين محمد بن أرسلان شاه; Muġīṯ ad-Dunyā wa-’d-Dīn Muḥammad ibn Arslan-Šāh	1142 - June 27, 1156 (~14 years)	? – June 27, 1156: Dethroned his elderly father and prevailed as ruler of Kerman against his brothers Kīrman-Shah (heir apparent) and Saljuk-Shah, who took over Oman.; Took great interest in astronomy, had libraries built in Kerman.
9		Tuğrul Shah معيط الدنيا والدين طغرل شاه بن محمد شاه; Muġīṯ ad-Dunyā wa-’d-Dīn Tuğrul Shah ibn Muhammad Šāh	June 27, 1156 - March 1170 (~14 years)	? – March 1170: Son of Muhammad Shah I.; Maintained friendly relations with the Salghurids.
10		Bahram Shah أبو منصور بهرام شاه بن طغرل شاه; Abū Manṣūr Bahrām-Šāh ibn Tuğrul Šāh	March 1170 - 1170 (~a few months)	? – March 1175: First Reign.; Son of Tuğrul Shah.; Supported by Atabeg Mu'ayyed ed-Din Reyhan.
11		Arslan Shah II أرسلان شاه بن طغرل شاه; Arslān-Šāh ibn Tuğrul Šāh	circa. 1170 (~a few months)	? - March 3, 1177: First Reign.; Son of Tuğrul Shah.; Supported by Qutub al-Din Mohammad ibn Bozkuş, his brother Terken Shah, and the Atabeg of Yazd
(10)		Bahram Shah أبو منصور بهرام شاه بن طغرل شاه; Abū Manṣūr Bahrām-Šāh ibn Tuğrul Šāh	circa. 1171 (~a few months)	? – March 1175: Second Reign.
(11)		Arslan Shah II أرسلان شاه بن طغرل شاه; Arslān-Šāh ibn Tuğrul Šāh	circa. 1172 - 1175 (~3 years)	? - March 3, 1177: Second Reign.
(10)		Bahram Shah أبو منصور بهرام شاه بن طغرل شاه; Abū Manṣūr Bahrām-Šāh ibn Tuğrul Šāh	1175 - March 1175 (~a few months)	? – March 1175: Third Reign.
12		Muhammad II Shah محمد شاه بن أبي منصور بهرام شاه; Muhammad Šāh ibn Abū Manṣūr Bahrām-Šāh	circa. 1175 (~a few days)	circa. 1147 – 1187: First Reign.; Supported by Qutub al-Din Mohammad ibn Bozkuş.
(11)		Arslan Shah II أرسلان شاه بن طغرل شاه; Arslān-Šāh ibn Tuğrul Šāh	1175 - March 3, 1177 (~1 year)	? - March 3, 1177: Third Reign.; Killed in battle with Turan Shah II.
13		Yawlak ibn Arslan Shah يافلاك بن أرسلان شاه; Yawlak ibn Arslān-Šāh	March 1177 (~a few days)	? - ?: Son of Arslan Shah II.; Blinded by Turan Shah II.
14		Turan Shah II توران شاه بن طغرل شاه; Tūrān-Šāh ibn Tuğrul Šāh	March 3, 1177 - June 1183 (~5 years)	? - June 1183: Supported by the Salghurids.; Son of Tuğrul Shah.; Assassinated by Zafir Muhammad Amirek.
(12)		Muhammad II Shah محمد شاه بن أبي منصور بهرام شاه; Muhammad Šāh ibn Abū Manṣūr Bahrām-Šāh	June 1183 - September 1187 (~3 years)	circa. 1147 – 1187: Second Reign.; Placed on the throne by Zafir Muhammad Amirek, who was later killed by him.; Overthrown by Oghuz chieftain Malik Dinar.; Sought help from Great Seljuks of Iraq, followed by the ruler of Bam and later Ala al-Din Tekish.; Lived his life in exile in service of the Ghurids.

Hence, Kerman fell into the hands of the Oghuz chief Malik Dinar. Kerman was eventually annexed by the Khwarazmian Empire in 1196.

=== Seljuks of Syria ===
Seljuks of Aleppo and Damascus circa. 1097

The Seljuks of Syria were rulers belonging to the lineage of Tutush I, primarily ruling from their historic seat at Aleppo or Damascus. Although they operated as different polities, they often collaborated with one another in several periods such as the First Crusade.

The Seljuk Emirate of Damascus was the first one to be established in 1079, although central authority under the Great Seljuks existed as early as 1076, when Atsiz ibn Uwaq was governor. The Seljuk Sultanate of Aleppo were established later in 1086, when Tutush seized Aleppo.

The two polities united only for two brief periods: (May 1086 – December 1086) and (27 May 1094 - 25 February 1095), under the rule of Tutush himself.

==== Rulers of the Sultanate of Aleppo ====
In 1086, the city of Aleppo was besieged by Suleiman ibn Qutalmish, the Sultan of Rum, during his campaigns in Syria. Hassan ibn Hibat Allah Al-Hutayti, the Chief of Aleppo, requested help from Tutush I, the Emir of Damascus, promising to surrender the city to him. Thereupon Tutush marched on Suleiman, and defeated him at the Battle of Ain Salm.

However, Hassan did not fulfill his promise to hand over the city. Hence, Tutush marched on Hassan, subsequently besieging and occupying Aleppo in May 1086. Thereafter, he declared himself the Sultan of Aleppo and Damascus.

This led to the foundation of the Seljuk Sultanate of Aleppo. The Sultanate dissolved when Sultan Shah, the grandson of Tutush handed over the city to the Artukid emir Ilghazi. This was followed by an unsuccessful siege, thereby completely ending the Seljuk domain in Aleppo.

No.	Image	Name	Reign	Life details
After the Battle of Ain Salm in 1086, Tutush I besieged and captured Aleppo from its chief Hassan ibn Hibat Allah al-Hutayti, declaring himself the Emir of Aleppo.
1		Tutush I أبو سعيد تاج الدولة تتش السلجوقي; Abū Saʿīd Tāj al-Dawla Tutush al-Saljūkī	May 1086 – December 1086 (~8 months)	? – 25 February 1095: First Reign.; Abandoned Aleppo due to the adavance of Malik-Shah's armies.
2		Malik-Shah I معز الدین جلال الدولة حسن ملک شاه بن آلپ ارسلان; Muʿizz ad-Dīn Jalāl ad-Dawla Ḥasan Malik-Shāh ibn Alp Arslān	December 1086 – 19 November 1092 (~5 years)	16 August 1055 – 19 November 1092 (aged 37): Directly ruled Aleppo in December 1086.; Ruled Aleppo from December 1086 to 19 November 1092 as overlord of Aq Sunqur al-Hajib.
With the intervention of Malik Shah I, Aq Sunqur al-Hajib, a Non-Seljuqid, was installed as the governor of Aleppo. Aq Sunqur al-Hajib continuously switched alliegances, after finally being beheaded by Tutush I in 1094.
3		Mahmud I ناصر الدین محمود بن ملک شاه; Nāṣir ad-Dīn Maḥmūd ibn Malik-Shāh	19 November 1092 – 1093 (~a few months)	1088 – October 1094 (aged 5–6): Aq Sunqur al-Hajib pledged allegiance to him.
(1)		Tutush I أبو سعيد تاج الدولة تتش السلجوقي; Abū Saʿīd Tāj al-Dawla Tutush al-Saljūkī	circa. 1093 (~a few months)	? – 25 February 1095: Second Reign.; Aq Sunqur al-Hajib pledged allegiance to him.
4		Barkiyaruq رکن الدین ابوالمظفر برکیارق بن ملک شاه; Rukn ad-Dīn Abū'l-Muẓaffar Barkiyāruq ibn Malik-Shāh	1093 – 27 May 1094 (~1 year)	1079 or 1080 – 1105 (aged 25): Aq Sunqur al-Hajib pledged allegiance to him.; Aq Sunqur was executed by Tutush on 27 May 1094.
(1)		Tutush I أبو سعيد تاج الدولة تتش السلجوقي; Abū Saʿīd Tāj al-Dawla Tutush al-Saljūkī	27 May 1094 - 25 February 1095 (~1 year)	? – 25 February 1095: Third Reign.; Executed Aq Sunqur al-Hajib.; Killed during his war of succession against Barkiyaruq.
5		Fakhr al-Mulk Ridwan فخر الملك رضوان بن تتش; Fakhr al-Mulk Riḍwān ibn Tutush	25 February 1095 - 10 December 1113 (~18 years)	1077 – 10 December 1113 (aged 36): Son of Tutush I.; Fought against the Crusaders in the Siege of Antioch, Battle of the Lake of Antioch, and later with Tancred.; Repelled Jawali Saqawa in the Battle of Turbessel (1108) and Kilij Arslan in the Battle of Khabur River (1107).
6		Alp Arslan al-Akhras تاج الدولة ألب أرسلان الأخرس بن رضوان; Tāj ad-Dawlah Alp Arslān al-Akhras ibn Riḍwān	10 December 1113 - September 1114 (~1 year)	December 1097 – September 1114 (aged ~17): Son of Ridwan.; Actual power held by Lu'lu' al-Yaya.
7		Sultan Shah ibn Radwan سلطان شاه بن رضوان; Sulṭān Shāh ibn Riḍwān	September 1114 - 1118 (~3 years)	1108 – ?: Son of Ridwan.; Actual power held by Lu'lu' al-Yaya and later Amina Khatun.; Handed over Aleppo to Ilghazi, thereby ending the Seljuk Sultanate of Aleppo.
Sultan Shah ibn Radwan handed over Aleppo to the Artuqids, but still acted as a claimant. He also participated in the Siege of Aleppo (1124–1125), in hopes of reviving the sultanate.

==== Rulers of the Emirate of Damascus ====
Atsiz ibn Abaaq al-Khwarazmi, a prominent Seljuk general, had seized Damascus and Palestine from the Fatimids and established himself as governor of both regions by 1076. However, he suffered a great defeat at the hands of the Fatimid vizier Badr al-Jamali during his Egyptian campaign. Capitalising on his victory, Badr al-Jamali sent his general Nasr al-Dawla to besiege Damascus.

Thereupon, Atsiz appealed to the Seljuks, and soon an army under Tutush I, brother of the Great Seljuk sultan Malik-Shah I, marched towards Damascus, scaring off the Fatimid forces. Tutush, however, decided to take control of Atsiz's territories and had him first imprisoned, then strangled with a bowstring in October 1079. Subsequently, he proclaimed himself the Emir of Damascus.

Hence, the Seljuk Emirate of Damascus was established. The Emirate dissolved with the death of Tutush II in 1104, when Atabeg Toghtekin assumed power and founded the Burid dynasty.

No.	Image	Name	Reign	Life details
Tutush I seizes Damascus from Atsiz and executes him.
1		Tutush I أبو سعيد تاج الدولة تتش السلجوقي; Abū Saʿīd Tāj al-Dawla Tutush al-Saljūkī	1079 – 25 February 1095 (~16 years)	? – 25 February 1095: Son of Alp Arslan.; Besieged Aleppo thrice, succeeding in the third.; Killed in the war of succession against Berkyaruq.
2		Duqaq أبو نصر شمس الملوك دقاق بن تتش; Abū Naṣr Shams al-Mulūk Duqāq ibn Tutush	February 1095 - 6 June 1104 (~9 years)	? - 6 June 1104: Son of Tutush I and Safwat al-Mulk.; Supported by Ilghazi and Yağısıyan.; Participated in the First Crusade.; Died due to tuberculosis on 6 June 1104.
3		Tutush II تتش بن دقاق بن تتش السلجوقي; Tutush ibn Duqāq ibn Tutush al-Saljūkī	6 June 1104 - 10 October 1104 (~4 months)	1103 - 1104/05 (~1 year): First reign.; Actual power held by regent Toghtekin.; Replaced briefly by Irtash.
4		Baktāsh (Irtāsh) إرتاش بن تتش السلجوقي; Irtāsh ibn Tutush al-Saljūkī	10 October 1104 - 1104 (~a few months)	1092 - ?: Son of Tutush I.; Made an alliance with Baldwin I of Jerusalem and later with Jawali Saqawa.; Replaced by Tutush II under Toghtekin.
(3)		Tutush II تتش بن دقاق بن تتش السلجوقي; Tutush ibn Duqāq ibn Tutush al-Saljūkī	circa. 1104 (~a few days)	1103 - 1104/05 (~1 year): Second reign.; Actual power held by regent Toghtekin.; Died soon after succession, ending the Seljuk Emirate of Damascus.
Damascus seized by Burid Toghtekin, who established the Burid dynasty.

=== Seljuk sultans of Rum (Anatolia) ===
No.	Image	Ruler	Reign	Life details
Facing persecution by Malik Shah I, Suleiman ibn Qutalmish along with his brothers fled towards the Taurus Mountains in Anatolia. Malik Shah frequently sent commanders such as Atsiz, Porsuk and Bozan against the sons of Qutalmish. As the years went by, Emir Mansur and Suleiman successfully established their rule in Western Anatolia and began to interfere with Byzantine politics.
1		Mansur ibn Qutalmish and Suleiman ibn Qutulmish	1072 - 1078 (~6 years)	Sons of Qutalmish.; Established rule in Western Anatolia.
Following the death of Mansur, Suleiman captured Nicaea and established the Sultanate of Rum in 1078.
No.	Image	Sultan	Reign	Life details
(1)		Suleiman I سُلَیمانشاہ بن قُتَلمِش; Sulaymān ibn Qutalmish	1078 - 5 June 1086 (~8 years)	1041 – 5 June 1086 (aged 45): Son of Qutalmish.; Founded the Seljuk Sultanate of Rum in 1077, with its capital at Nicaea.; Killed at the Battle of Ain Salm in 1086.
Two regents namely Abu'l-Qasim and Abu'l-Hasan Ghazi ruled between 1086 and 1092. They do not belong to the Seljuk dynasty.
2		Kilij Arslan I قِلِیچ اَرسلان بن سُلَیمانشاہ; Dāwūd Qilij Arslān ibn Sulaymān Shāh	1092 – 13 July 1107 (~15 years)	1079 – 13 July 1107 (aged 27–28): Son of Suleiman ibn Qutalmish.; Deposed Abu'l Hasan Gazi.; Shifted the capital to Konya due to the First Crusade.; Repelled the Crusade of 1101.; Died at the Battle of Khabur River in 1107.
Interregnum (1107 - 1110)
3		Malik Shah مَلِكشاه بن قِلِیچ اَرسلان; Mālik Shāh ibn Dāwūd Qilij Arslān	1110 – 1116 (~6 years)	1096 - 1116 (aged 19–20): Son of Kilij Arslan I.; Held prisoner in Isfahan until 1110.; Was in constant conflict with his brothers (Rukn-al-Din Mesud, Melik Arab and Togrul Arslan).; Made Rum a Byzantine vassal after the Battle of Philomelion (1116).; Deposed by Rukn-al-Din Mesud.
—		Melik Toğrul Arslan طُغْرُلْ أَرْسْلَانْ بن قِلِیچ اَرسلان; Tuğhril Arslān ibn Dāwūd Qilij Arslān	1107 - 1124 (~17 years)	? - ?: Son of Kilij Arslan I.; Ruled Malatya as an independent branch of Rum.; Deposed by Rukn-al-Din Mesud.
4		Mesud I رُكْنُ الدِّين مَسْعُود بِن قِلِیچ اَرْسْلَان; Rukn al-Dīn Masʿūd ibn Dāwūd Qilij Arslān	1116 – 1156 (~40 years)	1095 – 1156 (aged 60–61): Son of Kilij Arslan I.; Made Rum a Danishmendid vassal after deposing Malik Shah.; Became independent after the death of Melik Mehmed Gazi.; Suppressed the rebellions of Melik Arapsah and Tugrul Arslan.; Defended against the Second Crusade.; Died after his campaign in Cilicia.
—		Melik Arab ملک عرب بن قلچ ارسلان; Malik ʿArab ibn Qilīj Arslān	1126 (~a few months)	? - ?: Son of Kilij Arslan I.; Claimed the throne around 1126.; Supported by the Armenian Kingdom of Cilicia.; Besieged Iconium in 1126, failed to take official power.
5		Kilij Arslan II عز الدین قلج ارسلان بن مسعود ʿIzz ad-Dīn Kilij Arslān ibn Masʿūd	1156 – August 1192 (~36 years)	1113 – August 1192 (aged 78–79): Son of Mesud I.; Completely dissolved the Danishmendids.; Dealt a decisive blow to Manuel I Komnenos at the Battle of Myriokephalon.; Was defeated at Philomelion and Konya, briefly losing his capital.; Engaged in a succession conflict with his son Qutub-al-Din.
Kilij Arslan chose to divide his sultanate to his 11 sons. Initially, they were obedient towards their father and were allowed to mint coins and have the khutba read in their name. When the eldest son Qutub ad-Dīn seized de facto power in 1190, all the others began to act independently, laying 11 claims in opposition to 1 de jure Sultan. (Note: May be considered 10 because Kaykhusraw I chose to side with his father) List of claimants at the end of Kilij Arslan II's reign: No. / Name / Region / Claimancy and details; 1 / Qutub-al-Din Malikshah / Sivas and Aksaray / 1189 - 1192: Son of Kilij Arslan II.; Instigated a failed rebellion against his father in 1189 in Konya.; Seized de facto power in 1190, when his father abandoned Konya.; Declared himself Sultan in 1192 and marched on Kayseri.; Defeated in 1192 by Kilij Arslan II and deposed.

- Malik Shah II (claimant)
- Sons of Kilij Arslan II (regional claimants)
- Ghiyath ad-Din Kaykhusraw I 1192–1196
- Suleyman II (Suleiman) 1196–1204
  Suleiman established his brother Tughril Shah as the de facto ruler of Erzurum. Tughril's son Jahan Shah also ruled in Erzurum. Their rule ended with the intervention of Kayqubad I.
- Kilij Arslan III 1204–1205
- Ghiyath ad-Din Kaykhusraw I (second time) 1205–1211
- Izz ad-Din Kaykaus I 1211–1220
- Ala ad-Din Kayqubad I 1220–1237
- Ghiyath ad-Din Kaykhusraw II 1237–1246
- Izz ad-Din Kaykaus II 1246–1260
- Rukn ad-Din Kilij Arslan IV 1248–1265
- Ala ad-Din Kayqubad II 1249–1257
- Ghiyath ad-Din Kaykhusraw III 1265–1282
- Ghiyath ad-Din Mesud II 1282–1284
- Ala ad-Din Kayqubad III 1284
- Ghiyath ad-Din Mesud II (second time) 1284–1293
- Ala ad-Din Kayqubad III (second time) 1293–1294
- Ghiyath ad-Din Mesud II (third time) 1294–1301
- Ala ad-Din Kayqubad III (third time) 1301–1303
- Ghiyath ad-Din Mesud II (fourth time) 1303–1307
- Ghiyath ad-Din Mesud III 1307–1308 (possibly claimant)
- Kilij Arslan V (claimant, declared rule in Konya)
  Seljuks of Rum effectively ended with the Karamanid conquests of Konya. Tâceddin Altunbaş, a son of Mesud II, established the Kubadoğulları Emirate in Samsun around 1318. His sons would continue to rule the emirate until 1422, before submitting to the Ottomans.

=== Kubadoğulları Emirs ===
- Tâcüddîn Altunbaş
- Keykubad Bey
- Kubadoğlu Ali Bey
- Kubadoğlu Cüneyd Bey
- Kubadoğlu Hüseyin Bey

== Historic seat ==
The rulers of the Seljuk dynasty had their historic seat at their administrative capitals.

No.	Cadet Branch	Seat	Duration
1	Rulers at Jand الهيمنة السلجوقية في جند	Jand	985 - 1016
2	Rulers at Nur السيادة السلجوقية في نور	Nur	992 - 1029
3	The Great Seljuks سلجوقیان بزرگ	Nishapur	1037 - 1043
3	The Great Seljuks سلجوقیان بزرگ	Ray	1043 - 1051
3	The Great Seljuks سلجوقیان بزرگ	Isfahan	1051–1118
3	The Great Seljuks سلجوقیان بزرگ	Seljuks of Iraq: Hamadan	18 April 1118 - 19 March 1194
3	The Great Seljuks سلجوقیان بزرگ	Seljuks of Khorasan: Merv	18 April 1118 - 1153
4	Seljuks of Kerman سلطنة كرمان السلجوقية	Bardsir (Kerman)	1048 - 1187
4	Seljuks of Kerman سلطنة كرمان السلجوقية	Bam	1187

== Comparative genealogy ==
The comparative genealogy of the Sultanate of Rûm with their contemporary neighbors in Central Asia

Tuqaq Temur; Beg; Commander-in-chief of the Oghuz army	Ma'munid rulers in Chorasmia (r. 995–1117)
Seljuk Beg; The founder of Seljuk dynasty	Altun Tash (1017–1032)
Arslan Yabgu; Chief of Seljuk dynasty	Mikail ibn Seljuk	The mother of Toghrul I, Chaghri, Ibrahim & Artash	Yûsuf Inal	Yûnus	Mûsâ(İnanç)Yabgu	Harun (r. 1032–1035)	Ismail Khandan (r. 1035–1041)
Rasūl Tagīn	Qutalmish; Father of the founder of Anatolian Seljuk Sultanate	Toghrul Beg; First sultan of the Seljuks (r. 1037–1063)	Chaghri Beg; Co-ruler of the Seljuk dynasty	Ibrahim Inal	Artash Inal	Abu Ali Hasan Yabgu	Yûsuf, Kara Arslan, Abu Bakr, Umar, Bori & Dawlatshah	Shah Malik (r. 1041–1042)
Mānsūr	Suleyman I Shah of Rûm (r. 1077–1086)	Alp Ilig and Dawlat	Suleiman (r. 1063)	Alp Arslan (r. 1063–1072)	Kavurt Beg (r. 1048–1073); Kirman Seljuks	Seljuk rule in Khwarazm (r. 1042–1077)
Abu'l-Qasim (İznik) (r. 1086–1092)	Abu'l Ghazi Hasan Bey (Kayseri)	Malik-Shah I (r. 1072–1092)	Kīrmān Shah (r. 1073–1074)	Sultan Shah (r. 1074–1085)	Turan I Shah (r. 1085–1097)	Anūsh Tekīn (r. 1077–1097)
Ayisha Khātun (r. in Malatya)	Kilij Arslan I (r. 1092–1107)	Kulan Arslan (Dāvûd)	Mahmud I (r. 1092–1094)	Barkiyaruq (r. 1092–1104)	Arslan Shah I (r. 1101–1142)	Muhammad I Mālīk Shah (r. 1142–1156)	Îrânshah (r. 1097–1101)	Ekinchi (r. 1097)
Toghrul Arslan (r. 1107–1124)	Malīk Shah of Rûm (r. 1110–1116)	Muhammad I Tapar (r. 1105–1118)	Malik-Shah II (r. 1104–1105)	Toghrul Shah (r. 1156–1170)	Bahrām Shah (r. 1170 - 1175); Arslan II Shah (r. 1170 - 1177)	Turan II Shah (r. 1177–1183); Muhammad II (r. 1183–1187)	Qutbū'd-Dīn; Muhammad (r. 1097–1127)
Gündüz Alp	Rukn ad-Dīn Mas'ūd I (r. 1116–1156)	Malīk Arab (r. 1116–1127) in Ankara	Ahmad Sanjar (r. 1118–1153); Last Sultan of The Great Seljuk	Mahmud II (r. 1118–1131); First sultan of The Iraqi Seljuks	Toghrul II (r. 1132–1134); Masud (r. 1134–1152)	Suleiman-Shah (r. 1159–1160)	Qizil Arslan (r. 1191) de facto ruler of Toghrul III; Atabeg of the Eldiguzids	ʿAlāʾ ad-Dīn Ātsız (r. 1127–1156)
Danismendli Grooms Yağıbasan (Sivas) & ZūnNūn (Kayseri)	ʿIzz ad-Dīn; Kilij Arslan II (r. 1156–1192)	Malīk Shāhīn Shāh (Ankara, Çankırı, Kastamonu); Daulat	Dawud (r. 1131–1132)	Malik-Shah III (r. 1152–1153); Muhammad II (r. 1153–1159)	Arslan-Shah (r. 1160–1177)	Toghrul III (r. 1177–1191, 1192–1194); Last sultan	Terken Khatun	Tāj ad-Dīn; İl-Arslan (r. 1156–1172)
Rukn ad-Dīn Suleyman II Shah of Rûm (r. 1196–1204)	The mothers of ʿIzz ad-Dīn; Kay Kāwus I and Jalāl ad-Dīn Kay Farīdûn	Ghiyāth ad-Dīn; Kay Khusraw I (r. 1192–1196) & (r. 1205–1211)	Dawlat Raziya Khatun	Malīka İsmetū'd-DīnGevher Nesibe Sultan	Qutbū'd-Dīn; Malīk Shāh (Sivas, Aksaray); Arslan Shāh (Niğde)	Terken Khatun de facto ruler of Muhammad	ʿAlāʾ ad-Dīn Takish (r. 1172–1200)	Jalāl ad-Dīn Sultān Shāh (r. 1172–1193)
Kilij Arslan III (r. 1204–1205)	ʿIzz ad-Dīn; Kay Kāwus I (r. 1211–1220)	Hunad-Māh Pari Khātun of Kir Fard of Alanya Castle	ʿAlāʾ ad-Dīn; Kay Qubād I (r. 1220–1237)	Malīka Ādīla Ghāzīya Khātun of Ayyubids	Muhyi'd-Dīn Masud Shāh (Ankara, Çankırı, Eskişehir)	Nurū'd-[Dīn Mahmud Sultān Shāh (Kayseri)	ʿAlāʾ ad-Dīn Muhammad (r. 1200–1220)	Jalāl al-Dīn Mangubardī (r. 1220–1231)
Jalāl ad-Dīn; Kay Farīdûn (Koyulhisar)	Sāhīp Shams ad-Dīn Īsfahānī (1246–1249) (Note: Grand Vizier Sāhīp Shams ad-Dīn Īsfahānī ruled the country on behalf of ʿIzz ad-Dīn Kay Kāwus II between 1246 and 1249)	Bardūlīya Khātun (Prodoulia)	Ghiyāth ad-Dīn; Kay Khusraw II (r. 1237–1246)	Gurju Khatun (Bagrationi dynasty of Georgians)	Mu'in ad-Dīn Suleyman (Note: Grand Vizier Parwāna Mu'in al-Din Suleyman ruled the country on behalf of Ghiyāth ad-Dīn Kay Khusraw III between 1266 and 2 August 1277 (1 Rabi' al-awwal 676)) (Parwāna)	ʿIzz ad-Dīn; Kilij Arslan, Rukn ad-Dīn and two daughters	Mugisū'd-Dīn Toghrul Shāh (Elbistan); Muizū'd-Dīn Kāysar Shāh (Malatya)	Ögedei established the Mongol rule in Khwarezmia (r. 1229–1241)
Karîm ad-Dīn Karaman Bey (r. 1256–1263) (Karamanoğulları; Anatolian Beylik)	Unknown son	ʿIzz ad-Dīn; Kay Kāwus II (1246–1249) (Note: Between 1246 and 1249 ʿIzz ad-Dīn Kay Kāwus II reigned alone) (r. 1249–1254) & (r. 1254–1262) (Note: ʿIzz ad-Dīn Kay Kāwus II was defeated on October 14, 1256 in Sultanhanı (Sultan Han, Aksaray) and he acceded to the throne on May 1, 1257 again after the departure of Baiju Noyan from Anatolia)	Rukn ad-Dīn; Kilij Arslan IV (r. 1249–1254) & (r. 1257–1262) & (1262–1266) (Note: Between 1262 and 1266 Rukn ad-Dīn Kilij Arslan IV reigned alone)	ʿAlāʾ ad-Dīn Kay Qubād II (Note: Between 1249 and 1254 triple reign of three brothers) (r. 1249–1254)	Pervâneoğulları Anatolian Beylik (established in Sinop in 1277)	Nizāmū'd-Dīn Argun Shāh (Amasya); Sanjar Shāh (Ereğli)	Nasirū'd-Dīn Barkyāruk Shāh (Niksar, Koyulhisar)	Möngke appointed Hulagu, the son of Tolui, as Il khan of the Mongol Empire in 1253
Karamanoğlu Shams ad-Dīn Mehmed Bey (Grand Vizier of ʿAlāʾ ad-Dīn Sīyāvuş)	ʿAlāʾ ad-Dīn Sīyāvuş (15 May 1277 - 20 June 1277) (Note: According to İbn Bîbî, el-Evâmirü'l-ʿAlâʾiyye, p. 727. (10 Dhu al-Hijjah 675 - 17 Muharram 676)) or (Note: According to Yazıcıoğlu Ali, Tevârih-i Âl-i Selçuk, p. 62. (10 Dhu al-Hijjah 677 - 17 Muharram 678)) (24 April 1279 - 30 May 1279)	Ghiyāth ad-Dīn Mas'ūd II (r. 1282–1284) & (r. 1284–1296)	Farāmurz	Ghiyāth ad-Dīn; Kay Khusraw III (r. 1266–1282) & (r. 1282–1284)	Mu'in ad-Dīn Mehmed (r. 1277–1297)	Mū'hazzab ūd-Dīn Ali	Kubilai endorsed Abaqa, the son of Hulagu, as Il-Khan in 1270 (r. 1265–1282)	Ahmad Tagüdar (r. 1282–1284)
Uç Beylik of Osman established	ʿAlāʾ ad-Dīn Kay Qubād III (r. 1298–1302)	Mū'hazzab ūd-Dīn Masūd (r. 1297–1300)	Taraqay	Arghun (r. 1284–1291)	Gaykhatu (r. 1291–1295)
Osman of Ottomans (r. 1299–1323/4)	Ghiyāth ad-Dīn Mas'ūd II (r. 1303–1308)	Gazi Chelebi (r. 1300–1322)	Baydu (r. 1295)	Ghazan (r. 1295–1304)	Öljaitü (r. 1304–1316)

Great Seljuk Turk sultans family tree

Tuqaq Temur; Yalig Beg (b. ? – d. ?); Commander-in-chief of The Oghuz army
Seljuk Beg (b. ? – d. ?); The founder of Seljuk dynasty
Qawam al-Dawla (r. 1012–1028); Buyid Governor in Kerman	Arslan Yabgu (b. ? – d. 1032); Chief of Seljuk dynasty	Mikail ibn Seljuk (b. ? -d. ?)	The mother of Toghrul, Chaghri, Ibrahim and Artash	Yûsuf Inal	Yûnus	Mûsâ Yabgu (İnanç Yabgu) Governor of Tokharistan
Abu Kalijar (r. 1028–1048); Buyid Amir in Kirman	Kurlu Bey (r. 1069–1071); Leader of the Seljuk vassal state in Palestine	Qutalmish; Father of the founder of Anatolian Seljuk Sultanate	1.Toghrul I (r. 1037–1063); First sultan of The Great Seljuk Empire	Chaghri Beg (r. 1040–1060); Governor of Khorasan	Ibrahim Inal	Artash Inal (Artāsh)	Abu Ali; Hasan Yabgu	Yûsuf, Kara Arslan, Abu Bakr, Umar, Bori and Dawlatshah
1.Qawurd-Beg; Seljuk Shah of Kirman (r. 1048–1073); Kerman Seljuk Sultanate	Atsiz ibn Uvaq (r. 1076–1079); Amir of Dimashq	Aksungur (r. 1086–1094); Sultan of Aleppo	2.Suleiman (r. 1063); Sultan of Great Seljuk	3.Alp Arslan (r. 1063–1072); Sultan of Great Seljuk	Alp Sungur Yâkūtî; Prince; Governor of Azerbaijan	Arslan Argun and Ilyas; Other princes	Khadija Arslan; Princess married Abbasid caliph Al-Qa'im.	Safiyya Khatun; Princess
2.Kerman Shah (r. 1073–1074); 3.Hussain Omar Shah (r. 1074)	Tutush (r. 1079–1095); Sultan of Dimashq and (r. 1094–1095) of Aleppo	Turkan Khatun; The daughter of Tamghach Khan; Ibrahim of Kara-Khanid dynasty and de facto ruler of Mahmud I	4.Malik-Shah I (r. 1072–1092); Sultan of Great Seljuk	Arslan-Shah (r. 1066–1083); Governor of Khorasan	Doğan-Shah (r. 1083–1092); Governor of Khorasan	Arslan-Argun (r. 1092–1097); Governor of Khorasan	Tuğrul and Böri-Bars; Other princes	Aisha; Princess married Kara-Khanid khan Nasr Shams al-Mulk.
4.Sultan Shah (r. 1074–1085); 5.Turan I Shah (r. 1085–1097)	Dawud and Ahmad; Other princes	5.Mahmud I (r. 1092–1094); Sultan of Great Seljuk	6.Bark-Yaruq (r. 1092–1104); Sultan of Great Seljuk	8.Muhammad I Tapar (r. 1105–1118); Sultan of Great Seljuk	9.Ahmad Sanjar (r. 1118–1153); Last sultan of The Great Seljuk	Tuğrul and Amîr Humâr; Other princes	Gawhar Khatun; Princess married Ghaznavid sultan Mas'ud III.	Sayyeda; Princess married Abbasid caliph Al-Mustazhir
6.Iranshah (r. 1097–1101); 7.Arslan I Shah (r. 1101–1142)	Duqaq (r. 1095–1104); Amir of Dimashq	Mah-i Malak; Princess married Abbasid caliph Al-Muqtadi	7.Malik-Shah II (r. 1104-1105); Sultan of Great Seljuk	1.Mahmud II (r. 1118–1131); First sultan of The Iraqi Seljuks	3.Toghrul II (r. 1132–1134); Sultan of Iraqi Seljuks	Mu'mine Khatun wife of Toghrul II until 1134 wife of İldeniz from 1136	Ildeniz (r. 1160–1175) de facto ruler Atabeg of Arslan-Shah	4.Masud (r. 1134–1152); Sultan of Iraqi Seljuks
8.Malīk Muhammad I Shah (r. 1142–1156); 9.Toghrul Shah (r. 1156–1170)	Tutush II & Artash (Baktāsh) (r. 1104); Amir of Dimashq	2.Dawud (r. 1131–1132); Sultan of Iraqi Seljuks	5.Malik-Shah III (r. 1152–1153); Sultan of Iraqi Seljuks	6.Muhammad II (r. 1153–1159); Sultan of Iraqi Seljuks	7.Suleiman-Shah (r. 1159–1160); Sultan of Iraqi Seljuks	8.Arslan-Shah (r. 1160–1177); Sultan of Iraqi Seljuks	Nusrat al-Din Muhammad (r. 1175–1186) de facto ruler of Toghrul III; Atabeg of Arslan-Shah	Qizil Arslan (r. 1186-1191) de facto ruler of Toghrul III; Atabeg of the Eldiguzids
10.Bahrām, 11.Arslan II; Shah(r. 1170 - 1171); 12.Bahrām Shah (r. 1171 - 1172)	13.Bahrām & Arslan II; Shah(r. 1172–1175); 14.Bahrām Shah (r. 1175)	15.Muhammad II Shah (r. 1175); 16.Arslan II Shah (r. 1175 - 1177)	17.Turan II Shah (r. 1177–1183); 18.Muhammad II Shah (r. 1183–1187)	Fakhr al-Mulk Radwan (r. 1095–1113); Malik of Aleppo	Alp Arslan (r. 1113–1114); Sultan Shah (r. 1114–1117)	9.Toghrul III (r. 1177–1191, 1192–1194); Last sultan of The Iraqi Seljuks	Nusrat al-Din Abu Bakr (r. 1191–1210) de facto ruler Atabeg of the Eldiguzids	Muzaffar al-Din Uzbek (r. 1210–1225); Atabeg of the Eldiguzids

Notes:

Family tree of the Shahs of Kerman

Duqaq Temur Beg
Seljuk Bey
Mikail Yabughu	Arslan Yabughu	Musa Yabghu	Yunus	Yusuf
Dawud Chaghri Bey	Tughril Bey; Sultan
Alp Arslan; Sultan	Qavurt; Shah of Kerman	Sulayman ibn Chaghri	Yaquti ibn Chaghri
Kerman Shah; Shah of Kerman	Sultan Shah; Shah of Kerman	Turan Shah I Shah of Kerman	Amirān-Shah	Mustazhiriyya; Daughter of Qavurt	Hüseyin Shah	Mardan Shah	Ömer Shah	Nuh	Dawud
Hussein Omar Shah; Shah of Kerman	Arslan Shah I Shah of Kerman	Iran Shah; Shah of Kerman	Son of Ghiyath ad-Din Mas'ud
Toghrul Shah	Muhammad I ibn Arslan; Shah of Kerman	Kerman Shah	Saljuk Shah
Toğrul Shah; Shah of Kerman	Mahd Rafi Khatun
Bahram Shah; Shah of Kerman	Arslan Shah II; Shah of Kerman	Turan Shah II; Shah of Kerman	Terken Shah
Muhammad-Shah II; Shah of Kerman	Yawlak ibn Arslan; Shah of Kerman

== Gallery ==
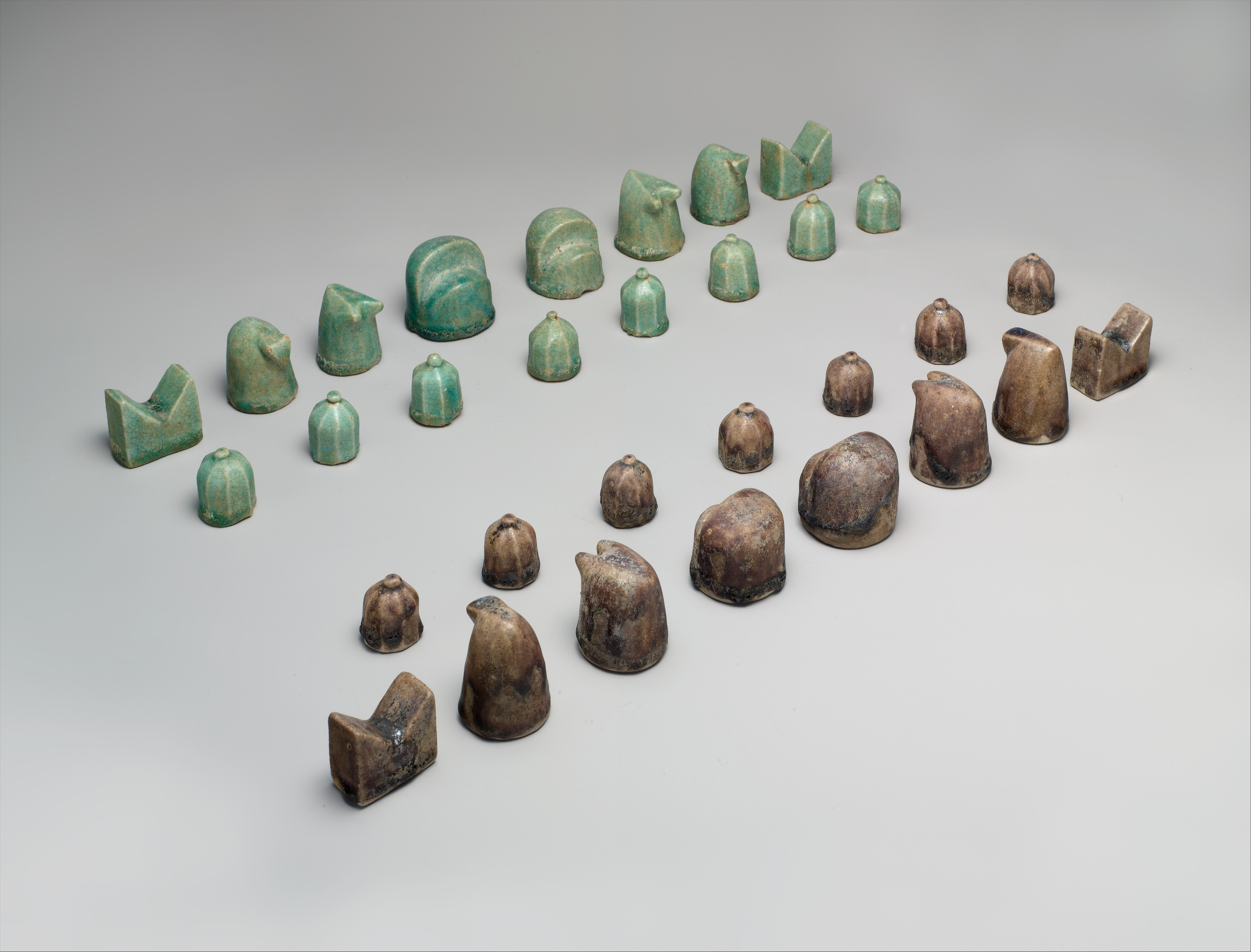
Shatranj chess set, glazed fritware, 12th-century Iran. New York Metropolitan Museum of Art.

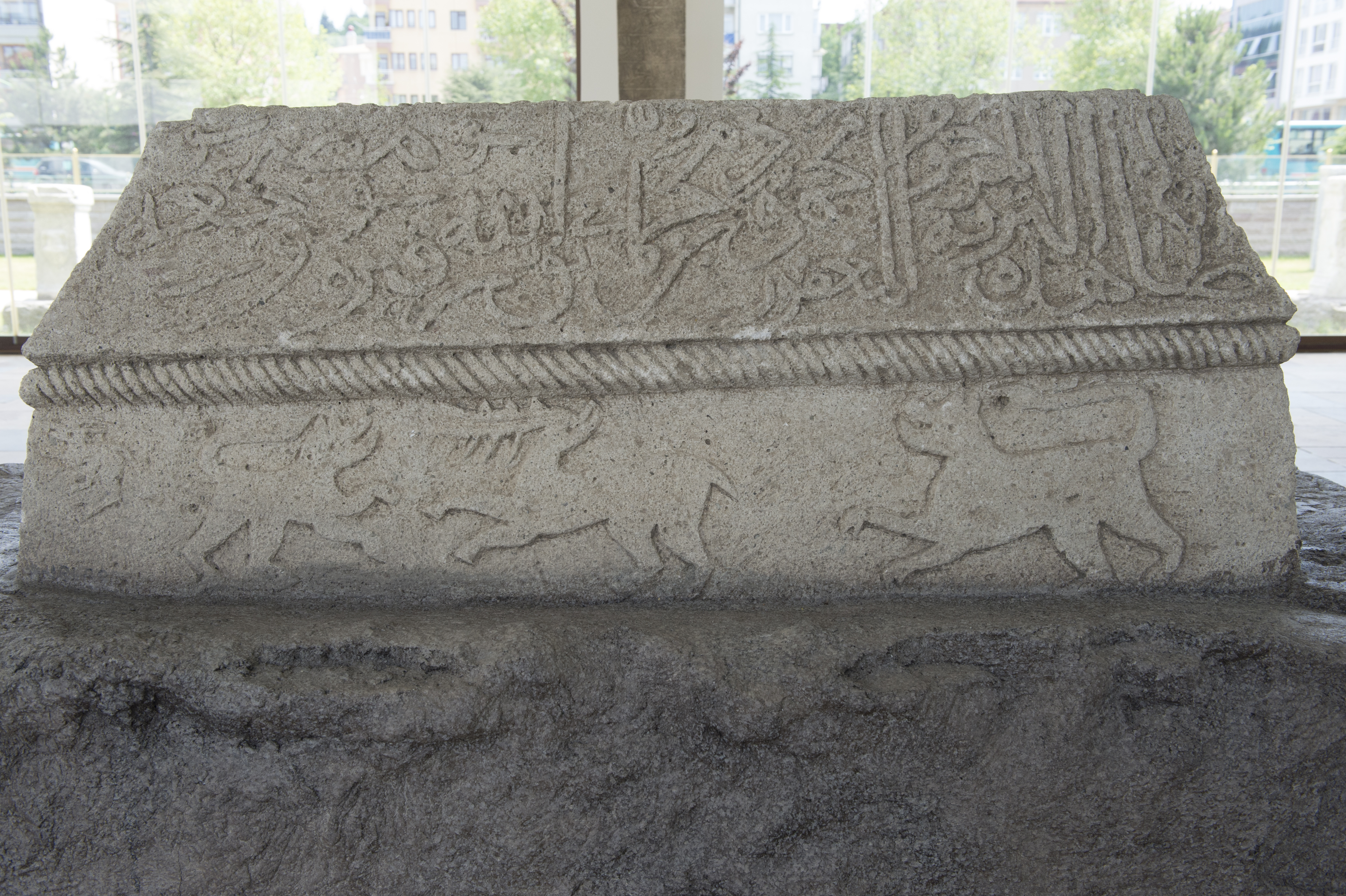
Seljuk sarcophagus at the Eskişehir Eti Archaeology Museum

== See also ==
- Khatun Seljuk princess
- Seljuk Empire
- Seljuk Sultanate of Rum
- Seljuk (warlord)
