= Kubadoğulları Beylik =

Anatolian Beylik based around Samsun

Beylik of the Qubadids Turkish: Kubadoğulları Beyliği
- 1308–1422
- Map of the Qubadid Beylik (shown in magenta), with Samsun and Ladik under its control.
- Status: Ilkhanid vassal (1308 - 1318); Kutlushah vassal (ca. 1357); Ottoman vassal (1398 - 1402, ca. 1414); Independent (1318 - 1357, 1402 - 1419, ca. 1422); Disestablished (1419 - 1422)
- Capital: Samsun (1308 - 1318, 1398 - 1405, ca. 1414, ca. 1422); Ladik (ca. 1357)
- Common languages: Old Anatolian Turkish
- Religion: Sunni Islam
- Government: Beylik, Emirate
- Bey, Emir
  - 1308 - 1357: Tâcüddîn Altunbaş
  - 1357 - ?: Keykubad Bey
  - ? - 1403: Ali Bey
  - 1403 - 1419: Cüneyd Bey
  - ca. 1422: Hüseyin Bey
- Historical era: Middle Ages
  - Established: 1308
  - Conflict with Ilkhanids: 1318
  - Bayezid I's Campaign: 1398
  - Conflict with Mehmed Çelebi: 1403
  - Death of Cüneyd Bey: 1414
  - Disestablished: 1422
Preceded by	Succeeded by
Sultanate of Rum	Ottoman Empire
- Today part of: Turkey

The Kubadoğulları Beylik (Turkish: Kubadoğulları Beyliği), also known as the Altunbaşoğulları (Turkish: Altunbaşoğulları Beyliği) was an Anatolian beylik established around Samsun, Ladik and Kavak following the collapse of the Sultanate of Rum in 1308 Considered to be among the Beyliks of Canik, Kubadoğulları, frequently clashed with the Ottoman Empire over the control of Samsun.

== History ==
=== Reign of Tâçeddin Altunbaş ===
The Kubadoğulları Beylik was founded by Tâçeddin Altunbaş, the son of Sultan Mesud II of Rum and the grandson of Izzeddin Keykavus II. Altunbaş, though belonging to a royal dynasty, ruled as a vassal to the Ilkhanate in lands given to him after the death of Mesud II in 1308. Altunbaş controlled lands which included Samsun, Ladik, Kavak as well as Amasya. Until 1318, Altunbaş remained loyal to the Ilkhanids. In 1318, Altunbaş's atabeg, Emir Yeshbek, was killed in Amasya during a conflict with the Mongols. Taceddin Altunbaş hid during this incident and reappeared in the region north of Amasya, beginning to rule independently. There is no information about his reign, even the exact time of his death is unknown, it is dated from the 1340s to 1350s, though some suggest it to be 1357.

Tomb of Tâçeddin Altunbas in Amasya

His tomb was later discovered in the village of Umurbey, also known as Sheikh Safi, in Simre-i Havza, a subordinate district of Amasya. It is also claimed that Tâçeddin was known by names such as Gazi Çelebi, Küçük Gazi and Sultan Gazi.

=== Reign of Keykubad Bey ===
Altunbaş was succeeded by his son Keykubad Bey after his death Keykubad remained in Ladik and ruled his father's territories, while Keykubad's lala, Emir Taşan, founded a beylik in the region consisting of Merzifon, Havza, and Köprü The capital of the Kubadoğulları under Keykubad was Ladik.

=== Reign of Kubadoğlu Ali Bey ===
After Keykubad Bey, his son Kubadoğlu Ali Bey, who became emir, became subject to the Kutlushahs —the ruler of Amasya, Hacı Şâdgeldi Bey, and his successor, Fahrüddîn Ahmed Bey. Haji Şadgeldi sent Kubadoglu Ali Bey, against the ruler of the neighboring beylik to the east, Taçeddin Bey. After a successful expedition, Ali Bey received control of Samsun, which he had captured, and gave the city to his son, Kubadoğlu Çüneyd Bey. Ali fought the most against Taçeddin. He was the first of the family who was known as Kubadoğlu.

In 1392–1393, Ottoman Sultan Bayezid I campaigned into northern Anatolia, defeating and killing the Candarid ruler Süleyman Pasha II to annex Kastamonu and extend Ottoman suzerainty over Samsun (which was under Candar influence) and the neighboring Canik principalities.

Around the end of the 14th century, Sultan Bayezid set out to conquer the Canik region. In his first expedition in 1396, he occupied Bafra but left Samsun alone. Kubadoğlu Çüneyd Bey held Samsun until the spring of 1398. The city was then taken by the Ottomans, who allowed Çüneyd to remain in the area as an Ottoman vassal.

However, several accounts say that Çüneyd Bey fled Samsun during Bayezid's campaign in 1398. Bayezid captured Samsun and placed Alexander, son of the Bulgarian tsar Ivan Shishman as governor.

After Bayezid's defeat in 1402 at the Battle of Ankara, the Kubadoğulları returned to power in Samsun, taking advantage of the weakness of the Ottoman Empire, which had entered the interregnum (1402–1413). Kubadoğlu Ali Bey refused to recognize the authority of Mehmed Çelebi, who had declared his rule in Amasya by Timur's appointment. He marched against the Tâceddinoğulları and besieged their capital Niksar, which was also under the protection of Mehmed ÇelebiThereupon in early 1403, Mehmed arrived from Amasya and defeated Ali Bey, who then took refuge with his neighbor, Taşanoğlu, whose capital was Merzifon. In response, Mehmed besieged a castle loyal to Taşanoğlu (Felenbol or Filtil) in the Canik region With the death of Ali Bey in 1403, Mehmed appointed Taşanoğlu Ahmed Bey as the sanjakbey of Samsun (1405), while Çüneyd Bey succeeded him as the Kubadoğulları emir.

=== Reign of Kubadoğlu Çüneyd Bey ===
After the death of Kubadoğlu Ali Bey, his son Çüneyd Bey assumed control of the beylik. Although Çüneyd Bey lost Samsun, he did not abandon his claim to power in the region. In 1414, he attacked Taşanoğlu Ahmed Bey, killed him, and recaptured Samsun and its surroundings. Later, Çüneyd asked the Ottoman Sultan for forgiveness and remained in Muslim Samsun as the sanjakbey of the Ottomans. However, his reign did not last long. Hasan Tâçeddinoglu, in alliance with Hızır Bey, son of Kötürüm Bayezid, defeated him and captured the city.

Ottoman historian Mehmed Neşri states in his work, "Then Hasan Bey, the son of Alp Arslan (Tâçeddin Bey), killed Çüneyd Bey and captured Canik". However, Hasan held Samsun only for a short time, since the ruler of the neighboring beylik of Candarıoğulları, Mubariz al-Din Isfendiyar, almost immediately captured Samsun and Bafra, which he placed under the control of his son Hızır. In 1419, when the Anatolian beylerbey, Biçeroğlu Hamza Bey, besieged Samsun Castle, it was already in the hands of Hızır. In 1420, Hızır handed over the Samsun Fortress personally to Mehmed, thus ensuring the fall of Samsun to the Ottomans.

During the reign of Cüneyd Bey, the beylik of Kubadoğulları reached its greatest extent, including Samsun and Bafra. However, after his death, the state ceased to exist. The Kubadoğulları did not remain in their lands and migrated to the Caucasus, possibly with the help of Greeks from the Empire of Trebizond.

=== Reign of Kubadoğlu Hüseyin Bey ===
After the death of Mehmed Çelebi, his son Murad II succeeded him as Ottoman Sultan. However, the early years of his were not stable due to subsequent rebellions of his uncle Mustafa Çelebi and his younger brother Küçük Mustafa. Taking advantage of the ensuing chaos, Kubadoğlu Hüseyin Bey, the son of Kubadoğlu Çüneyd Bey seized Samsun in 1422. However, Ottomans sent Lala Yörgüç Pasha to Amasya to reassert authority in the region. Therefore, Hüseyin Bey personally went to Amasya and surrendered Samsun to the Ottomans.

Hence, the ruling class of the Kubadoğulları, ended after this event. The rule of the Seljuk dynasty however continued through the lineage of Ghias ad-Din and David VI Narin in Georgia.

== Dynasty ==
Family tree of Kubadoğulları

Izzeddin Keykavus II
Mesud II	Rukn al-Dīn Kayūmarth	Constantine Melik	Farāmarz	Siyāwush
Mesud III	Tâçeddin Altunbaş; Bey
Kilij Arslan	Keykubad; Bey	Malik-Shah	Kaykhosrow	Ibrahim
Kubadoğlu Ali; Bey	Kilij Arslan
Kubadoğlu Çüneyd; Bey
Kubadoğlu Hüseyin; Bey

== See also ==
- Sultanate of Rum
- Seljuk dynasty
- Beylik of Lâdik
- Anatolian beyliks
- Eretnid dynasty
