= Dukak =

Dukak or Duqaq may refer to:

- Tuqaq (died c. 924 AD), founder of the Seljuq dynasty
- Shams al-Muluk Duqaq (died 1104), Seljuq ruler of Damascus 1095–1104
