= Battle of Ganja (1046) =

Battle of the Byzantine–Seljuq wars

- Part of the Byzantine–Seljuq wars and Georgian–Seljuk wars
| Date | 1046 |
| Location | Near Ganja |
| Result | Seljuk victory |

Belligerents
| Byzantine Empire; Duchy of Kldekari | Seljuk Empire |

Commanders and leaders
| Liparit | Tughril Beg; Qutalmish; Ibrahim Yinal |

The Battle of Ganja occurred in 1046 when a Byzantine army sent to the Caucasus by the Emperor Constantine IX under the command of Liparit fought against the Seljuk army commanded by Qutalmish.

The Byzantine Emperor Constantine IX sent an army to the Caucasus commanded by the Georgian Duke of Kldekari Liparit IV aiming to protect his borders and stop the Seljuk raids that had been destabilising the region. In response Tughril Bey dispatched an army that was led by Qutalmish.

The Byzantine army advanced towards Divin under the command of Liparit. The two armies met in front of the Ganja city walls in 1046 where the Byzantines were then severely defeated by the Seljuks.
