= Tamar (daughter of Rusudan of Georgia) =

Tamar (Gurju Khatun)
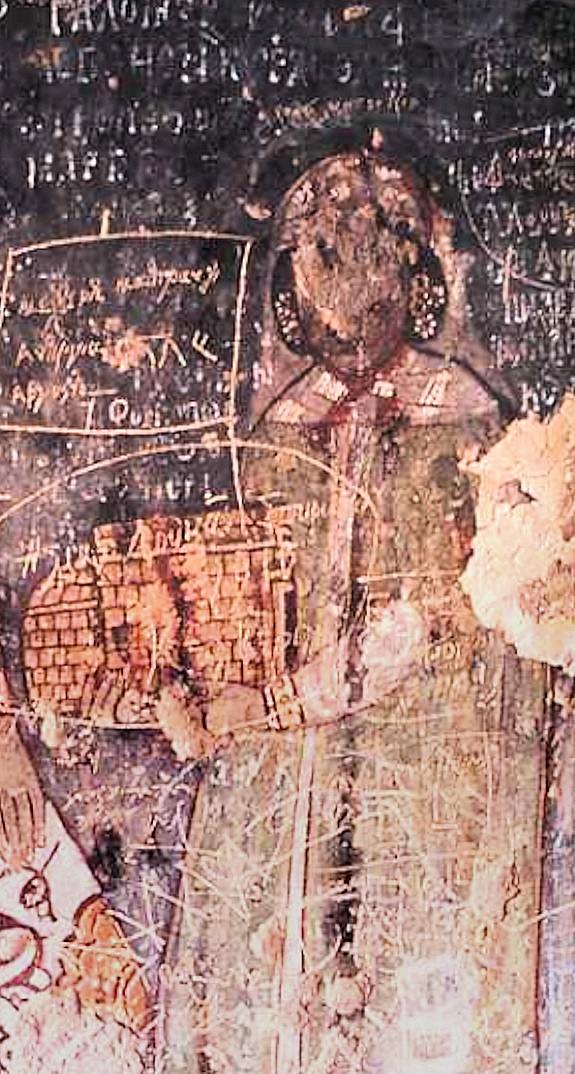
- Likely depiction of Tamar, Kırkdamaltı Kilisesi.

Consort of the Sultan of Rum
- Tenure: 1237–1246
- Born: c. 1224; Kingdom of Georgia
- Died: c. 1286
- Spouse: Kaykhusraw II; Mu'in al-Din Parwana
- Issue: Kayqubad II; Aynu'l-Hayat Khatun
- Dynasty: Seljuk‐Bagrationi (by birth); Seljuk (by marriage)
- Father: Ghias ad-Din
- Mother: Rusudan of Georgia
- Religion: Georgian Orthodox Church, later Islam Sufism

Tamar (Georgian: თამარი, romanized: tamari), also known as Gurju Khatun (Georgian: გურჯი-ხათუნი, romanized: gurji-khatuni; also Gürgü Hatun), was the daughter of Rusudan of Georgia and the Seljuk prince Ghias ad-Din Turkanshah. She was a royal princess of the Bagrationi dynasty and principal consort of the Sultanate of Rum as the favorite wife of sultan Kaykhusraw II, whom she married in 1237, after the death of Muhammad II of Khwarazm. After his death in 1246 she married the Anatolian strongman Mu'in al-Din Parwana. She was the mother of sultan Kayqubad II and patron to Rumi.

Her title Gurju Khatun means "Georgian Lady" in Turkic languages.

== Biography ==
Tamar was born to the Georgian Queen Rusudan and the Seljuk prince Ghias ad-Din, son of the ruler of Erzurum, Tughril Shah. Their marriage took place c. 1223, and Ghias ad-Din had been baptized at Rusudan's request, an unprecedented event in the history of the Near East. Named after her grandmother, Queen Tamar I, she was described in the Georgian chronicles as being of sublime beauty. Tamar had a younger brother, David. Rusudan was also raising Tamar's cousin, also named David, the illegitimate son of King George IV, who was next in the line of succession and, despite his illegitimacy, was preferred by some nobles.

The raids conducted by Kayqubad I, the Seljuk sultan of Rum, into Georgian lands alarmed the Georgian queen Rusudan, who sent a letter to the sultan. Among other matters, she offered her daughter Tamar — "of the line of the Seljuks, of the line of David" — in marriage to Kayqubad's son, Kaykhusraw. An agreement was reached, but the wedding took place only after the sultan's death. The vizier Shehabeddin Kermani traveled to Tbilisi bearing gifts, and once preparations were completed, the bridal procession departed for Konya.

Upon reaching Erzincan, Shehabeddin informed the groom, now the reigning sultan, and preparations began in Kayseri. When the bride arrived, a magnificent wedding ceremony was held. This occurred in 1237, when Tamar was about thirteen years old. According to the Centennial Chronicle (Anonymous Chronicle of the 14th century, part of the Kartlis Tskhovreba), Rusudan granted her the city of Atskuri, including its church and fortress, as her dowry.

Kaykhusraw and Tamar's marriage was a political one. Nevertheless, Tamar became his favored wife and bore the prestigious title Malikat al-Malikat ("Queen of Queens"). Among the Turks she was known as Gurju Khatun ("the Georgian Lady"). She spent most of her life in Kayseri.

According to Tamara Talbot Rice, Tamar exerted considerable influence over her husband. Kaykhusraw who was much affectionate to her minted coins depicting himself as a lion and Tamar as a rising sun with a woman's face.

Rusudan married off her daughter on the condition that Tamar would not be compelled to accept Islam, and Kaykhusraw agreed to this promise. Tamar "came from her country wearing Christian garments, accompanied by a catholicos, holy men, and priests of the Church," as well as Georgian attendants. Her cousin David traveled with her as well.

According to the Centennial Chronicle, Rusudan later wrote to her son-in-law Kaykhusraw and to her daughter, urging them to kill David. When Kaykhusraw and Tamar refused after two such appeals, Rusudan "forgot both faith and compassion toward her kin, and even the love of a mother," and, sparing no one, falsely accused her daughter. She wrote to the sultan claiming that "David has committed adultery with your wife, my daughter." Enraged, the sultan beat Tamar and smashed the icons in her chambers, then forced her to accept Islam and imprisoned David.However,the Sultan beating his beloved wife Tamar(Gurji)seems like a big accusation and defmaing tactics by Gurji's mother as Kaykhusraw II was supposedly infatuated by Tamar.

Historian Speros Vryonis considered the credibility of this narrative doubtful. According to Bar Hebraeus, Tamar accepted Islam some time after the marriage, while her companions — "her cousin David and the catholicos" — were arrested and confined in a citadel; they were freed only upon the arrival of the Mongols. Claude Cahen attributed David's imprisonment to Rusudan's political intrigues, arguing that she sought to eliminate her nephew in order to secure the throne for her own son.

Gurji Khatun was drawn to Islam and chose to convert to Sufism as she was a close follower of the Perian poet Rumi.Kaykhusraw II may have let her choose which denomination of Islam she wanted to convert to. Hence, Gurju Khatun chose Sufism. It is said that the sun on the Seljuk coins of that time symbolizes Tamar, while the lion stands for the sultan himself. This emblem, known as shir-u hurshid (Lion and Sun), later became widespread in the Islamic world (though its origins date back to much earlier times). After the death of Kaykhusraw in 1246, the government of the sultanate was seized by the Mu'in al-Din Parwana who married Gurju Khatun.The marriage between Mu'in al-Din Parwana and Gurji Khatun seems to be an entirely political arrangement or maybe a compromise or as per the time,a forced marriage on the queen.

She is known to have patronized science and art, and to have been on friendly terms with the famous Sufi poet Rumi in particular. She also sponsored the construction of the poet's tomb in Konya. She died in 1286 at age 65-66 and is buried in Erzurum Kalesi in modern-day Turkey. Her tomb has been recently discovered as reported by Georgian Ambassador Plenipotentiary as in 2019.

== Marriages ==
Following a diplomatic peace settlement between the Kingdom of Georgia and the Sultanate of Rum, the approximately 13-year-old princess Tamar arrived at the Seljuk court in Konya in 1237 to wed Sultan Kaykhusraw II. Upon her marriage, she converted to Islam and adopted the name Gurju Khatun (meaning "Georgian Lady"). Despite the marriage being a political one, she rapidly emerged as Kaykhusraw II's favorite consort and was elevated to the premier status of Malikat al-Malikat (Queen of Queens). Her profound domestic and political influence during this marriage is highlighted by numismatic evidence; the Sultan famously insisted on striking her likeness onto Seljuk coins, resulting in the iconic "Lion and Sun" (shir-o-khurshid) motif depicted on the state's silver dirhams. Throughout her initial marriage, Gurju Khatun operated as a central pillar of the royal household and a key diplomatic link to the Caucasus, a position solidified by her bearing the Sultan's favored youngest son and eventual successor, Ala al-Din Kayqubad II. and a daughter.

Following Kaykhusraw II's death in 1246 and the subsequent execution of her son, Gurju Khatun's position at court destabilized, culminating in a secondary political marriage to the powerful Seljuk grand vizier and regent, Mu'in al-Din Suleyman Parwana. Unlike her first union, contemporary accounts portray this second marriage as a deeply unhappy, forced domestic arrangement. According to the 14th-century chronicler Ahmed Eflâkî, the Parwana's strict, orthodox religious disposition clashed severely with Gurju Khatun's independent wealth and her profound devotion to the unorthodox, mystic Sufi circles of Jalal al-Din Rumi. Eflâkî details numerous instances of bitter marital strife, recording that the Parwana routinely grew jealous of her absolute reverence for Rumi and tried to restrict her financial patronage of the Mevlevi order, though she successfully used her residual royal status to resist his domestic control until his execution by the Mongols in 1277.

== Issue ==
The marriage between Gurju Khatun and Sultan Kaykhusraw II produced two children:

- Ala al-Din Kayqubad II, who later ruled as a triumvirate Sultan of the divided Seljuk realm.
- Aynu'l-Hayat Khatun: A prominent princess frequently identified in medieval Sufi biographies by her honorific court titles, Hundi Khatun or Havendzâde.

According to contemporary accounts by the 14th-century biographer Ahmed Eflâkî in his Menâkıbü'l-Ârifîn, Aynu'l-Hayat Khatun closely mirrored her mother’s famous spiritual devotion to the Mevlevi Sufi order. Following the political upheaval and Mongol invasions that disrupted invasions that disrupted central Anatolia in 1277, Gurju Khatun arranged for Aynu'l-Hayat to be relocated safely eastward to Erzurum—a region tied to the ancestral lands of her paternal family line. Settled in Erzurum, Aynu'l-Hayat Khatun utilized her independent royal status and wealth to operate as an elite institutional patron, funding and sustaining the local Mevlevi dervish networks and maintaining direct ties with Rumi's grandson, Ulu Arif Çelebi.

== Bibliography ==
- Badamo, Heather A. (2023). Saint George between empires: image and encounter in the medieval East. University Park, Pennsylvania: The Pennsylvania State University Press. ISBN 978-0-271-09522-6.
- Budge, Ernest A. Wallis, ed. (1932). The Chronography of Gregory Abû'l Faraj, the Son of Aaron, the Hebrew Physician, Commonly known as Bar Hebraeus. Vol. 1. London: Oxford University Press.
- Cahen, Claude (1968). Pre-Ottoman Turkey: A General Survey of the Material and Spiritual Culture and History c. 1071–1330. New York: Sidgwick & Jackson. p. 492. ISBN 978-0-283-35254-6.
- Çayırdağ, M. (2010). "Gürcü Hatun". Kayseri Ansiklopedisi (in Turkish). Vol. 2. pp. 446–448.
- Gordlevsky, Vladimir Alexandrovich (1960). I. Yu. Krachkovsky (ed.). Государство Сельджукидов Малой Азии [The Seljuk Empire of Asia Minor]. Selected Works (in Russian). Vol. 1: Historical Works. Мoscow: Publishing House of Eastern Literature.
- Kapanşahin, M.; Duman, K. (2023). "Anadolu Selçuklu Devleti'nde Rum Kökenli Melikeler" [Melikes of Rum Origin in the Anatolian Seljuk State]. Journal of Turkic World Women Studies (in Turkish). 2 (1): 1–19. doi:10.5281/zenodo.7764630.
- Rice, Tamara Talbot (1966). The Seljuks in Asia Minor. Thames and Hudson.
- Shukurov, R. M. (2011). S. P. Karpov (ed.). Harem Christianity: The Byzantine Identity of the Anatolian Seljuks Гаремное христианство: византийская идентичность анатолийских Сельджуков. Black Sea Region in the Middle Ages (in Russian). Vol. 8. Saint Petersburg: Aleteiya. pp. 64–90.
- Turan, O. (1953), "Les souverains seldjoukides et leurs sujets non-musulmans", Studia Islamica, 1: 65–100, doi:10.2307/1595010, ISSN 0585-5292, JSTOR 1595010
- Vryonis, Speros (1977). Another Note on the Inscription of the Church of St. George of Beliserama. Vol. 9. Βυζαντινά. pp. 11–22.
- Kartlis Tskhovreba (in Russian). Artanuji Publishing. 2008. p. 484.
- Shukurov, Rustam (2016). The Byzantine Turks (1204–1461). Leiden: Brill. ISBN 978-90-04-30512-0.
- Gamq’relidze, Dmitri (2014). The Georgian Chronicles of KARTLIS TSKHOVREBA (A History of Georgia). Tbilisi: ARTANUJI Publishing.
- Rayfield, Donald (2012). Edge of Empires, a History of Georgia. London: Reaktion Books. ISBN 978-1-78023-070-2.
