= Malik-Shah III =

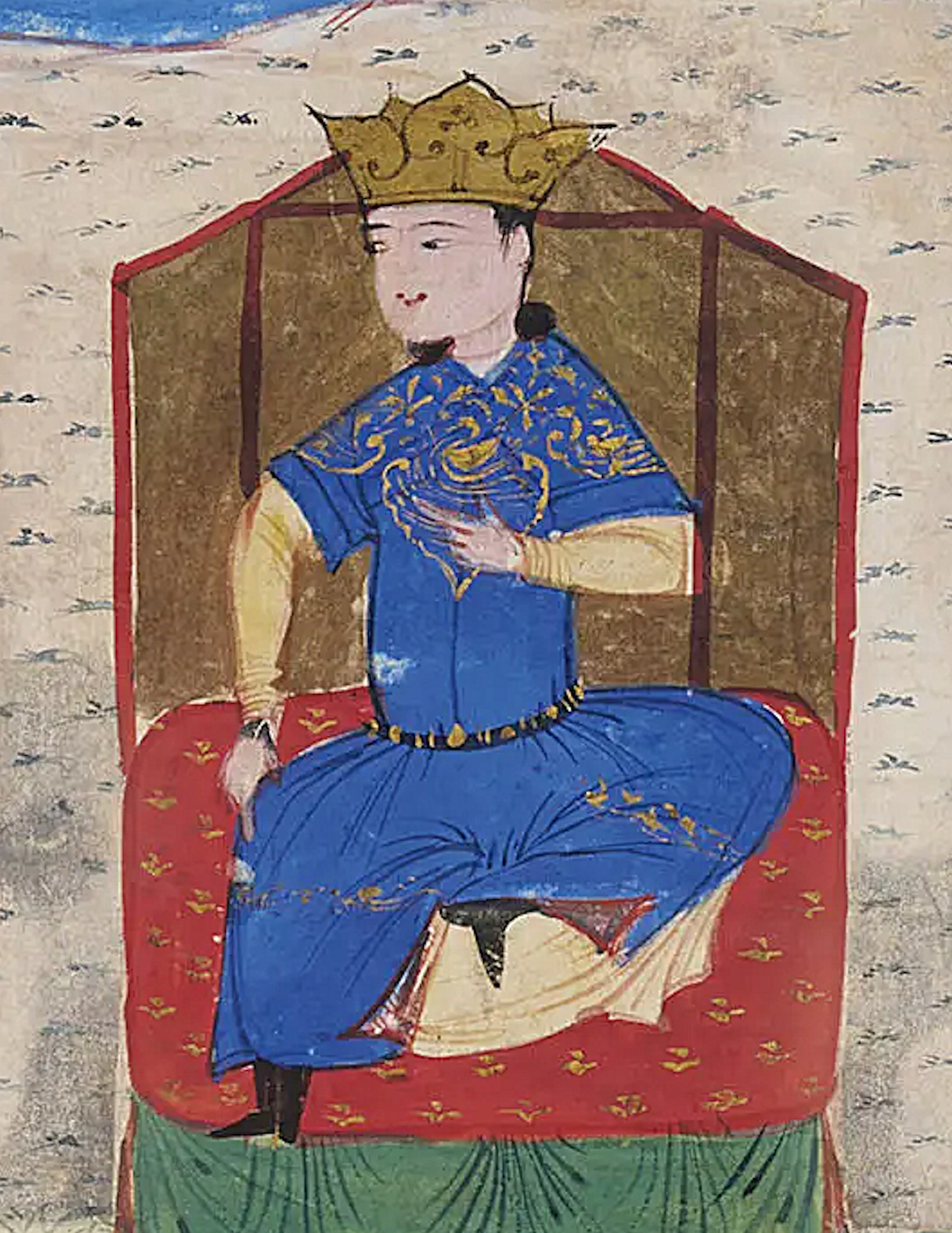
- Miniature of Malik-Shah III, c. 1425

Sultan of the Seljuq Empire
- Reign: 10 October 1152 – April 1153
- Predecessor: Mas'ud
- Successor: Muhammad II
- Co-sultan: Ahmad Sanjar (1152–1153)
- Born: c. 1128
- Died: 25 March 1160
- Spouse: Daughter of Mas'ud
- Issue: Mahmud
- House: House of Seljuq
- Father: Mahmud II
- Mother: Amir Sitti Khatun
- Religion: Sunni Islam

Mughith al-Dunya wa'l-Din Malik-Shah bin Mahmud (c. 1128 – 25 March 1160) known as Malik-Shah III ruled as Sultan of Great Seljuq from 1152–53. He was the son of Mahmud II of Great Seljuq. In 1153, he was deposed and was succeeded by his brother, Muhammad. Following his death in 1160, his son Mahmud was held in Istakhr by the Salghurids as a rival claimant to the Seljuq throne.

== Reign ==
Malik-Shah ascended the throne on 10 October 1152. After a fortnight, Malik-Shah ingeniously descended a waterspout with a rope, escaping to Khuzistan on a well-prepared horse arranged through a page. Simultaneously, his supportive sister, Gawhar Nasab, journeyed from Isfahan to Khuzistan, carrying ample gold and regal items for her brother. Sultan Muhammad, learning of this, dispatched Atabeg Ayaz and an army, leading to the capture and looting of the conveyed wealth. Malik-Shah lacked the strength to engage in direct conflict with his brother.

Malik-Shah then called Khass Beg for a private meeting with the intention of harming him. Accompanied by Amir Zangi and Shumla, they came to him. Despite Shumla's warning, Khass Beg proceeded. Shumla escaped, while both Zangi and Khass Beg were beheaded, their bodies thrown into the square. Following the Vizier's counsel, the Sultan sent their heads to rulers Shams al-Din Ildiguz and Nugrat al-Din Khass Beg bin Aqsunqur. This plan backfired, sparking rebellion. They assembled an army, brought Suleiman-Shah from Zanjan, and appointed him as the ruler in Hamadan.

In December 1152–January 1153 due to his excessive focus on pleasure and disregard for state affairs, amirs, led by Hasan, conspired against him, resulting in his arrest and imprisonment in a Hamadan tower. After just few months of rule, his brother, Muhammad Shah, from Khuzistan, took over the throne in April 1153. Taking refuge in Isfahan, Malik-Shah's presence distressed his uncle Suleiman-Shah.

== Death ==
He died at Isfahan on 25 March 1160 at the age of thirty-two. He was poisoned.

== Sources ==
- al-Athīr, I.D.I.; Richards, D.S. (2006). The Chronicle of Ibn Al-Athīr for the Crusading Period from Al-Kāmil Fīʼl-taʼrīkh: The years 541-589. Crusade texts in translation. Ashgate. ISBN 978-0-7546-4078-3.
- Bosworth, E. (2000). The History of the Seljuq Turks: The Saljuq-nama of Zahir al-Din Nishpuri. Taylor & Francis. ISBN 978-1-136-75257-5.
