= Qutalmish =

Seljuk prince

- Known for: Ancestor of the Seljuq sultans of Rum
- Predecessor: Arslan Yabgu
- Successor: Suleiman ibn Qutalmish
- Father: Arslan Yabgu
- Family: House of Seljuq

Qutalmish ibn Arslan Isra'il (Turkish: Kutalmış Bey, Old Anatolian Turkish: قوتالمش بگ, Persian: قتلمش) (alternative spellings: Qutalmis, Kutalmish, Kutalmış) was a Turkic prince who was a member of Seljukid house in the 11th century. His son Kutalmışoğlu Suleiman, founded the Sultanate of Rum in Anatolia.

== Sultanate of Rûm ==
Kutalmish was the son of Arslan Yabgu and a cousin of Tughril and played a vital role in the conquests of the Seljuk Turks. In 1046, he was sent with an army by Tughril to force back the Byzantine army at Ganja and was victorious. (see Battle of Ganja (1046))

He supported a rebellion against Tughril and contested the succession to the throne with Alp Arslan. (see Battle of Damghan (1063)) According to the historian Ali ibn al-Athir, Kutalmish knew the sciences of the stars. He had five sons, among them Mansur and Suleiman, who was recognized as Sultan of Rûm by Malik Shah I in 1084.

== Name ==
"Kut Almış" means "he that has received fortune (majesty)".

== Sources ==
- Ihsanoglu, Ekmeleddin (2005). "Institutionalisation of Science in the Medreses of pre-Ottoman and Ottoman Turkey". In Irzik, Gürol; Güzeldere, Güven (eds.). Turkish Studies in the History and Philosophy of Science. Springer.
- Juvaynī, ʻAlāʼ al-Dīn ʻAṭā Malik; Boyle, John Andrew (1958). The History of the World-conqueror. Vol. 1. p. 45.
- Köprülü, Mehmed Fuad (1992). The Seljuks of Anatolia: their history and culture according to local Muslim sources. University of Utah Press.
- Sicker, Martin (2000). The Islamic World in Ascendancy: From the Arab Conquests to the Siege of Vienna. Greenwood Publishing.

Political offices
Preceded by Arslan Yabgu	Seljuk Prince	Succeeded by Süleyman
