= Kayqubad III =

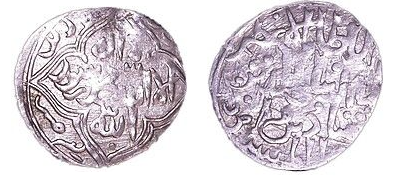
- Rare dirham of Kayqubad III minted in Ladik (nowadays Denizli).

Seljuq sultan of Rum
- Reign: 1298–1301/2
- Predecessor: Mesud II
- Successor: Mesud II
- Born: c. 1283
- Died: 1302
- Issue: Mesud III; Kilij Arslan V Gawhari Naima Khatun
Names
- ʿAlāʾ ad-Dīn Kayqubād bin Farāmurz
- House: House of Seljuq

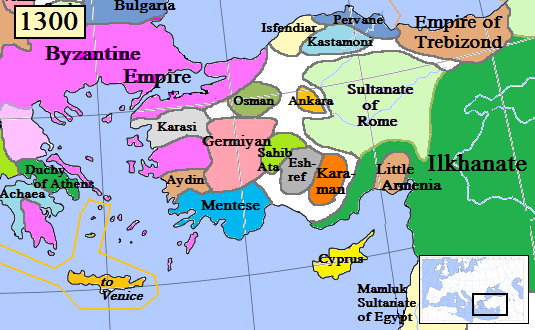
Map of Anatolia, 1300 CE. Kayqubad III ruled over the light green section.

Kayqubad III (Old Anatolian Turkish: كَیقُباد سوم or ʿAlāʾ ad-Dīn Kayqubād bin Farāmurz; Persian: علاء الدین کیقباد بن فرامرز) was briefly sultan of the Sultanate of Rum between the years of 1298 and 1302. He was a nephew of the deposed Mesud II and had strong support among the Seljuk Turks. As sultan he was a vassal of the Mongols and exercised no real power.

== Reign ==
He first appears circa 1283 as a pretender to the Seljuk throne. He was recognized by the Turkish Karamanids, but he was defeated by vizier Fakhr al-Din Ali and Kaykhusraw III and sought refuge in Cilician Armenia. Nothing is known of his movements again until 1298, when he was appointed to the sultanate by the Ilkhan Mahmud Ghazan upon the downfall of Masud II. He purged the Seljuq administration of his predecessor’s men with extreme violence and became deeply unpopular; as a result when he visited the Ilkhan in 1302, he was executed and replaced with his predecessor Mesud II in order to keep the peace.

=== Participation in the Siege of Karacahisar ===
Seljuk Sultan Alâeddin Kayqubad III is said to have given Osman the title Ḥaḍrat ʻUthmān ghāzī marzubān 'âli jâh ʻUthmān Shāh (the honourable conqueror and border guardian Osman Shah) for inciting a holy war against the Byzantine tekfurs, as in Karacahisar. Further, he also bestowed upon Osman the governance of all the land he had conquered as well as the towns of Eskişehir and İnönü and exempting Osman from all types of taxes. Finally, Osman also received several traditional gifts reflecting the new high stature to the Seljuk court, including a golden war banner, a Mehter (war drum), a Tuğ (a pole with circularly arranged horse tail hairs), a tassel, a gilded sword, a loose saddle, and one hundred thousand Dirhams. The decree also included the recognition of Osman's right to be mentioned in the Friday khuṭbah in all lands subject to him, and was permitted to mint coins in his name, making him essentially a sultan, only lacking the title.

It is told that when drums were beaten announcing Sultan Kayqubad's arrival, Osman stood up in glorification, and remained so till the march music halted. Since that day, Ottoman soldiers enacted standing in glorification for their Sultan whenever drums were beaten.

== Sources ==
Preceded by Mesud II	Sultan of Rûm; 1298–1301/2	Succeeded by Mesud II
