= Kaykhusraw II =

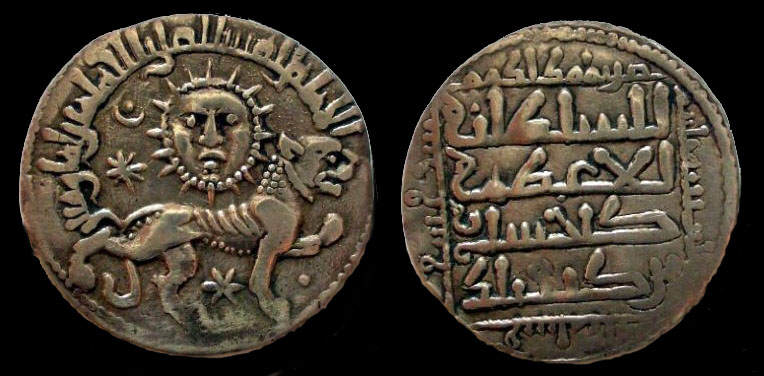
- Dirham coin of Kaykhusraw II, Sivas, AH 638/AD 1240-1.

Sultan of Rum
- Reign: 1237–1246
- Predecessor: Kayqubad I
- Successor: Kaykaus II
- Born: 1215
- Died: 1246 (aged 30–31)
- Consort: Tamar (Gurju Khatun); Prodoulia
- Issue: Izz al-Din Kaykaus II; Rukn al-Din Kilij Arslan IV; Alauddin Kayqubad II; Aynu'l-Hayat Khatun
Names
- Ghīyāth al-Dīn Kaykhusraw bin Kayqubād
- House: House of Seljuq
- Father: Alâeddin Kayqubad I
- Mother: Mahpari Khatun
- Religion: Sunni Islam

Ghiyath al-Din Kaykhusraw ibn Kayqubād or Kaykhusraw II (Persian: غياث الدين كيخسرو بن كيقباد) was the sultan of the Seljuqs of Rûm from 1237 until his death in 1246. He ruled at the time of the Babai uprising and the Mongol invasion of Anatolia. He led the Seljuq army with its Christian allies at the Battle of Köse Dağ in 1243. He was the last of the Seljuq sultans to wield any significant power and died as a vassal of the Mongols.

== Succession ==
Kaykhusraw was the son of Kayqubad I and his wife Mahpari Khatun, who was Byzantine Greek by origin, Christian Byzantine Greek women being the dominant origin of the slave-concubines and wives of the Seljuk harem.

Although 'Kaykhusraw was the eldest, the sultan had chosen as heir the younger ‘Izz al-Din, one of his two sons by the Ayyubid princess Adila Khatun, daughter of al Adil I, sultan of Cairo and the Jazira In 1226, Kayqubad assigned the newly annexed Erzincan to Kaykhusraw. With the general Kamyar, the young prince participated in the conquest of Erzurum and later Ahlat.

In 1236–37, raiding Mongols assisted by the Georgians devastated the Anatolian countryside as far as the walls of Sivas and Malatya. In response, Kayqubad moved to punish the Georgians. As the Seljuq army approached, Queen Russudan of Georgia sued for peace, offering her daughter Tamar in marriage to Kaykhusraw. (Note: "He married the daughter of the king of Georgia and was passionately in love with her.") This marriage took place in 1238.

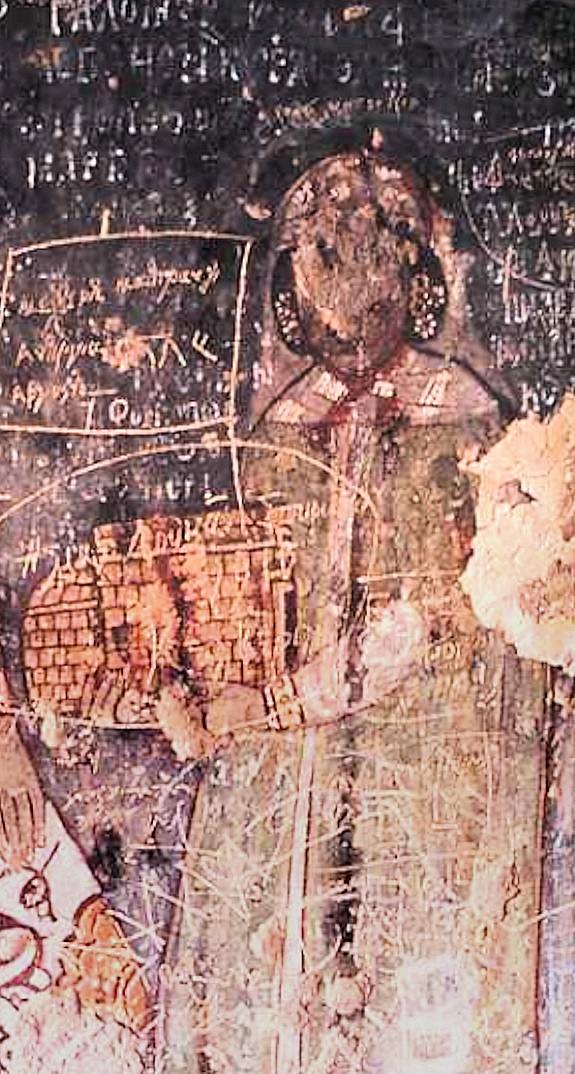
Likely depiction of Tamar (Gurju Khatun), Kırkdamaltı Kilisesi.

Upon the death of Kayqubad in 1237, Kaykhusraw seized the throne with the support of the great emirs of Anatolia. The architect of his early reign was a certain Sa'd al-Din Köpek, master of the hunt and minister of works under Kayqubad. Köpek excelled at political murder and sought to protect his newfound influence at the court with a series of executions. He captured Diyarbekir from Ayyubids in 1241.

== The Baba Ishak Rebellion ==
While the Mongols threatened the Seljuq state from the outside, a new danger appeared from within: a charismatic preacher, Baba Ishak, was fomenting rebellion among the Turkmen of Anatolia. This revolt is known as the Babai revolt.

Nomadic Turkmen had begun moving into Anatolia a few years prior to the Battle of Manzikert. After 1071, Turkic migration into the region went largely unchecked. Both their number and the persuasive power of their religious leaders, nominally Islamized shamans known as babas or dedes, played a large part in the conversion of formerly Christian Anatolia. The Persianized Seljuq military class expended considerable effort keeping these nomads from invading areas inhabited by farmers and from harassing neighboring Christian states. The Turkmen were pushed into marginal lands, mostly mountainous and frontier districts.

Baba Ishak was one such religious leader. Unlike his predecessors, whose influence was limited to smaller tribal groups, Baba Ishak's authority extended over a vast population of Anatolian Turkmen. It is not known what he preached, but his appropriation of the title rasul, normally applied to Muhammad, suggests something beyond mainstream Islam.

The revolt began ca. 1240 in the remote borderland of Kafarsud in the eastern Taurus Mountains and quickly spread north to the region of Amasya. Seljuq armies at Malatya and Amasya were destroyed. Soon the very heart of Seljuq Anatolia, the regions around Kayseri, Sivas, and Tokat, were under the control of Baba Ishak's supporters. Baba Ishak himself was killed, but the Turkmen continued their rebellion against the central Seljuq authority. The rebels were finally cornered and defeated near Kırşehir, probably in 1242 or early 1243. Simon of Saint-Quentin credits the victory to a large number of Frankish mercenaries employed by the sultan.

== Battle of Köse Dağ ==
In the winter of 1242–43, the Mongols under Bayju attacked Erzurum; the city fell without a siege. The Mongols prepared to invade Rum in the spring. To meet the threat, Kaykhusraw assembled soldiers from his allies and vassals. Simon of Saint-Quentin, an envoy of Pope Innocent IV on his way to the Great Khan, offers an account of the sultan's preparations. He reports that the king of Armenia was required to produce 1400 lances and the Greek Emperor of Nicaea 400 lances. Both rulers met the sultan in Kayseri to negotiate details. The Grand Komnenos of Trebizond contributed 200, while the young Ayyubid prince of Aleppo supplied 1000 horsemen. In addition to these, Kaykhusraw commanded the Seljuq army and irregular Turkmen cavalry, though both had been weakened by the Baba Ishak rebellion.

The army, except for the Armenians who were then considering an alliance with (or submission to) the Mongols, assembled at Sivas. Kaykhusraw and his allies set out to the east along the trunk road towards Erzurum. On 26 June 1243, they met the Mongols at the pass at Köse Dağ, between Erzincan and Gümüşhane. Kaykhusraw built a large army to confront the invasion, but his 80,000-strong force lacked the discipline and cohesion of the Mongols. A feigned retreat by the Mongol horsemen disorganized the Seljuqs, and Kaykhusraw's army was routed. The sultan collected his treasury and harem at Tokat and fled to Ankara. The Mongols seized Sivas, sacked Kayseri, but failed to move on Konya, the capital of the sultanate.

In the months following the battle, Muhadhdhab al-Din, the sultan's vizier, sought out the victorious Mongol leader. Since the sultan had fled, the embassy seems to have been the vizier's own initiative. The vizier succeeded in forestalling further Mongol devastation in Anatolia and saved Kaykhusraw's throne. Under conditions of vassalage and a substantial annual tribute, Kaykhusraw, his power much diminished, returned to Konya.

== Identity ==
According to Rustam Shukurov, it is likely that Kaykhusraw II, who was born from a Greek mother,"bore a dual confessional and ethnic identity".

== DNA analysis ==
According to a research, he suffered from multiple genetic disorders, including rheumatoid arthritis, which caused serious issues with the shape of his skull.

== Issue ==
Kaykhusraw II was survived by three sons who eventually succeeded him to the throne during a period of complex joint rule, as well as a daughter:

- Kaykaus II: The eldest son (b. c. 1235), who relied heavily on his maternal Greek family and Byzantine connections during his later reign and exile.
- Kilij Arslan IV: The second son (b. c. 1237), who was later supported by the Mongol court as a rival claimant to the Seljuk throne.
- Kayqubad II : The youngest son (b. c. 1239), born to Tamar (Gurju Khatun). He was designated by Kaykhusraw II as his primary and preferred successor to the sultanate.
- Aynu'l-Hayat Khatun: A daughter born to Gurju Khatun, who became a major independent royal patron of the Mevlevi Sufi networks in Erzurum.

== Legacy ==
Kaykhusraw died leaving three sons: 'Izz al-Din Kaykaus, aged 11, son of the daughter of a Greek priest; 9-year-old Rukn al-Din Kilij Arslan, son of a Turkish woman of Konya; and 'Ala al-Din Kayqubad, son of the Georgian princess Tamar and at age 7 youngest of the three boys.

Kaykhusraw had named his youngest child Kayqubad as his successor, but because he was a weakly child, the new vizier Shams al-Din Isfahani placed Kayqubad's two underage brothers Kaykaus II and Kilij Arslan IV on the throne as well, as co-rulers. This was an attempt to maintain Seljuq control of Anatolia in the face of the Mongol threat.

Although weakened, Seljuq power remained largely intact at the time of Kaykhusraw's death in 1246. The Mongols failed to capture either the sultan's treasury or his capital when they had the chance, and his Anatolian lands escaped the worst of the invaders’ depredations. The real blow to the dynasty was Kaykhusrev's inability to name a competent successor. With the choice of the three young brothers, Seljuq power in Anatolia no longer lay with Seljuq princes but instead devolved into the hands of Seljuq court administrators.

== Marriage ==
Kaykhusraw II's most prominent and culturally significant union was with the Georgian princess Gurju Khatun (born Tamar), the daughter of Queen Rusudan of Georgia. Arriving at the Seljuk court in 1237, her marriage was a primary diplomatic event intended to secure the sultanate's eastern borders.

Gurju Khatun rapidly achieved exceptional status at court, being elevated to the premier rank of Malikat al-Malikat (Queen of Queens). Her domestic and political prominence was heavily reflected in the state's numismatics; Kaykhusraw II broke with Islamic dynastic tradition by striking her likeness onto the state's silver coinage, resulting in the iconic "Lion and Sun" (shir-o-khurshid) motif as a symbolic representation of their union.

== Coinage ==
Between 1240 and 1243 (638 and 641 A.H.) a series of remarkable silver dirhams were struck in Kaykhusraw's name at Sivas and Konya depicting a lion and sun. While coins with images are not unknown in Islamic lands, particularly in the centuries following the Crusades, some Islamic traditions forbid representations of living things.

Several explanations of the lion and sun have been offered. One suggests that the images represent the constellation Leo, the astrological sign of Kaykhusraw's beloved Georgian wife Tamar. Another says that the lion represents Kaykhusraw and the sun Tamar.

== In popular culture ==
In the Turkish television series Diriliş: Ertuğrul, Kaykhusraw II is portrayed by Turkish actor Burak Dakak.

In the Turkish Drama Series Rumi,Sultan Kaykhusraw II is depicted as the ruling Sultan by actor Burç Kümbetlioğlu.

== Sources ==
- Blessing, Patricia; Goshgarian, Rachel (2017). Architecture and Landscape in Medieval Anatolia, 1100-1500. Edinburgh University Press. p. 233. ISBN 978-1-4744-1130-1. "Following Mahperi, Kayqubad's second marriage was to an Ayyubid princess, the daughter of al Adil I, sultan of Cairo and the Jazira"
- Cahen, Claude (2001). The Formation of Turkey: The Seljukid Sultanate of Rum: Eleventh to Fourteenth Century. Translated by Holt, P.M. Routledge. ISBN 978-1-317-87626-7.
- Claude Cahen, “Keyhusrev II" Encyclopaedia of Islam, ed. by P. Bearman, et al. (Brill 2007).
- Cahen, Claude (1968). Pre-Ottoman Turkey: a general survey of the material and spiritual culture and history c. 1071-1330. Translated by Jones-Williams, J. Taplinger.
- Canby, Sheila R.; Beyazit, Deniz; Rugiadi, Martina; Peacock, A.C.S., eds. (2016). Court and Cosmos: The Great Age of the Seljuqs. The Metropolitan Museum of Art.
- Crane, H. (1993). "Notes on Saldjūq Architectural Patronage in Thirteenth Century Anatolia". Journal of the Economic and Social History of the Orient. 36 (1): 1–57. doi:10.1163/156852093X00010.
- Hillenbrand, Carole (2007). "Sa'd al-Dīn Köpek b. Muhammad". In Bearman, P. (ed.). Encyclopaedia of Islam. Brill.
- Humphreys, R. S. (1977). From Saladin to the Mongols: The Ayyubids of Damascus 1193-1260. SUNY Press. p. 389
- Peacock, A.C.S.; Yildiz, Sara Nur, eds. (2013). The Seljuks of Anatolia: Court and Society in the Medieval Middle East. I.B.Tauris. ISBN 978-0857733467.
- Vryonis, Speros (1971). The Decline of Medieval Hellenism in Asia Minor and the Process of Islamization from the Eleventh through the Fifteenth Century. University of California Press.
- Dr. Antony Eastmond, Courtauld Institute of Art (25–28 June 2007). "Intermarriage and its impact on art in Anatolia in the 13th century". International Sevgi Gönül Byzantine Studies Symposium, Istanbul. Archived from the original on 31 July 2009.

Preceded by Kayqubad I	Sultan of Rûm; 1237–1246	Succeeded by Kaykaus II
