= Kilij Arslan V =

Sultan of Rum
- Reign: 1310–1318
- Predecessor: Possibly Mesud III
- Successor: None
- Born: c. 1255
- Died: Possibly 1318 (Aged 63)
- Dynasty: Seljuk
- Father: Kayqubad III
- Religion: Sunni Islam

Kilij Arslan V was the son of Kayqubad III, sultan of the Sultanate of Rum. While some historians believe that Kilij Arslan V ruled the state between 1310 and 1318, most medieval scholars argue that no such sultan ever existed, and that Kilij Arslan V was merely an impostor claimant to the throne.

== Bibliography ==
- Sümer, F. (2009). "III. Anadolu Selçukluları (1075–1308)". İslâm Ansiklopedisi. Vol. 36. pp. 380–384.

Preceded by Mesud III?	Sultan of Rûm; 1310–1318	Succeeded by Office abolished
