= Kilij Arslan IV =

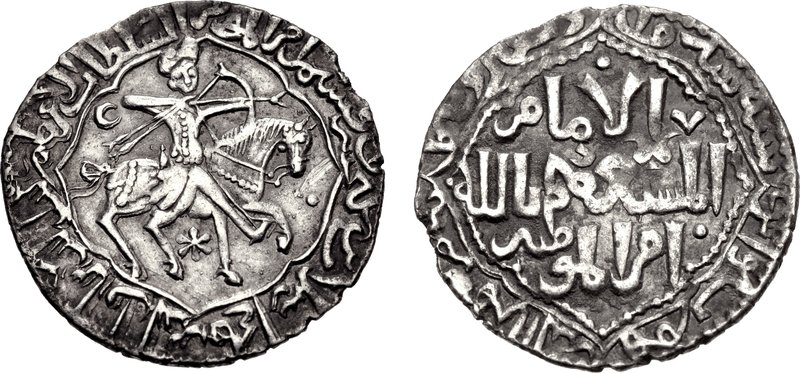
- Rare coin minted under Kilij Arslan IV at Sivas in 1248/49, citing Abbasid caliph al-Musta'sim in the three lines.

Sultan of Rum
- First rule: 1249–1254
- Predecessor: Kaykhusraw II
- Successor: Kayqubad II
- Co-sultans: Kayqubad II (1249–1254); Kaykaus II (1249–1254)
- Second rule: 1257–1265
- Predecessor: Kayqubad II
- Successor: Kaykhusraw III
- Co-sultan: Kaykaus II (1257–1262)
- Born: 1237 or 1240
- Died: 1265 (aged 25 or 28)
- Consort: Gumaḉ Khatun; Fatima Khatun; Gazalya Khatun
- Issue: Saljuk Khatun; Kaykhusraw III; Hudavend Khatun (Note: Hudavend Khatun, daughter of Kilij Arslan IV and widow of Arghun, was granted governance over Tokat and Niğde by the Ilkhanate, ruling as queen from 1292 until her death in 1332, and was buried in the tomb of Hüdavent Hatun.)
Names
- Rukn ad-Dīn Qilij Arslān ibn Kaykhusraw
- House: Seljuk
- Father: Kaykhusraw II
- Mother: Greek concubine
- Religion: Islam

Kilij Arslan IV (Old Anatolian Turkish: قِلِج اَرسلان) or Rukn ad-Dīn Qilij Arslān ibn Kaykhusraw (Turkish: Rükneddin Kılıçarslan, Persian: رکن الدین قلیچ ارسلان بن کیخسرو) was twice the Seljuk Sultan of Rûm from 1249 to 1254 and later from 1257 to 1265.

However, a jarlig issued by Güyük Khan confirmed him as sultan over his elder brother, Kaykaus II in 1248. But this jarlig would quickly be worthless after Güyük's death in the same year. Later, Arslan's supporters killed Shams al-Din Isfahani, a supporter of his brother, Kaykaus II (a rival to the throne). The death of Isfahani's successor in 1254, Jalāl-al-Din Qaraṭāy, left a power vacuum which was filled by competition by supporters of the two brothers. Kaykaus II would emerge the victor in 1257 with support from the Empire of Nicaea, but would be later defeated in 1262, as Arslan was supported by the Ilkhanate.

In the 1260s, Mu'in al-Din Parwana redistributed Seljuk crown lands among his followers. He did this to secure his position but would be met with protests from Arslan. This eventually led to Arslan's execution in 1265 by Parwana.

== Sources ==
- Hillenbrand, Carole (1993). "Muʿīn al-Dīn Sulaymān Parwāna". In Bosworth, C. E.; van Donzel, E.; Heinrichs, W. P. & Pellat, Ch. (eds.). The Encyclopaedia of Islam, Second Edition. Volume VII: Mif–Naz. Leiden: E. J. Brill. pp. 479–480. ISBN 978-90-04-09419-2.
- Jackson, Peter (2017). The Mongols and the Islamic World: From Conquest to Conversion. Yale University Press. ISBN 978-0300125337. JSTOR 10.3366/j.ctt1n2tvq0. (registration required)
- Peacock, Andrew (2010). "Saljuqs iii. Saljuqs of Rum". Encyclopaedia Iranica.
- Peacock, A.C.S.; Yıldız, Sara Nur, eds. (2012). The Seljuks of Anatolia: Court and Society in the Medieval Middle East. I.B.Tauris. ISBN 978-1848858879.
- Saunders, J. J. (2001). The History of the Mongol Conquests. University of Pennsylvania Press.
- Yetkin, S. Kemal (1961). "The Turbeh of Gumaç Hatun, a Seljūk Monument". Ars Orientalis. 4.

Preceded by ʿIzz ad-Dīn Kay Kāwus II (1246–1262)	Sultan of Rum; 1249–1266	Succeeded by Ghiyāth ad-DīnKay Khusraw III (1266–1282)
