= Mansur ibn Qutalmish =

Son of Qutalmish

Мansur ibn Qutalmish
- Emir

Ruler of Western Anatolia
- Reign: 1072 - 1078
- Successor: Suleiman I (as Sultan of Rum)
- Died: 1078
- Dynasty: Seljuk dynasty
- Father: Qutalmish
- Religion: Sunni Islam

Mansur ibn Qutalmish (Persian: منصور بن قتلمش; died 1078) was the eldest son of Qutalmish —the founder of the Anatolian branch of the Seljuk dynasty—and the brother of Suleiman-Shah I, who would go on to become the first Sultan of Rum. Together with his brother, he sought to break away from the Seljuk Empire and establish an independent Seljuk state in Anatolia. He was killed in battle against Porsuk, a commander serving under Sultan Malik-Shah I.
