= Burak Dakak =

Turkish actor (born 1998)

- Born: 8 June 1998 (age 27); Ankara, Turkey
- Occupation: Actor
- Years active: 2008–present

Burak Dakak (born 8 June 1998) is a Turkish actor.

== Biography ==
Burak Dakak was born on 8 June 1998 in Ankara. He started his acting career at the age of 10. In 2008, he began playing the role of Servet in Doğruluk Ekseni. In 2009, he appeared as young Mert in Ezel. He studied at Bahçeşehir University – Cinema and Theatre School.

He has appeared in hit comedy series such as Geniş Aile, "Prens". He has appeared in period series such as Benim Adım Gültepe, Muhteşem Yüzyıl: Kösem, and Diriliş: Ertuğrul.

Between 2019 and 2021, he starred in the TV series Çukur.

He had a leading role in Umuda Kelepçe Vurulmaz and Güzel Günler.

== Filmography ==
=== Web Series ===
Year	Title	Role	Episodes
2025	Prens		

=== Tv Series ===
Year	Title	Role	Episodes
2008	Doğruluk Ekseni	Servet	1-18
2009	Ezel	young Mert Uçar	1-15
2009	Geniş Aile		
2009	Kendi Okulumuza Doğru		
2011	Kolej Günlüğü	Arda	
2013	Ekip	Mesut	20
2013–2014	Hıyanet Sarmalı	young Savaş	2-35
2014	Benim Adım Gültepe	Fevzi	1-8
2016	Muhteşem Yüzyıl: Kösem	Şehzade Mehmed	21-28
2016–2017	Umuda Kelepçe Vurulmaz	Onur	1-15
2018	Diriliş: Ertuğrul	Kaykhusraw II	108–120
2018–2019	Gülperi	Hasan Taşkın	1-30
2019–2021	Çukur	Akın Koçovalı	66-131
2022–	Güzel Günler	Mihran	1-

A tv series named Rumi(2023) features the actor as Shams al-Din Isfahani .
