= Tuqaq =

Turkic bey and early Seljuqid

Tuqaq (Note: Also known as Duqaq or Dukak (Persian: دقاق, Turkish: Dukak bey, Turkmen: Dukak beg or Dukak Temür Yalïgh, Azerbaijani: Dukak bəy)) is described as the father of Seljuq, the founder of the eponymous dynasty, in the Maliknamah tradition.

== Sources ==
=== Maliknamah ===
The Maliknamah, which was drafted during the reign of Tuqaq's great-great-grandson Alp Arslan (r. 1063-1072) from oral lores, was perhaps the only significant text to document the earliest history of Seljuqs and Tuqaq, in particular. The relevant information was obtained from Amir Inanj Beg, a clan elder with extensive knowledge of genealogies. Though Maliknamah is not extant, extracts concerning our subject survive in a few works—al-Kāmil fit-Tārīkh by Ibn al-Athir [1231 CE], Aḵbār al-Dawlat al-Saljūqīya by Ibn Husayni [early 13th c], Chronicon Syriacum by Bar Hebraeus [mid 13th c.], and Rawżat aṣ-ṣafāʾ by Mirkhvand [late 15th c.] (Note: Neither al-Athir nor Ibn Husayni cite the Maliknamah; however, a comparison with Mirkhvand shows common phrases and wordings.) Besides, Ibn al-Adim's Bughyat al-Talab fī Tārīkh Ḥalab quotes Beg directly and was likely derived from Maliknamah.

=== Saljuq-nama ===
Saljuq-nama, dedicated to Toghrul III and drafted in 1175, notes that Seljuq is the son of Luqman. Tuqaq is not mentioned, and no details are provided about Luqman. The many histories that derive from the Saljuq-nama reproduce the genealogy. Some historians assert Luqman to be a misreading of Tuqaq; however, it might be that its author, Zahir al-Din Nishapuri, had intended to allude to the eponymous Koranic sage than any historical persona.

=== Others ===
Ibn Hassul—who served as the secretary of Tughril (r. 1037 - 1063) and whose epistle pre-dated the Maliknamah—discusses early Seljuqid history but does not mention Tuqaq; (Note: The work Tafḍīl al-Atrāk is lost but the introduction survives.) however, he ascribes the conflict alluded to Tuqaq in Maliknama, with most of its details, to Seljuq. Jirjis al-Makin Ibn al-'Amid's al-Majmu` al-Mubarak described Tuqaq in the context of early Seljuqid history but does not cite any source.

== Ethno-political affiliations ==
The Seljuqs (and thus, Tuqaq) are traditionally traced to the Qiniq sub-tribe of the Oghuz Turks. (Note: From the eight to tenth century, the Oghuz Turks migrated across Eurasia — from their ancestral lands in Mongolia to Transoxania to the Volga pastures — for reasons which are not very clear. They formed a polity which was spread over a vast area, overlapping with major powers like the Khajars and Samanids, and was ruled (?) by an yabghu.) However, the Maliknama tradition describes Tuqaq as a Khazar Turk; whether this is a faithful depiction of historical reality or an attempt by the Seljuqs to cast links with the illustrious Khazar Empire remains debatable. Clifford Edmund Bosworth leans in favor of the latter while A. C. S. Peacock leans against, arguing that the empire carried little prestige in the Arabic world to warrant the production of fabricated connections in the eleventh century.

== Biography ==
Mirkhvand quotes from the Maliknamah in the fullest extent: Tuqaq was the Chief Counsel of "the King (Yabghu) of Khazars". He carried the sobriquet Temuryaligh (lit. Iron Bow) (Note: The sobriquet probably alluded to his might and influence.) and was the father of Seljuq. Tuqaq gained repute among the local nobility, mostly composed of Turks, after objecting to the Yabghu's decision to raid other innocent Turk tribes; even after assaulting the Yabghu with a mace and toppling him from his horse in the course of his dissent, he escaped from being punished since the nobles did not consent to have him killed. Tuqaq and the Yabghu buried their differences soon; he would die, years later, while accompanying the Yabghu in a military mission.

Hebraeus name-drops Tuqaq as Seljuq's father; he is simply noted to have been an excellent warrior in service of the Khakans of Khazar. al-Adim notes Beg to have held Tuqaq as the father of Seljuq, and a noble of the Khajar Turks. Accounts by Ibn Husayni as well as al-Athir not only mention Tuqaq as Seljuq's father but also describe the conflict, though altering key details. (Note: Both al-Athir and Husayni, probably out of their non-familiarity with Turkmen culture, notes Temuryaligh to be the meaning of the name Tuqaq!) In their account, Amir Tuqaq had objected to the Yabghu of Turks raiding Islamic lands. Also, after the faceoff, the court nobles played no significant role and did not come in the aid of Tuqaq. (Note: In Husayni's narrative, Tuqaq was successfully incarcerated and he could only repose faith in the God. In al-Athir's narrative, there was a clash between the Yabghu's men and those who supported Tuqaq; in the end, he was left alone. Both agree that the Yabghu and Tuqaq reconciled their differences.) It is likely that both Husayni and al-Athir were sourcing from a variant edition of the Maliknamah, that was perhaps circulated by the Seljuqs themselves, to embed themselves within a framework of Islamic piety.

== Legacy ==
After his death, Seljuq became a subashy before breaking away to form a polity of his own.

== See also ==
- Turkic people
- Oghuz Turks
- Seljuq bey
- Seljuq dynasty
- Turkomans

== Bibliography ==
- Bosworth, C.E. (2011). The History of the Seljuq State: A Translation with Commentary of the Akhbar al-dawla al-saljuqiyya. Routledge. ISBN 9781138789036.
- Cahen, Claude (2007). "The Malik-Nāma and the History of Seljuqid Origins". In Bosworth, C.E. (ed.). The Turks in the Early Islamic World. Translated by Simpson, Philip. ISBN 9781315236711.
- Frenkel, Yehoshua (2015). The Turkic Peoples in Medieval Arabic Writings. Routledge. ISBN 9781315752952.
- Lange, Christian (2012). Seljuqs: Politics, Society and Culture. Edinburgh University Press.
- Mecit, Songul (2013). The Rum Seljuqs: Evolution of a Dynasty. Routledge. ISBN 9781134509065.
- Peacock, A.C.S (2015). The Great Seljuq Empire. Edinburgh University Press. ISBN 9780748638277.
- Peacock, A.C.S (2010). Early Seljuq History: A New Interpretation. Routledge. ISBN 9780415864824.
- Richards, D.S (2010). The Annals of the Saljuq Turks: Selections from al-Kamil fi'l-Ta'rikh of Ibn al-Athir. Routledge. ISBN 9780415583138.
