= Kayqubad II =

Seljuk Sultan of Rum from 1249 to 1254

- Dirham in the name of Kayqubad II and his two co-sultans.

Sultan of Rum
- Reign: 1249–1254
- Co-sultans: Kaykaus II (1249–1254); Kilij Arslan IV (1249–1254)
- Born: c. 1238–1239
- Died: 1256 (aged 16–18)
Names
- Alā al-Dīn Kayqubād bin Kaykhusraw
- Persian: علا الدين كيقبادان بن كيخسرو
- Father: Kaykhusraw II
- Mother: Gurju Khatun

Kayqubad II (Old Anatolian Turkish: كیقباد, Turkish: Alâeddin Keykubad, Persian: علاء الدين كيقباد بن كيخسرو, ʿAlāʾ ad-Dīn Kayqubād bin Kaykhusraw, c. 1238-1239 – 1254/1256) was the Seljuk Sultan of Rûm from 1249-1257. He was the only son of the Seljuq Sultan of Rûm Kaykhusraw II and the Georgian princess Gurju Khatun (known as Tamar). Kaykhusraw's elder sons, by different mothers, were Kaykaus II and Kilij Arslan IV, and also served as sultan after their father's death, often simultaneously. As son of the sultan’s favorite wife, he was designated heir. He had a weak constitution and was likely seven years old at the time of his father’s death in 1246.

== Reign ==
The vizier to the sultan, Shams al-Din Isfahani, seeking to defend a degree of Seljuk sovereignty in Anatolia from the Mongols, put Kayqubad II on the throne together with his two elder brothers, Kaykaus II and Kilij Arslan IV.

In 1254 the Mongols asked that Kaykaus II, then nineteen years old, come in person to Möngke, the Great Khan. The brothers, at a conference in Kayseri, decided that Kayqubad II should go to in his stead. The voyage to Möngke’s capital at Karakhorum would be arduous. Kayqubad delayed his trip until at least 1256. He witnessed Bayju assembling his horsemen for the migration to Anatolia and sent messages advising his brothers to comply with the Mongol’s demands. One day on the road Kayqubad was found dead. The vizier Baba Tughra’i, who had joined the embassy en route, was accused but nothing came of it. Kayqubad was buried somewhere in the wastes between Anatolia and Mongolia.

== Sources ==
- Claude Cahen, Pre-Ottoman Turkey: a general survey of the material and spiritual culture and history, trans. J. Jones-Williams, (New York: Taplinger, 1968) 271-277.
- Wolff, Robert L. and Hazard, H. W., A History of the Crusades: Volume Two, The Later Crusades 1187-1311, The University of Wisconsin Press, Madison, 1977, pg. 726

Preceded by Kaykhusraw II	Sultan of Rûm; 1249–1254	Succeeded by Kilij Arslan IV
