= Shams al-Din Isfahani =

Persian vizier and military commander

Shams al-Din Isfahani (Persian: شمس الدین اصفهانی; died 1249) was a Persian vizier and military commander in medieval Anatolia. He served as deputy (na'eb) to Sultan Kaykhusraw II (r. 1237-1246) of the Seljuk Sultanate of Rum and as the commander-in-chief of his army. After the vesselage of the Sultanate to the Mongol Empire, he became deputy to the Mongol ruler Batu Khan (r. 1227–1255) in Anatolia. He later reached the apex of his power when he became the new vizier of the Sultanate of Rum, and its de facto ruler for a short period after Kaykhusraw II's death.

== Birth ==
He was most likely born in Persia.

== Life ==
Following their defeat at the Battle of Köse Dağ, the Seljuks sent a diplomatic mission headed by Shams al-Din Isfahani, the deputy (na'eb) of Kaykhusraw II and the commander-in-chief of the Sultanate's army, to the Mongol ruler Batu Khan. Eventually, Batu allowed Kaykhusraw II to stay in "power" as a subject ruler of the Mongols in return for a significant annual tribute. For his efforts, Isfahani was lavishly rewarded; he was made Batu Khan's deputy in Anatolia. When Kaykhusraw's vizier Mohadhdhab al-Din died, Isfahani became the new vizier of the Sultanate of Rum, thus cementing his power over Anatolia. According to Andrew Peacock: "henceforth the Saljuq sultans were to play a secondary political role, pawns of the officials appointed by competing Mongol factions".

After Kaykhusraw II died in 1246, Isfahani seized "the real power in the sultanate". He installed Kaykhusraw's eldest son, known regnally as Kaykaus II, on the Sultanate's throne despite the fact that the late Sultan Kaykhusraw II had nominated Kayqubad II as his sole heir. In the meantime, Isfahani had appointed his own allies to key positions within the Sultanate's realm. He also married a woman named Produlia.

Things were going well for Isfahani, until Mongol ruler Güyük Khan (r. 1246-1248) decided to confirm Kaykhusraw's second son, known regnally as Kilij Arslan IV, as the new sultan. In all likelihood, Güyük "was probably trying to use this appointment to undermine his rival Batu who had claimed sovereignty over Anatolia".

=== Death ===
Isfahani was eventually arrested and murdered in 1249 by supporters of Kilij Arslan IV, the second son of the late Sultan Kaykhusraw IIand another underage brother of Kayqubad II and Kaykaus II. He was succeeded by Jalal al-Din Qaratay, one of his former allies.

== In popular culture ==
In drama series Rumi(2023), he is portrayed by the Turkish actor Burak Dakak.
