= Mesud II =

Last Seljuk Sultan of Rum

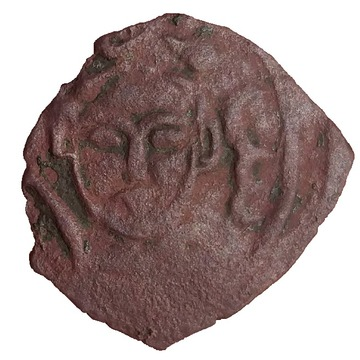
- Coin of Mesud II made between 1284–1296

Sultan of Rum
- First reign: 1284–1297
- Predecessor: Kaykhusraw III
- Successor: Kayqubad III
- Second reign: 1303–1307/1308
- Predecessor: Kayqubad III
- Successor: Mesud III?
- Born: 1262
- Died: 1307/1308 (aged 45/46)
- Burial: Samsun, Turkey
- Issue: Ghiyath ad-Din Mesud III? Tâçeddin Altunbaş
Names
- Ghiyāth ad-Dīn Mas'ūd bin Kaykāwūs
- Dynasty: Seljuk
- Father: Kaykaus II
- Religion: Islam

Ghiyath al-Dīn Me’sud ibn Kaykaus or Mesud II (Old Anatolian Turkish: مَسعود دوم, Ghiyāth ad-Dīn Mas'ūd bin Kaykāwūs; Turkish: Gıyaseddin Mesud, Persian: غياث الدين مسعود بن كيكاوس) bore the title of Sultan of Rûm at various times between 1284 and 1308. He was a vassal of the Mongols under Mahmud Ghazan and exercised no real authority. Mesud died in 1308, the last of the Seljuks of Rum.

== Reign ==
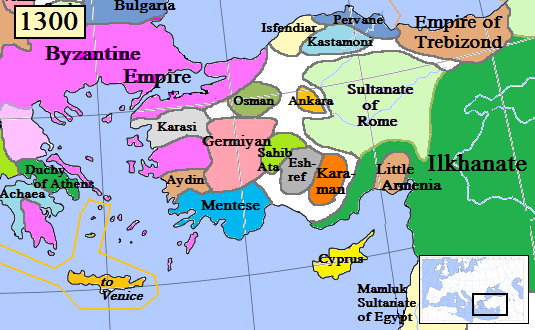
Dissolution of the Seljuk Sultanate into Turkish Beyliks and other states around Anatolia, c. 1300

Mesud was the eldest son of Kaykaus II. He spent part of his youth as an exile in the Crimea and lived for a time in Constantinople, then the capital of the Byzantine Empire. He appears first in Anatolia in 1280 as a pretender to the throne. In 1284 the new Ilkhanid Sultan Ahmed Tekuder deposed and executed the Seljuq sultan Kaykhusraw III and installed Mesud in his place. Ahmad's successor, Arghun, divided the Seljuq lands and granted Konya and the western half of the kingdom to the deposed sultan's two young sons. Mesud invaded with a small force, had the two boys killed, and established himself in the city in 1286.

Mesud led several campaigns against the emerging Turkmen principalities, the Beyliks, always on behalf of the Mongols and usually with Mongol troops. Notable among these is the expedition beginning late in 1286 against the Germiyanids. The Germiyanids were a warlike band of Turkmen ancestry, settled by the Seljuqs a generation before in southwestern Anatolia to keep the more unruly Turkmen nomads in check. Mesud conducted the campaign under the tutelage of the vizier and elder statesman, Fakhr al-Din Ali. Though there were a few successes on the battlefield, the highly mobile Germiyanids remained a significant force in the region. Mesud and his Mongol allies conducted similarly futile expeditions against the Karamanids, Eshrefids and Ottomans.

In 1297 in an atmosphere characterized by intrigue and near constant revolt against the distant Ilkhan authority, both on the part of Mongol officers and local Turkoman potentates, the hapless Mesud was implicated in a plot against the Ilkhanate. He was pardoned but deprived of his throne and confined in Tabriz. He was replaced with Kayqubad III who soon became involved in a similar plot and was executed by Mahmud Ghazan. The impoverished Mesud returned to the throne in 1303.

By 1308, Mesud was dead, the last member of the Seljuks of Rum.

Findings in 2015 propose his grave has been identified in Samsun.

== In popular culture ==
In the Turkish TV Series Kuruluş: Osman (2014–2019) He had a great role in the series, he is portrayed by the Turkish actors, Sener Savas and later Kubilay Penbeklioğlu.

== Sources ==
- Peacock, A.C.S.; Yildiz, Sara Nur, eds. (2013). The Seljuks of Anatolia: Court and Society in the Medieval Middle East. I.B.Tauris. ISBN 978-0857733467.
- Foss, Clive (2022). The Beginnings of the Ottoman Empire. Oxford University Press.183
- Kesık, Muharrem (2004). "MESUD II - An article published in Turkish Encyclopedia of Islam". TDV Encyclopedia of Islam (in Turkish). Vol. 29 (Mekteb - Misir Mevlevihanesi). Ankara. pp. 342–344. ISBN 978-9753894159.

Preceded by Kaykhusraw III	Sultan of Rûm; 1284–1297	Succeeded by Kayqubad III
Preceded by Kayqubad III	Sultan of Rûm; 1303–1308	Succeeded by Mesud III
