= Aq Sunqur al-Hajib =

Seljuk governor of Aleppo and father of Imad ad-Din Zengi

Abu Said Aq Sunqur al-Hajib (full name: Qasim ad-Dawla Aksungur al-Hajib) was the Seljuk governor of Aleppo under Sultan Malik Shah I. He was beheaded in 1094 following accusations of treason by Tutush I, the Seljuk Turkish ruler of Damascus.

Aq-Sunqur was the father of Imad al-Din Zengi, the founder of the Zengid dynasty.

== Biography ==
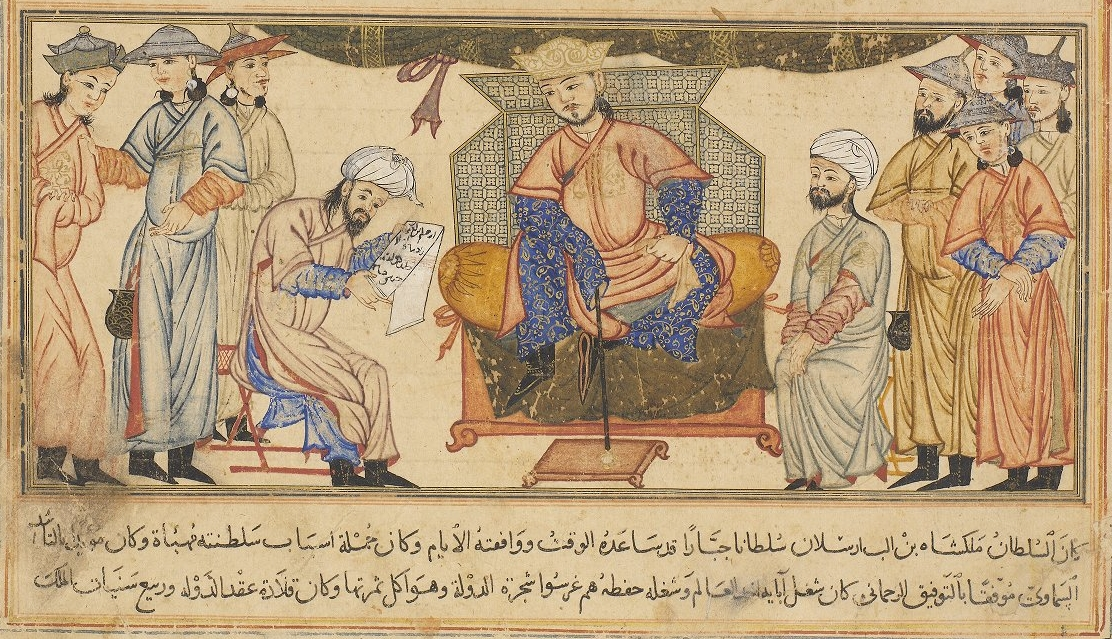
Coronation of Malik-Shah I. This painting is from the book Jami' al-tawarikh (literally "Compendium of Chronicles", but often referred to as The Universal History or History of the World), by Rashid al-Din, published in Tabriz, Persia, 1307 A.D.

=== Governor of Aleppo ===
Aq Sunqur was one of the Turcoman beys that were assigned in 1084 by Sultan Malik-Shah I to aid Fakhr ad-Dawla ibn Jahir in the capture of the Uqaylid realm. Malik-Shah then made Aq-Sunqur the governor of Aleppo in 1086.

Aq Sunqur subsequently ruled for eight years. Because of the many conflicts between the rulers and princes of the regions, conditions within the city were difficult. A combination of high taxes and goods prices led to an increase in crime.

Aq-Sunqur began reforming by fixing the security situation in Aleppo and its environs. He activated the Hudud in Islam, repelling thieves and bandits and stamping out corruption. He increased the use of the police to secure civilian rights. He used the police authority to protect people rather than to control them. Aq-Sunqur created the "principle of collective responsibility" for every village or sector, which meant that if a village was raided by thieves, the whole village shared the responsibility of defending it.

Because of his policy to make order in the city, it became a suitable place for trading and farming, the economy recovered and inflation went down. He asked the people to not remove their goods from the road should they travel, stating that he would guarantee that their goods would not be stolen.

=== Conflict with Tutush and death ===
In 1089, Aq Sunqur was sent together with Bozan and Yağısıyan by Malik Shah to aid his brother Tutush to capture cities that the Fatimids had reconquered under Badr al-Jamali. However, the coalition fell apart when Aq Sunqur refused to continue the siege of Tripoli after he had been bribed and claimed the city had proclaimed allegiance.

After the death of Malik Shah, Tutush tried to become Sultan himself and Aq Sunqur first supported his bid until he and Bozan defected again, forcing Tutush to withdraw. In return, Tutush marched on Aq Sunqur in March/April together with Yağısıyan. Aq Sunqur was defeated and captured in battle on 27 May 1094 after a part of his Türkmen defected. Aq Sunqur was then decapitated together with fourteen others by Tutush. He died when his son Zengi was 10 years old.

== Legacy ==
Ibn al-Qalanisi said in his book The history of Damascus: that he was just with the people, he protected the roads, guaranteed order, treated religion properly, attacked corruption and removed the bad people. Ibn Kathir and Ali ibn al-Athir too wrote about him that he had a good reputation.

== Sources ==
- Basan, Osman Aziz (2010). The Great Seljuqs: A History. Routledge. ISBN 1136953930.
- Maalouf, Amin (1985). The Crusades Through Arab Eyes. Schocken.

Regnal titles
Preceded by Al Sharif Bin Al Habiby	Sultan of Aleppo; 1086–1094	Succeeded by Tutush I
