= Mesud III =

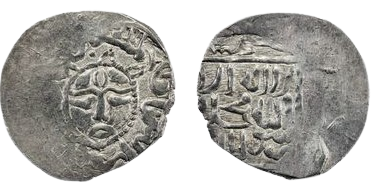
- Coin of Mesud III made in an uncertain rebel City (Rûm)

Sultan of Rum
- Reign: 1307–1308
- Predecessor: Mesud II
- Successor: Office abolished or Kilij Arslan V?
- Died: 1308 (age unknown)
Names
- Ghiyath ad-Din Mesud III
- Dynasty: Seljuk
- Father: Kayqubad III (V. Gordlevsky); Mesud II (T. Rice)
- Religion: Sunni Islam

Ghiyath al-Dīn Me’sud III (also spelled Masʿūd III) was a Seljuk prince and the last sultan of the Seljuk Sultanate of Rum (Anatolian Seljuks), ruling briefly in the early 14th century. His reign marked the effective end of Seljuk political authority in Anatolia.

== Background ==
Mesud III was either the son of Kayqubad III or the son of Mesud II. By this period, the Sultanate of Rum had lost most of its autonomy, and real authority lay with Mongol governors and powerful local emirs rather than the Seljuk court., a Seljuk sultan who ruled under the dominance of the Mongol Ilkhanate. By the late 13th century, the Sultanate of Rum had lost most of its independence following the Mongol victory at the Battle of Köse Dağ in 1243.

During Mesud III's lifetime, real political and military power in Anatolia was held by Mongol officials and by semi-independent Turkish principalities (beyliks), while the Seljuk sultan functioned largely as a symbolic ruler.

== Reign ==
Mesud III ascended the throne around 1307, after the death or removal of his uncle. His reign was short and largely nominal, with little direct control over the territory traditionally ruled by the Seljuks.

Contemporary sources provide few details about his administration. No major military campaigns, reforms, or construction projects are attributed to him. Authority in Anatolia was exercised primarily by Mongol governors and local rulers, particularly the Karamanids and other emerging beyliks.

== Death ==
Mesud III died around 1308, although the circumstances and exact date of his death are unknown. His death marked the end of the Seljuk Sultanate of Rum, as no successor was installed and the title ceased to have political significance.

== Legacy ==
Mesud III is generally regarded as the final Seljuk sultan of Anatolia. His reign symbolizes the transition from Seljuk rule to the Beylik period, during which Anatolia was divided among several Turkish principalities.

One of these principalities, the Ottoman Beylik, would later rise to dominate Anatolia and eventually establish the Ottoman Empire.

Preceded by Mesud II	Sultan of Rûm; 1307–1308	Succeeded by Office abolished or Kilij Arslan V?
