= Battle of Nishapur (1038) =

- Part of the Seljuk-Ghaznavid Wars
Date	1038
Location	Nishapur, Iran
Result	Seljuk victory

Belligerents
Seljuk Empire	Ghaznavid Empire

Commanders and leaders
Chaghri Beg; Ibrahim Inal; Tughril Beg	Mas'ud I

Strength
12,000–15,000	25,000–50,000

Casualties and losses
Unknown	Unknown

The Battle of Nishapur occurred in 1038 when the Seljuk Turks scored a victory over the Ghaznavid army at Nishapur.

In 1035 the Seljuk Turks defeated the Ghaznavids at Nisa. They inflicted another defeat on the Ghaznavids in 1037 at Merv and Herat.

The Seljuk Turks crossed the Oxus river and occupied most of Khorasan. In 1038 the Seljuks decisively defeated the Ghazanvids who were led by Mesud, son of Mahmud, at Nishapur.

The victories of the Seljuks against the Ghaznavids continued at Sarakhs and Dandanaqan. Members of the Seljuk family conducted additional aggressive campaigns in order to collect booty and check their rivals.
