= Early medieval states in Kazakhstan =

During the earlier medieval period, a succession of mainly Turkic states ruled in the area of present-day Kazakhstan.

No.	State	Establishment and fall	Capital	Territory	People	Language
1	First Turkic Khaganate	552–603	Suyab	Altay, Kazakhstan, Central Asia, Caucasia, Mongolia, Northern China	Göktürks, Teleuts, Kipchaks, Khazars, Yenisei Kyrgyz, Sogdian.	Old Turkic
2	Western Turkic Khaganate	581–742	Suyab	Kazakhstan, Central Asia, Caucasia, Eastern Turkestan, Crimea, coast of Volga	Göktürks, Kipchaks, Khazars, Wusun, Kangju, Türgesh.	Old Turkic
3	Khazar Khaganate	650–969	Samandar, Atil	Western Kazakhstan, coast of Volga, Northern Caucasia, Crimea	Khazars, Bulgars, Alans, Hungarians, Burtas, East Slavs	Khazarian
4	Pechenegs	659–750		Saryarka	Pechenegs	Old Turkic
5	Turgesh Khaganate	699–766	Suyab	Zhetysu Region	Göktürks	Old Turkic
6	Oghuz Yabgu State	750–1055	Yangikent	Western Kazakhstan, coast of Aral Sea	Oghuz	Turkic
7	Karluk Yabghu	756–840	Suyab, Balasagun	Zhetysu Region, Southern Kazakhstan	Karluks	Karluk
8	Kara-Khanid Khanate	840–1212	Balasagun	Zhetysu Region, Eastern Turkestan, Transoxiana	Karakhanids, Karluks	Karluk
9	Kimek–Kipchak confederation	880–1035	Imekia, Karantia or Khagan-Kimek	Saryarka	Kimaks, Kipchaks	Turkic
10	Cumania	10th century–1241	Sarai	Kazakhstan, coast of Volga, Crimea	Cumans, Kipchaks	Cuman, Kipchak
11	Karluks	960–1224	Koyluk	Zhetysu Region	Karluks	Karluk
12	Khwarazmian Empire	1077–1231	Konye-Urgench	Southern Kazakhstan, Transoxiana, Khorasan, Iran	Cumans, Persians, Turkmens	Karluk
13	Kara-Khitan Khanate	1124–1218	Balasagun	Zhetysu Region, Eastern Turkestan, Transoxiana	Karluks, Khitans	Karluk
14	Naiman Khanate	1210–1218	Balasagun	Zhetysu Region	Naimans	Karluk
15	Golden Horde	1225–1502	Sarai, Sighnaq	Kazakhstan, Central Asia, coast of Aral Sea, coast of Volga, Crimea	Mongols, Cumans, Kipchaks	Middle Mongol, Kipchak Turkic
