= Musa Yabghu =

Turkish statesman of the Seljuk dynasty

Mu'izz al-Dawla; Amir al-Mu'minin; Musa Yabghu
- معز الدولة موسي
- Era: The Middle Ages
- Children: Abu Ali Hassan ibn Musa; Yusuf ibn Musa
- Father: Seljuk Bey
- Family: Seljuk dynasty

Musa Yabghu (Bayḡu in some sources) or Musa Ibn Seljuk was a Turkish ruler from the Seljuk family and one of the four sons of Seljuk Bey. His brother Arslan Yabghu wanted to lead the family when he was captured by the Ghaznavids, but was overshadowed by his nephews Tughril and Chaghri, who took charge of eastern affairs in the family council that met after the Battle of Dandanaqan. His son Hasan (Abu Ali Hassan) Bey was killed by the Georgians in an operation in eastern Anatolia in 1047..

He had another son named Yusuf, who was appointed the leader of the Seljuks of Arslan Isra'il by Ali-Tegin after the latter was imprisoned in 1025. Yusuf adopted the title inanch-yabugu' and received the control of Nur. However, he was killed by Alp-Qara, an emir of Ali Tegin upon his orders.

Persian sources indicate that during his long life he was involved in a series of conflicts between the Seljuks and the Ghaznavids, and after the Battle of Dandanaqan and during the division of lands between the Seljuq dynasty, Herat, Bost, Sistan and their surrounding areas were handed over to him. Musa traveled to Sistan in 1040 AD (432 AH) and 1042 AD (434 AH) respectively, each time returning to Khorasan after a short stop in that region. His third trip to Sistan in 1051 AD (443 AH) coincided with the Ghaznavid invasions to occupy and destroy it. He captured Zaranj in this year, but retreated to Herat as a result of violent attacks by the Ghaznavids. In 1053 AD (445 AH), he settled in the citadel of General Sistan, and during the reign of Tughrul, the areas ruled by Musa expanded and he obtained the titles of "Mu'izz al-Dawla Musa" (Arabic: معز الدولة موسي) and Amir al-Mu'minin. But later, he rebelled during the time of Alp Arslan, but he was defeated and brought to him. Alp Arslan did not punish him and was content to be close to him.

Details about the last years of his life are not known. But he died after 1064.

== See also ==
- Battle of Dandanaqan
