= Alp Arslan =

Sultan of the Seljuk Empire from 1063 to 1072

- Sultan al-Muazzam Shahanshah; Exalted Sultan; Malik of Islam; Father of Conquests; Father of Courage; Sultan of the Muslim Lands
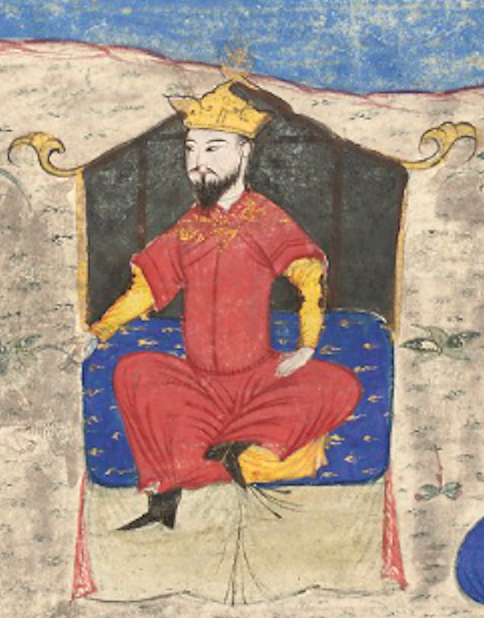
- Miniature from the Majma al-Tawarikh by Hafiz Abru circa 1425; which depicts accession to the throne by Alp Arslan

Sultan of the Seljuk Empire
- Reign: 4 October 1063 – 15 December 1072
- Predecessor: Tughril I
- Successor: Malik-Shah I
- Born: 20 January 1029 (1 Muharram 420 AH)
- Died: 24 November 1072 (aged 43) (10 Rabiʻ I 465 AH); Barzam Fortress, near Amu Darya, Khwarezm
- Spouse: Safariyya Khatun; Akka Khatun; Shah Khatun; Ummu Hifchaq
- Issue: Malik-Shah I; Tutush I; Bori-Bars; Ayaz; Toghan-Shah; Arslan-Shah; Tekish; Sifri Khatun; Aisha Khatun; Zulaikha Khatun; Sara Khatun; Others two daughters
- Dynasty: Seljuk Dynasty
- Father: Chaghri Beg
- Religion: Sunni Islam

Alp Arslan (Persian: آلپ ارسلان; full name: Muhammad Alp Arslan bin Dawud Chaghri) (20 January 1029 – 24 November 1072) was the son of Chaghri Beg, a co-founder of the Seljuk Empire. In 1063, he defeated his rivals to ascend the throne, ruling as the Seljuk sultan until his death in 1072. He had previously served as the Seljuk malik of Khorasan from 1060 to 1063. Renowned for his justice, great military leadership and prowess as a warrior, Alp Arslan earned such epithets as Sultan al-Adil (The Just Sultan), Abu'l Feth (Father of Conquests), Sultan al-Azam (Greatest Sultan), Abu Shuja (Father of Courage), and Adud al-Dawla (Protector of the State). Additionally, due to the vastness of the territories he ruled, he was also known as Sultan al-Alem (Sultan of the World). Alp Arslan greatly expanded Seljuk territories and consolidated his power, defeating rivals to the south, east, and northwest.

== Birth and early life ==
Zahir al-Din Nishapuri, al-Husaini al-Yazidi, Mirkhvand, Khvandamir and Hasan-i Yazdi record Alp Arslan's date of birth as January 10, 1030 while Bundari, Ibn Khallikan and Ibn al-Adim record it as 1032-1033. The 12th century historian Ibn al-Athir also records the date as 1032-1033 but mentions January 20, 1029 as an alternative account. The literature generally accepts the alternative date of January 20, 1029 provided by Ibn al-Athir because the 1032-1033 timeline does not chronologically align with the known facts of Alp Arslan's life. Alp Arslan grew up under the harsh conditions of the empire's foundation period as the son of Khorasan Malik Chaghri Beg who was one of the founders of the Great Seljuk Empire and the nephew of the Seljuk Sultan Tughril I. Following the Battle of Dandanaqan, Alp Arslan entered the service of Tughril at a young age during the Council of Merv. During his approximately three years in this duty Alp Arslan succeeded in becoming a respected figure whose counsel was heeded even in important and complex empire affairs.

== Campaigns and battles ==
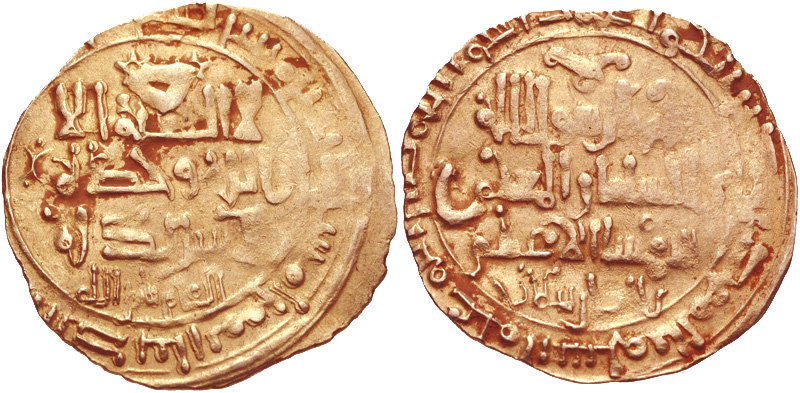
Coin minted in the name of Alp Arslan with the title Shahanshah

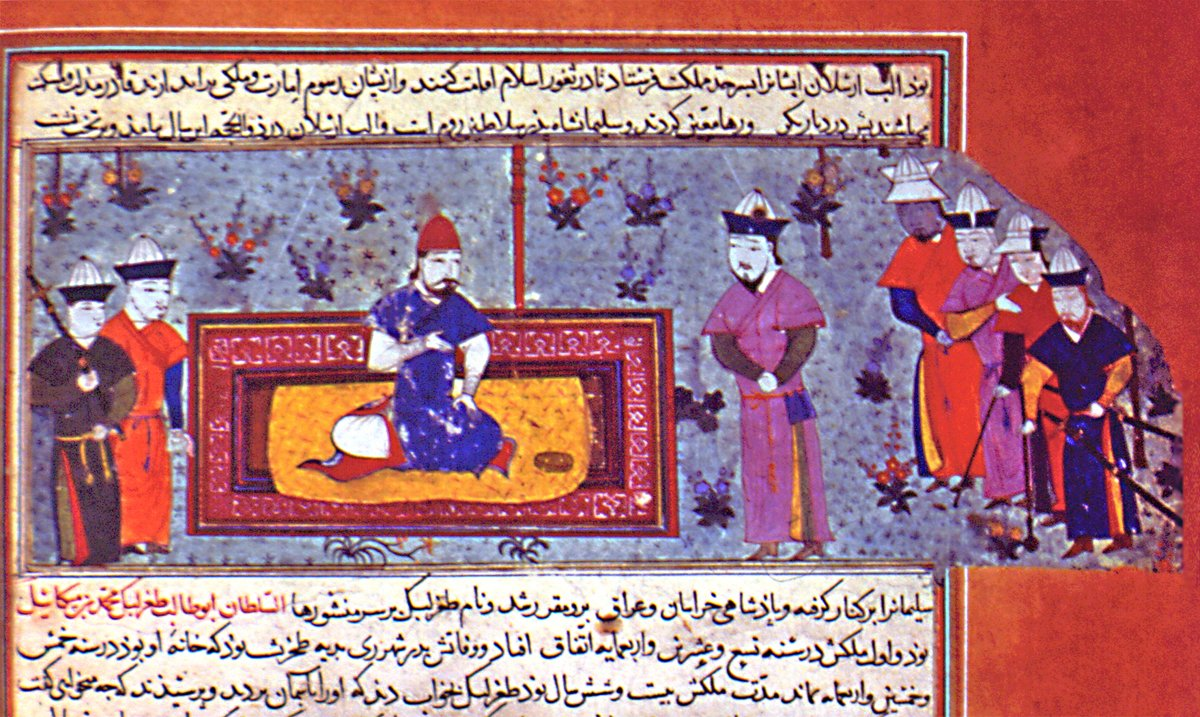
A miniature depicting Alp Arslan. Rashid al-Din, Jami' al-tawarikh, 1654 Ottoman copy, Topkapi Museum.

Alp Arslan accompanied his uncle Tughril on campaigns in the south against the Fatimids, while his father Chaghri remained in Khorasan. Upon Alp Arslan's return to Khorasan, he began his work in administration at his father's suggestion. While there, his father introduced him to Nizam al-Mulk, one of the most eminent statesmen in early Muslim history and Alp Arslan's future vizier.

=== Defense of Tokharistan (1043–44) ===
After the Khwarazm campaign he undertook alongside Tughril, Chaghri Beg launched another expedition against the Ghaznavids. He besieged the city of Herat, which had fallen out of Musa Yabghu's control following a Ghaznavid attack. However, he fell ill after a while and was forced to lift the siege. Meanwhile, although the Ghaznavid army under the command of Sultan Mawdud launched another offensive and achieved some success, they were routed by the Seljuk army commanded by Malik Ertash, and the Seljuks captured Herat through a counterattack. Another the Ghaznavid army under the command of Sultan Mawdud attack was repelled by Malik Alp Arslan, who was stationed in Balkh. Due to his illness, Chaghri Beg was unable to command the battles against the Ghaznavids. Therefore, he appointed his son, Alp Arslan, in his place. Taking action, Alp Arslan defeated the Ghaznavids. Later, the Seljuk army, which launched an attack under the command of Alp Arslan and Chaghri Beg, captured the cities of Termez, Kubadhiyan, Vakhsh, Kunduz (Valvalic), held by the Ghaznavids, and other Tokharistan lands held by the Ghaznavids.

=== First Campaign against the Kara-Khanids ===
Ghaznavid Sultan Mawdud attacked Seljuk territories in 1043–44 and returned to his country defeated in the struggle he had started. After this defeat, he decided to attack the Seljuks once again. This time, instead of attacking alone, he began searching for allies for his campaign against the Seljuks. To this end, he proposed an alliance to the Kara-Khanid ruler Arslan Khan (Ibrahim ibn Nasr) and the Buyid Emir Abu Kalijar. These two rulers accepted Ghaznavid Sultan Mawdud's alliance offer and mobilized their armies in 1048–49. The Seljuks, meanwhile, were occupied with defense preparations against the enemy armies. Chaghri Beg was at the head of these defense preparations. The army that had departed from Ghazni was forced to turn back due to Sultan Mawdud falling ill. Taking advantage of this allied attack, the Seljuk governor of Khwarezm rebelled. Chaghri Beg had to launch a campaign to Khwarezm; he arrived in Urgench and suppressed the rebellion. The Kipchaks, who were supporters of the Ghaznavids, also took advantage of this situation and attacked Khwarezm. Upon the Kipchaks' attack on Khwarezm, Chaghri Beg dispatched an army against them. The Seljuk army sent by Chaghri Beg fought the Kipchak army commanded by Haşaka near Urgench and defeated the Kipchaks. Another allied army, the Buyids, suffered heavy losses on the desert route they had taken. Thus, the Ghaznavids and the Buyids returned to their lands without entering into any struggle with the Seljuks. Unaware of the events that had befallen the Buyids and Ghaznavids, Arslan Khan entered Seljuk territory with his army and occupied Termez. Having conquered Termez, Arslan Khan turned his route toward Balkh and marched forth. Upon receiving the news that Arslan Khan had attacked Seljuk lands, Alp Arslan marched against Arslan Khan with his army. Alp Arslan emerged victorious in the battle that took place between the two armies. Arslan Khan, on the other hand, crossed the Amu Darya river and retreated to Bukhara. Later, Arslan Khan made a peace offer to Chaghri Beg, and as a result of this request, Chaghri Beg accepted the peace proposal. A peace treaty was signed between the two parties.

=== First Campaign in Fars ===
In 1050, Sultan Tughril launched a campaign against the Buyids. Isfahan, which belonged to the Buyids, was besieged, and military expeditions were organized against the Fars province, which was under Buyid rule. One of the Seljuk commanders who led a campaign into the Fars province was Malik Alp Arslan. Alp Arslan conducted this expedition in complete secrecy from everyone. While his uncle, Sultan Tughril, was preoccupied with the siege of Isfahan, Alp Arslan secretly departed from the city of Merv in the Khorasan province and attacked the Buyid-controlled Fars province. Conquering a large part of the Fars province Alp Arslan also captured the Buyid city of Fasa located within this province, taking 3,000 prisoners. Following these successes, Alp Arslan swiftly returned to Khorasan to avoid receiving any orders from his uncle, Sultan Tughril, who was completely unaware of his presence in the Fars province.

=== Defense of Khorasan (1053) ===
By the order of Sultan Abd al-Rashid, the Ghaznavid Emir Toghrul Bozan attacked Sistan, which was under Seljuk rule. Musa Yabghu, who was stationed in Sistan, was defeated by the Ghaznavid Emir Toghrul Bozan and abandoned Sistan, retreating to Herat. Having raised a new army in Herat, Musa Yabghu marched against the Ghaznavids occupying Sistan, accompanied by his son Böri (Kara Arslan) and his vizier Abu'l-Fazl. Upon receiving news that Musa Yabghu was advancing on Sistan with a new army, the Ghaznavid Emir Toghrul Bozan abandoned the region and returned to Ghazni. Arriving in Ghazni, Emir Toghrul Bozan rebelled against Sultan Abd al-Rashid with the intention of usurping the throne. Successful in his rebellion, Emir Toghrul Bozan overthrew Sultan Abd ur-Rashid and seized power. Reacting to this usurpation by Emir Toghrul, Kirghiz, one of the Ghaznavid commanders, killed Emir Toghrul and placed Farrukh-Zad from the Sabuktigin Dynasty on the throne in his stead. Taking advantage of the internal turmoil caused by this civil war within the Ghaznavid Empire, the Seljuks, under the leadership of Chaghri Beg, launched a campaign against the Ghaznavids and advanced as far as Bost. Sultan Farrukh-Zad dispatched his commander Kirghiz against Chaghri Beg, who had reached Bost. In the battle that took place near Bost, Chaghri Beg was defeated and forced to retreat. Later, acting on Sultan Farrukh-Zad's orders commander Kirghiz attacked Seljuk territories, defeating the Seljuk army under the command of Atabeg Gul-Sarigh as well as other Seljuk forces he clashed with, and took their commanders captive. Faced with this dire situation for the Seljuks, Malik Alp Arslan sought permission from his father, Chaghri Beg, to launch an attack on the Ghaznavids. Chaghri Beg responded favorably to his son Alp Arslan's request. Having obtained his father's permission, Alp Arslan marched against the Ghaznavids with his army. In the ensuing battle between the two sides, Alp Arslan routed the Ghaznavid forces commanded by Kirghiz. Following this battle, a prisoner exchange took place between the two sides, and a peace treaty was signed.

=== Rebellion of Ibrahim Inal and the Battle of Rey (1059) ===
Following his Baghdad campaign in 1055, Sultan Tughril wanted to launch an expedition against the Buyid commander Arslan al-Basasiri. However, when Malik Resultegin, the brother of Qutalmish, rebelled, Sultan Tughril became occupied with suppressing the uprising. Resultegin was taken prisoner after the rebellion was crushed. At the request of Caliph Al-Qa'im, Sultan Tughril pardoned him. After the suppression of Resultegin's rebellion, rumors spread that the Governor of Mosul, Malik Ibrahim Inal, was also planning to rebel. According to the news reaching Baghdad, Ibrahim Inal had left Mosul and headed to the Jibal region, and some Turkmens had followed him there. As soon as Sultan Tughril, who was in Baghdad, received this news, he dispatched one of his commanders, Savtegin, to Malik Ibrahim Inal as an envoy bearing valuable gifts. Savtegin presented these gifts to Malik Ibrahim Inal and also conveyed the sultan's orders for him to come to Baghdad. Ibrahim Inal went to Baghdad following the sultan's orders, and Emir Aytekin, Emir Erdem, Emir Yaruktekin, and Hajib Boritekin were appointed to the military commands of Northern Iraq in his place. Seizing the opportunity created by Ibrahim Inal's departure and the reduced number of troops in the region, the Buyid commander Arslan al-Basasiri attacked and captured Mosul. Upon hearing that Mosul had fallen to the Buyids, Sultan Tughril launched a second expedition against the city. However, when Arslan al-Basasiri learned of Sultan Tughril's approach, he inflicted damage on the city and abandoned it. Determined to pursue Arslan al-Basasiri, Sultan Tughril continued his advance and reached as far as Nusaybin. When Sultan Tughril arrived in Nusaybin, Ibrahim Inal, having secured the backing of the Fatimids and Arslan al-Basasiri, marched with his troops to the city of Hamadan, which housed the Seljuk arsenals and treasuries. Upon learning that Ibrahim Inal was heading to Hamadan, Sultan Tughril abandoned his pursuit of al-Basasiri and dispatched a portion of his troops to Baghdad to defend against a potential Buyid attack. He then mobilized with a small number of soldiers and reached Hamadan before Ibrahim Inal. Ibrahim Inal's army grew in size when his nephews, Mehmed and Ahmed (the sons of Malik Ertash), arrived with their troops to support him. He clashed with Sultan Tughril near Hamadan and defeated him. Following his defeat, Sultan Tughril retreated to the fortress of Hamadan. In the wake of his victory, Ibrahim Inal laid siege to the fortress where Sultan Tughril had taken refuge. Finding himself in a dire situation, Sultan Tughril sent message to request aid from his wife Altun Jan Khatun and his Vizier al-Kunduri in Baghdad, as well as his brother Chaghri Beg in Khorasan. The predicament facing Sultan Tughril and the news that Arslan al-Basasiri was marching on Baghdad with Fatimid support sparked chaos in the city. Although Vizier Al-Kunduri wanted to install Sultan Tughril's stepson Anushirvan as sultan, Altun Jan Khatun refused to allow it. She imprisoned her son Anushirvan and issued an arrest warrant for Vizier Al-Kunduri. Altun Jan Khatun then set out for Hamadan with the soldiers stationed in Baghdad. Meanwhile, the Turkmens abandoned the siege of the fortress of Hamadan to loot the treasury. Seizing this opportunity, the besieged Sultan Tughril left the city and made his way to the capital, Rey. Sultan Tughril's forces were reinforced when his nephews Alp Arslan, Qavurt, and Yakuti arrived to support him. Ibrahim Inal pursued Sultan Tughril and also arrived at Rey with his army. The two armies clashed near Rey on 3 August 1059 and the rebellious Malik Ibrahim Inal and his forces were decisively defeated. The defeated Ibrahim Inal, Ahmed, and Mehmed were personally taken prisoner by Malik Alp Arslan. Following the battle near Rey, Malik Alp Arslan handed his captives Ibrahim Inal, Mehmed, and Ahmed over to his uncle, Sultan Tughril. Sultan Tughril did not pardon his rebellious brother Ibrahim Inal this time, as his final attempt at rebellion had caused a grave danger. He also refused to pardon Ahmed and Mehmed, and in accordance with old Turk traditions, he had all three of them strangled with a bowstring.

=== Second Campaign against the Kara-Khanids (1059) ===
In 1059, Chaghri Beg, the Seljuk Malik of Khorasan, died and was succeeded by his son, Alp Arslan. During his years as the Malik of Khorasan, he invaded Kara-Khanid territories and plundered many cities. Alp Arslan launched his first attack on Kara-Khanid lands in 1059. He conquered Khuttal and Chaghaniyan, which were under Kara-Khanid rule, and began organizing campaigns into Kara-Khanid territory via these two cities. Struggling against Alp Arslan's attacks, the Kara-Khanid ruler Tamghach Khan Ibrahim sent envoys to Baghdad in 1061. Through this envoys, he complained about Alp Arslan to the Abbasid Caliph Al-Qa'im bi-amri 'llāh in Baghdad. In response to Tamghach Khan's request, the Caliph could only grant him khilat and epithet. However, the Caliph was unable to do anything to stop Alp Arslan. Additionally, Alp Arslan conquered Bukhara during one of his campaigns against the Kara-Khanids. Following the conquest of Bukhara, he had a fetihname (declaration of victory) written.

=== Campaign in Khuttal (1063) ===
After the death of Tughril I, Suleiman (the son of Chaghri Beg), who ascended to the throne, could not establish full dominance over the empire. Maliks such as Qutalmish, Alp Arslan, and Musa Yabghu did not recognize Suleiman as sultan. Alp Arslan and Qutalmish took action against Suleiman and initiated a struggle for the throne. Qutalmish besieged Rey with an army of 50,000 to 90,000 men. Taking advantage of these internal conflicts, the emirs of Khuttal and Chaghaniyan rebelled, and Musa Yabghu occupied Herat, which was under Alp Arslan's rule. Before advancing westward for the throne, Alp Arslan set out to suppress these local emirs and Musa Yabghu's rebellions. He first attacked Khuttal, laying siege to Hulbuk Castle (also known as Cilan), where the Emir of Khuttal was stationed. This castle was situated on top of a mountain and was a heavily fortified stronghold. Initial attacks yielded no results. However, when Alp Arslan personally joined the battle, the soldiers began to fight with greater zeal, and the castle was captured. Alp Arslan appointed one of his own men as the emir of the castle. Having suppressed the Huttal rebellion, Alp Arslan moved to crush the rebellion of his older uncle Musa Yabghu, who had occupied Herat and laid claim to the throne.

=== Battle of Herat (1063) ===
Following the death of Sultan Tughril in 1063, several rebellions broke out across the Seljuk territories. One of these was the rebellion of Musa Yabghu. Claiming a right to the throne, Musa Yabghu rebelled and captured the city of Herat which was under the dominion of Malik Alp Arslan. At that time, Alp Arslan was occupied with suppressing the rebellion of the Emir of Khuttal. After putting down the Khuttal emir's uprising, he marched against Musa Yabghu. When Alp Arslan and his army arrived in Herat, Musa Yabghu also mobilized. Musa Yabghu marched with his army against the forces of Alp Arslan. A pitched battle that lasted day and night was fought between the two sides near Herat. Alp Arslan defeated Musa Yabghu's army and took Musa Yabghu prisoner. He treated his captive great uncle, Musa Yabghu, with compassion and showed him respect. Additionally, in 1063, Malik Alp Arslan captured Zaranj, which was under the dominion of Musa Yabghu. In the following years, he put an end to Musa Yabghu's political dominance.

=== Campaign in Chaghaniyan ===
Suleiman, who ascended the throne after Sultan Tughril, could not establish full dominion over the country, and maliks such as Alp Arslan, Qutalmish, and Musa Yabghu refused to recognize him as sultan. In fact, Alp Arslan declared himself sultan and had the khutbah read in his name both in the territories he ruled and in other cities. Qutalmish, meanwhile, raised an army of 50,000-90.000 troops and marched to wage war against Suleiman. Musa Yabghu, for his part, occupied Herat, which was under Alp Arslan's control. Taking advantage of the internal turmoil caused by these disruptive events unfolding across Seljuk lands, some emirs rebelled. One of these emirs was Emir Musa, the governor of Chaghaniyan. Sultan Alp Arslan marched against this rebellious emir after first bringing Musa Yabghu into submission. Alp Arslan arrived before Chaghaniyan with his army and laid siege to this fortified stronghold. Situated in a mountainous region, Chaghaniyan was highly defensible thanks to its massive castle. Launching an assault, Alp Arslan captured Chaghaniyan. The governor of Chaghaniyan, Emir Musa, was taken captive and executed by Alp Arslan's order. Having suppressed the Chaghaniyan rebellion, Alp Arslan set out from there toward Rey, the capital of the Great Seljuk Empire.

=== Battle of Damghan and Alp Arslan's accession to the throne ===
Before the death of Sultan Tughril, Qutalmish had rebelled. Qutalmish, who had made the Gerdkuh fortress near Damghan as his headquarters, was besieged there by Vizier Al-Kunduri. However, upon the death of Sultan Tughril, Al-Kunduri abandoned the siege and went to Rey. In Rey, al-Kunduri declared Chaghri Beg's son Suleiman as sultan and made great efforts to establish Suleiman's authority throughout the country. He even sent an envoy to Malik Alp Arslan, to inform him of Sultan Tughril's death, delivering an ultimatum demanding that he accept Suleiman's authority. Alp Arslan ignored Al-Kunduri's threats, declared himself sultan, and mobilized to seize the throne. Meanwhile, Qutalmish went to the Turkmen tribes and gained their support. With his troop numbers increased by the joining Turkmens, Qutalmish marched his army toward the Seljuk capital, Rey. Al-Kunduri, who engaged Qutalmish in battle near Rey, was defeated and fled back to the city. Following his victory, Qutalmish besieged Rey with his army to secure a decisive triumph. Left in a difficult position, Al-Kunduri and Suleiman sought support but failed to achieve any results. As a last resort, Al-Kunduri asked Alp Arslan for help, deposed Suleiman, and declared Alp Arslan as sultan. Alp Arslan responded positively to Al-Kunduri's request. Having suppressed the rebellions in the eastern part of the Seljuk Empire, Alp Arslan turned his attention westward. Hearing of Alp Arslan's approach, Qutalmish lifted the siege and marched against him. Upon arriving in Damghan, Qutalmish routed the advancing army commanded by Hajib Erdem, a supporter of Alp Arslan. He then proceeded to a place known as the Milh Valley in Damghan, where he had the water dams opened to turn the area into a swamp in order to prevent Alp Arslan's army from crossing. The reason Qutalmish did this was that he considered that specific day to be an inauspicious one for fighting. Alp Arslan, on the other hand, arrived near the Milh Valley with his army of 20,000 men. There was no dry land left, making it seemingly impossible to enter the valley. Taking a risk, Alp Arslan entered the swamp with his army and successfully crossed it. Upon entering the valley, Alp Arslan marched upon Qutalmish. Qutalmish and his supporters experienced great shock when they saw that Alp Arslan and his army had breached the swamp. The two armies engaged in battle in the Milh Valley. Alp Arslan had 20,000 soldiers, while Qutalmish had 50,000-90,000 soldiers. Despite having the numerical advantage, Qutalmish was defeated, and while trying to escape to the Girdkuh fortress to avoid capture, he fell from his horse and died. Qutalmish's remains were buried in a location near the tomb of Sultan Tughril. Qutalmish's brother, Rasul Tegin, and one of his sons were taken prisoner. Having defeated his rivals, Alp Arslan went to Rey and ascended the Seljuk throne. His older brother, Malik Qavurt, who had also mobilized for the throne, returned to Kerman, where he was governor, upon learning that Alp Arslan had taken the throne.

=== Caucasus and Anatolia Expedition (1064) ===
After defeating Qutalmish and ascending to the throne, Alp Arslan restored order within the country and then launched a campaign into Anatolia and the Caucasus. Setting out in 1064, Alp Arslan entered the lands of Azerbaijan, accompanied by his son Malik Malik-Shah, his Vizier Nizam al-Mulk, and the Amid of Khorasan Muhammad bin Mansur. Here, he brought the disobedient cities of Khoy and Salmas back under Seljuk rule. Later, he conquered the Arran region, establishing Seljuk sovereignty over almost all of Azerbaijan. When Sultan Alp Arslan arrived in Azerbaijan, his older brother, Malik Emir Yakuti, and several Turkmen warriors in the region also joined his army. Having increased his number of troops, he advanced to Marand, located northeast of Lake Urmia. Upon his arrival in Marand, Emir Tuğtekin, one of the Seljuk commanders in the region, came to the sultan, provided information about the area, and joined the army. After staying in the city of Marand for a while with his forces, Sultan Alp Arslan moved toward Nakhchivan. When he reached Nakhchivan, he had ships built to cross the Aras river and, using a pontoon bridge constructed from these ships, successfully moved his army across the river. Sultan Alp Arslan then divided his army in two, assigning the command of the second army to his son Malik-Shah with orders to conquer the castles in the region. With the first army under his own command, Alp Arslan initially campaigned against the Armenians; after conquering many territories under their control, he made the Kingdom of Lori a vassal state of the Great Seljuk Empire. Following Lori, Sultan Alp Arslan entered Georgia with his army and conquered the regions of Kangark, Kangarni, and Kartli. After these conquests, the Seljuks attacked and captured Trialeti. While Sultan Alp Arslan was occupied with the assault on Trialeti, his vanguard forces had advanced as far as Kveliskur on the Cek branch of the Kura river. Meanwhile, Alp Arslan entered Anatolia with his army and advanced as far as Şavşat. Upon arriving there, he conquered Tori, Giviskhevi, Şavşat, Tao, and Klarjeti, and pushing further south, reached the Panaskert river and laid siege to the city of Panaskert. Following the battles, Alp Arslan conquered Panaskert and then moved towards Georgia again. Entering Georgia, Sultan Alp Arslan advanced to the regions of Akşehir (Akhalkalaki) in Javakheti. After making conquests in the Javakheti region, he sent word to the army commanded by his son, Malik-Shah. In the meantime, acting on the orders he received from his father, Malik-Shah had set out to conquer certain castles and cities in the area, accompanied by his uncle Emir Yakuti and Vizier Nizam al-Mulk. Advancing along the Aras river, Malik-Shah conquered numerous cities and castles, including Meryemnişin, Sarp Kale, Iğdır, Kulp Kale, Byurakan, Hagios Georgios, Sürmeli Çukuru, Surmari, Van, and the surrounding fortresses. Upon receiving his father's message, he advanced toward Akşehir (Akhalkalaki), capturing several castles along his path. With the arrival of Malik-Shah's forces, the two armies merged, marched on Akşehir (Akhalkalaki), and laid siege to the city. After fierce fighting, Akşehir was conquered. After taking Akşehir, Alp Arslan marched on Sübizşehir. Arriving before Sübizşehir, the Seljuks besieged the city and conquered it following the ensuing battles. Following the fall of Sübizşehir, they advanced on Allahverdi (Al-Lal, Allaverdi). This city was in a highly fortified position, surrounded by mountains with castles perched atop them. Furthermore, a difficult to cross river flowed from south to north through the city. Despite these obstacles, Alp Arslan arrived before the city and began to lay siege. To assault the city, he had a bridge built over the river, and the Seljuk army attacked. Fierce battles took place between the two sides, with the Georgians putting up massive resistance. After some time, two envoys from the city went to the Seljuk headquarters. Appearing before Sultan Alp Arslan, these two envoys begged for quarter and requested soldiers. Responding positively to their request, Sultan Alp Arslan sent an elite unit into the city alongside them. However, when this Seljuk unit entered the walls, they were ambushed by the Georgians. Following a violent clash, the Seljuk unit was annihilated. Afterwards, the Georgians surged out of the city and attacked the Seljuks. Intense combat broke out between the Seljuks and Georgians. At this time, Alp Arslan was praying in his tent, and despite hearing the sounds of the battle, he did not break his prayer. Upon finishing his prayer, Sultan Alp Arslan took to the battlefield, seized control of his army, and routed the Georgians. The routed Georgians fled back into the city, with the pursuing Seljuks entering right behind them. Following a final clash, the city was conquered by the Seljuks, who obtained vast spoils from the victory. After the conquest of Allahverdi, Alp Arslan marched on another nearby castle and conquered it as well. In the wake of these conquests, King Bagrat IV of Georgia sent an envoy to Sultan Alp Arslan requesting a treaty. As a result of this treaty, the Kingdom of Georgia became a vassal of the Great Seljuk Empire. He then set up camp near the Aras river and sent the captured spoils to the Seljuk capital of Rey. From there, Alp Arslan entered Anatolia once again, attacking and conquering Akkent and Ağcakale near Lake Çıldır. Following these victories, he advanced toward the city of Ani. Arriving before Ani, the Seljuk army laid siege to the city. Ani was governed by two Byzantine generals named Duke Bagrat and Grigor, and according to rumors, it was considered impossible to conquer. The city was situated on a rocky peninsula extending over a fast flowing river, further protected by a deep valley to the west. By Sultan Alp Arslan's order, a wooden siege tower was constructed, which was then manned with soldiers and equipped with catapults. Furthermore, according to Ibn al-Athir, realizing that they could not breach the walls conventionally, Sultan Alp Arslan ordered the construction of a large number of battering rams covered with straw, enabling the soldiers to advance inside and attack. Meanwhile, thanks to the efforts of their sapper units, the Seljuks managed to collapse a section of the walls. Following intense siege warfare, the Seljuk army entered the city on August 16th, after a 25-day siege. The Byzantine commanders were taken prisoner by the Seljuk soldiers. An account of the sack and massacres in Ani is given by the historian Sibt ibn al-Jawzi, who quotes an eyewitness saying:

The army entered the city, massacred its inhabitants, pillaged and burned it, leaving it in ruins and taking prisoner all those who remained alive... The dead bodies were so many that they blocked the streets; one could not go anywhere without stepping over them. And the number of prisoners was not less than 50,000 souls. I was determined to enter the city and see the destruction with my own eyes. I tried to find a street in which I would not have to walk over the corpses, but that was impossible.

Hearing that Ani had fallen to the Great Seljuks, King Hayık of Vanand (Gagik II of Kars) invited Sultan Alp Arslan to Kars and pledged to become a vassal of the Great Seljuk Empire. The conquest of the previously deemed impregnable city of Ani by the Great Seljuk Empire caused great astonishment in both the East and the West. Because of the conquest of Ani, the Abbasid Caliph Al-Qa'im praised and congratulated Sultan Alp Arslan, bestowing upon him the title "Abu'l-Feth" (Father of Conquests). Furthermore, Sultan Alp Arslan granted the administration of the territories conquered during the Caucasus and Anatolia Expedition to the vassals who accompanied him on the expedition. Also following this campaign, the Seljuks organized raids into regions located in the southwest of the Byzantine Empire, achieving numerous successes and acquiring a great deal of spoils.

=== Second Campaign in Fars (1065) ===
After returning from his Caucasus and Anatolia campaign, Sultan Alp Arslan stayed in Hamadan for a while. During the Sultan's stay in Hamadan, the Seljuk vassal Emir Fadluya arrived with gifts and appeared before the Sultan. Fadluya's main purpose was to complain to the Sultan about Malik Qavurt, who had occupied the Fars province. Fadluya recounted Qavurt's actions to Sultan Alp Arslan and asked for his help. Not wanting Malik Qavurt to grow more powerful, Sultan Alp Arslan responded favorably to Fadluya's request for assistance. First, he placed soldiers under Fadluya's command. Later, he also dispatched a unit led by a commander named Hezaresb to the Fars province. Deeming these insufficient Sultan Alp Arslan went to Isfahan and advanced toward the Fars province from there. Ultimately, Malik Qavurt was forced to beg for mercy and surrender. After granting the Fars region, which Qavurt had occupied, to the Seljuk vassal Fadluya, Sultan Alp Arslan returned to Isfahan.

=== First Turkestan Expedition (1065) ===
In 1065, following attacks on Seljuk lands and trade caravans by Turkmens not under Seljuk rule, Mongols, and non-Muslim Turks, Sultan Alp Arslan gathered his armies and advanced to the north and east of Turkestan. Sultan Alp Arslan first launched a campaign into the Ustyurt and Mangyshlak regions, where these independent Turkmens, Mongols, and non-Muslim Turks who had been attacking Seljuk territory and harming trade were located. Upon arriving in these regions, Sultan Alp Arslan defeated them, thereby establishing Seljuk sovereignty in these areas. He then continued his forward offensive and marched on the Kipchaks and the Cazıgs. The Kipchaks and Cazıgs were under the rule of a sovereign named Kafşud. Sultan Alp Arslan arrived with his army and battled Kafşud's forces. In the ensuing battle between the two sides, Sultan Alp Arslan defeated Kafşud. The defeated Kafşud was later pardoned by Sultan Alp Arslan once he accepted Seljuk suzerainty. After subjugating Kafşud, the Seljuks continued their advance to the east. After making conquests in Transoxiana, Sultan Alp Arslan went to Jand and visited the tomb of his great-grandfather, Seljuk Beg. He established Seljuk rule in the city of Jend and placed it under the administration of his son, Malik-Shah. Later, returning to Merv, Sultan Alp Arslan went to Radkan and declared his son Malik-Shah as his heir apparent. As a result of this campaign, Sultan Alp Arslan established Seljuk dominance over most of the territories stretching from the Caspian Sea to Tashkent.

=== Kerman and Fars Expedition ===
==== 1067 ====
Sultan Alp Arslan had taken Fars from his older brother Malik Qavurt but did not interfere with the remaining Kerman and Oman territories under Qavurt's rule. Qavurt rebelled against Sultan Alp Arslan in 1067 under the provocation of his vizier by having the khutbah read and coins minted in his own name across his governed regions. Sultan Alp Arslan gathered his army and marched on Kerman upon receiving the news of his older brother's rebellion. Malik Qavurt rallied his army and mobilized after hearing that Sultan Alp Arslan was advancing toward Kerman. Sultan Alp Arslan's forces emerged victorious from the battle fought between the two armies. Qavurt fled to the fortress of Jiroft following this defeat. He later sent an envoy to the sultan to ask for forgiveness after realizing he could not achieve victory against Sultan Alp Arslan. Sultan Alp Arslan pardoned his older brother and left him in his position as the Malik of Kerman. Sultan Alp Arslan marched to Fars upon the subsequent rebellion of Fadluya after suppressing Qavurt's uprising. Sultan Alp Arslan captured all the fortresses in the region after arriving there.

==== 1068 ====
Malik Qavurt formed an alliance with Emir Fadluya and rebelled against Sultan Alp Arslan a second time by taking action once again in 1068. Sultan Alp Arslan mobilized his army as soon as he received news of the uprisings. Alp Arslan first marched against Fadluya. He later marched against Qavurt after assigning Nizam al-Mulk the task of capturing Fadluya who had taken refuge in the fortress of Kurşeh. Qavurt was located in the fortified castle of Bardasir at this time. Sultan Alp Arslan entered Kerman territory and advanced to Bardasir. He laid siege to the fortress upon arriving before the city. Nizam al-Mulk captured Fadluya while the siege of Bardasir was ongoing. The captive Fadluya was pardoned by Sultan Alp Arslan. Qavurt also begged the Sultan for a pardon upon hearing that Fadluya had been forgiven. His real goal however was merely to buy time. Qavurt was planning to launch a surprise attack by conspiring with a faction within Sultan Alp Arslan's army. Sultan Alp Arslan had the collaborators executed after becoming aware of this plot. He besieged Bardasir for a while longer before handing over the command of the siege to his son Malik-Shah and departing for Isfahan. Sultan Alp Arslan then demanded the surrender of the Sultan-Shah who had originally caused Qavurt to rebel. Qavurt rejected this demand. Sultan Alp Arslan thereupon confiscated a certain portion of the territories that were under Qavurt's sovereignty.

=== Campaign in Georgia (1068) ===
Bagrat IV agreed to pay jizya to the Seljuks in 1064, but the Georgians broke the agreement in 1065. Alp Arslan invaded Georgia again in 1068. He captured Tbilisi, Kartli, Shirak, Vanand, Gugark, Arran, Ganja, and Kars after a short battle and obtained the submission of Bagrat IV. However, the Georgians were liberated from Seljuk rule around 1073–1074 after Alp Arslan died. As a result of the campaigns carried out during the reign of Malik-Shah I, Georgia became a part of the Seljuk Empire again.

=== Campaign in Northern Syria and Anatolia ===
In 1070, the emirs of Mecca and Medina came under the rule of the Seljuk Empire. After Mecca and Medina came under Seljuk Empire rule, the Fatimid Vizier Nasr-Dawla asked for help from Alp Arslan against the Fatimids. Alp Arslan moved with his army upon the call for help and entered Anatolia via Azerbaijan. Alp Arslan first captured the castles of Manzikert and Erciş. Later, he went down to the Silvan and Diyarbekir (Amid) regions and made the emirs there his vassals of Seljuk Empire, then he went to Edessa and besieged the city. When the siege was prolonged, he lifted the siege by receiving a tribute of 50,000 dinars. After leaving Edessa, Alp Arslan crossed the Euphrates. Paul M. Cobb relates that a messenger from Cairo who accompanied the sultan remarked on the significance of the crossing, telling him: "This river has never before been crossed by a Turk except those who were slaves. But you today have crossed it as a king." Afterwards he advanced to Aleppo, which was in the hands of the Mirdasids, and captured the Byzantine castles on his way. When he arrived in Aleppo, he laid siege to the city due to the disobedience of Rashid al-Dawla Mahmud, the Mirdasid emir of Aleppo. Some time after the siege, Rashid al-Dawla Mahmud came to Alp Arslan, apologized, and became his vassal. Later, as Egypt was preparing to advance, the Byzantine envoy arrived and Alp Arslan turned his attention to Manzikert.

=== Battle of Manzikert (1071) ===
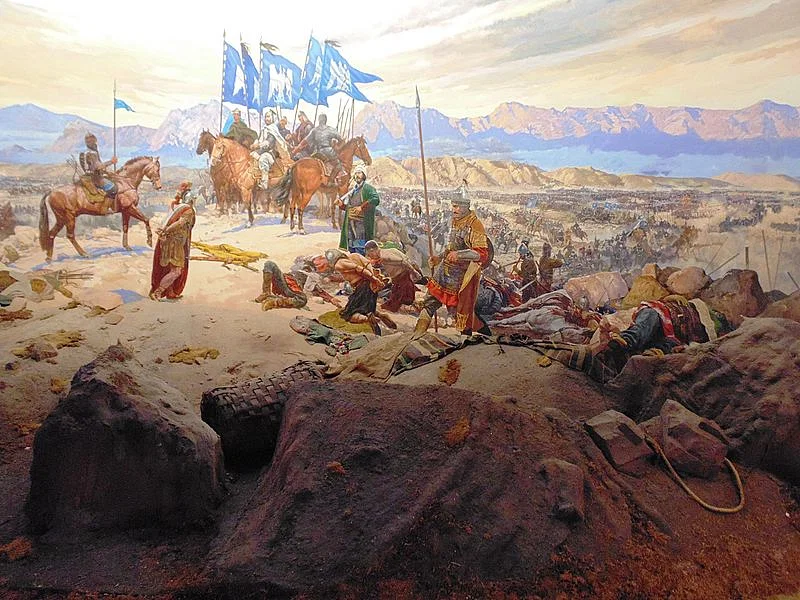
A painting depicting the Battle of Manzikert (Istanbul Military Museum)

In 1071, Romanos took the field again and advanced east with his army, including a contingent of Cuman Turks as well as contingents of Franks and Normans, under Ursel de Baieul. Alp Arslan, who had moved his troops south to fight the Fatimids, quickly reversed to meet the Byzantines. When Alp Arslan arrived in Silvan and learned that Romanos Diogenes had captured Manzikert, he set out towards Ahlat. The two armies met at the Rahve Plain near Manzikert. Alp Arslan sent a final ambassador to the Romanos IV Diogenes, offering a peace deal. The Romanos IV Diogenes rejected the peace deal, whereupon Alp Arslan put his army in battle formation and placed some of his cavalry in ambush along the valley. Alp Arslan placed the 4,000-man force he would command in the center line. On the Byzantine side, Emperor Romanos Diogenes also put his army in battle formation. Both armies made their final preparations on 25 August. Before the battle on 26 August, Alp Arslan gave the following speech to his army:

I want to attack the enemy at this hour when Muslims are praying for us in mosques. If we win, the result we desire will be achieved, if we are defeated, we will go to heaven as martyrs. Today, there is neither a sultan giving orders nor a soldier taking orders; I will fight with you as one of you; those who want to come with me can follow me, those who do not want to can freely return.

On 26 August, the Battle of Manzikert began with a Seljuk attack. The central army, under the command of Alp Arslan, attacked the numerically superior Byzantine army and, after a while, retreated due to war tactics. The central army, led by the Byzantine emperor Romanus Diogenes, started to follow the Seljuk army, and when they reached the ambush point, the army under the command of Alp Arslan turned towards the Byzantine army and other Seljuk soldiers emerged from the hills where they were hiding and surrounded the Byzantine army. The Byzantine army, which fell into the ambush set by the Seljuks, was defeated and for the first time in history, a Byzantine emperor was taken prisoner by a Turkish and Muslim commander. The Byzantines were wholly routed.

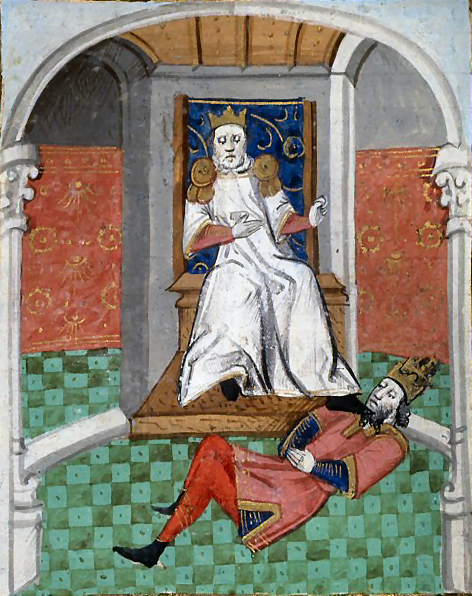
Alp Arslan humiliating Romanos IV. From a 15th-century illustrated French translation of Boccaccio's De casibus virorum illustrium.

When Romanos was conducted into the presence of Alp Arslan, the Sultan refused to believe that the bloodied and tattered man covered in dirt was the mighty Emperor of the Romans. After discovering his identity, Alp Arslan placed his boot on the emperor's neck and forced him to kiss the ground, a traditional symbolic gesture at the time. Alp Arslan then treated Romanos with considerable kindness and again offered the terms of peace that he had offered before the battle.

According to Ibn al-Adim, in the presence of Arslan, Romanos blamed the raids of Rashid al-Dawla Mahmud into Byzantine territory for his interventions in Muslim territories which eventually led to the Battle of Manzikert. Romanos remained a captive of the Sultan for a week. During this time, the Sultan allowed Romanos to eat at his table while concessions were agreed upon: Antioch, Edessa, Hierapolis, and Manzikert were to be surrendered. This would have left the vital core of Anatolia untouched. A payment of 10 million gold pieces demanded by the Sultan as a ransom for Romanos was deemed as too high by the latter, so the Sultan reduced its short-term expense by asking for 1.5 million gold pieces as an initial payment instead, followed by an annual sum of 360,000 gold pieces. Plus, a marriage alliance was prepared between Alp Arslan's son and Romanos’ daughter. The Sultan then gave Romanos many presents and an escort of two emirs and one hundred Mamluks on his route to Constantinople.

Shortly after his return to his subjects, Romanos found his rule in serious trouble. Despite attempts to raise loyal troops, he was defeated three times in battle against the Doukas family and was deposed, blinded, and exiled to the island of Proti. He died soon after due to an infection caused by his brutal blinding. Romanos' final foray into the Anatolian heartland, which he had worked so hard to defend, was a public humiliation.

After hearing of the death of Byzantine Emperor Romanos IV Diogenes, Sultan Alp Arslan pledged: "The Byzantine nation has no God, so this day the oath of peace and friendship taken by both the Persians and Byzantines is nullified; henceforth I shall consume with the sword all those people who venerate the cross, and all the lands of the Christians shall be enslaved."

Alp Arslan and his successor Malik Shah urged Turkish tribes to invade and settle Anatolia, where they would not only cease to be a problem for the Seljuk Sultanate, but also extend its territory further. Alp Arslan commanded the Turks as follows:

Henceforth all of you be like lion cubs and eagle young, racing through the countryside day and night, slaying the Christians and not sparing any mercy on the Roman nation.

Alp Arslan's victories changed the balance in western Asia completely in favor of the Seljuq Turks and Sunni Muslims. While the Byzantine Empire was to continue for nearly four more centuries, the victory at Manzikert signalled the beginning of Turkic ascendancy in Anatolia. The victory at Manzikert became so popular among the Turks that later every noble family in Anatolia claimed to have had an ancestor who had fought on that day.

=== Second Turkestan Expedition (1072) ===
Alp Arslan launched an expedition to Turkestan in 1072 with an army of 200,000. The reason for this expedition was that the Seljuk Dynasty's son-in-law, Shams al-Mulk, killed his wife, Alp Arslan's daughter (though some sources say she was his sister). Alp Arslan had ships built to cross the Amu Darya River with his army. Alp Arslan and his army crossed the Amu Darya River with the help of ships in 24 days. Later, Alp Arslan entered the Kara-Khanid lands with his army. Alp Arslan and his army came to the front of Barzem Castle without encountering any resistance or attacks and surrounded the castle. After a while, the castle, unable to withstand the siege, surrendered. The castle commander Yusuf al-Kharezmi came to Alp Arslan, stabbed him, and seriously wounded him. Alp Arslan held out for four days, but then died.

== State organization ==
Alp Arslan's strength lay in the military realm. Domestic affairs were handled by his able vizier, Nizam al-Mulk, the founder of the administrative organization that characterized and strengthened the sultanate during the reigns of Alp Arslan and his son, Malik Shah. Military iqtas, governed by Seljuq princes, were established to provide support for the soldiery and to accommodate the nomadic Turks to the established Anatolian agricultural scene. This type of military fiefdom enabled the nomadic Turks to draw on the resources of the sedentary Persians, Turks, and other established cultures within the Seljuq realm, and allowed Alp Arslan to field a huge standing army without depending on tribute from conquest to pay his soldiers. He not only had enough food from his subjects to maintain his military, but the taxes collected from traders and merchants added to his coffers sufficiently to fund his continuous wars.

Suleiman ibn Qutalmish was the son of the contender for Arslan's throne; he was appointed governor of the north-western provinces and assigned to complete the invasion of Anatolia. An explanation for this choice can only be conjectured from Ibn al-Athir's account of the battle between Alp Arslan and Kutalmish, in which he writes that Alp Arslan wept for the latter's death and greatly mourned the loss of his kinsman.

== Character ==
Sultan Alp Arslan was a deeply religious, merciful, compassionate, brave, just, powerful, and majestic figure. He was highly meticulous in the implementation of religious decrees, having mosques built in the non Muslim territories he conquered. He was fiercely devoted to his religion, Islam, and to Jihad. Furthermore, he believed that the very existence and sovereignty of the Seljuk Empire depended on the triumphs of Sunni Islam, thus maintaining a strict stance against Shia Islam. Due to his religious devoutness, he was regarded as a wali among the people. Moreover, it is said that he would give money to the poor at his palace, having food distributed to them and 50 sheep slaughtered for them every single day. Muslim sources show Alp Arslan as fanatically pious but just. Alp Arslan was so dedicated to the Hanafi school of Islamic jurisprudence that he always kept a qadi by his side, including in battles. Demonstrating his strong adherence to Sunni Islam, Alp Arslan's court was routinely filled with men of religion. His retinue included notable Hanafi imams such as Mushattab b. Muhammad al-Farghani and 'Abd al-Malik al-Bukhari al-Hanafi, the latter of whom served as his personal imam and accompanied him into battle. His vizier, Nizam al-Mulk, described the young sultan in his Book of Government:

He was exceedingly imperious and awe-inspiring and, because he was so earnest and fanatical in his beliefs and disapproved of the Shafi'i rite, I lived in constant fear of him.

Moreover, the Alp Arslan's stance towards the Shia Islam's is clearly described in Nizam al-Mulk's "Siyasatnama":

One day, the martyred Sultan Alp Arslan was informed that Erdem had appointed Hurdabe as his katib. The ruler was greatly disturbed by the remark that "Hurdabe belongs to the Batinid sect."

One day at the palace, Alp Arslan asked Erdem, "Are you my enemy and a foe to my sultanate?" Erdem prostrated himself on the ground and pleaded, "Mercy, my sovereign, what kind of words are these? I am but your humble servant. I do not know what fault of mine has ever been seen in my service to our master's dynasty up to this day; I have never abandoned my devotion and affection for our master." The Sultan replied, "That scoundrel they call Hurdabe, who is your katib, reportedly belongs to the Batinid sect." Erdem answered, "O my ruler, who is he to matter? What harm could he possibly cause to your dynasty? Even if he were fire, he could only burn a spot as large as his own spark." The Sultan ordered, "Go and bring that fellow here!" They went and brought him into the Sultan's presence. The Sultan said, "You are a Batinid, and it is said that you claim the Caliph of Baghdad is not the rightful one." Hurdabe replied, "My ruler, your servant is not a Batinid, but a Shia Islam." The Sultan shouted, "You son of a harlot! As if being a Rafıdid were something to boast about, you declare you are not a Batinid but a Rafıdid! May a curse be upon both of these factions!" They then threw him out of the presence, dragging him away roughly. The Sultan then turned to the dignitaries present and said: "The fault lies not with this fellow, but with Erdem, who employs such heretics. I have told you a thousand times: You are Turks; you are people of Khorasan and Transoxiana. That is to say, you are strangers to these lands. I conquered this province by the stroke of the sword and by force. The overwhelming majority of the people of Iraq follow heretical and false sects; their beliefs are corrupt, and they are partisans of the Daylamites. The enmity between the Turks and the Daylamites has deep historical roots. Allah, the Almighty and Majestic, has exalted the Turks because they rule over the Daylamites. By the grace of Allah, the Almighty and Majestic, the Turks are Muslims and their faith is pure and unblemished; however, those people pursue vain desires and belong to heretical and bid'ah sects. When they are powerless against the Turks, they pretend to love, respect, and obey them; but the moment the Turks begin to weaken and they start gaining power, they attempt to hinder the affairs of the Turks. They do everything in their power to disrupt operations." Later, the Sultan ordered his men to bring horse hair weighing 200 mithqals. Pulling a single hair from the bundle, he said to Erdem, "Snap this!" Erdem took the horse hair and snapped it. The Sultan gave him five more horse hairs, and Erdem snapped them as well. Then he gave him ten horse hairs, and Erdem snapped them all in one go. Next, the Sultan ordered a farrash to braid the horse hairs to a length of three cubits and bring them back. Handing this braided hair to Erdem, the Sultan asked him to snap it. No matter how hard Erdem tried with all his might, he could not break it. Upon this, the Sultan said: "This is exactly how the enemy is. When they are one, two, or five, they seem easy to deal with; but when their numbers increase and they begin to back one another, it becomes difficult to uproot them. Let this serve as an answer to Erdem's remark that 'Even if he were fire, he could only burn a spot as large as his own spark.' These individuals infiltrate among the Turks one by one just like this, seize important positions, and once they become aware of everything the Turks are doing, rebellions will soon break out in Iraq; or the Daylamites will plot against the country. They will then secretly or openly collaborate with them, determined to bring about the destruction of the Turks. Because you are a Turk, in order to prevent any disruption in your affairs, your soldiers must also be from Khorasan; your kethuda and all your servants must be from Khorasan. If you allow the enemy of your sovereign to approach you, it means you are betraying both yourself and your sovereign. Granted, you may do whatever you wish to yourself; but it is unacceptable for you to betray your sovereign. It is not you who should tremble over yourselves, but I who must tremble over you. Allah Almighty has not made you commanders over me, but has made me commander over you. Mark this well: Whoever harbors affection for the enemies of the monarch becomes one of the enemies of the monarch, and whoever befriends troublemakers and looters becomes one of them." While the Sultan was uttering these words, Imam Mushattab and Qadi Levker were also present in the audience. The Sultan turned his face to them and asked, "What is your opinion regarding the matter I have discussed?"

They replied: "The Sultan of the World speaks the very same things that Allah and His Messenger have said regarding the Rafıdids, the Mubtadi'un (Heretic), the Batinids, and the Ahl al-Dhimmah."

== Death ==
After Manzikert, the dominion of Alp Arslan extended over much of western Asia. He soon prepared to march for the conquest of Turkestan, the original seat of his ancestors. With a powerful army, he advanced to the banks of the Oxus. Before he could pass the river safely, however, it was necessary to subdue certain fortresses, one of which was for several days vigorously defended by the rebel, Yusuf al-Kharezmi or Yusuf al-Harani. Perhaps over-eager to press on against his Qarakhanid enemy, Alp Arslan gained the governor's submission by promising the rebel 'perpetual ownership of his lands'. When he was produced a captive in the royal tent, the sultan, instead of praising his valor, severely reproached his obstinate folly: and the insolent replies of the rebel provoked a sentence, that he should be fastened to four stakes, and left to expire in that painful situation. At this command, the desperate Yusuf al-Kharezmi, drawing a dagger, rushed headlong towards the throne. The guards raised their battle-axes; their zeal was checked by Alp Arslan, the most skilful archer of the age. He drew his bow, but his foot slipped, the arrow glanced aside, and he received in his breast the dagger of Yusuf al-Kharezmi, who was instantly cut in pieces.

The wound was mortal, and the Turkish sultan bequeathed a dying admonition to the pride of kings. "In my youth," said Alp Arslan, "I was advised by a sage to humble before God; to distrust my own strength; and never to despise the most contemptible foe. I have neglected these lessons; and my neglect has been deservedly punished. Yesterday, as from an eminence I beheld the numbers, the discipline, and the spirit, of my armies, the earth seemed to tremble under my feet; and I said in my heart, Surely thou art the king of the world, the greatest and most invincible of warriors. These armies are no longer mine; and, in the confidence of my personal strength, I now fall by the hand of an assassin." Four days later, on 24 November 1072, Alp Arslan died and was buried at Merv, having designated his 18-year-old son Malik Shah as his successor.

== Family ==
One of his wives was Safariyya Khatun. She had a daughter, Sifri Khatun, who in 1071–72, married Abbasid Caliph Al-Muqtadi. Safariyya died in Isfahan in 1073–74. Another of his wives was Akka Khatun. She had been formerly the wife of Sultan Tughril. Alp Arslan married her after Tughril's death in 1063. Another of his wives was Shah Khatun. She was the daughter of Qadir Khan Yusuf, and had been formerly married to Ghaznavid Mas'ud I.

Another wife was Ummu Hifchaq, also known as Ummu Qipchaq. Another of his wives was the daughter of King of Tashir Kiurike I, who was married to the sister of the Georgian king Bagrat IV. Alp Arslan divorced her, and married her to Nizam al-Mulk. His sons were Malik-Shah I, Tutush I, Arslan Shah, Tekish, Toghan-Shah, Ayaz, and Buibars. One of his daughters married the son of Kurd Surkhab, son of Bard, in 1068.

Another daughter, Zulaikha Khatun, was married to Muslim ibn Quraysh in 1086–87. Another daughter, Aisha Khatun, married Shams al-Mulk Nasr, son of Ibrahim Khan Tamghach. Another daughter was married to Mas'ud III of Ghazni and was his first wife. Another daughter was Sara Khatun. The son of Alp Arslan's sister, Dev Ali Beg (Devle Beg), was a royal military general who played a key role in the conquest of Kayseri and gave his name to Develi district of Kayseri. His tribal family later became known as "Develioğlu" (meaning "son of Develi").

== Legacy ==
Alp Arslan's conquest of Anatolia from the Byzantines is also seen as one of the pivotal precursors to the launch of the Crusades.

From 2002 to July 2008 under Turkmen calendar reform, the month of August was named after Alp Arslan.

The 2nd Training Motorized Rifle Division of the Turkmen Ground Forces is named in his honor.

== In popular culture ==
In 2020, Malazgirt 1071, a TRT co-production film, saw Turkish actor Cengiz Coşkun in the lead role of Sultan Alp Arslan.

In the 2021 Turkish historical fiction TV series Alparslan: Büyük Selçuklu, Alp Arslan was portrayed by Turkish actor Barış Arduç.

== Sources ==
- Bosworth, C. E. (1968). "The Political and Dynastic History of the Iranian World (A.D. 1000–1217)". In Frye, R. N. (ed.). The Cambridge History of Iran, Volume 5: The Saljuq and Mongol periods. Cambridge: Cambridge University Press. pp. 1–202. ISBN 0-521-06936-X.
- Bosworth, C. E. (1975). "The early Ghaznavids". In Frye, R. N. (ed.). The Cambridge History of Iran, Volume 4: From the Arab Invasion to the Saljuqs. Cambridge: Cambridge University Press. pp. 162–198. ISBN 0-521-20093-8.
- Bosworth, C. E. (1975). "Iran under the Buyids". In Frye, R. N. (ed.). The Cambridge History of Iran, Volume 4: From the Arab Invasion to the Saljuqs. Cambridge: Cambridge University Press. pp. 250–305. ISBN 0-521-20093-8.
- Cahen, Claude (1986). "Alp Arslan". In Gibb, H. A. R.; Kramers, J. H.; Levi-Provencal, E.; Schacht, J. (eds.). The Encyclopaedia of Islam. Vol. I: A-B. Brill.
- Çoban, R. V. (2020). The Manzikert Battle and Sultan Alp Arslan with European Perspective in the 15st Century in the Miniatures of Giovanni Boccaccio's "De Casibus Virorum Illustrium"s 226 and 232. French Manuscripts in Bibliothèque Nationale de France. S. Karakaya ve V. Baydar (Ed.), in 2nd International Muş Symposium Articles Book (pp. 48–64). Muş: Muş Alparslan University. Source
- Harris, Jonathan (2014). Byzantium and the Crusades (2 ed.). Bloomsbury Publishing. ISBN 978-1780938318.
- Jeffreys, Elizabeth; Haldon, John F.; Cormack, Robin, eds. (2008). The Oxford Handbook of Byzantine Studies. Oxford University Press. ISBN 978-0199252466.
- Kafesoğlu, İbrahim (1989). "Alparslan". TDV Encyclopedia of Islam, Vol. 2 (Ahlâk – Amari̇) (in Turkish). Istanbul: Presidency of Religious Affairs, Centre for Islamic Studies. pp. 526–530. ISBN 978-975-389-429-6.
- Lock, Peter (2006). The Routledge Companion to the Crusades. Routledge. ISBN 978-1135131371.
- Madelung, W. (1975). "The Minor Dynasties of Northern Iran". In Frye, R. N. (ed.). The Cambridge History of Iran, Volume 4: From the Arab Invasion to the Saljuqs. Cambridge: Cambridge University Press. pp. 198–249. ISBN 978-0-521-20093-6.
- Markham, Paul (2 September 2013). "The Battle of Manzikert: Military Disaster or Political Failure? » De Re Militari". De Re Militari. The Society for Medieval Military History.
- Norwich, John Julius (1997). A Short History of Byzantium. New York: Vintage. p. 241. ISBN 0-679-45088-2.
- Minorsky, Vladimir (1958). A History of Sharvān and Darband in the 10th–11th Centuries. University of Michigan. pp. 1–219.
- Nicolle, David (2013). Manzikert 1071: The breaking of Byzantium. Illustrated by Christa Hook. Osprey Publishing. ISBN 978-1780965031.
- Frederick William Bussell (1910). The Roman Empire, Essays on the Constitutional History from the Accession of Domitian (81 A. D.) to the Retirement of Nicephorus III (1081 A.D.).
- George Finlay (1877). The Byzantine and Greek empires, pt. 2, A.D. 1057-1453.
- Oktay Belli (2021). Ani in Every Aspect.
- Nizam al-Mulk. Siyasatnama. Translated by Işık, Mert. Panama Yayınları. ISBN 978-625-5618-29-0.

Alp Arslan House of Seljuq Born: 20 January 1029 Died: 15 December 1072
Regnal titles
Preceded by Toghrul-Beg	Sultan of the Seljuq Empire; 4 October 1063– 15 December 1072	Succeeded by Malik-Shah I
