= Kingdom of Vanand =

Medieval Armenian kingdom

Kingdom of Vanand Վանանդի թագավորություն
- 963–1064
- Kingdom of Vanand c. 1060 A.D.
- Capital: Kars
- Common languages: Armenian
- Religion: Armenian Apostolic Church
- Government: Monarchy
- Historical era: Middle Ages
  - Established: 963
  - Disestablished: 1064
| Preceded by | Succeeded by |
| Bagratid Armenia | Byzantine Empire |

Kingdom of Kars (Armenian: Կարսի թագավորություն), alternatively known as the Kingdom of Vanand (Armenian: Վանանդի թագավորություն), was a medieval Armenian kingdom formed in the year 963 by the son of Abas I of Armenia, Mushegh Bagratuni (d. 984). The capital of the kingdom was Kars, currently part of modern-day Turkey.

In 963, shortly after the Bagratuni seat was transferred to Ani, Kars became the capital of a separate independent kingdom called Vanand. However, the extent of its actual independence from the Kingdom of Ani is uncertain: it was always in the possession of the relatives of the rulers of Ani, and, after Ani's capture by the Byzantine Empire in 1045, the Bagratuni title "King of Kings" held by the ruler of Ani was transferred to the ruler of Kars. In 1064, just after the capture of Ani by Alp Arslan (leader of the Seljuk Turks), the Armenian king of Kars, Gagik-Abas, paid homage to the victorious Turks so that they would not lay siege to his city. In 1065 Gagik-Abas ceded his kingdom to the Byzantine Empire, but soon after Kars was taken by the Seljuk Turks.

== Rulers ==
| Ruler | Reign | title | Notes |
|---|---|---|---|
| 1. Mushegh | 963 — 984 | King | |
| 2. Abas | 984 — 1029 | King | |
| 3. Gagik-Abas | 1029 — 1065 | King | |

== See also ==
- Bagratid Armenia
- Vanand
