= Abas Bagratuni =

Abas of Kars
- King of Kars

King of Vanand
- Reign: 984-1029
- Predecessor: Mushegh I
- Successor: Gagik-Abas
- Died: 1029
- Spouse: daughter of Sahak Sevada
- Issue: Gagik-Abas
- Dynasty: Bagratuni dynasty
- Father: Mushegh I
- Religion: Armenian Apostolic Church

Abas Bagratuni, King of Kars (Vananda) (984–1029), grandson of the Armenian King Abbas Bagratuni, son of King Mushegh I Bagratuni of Kars, and a descendant of the Bagratuni royal dynasty.

== Biography ==
Abas inherited the kingdom of Kars from his father, Mushegh I. His mother was the daughter of Sahak Sevada, Prince of Gardmank. During his nearly half-century reign, King Abas, according to historians, improved the country, eradicated "theft and robbery," created a standing army, ensured the safe passage of trade caravans, and ensured the safety of life and property. He established close military and political relations with the ruling branches of the Bagratuni dynasty of Shirak. Both King Mushegh of Kars and Abas harbored ambitions for the kingdom of Pharisos in northeastern Armenia. At that time, the brothers Senekerim and Grigor ruled there, bearing the titles "Glorious" and "Pious," and their sister was the queen of Kars, wife of King Mushegh and mother of Abbas. After the death of these kings, the queen of Kars could have been considered the heir to the future vacant throne of Pharisos.

== The Emergence of the Kingdom of Kars ==
During the reign of the Armenian king Ashot Vogormats (the Merciful) (953–977), the city of Ani, which had grown and expanded on the steep banks of the inner Akhurian River, rose to rival Kars.When Ashot III moved the capital to Ani in 961, his brother Mushegh Bagratuni was appointed governor of Kars, who in 963 proclaimed himself king of Kars and its province, "King of Karuts." Ashot III was forced to recognize his kingdom, but as a subordinate principality. Thus, the subordinate kingdom of Kars was created, which lasted for a century (963–1064).

The Shahnshah, based in Ani, was considered the ruler of the kingdoms of Vaspurakan, Syunik, Khachen-Parisos, Kars, and Tashir-Dzoraget, and the king of Ani was considered the "head of the nation" over the Armenian and Georgian Bagratunis, a circumstance that justified the superior rights of the Armenian Bagratunis (9th-10th centuries) over the Georgian Bagratunis as well.

As before, the Sparpets and princes residing in Kars, as representatives of the Bagratuni dynasty, considered themselves the legitimate heirs to the throne of the central Bagratuni kingdom, and therefore they made such claims at every opportunity. For example, after the death of Ashot III the Merciful, when his brother, King Mushegh of Karuta, attempted to ascend the throne of the Shahnshahs of Ani, the council of elders of Ani hastened to elevate the late Ashot III's son, Smbat II. And Mushegh was forced to accept the situation. Now the situation had changed: if Kars had once been the largest, most economically developed, and wealthiest center of the Armenian Bagratunis, that role had now passed to Ani.

== Accession to the Throne ==
Abas (984–1029) ascended the throne by order of his "leader," the Armenian King Smbat II, the Ecumenical Monarch. Or, as Matthew of Urkhaeti attests:

"Abas ascended the throne in Kars with royal power by order of his leader, Gagka (who was probably Smbat, the Armenian king... and was subordinate to the House of Shiraki ''.

== Activities ==
During his 45-year reign, Abas maintained peaceful and loyal relations with the princes of Ani and, taking advantage of the relatively long period of peace, focused on the internal affairs of his country.

Abas's contemporary, the historian Stepanos Taronetsi Asoghik, speaks highly of him, describing him and his activities in glowing terms.

"Before becoming king, he was a mischievous and cheerful child, and those who saw him thought he was ignorant of spiritual good deeds. But upon ascending the royal throne, he became a magnificent man, a sage, full of genius, considered first among sages...''.

Abas strove above all to establish peace in his kingdom. He eradicated robbery in his country, which had reached such a scale that people themselves had ceased to own their own property. He severely punished criminals, eliminated them, and ensured a peaceful and tranquil life in the country.

Abas paid special attention to the armed forces and introduced a special red military uniform. King Abas and his army participated in joint Armenian-Georgian military campaigns against the Arab emirs of Southern Armenia (in 994).

The small kingdom of Kars was destabilized during the bloody wars between the Byzantine Empire and the Georgian Bagratids, which arose from a dispute over the inheritance of the late David of Kurapakhat. During this time, the territory of the kingdom of Kars, transformed into a battlefield for the warring parties, was greatly devastated. However, after this, the kingdom of Kars managed to maintain peace during the reign of Abas's son, Gagik Karsetsi (1029–1065).

== Battle of Tsumba ==
Abas Karsetsi participated in the joint struggle against Emir Mamlan of Atrpatakan and in the Battle of Tsumba in 998. Mamlan, taking advantage of David Kuropat's capture of Manazkert, which belonged to the Kayisiks, attacked Armenia with a large army and advanced as far as the province of Apakhunyak. He was opposed by the Bagratuni King Gagik I of Ani, Abas, and other Armenian armies led by General Vahram Pahlavuni. David Kuropat of Tayk and the Georgian King Gurgen also sent their troops to the Armenian contingent. The battle took place near the village of Tsmbo in Apakhunyak, where the Armenian-Georgian forces defeated Mamlan and expelled him from the country. Abas was succeeded by his son Gagik (1029–1065).

== Literature ==
1. Հայ ժողովրդի պատմություն, Հ. Ժամկոչյան, Ա. Աբրահամյան, Ս. Մելիք-Բախշյան, Ս. Պողոսյան, Երևան, 1975։
2. Պատմագիտական ուսումնասիրություններ, Նիկողայոս Ադոնց, Հատոր Ա, Երևան, 2006։
3. Ս. Երեմյան, Կարսի թագավորության առաջացումը և ծաղկումը, Երևան, 1976։
4. Matthew of Edessa, chronology, Erevan, 1973, pg 70:
5. Stepanos Taronetsi, Universal History, Erevan, 2000:
