= Mikail (son of Seljuk) =

Seljuk chief

Mikail was a Turkic chieftain who lived in the 10th century and early 11th century.

His father was Seljuk who is known as the founder of the Seljuk dynasty. Although his grandsons would be sultans after his death, Seljuk was only a leader of a tribe named Kınık which was a part of a loosely formed Oghuz Turk confederation (see Oghuz Yabgu State).

Mikail was one of the sons of Seljuk Beg. Just like other Oghuz people Seljuk and his sons were initially non Muslim. But after conversion, they began fighting against non Muslims. Mikail was killed in one of these battles. Although his exact death date is uncertain, it must be in the early 11th century (perhaps 1009).

Mikail Beg had two sons: Chagri (989–1060) and Tughril (990–1063). The Seljuk Empire was founded by them. Chagri is the ancestor of all later Seljuk sultans (except those in Seljuks of Rum).
