= Jankent =

Deserted town in modern Kazakhstan

- Dzhankent, Yangikent
- Location within Kazakhstan Location within West and Central Asia
- 45°36′44″N 61°55′16″E
- Type: Fortified settlement
- Cultures: Oghuz Turks
- Location: Kazaly, Kazakhstan

History
- Built: 7th/10th centuries AD
- Abandoned: 11/12th centuries AD

Site notes
- Area: 16 ha (40 acres)
- Excavation dates: 2005-19

Jankent (Dzhankent, Yangikent, Eni-Kent, Djanikand, Yenikent, Yanikand, all meaning New Town in Turkic; al-Karyat al-hadith, Dihi Naw, Shehrkent) is a deserted town east of the Aral Sea in modern Kazakhstan. It is known from Arab writings of the 10th century AD as the capital of the steppe empire of Oghuz Turks. Archaeological research has provided information about the appearance of the town and confirmed the date, but also points to earlier origins.

== Description ==
Jankent is located on the left bank of the lower Syr Darya, about 25 kilometres (16 mi) southwest from the town of Kazaly (formerly Kazalinsk), in the Kazaly district of Kyzylorda province in Kazakhstan. Today, it is a scheduled monument marked by the ruins of walls which are up to 7 metres (23 ft) high in places and enclose an area of 16 hectares (40 acres) in the dried-out river delta of the Syr-Darya. Visible elements of the lay-out include: a broadly rectangular wall circuit orientated east-west, given a T-shaped appearance by an eastern ‘cross-bar’; a regular lay-out in the western half of the interior; gates in the eastern and western walls; a separately enclosed ‘citadel’ in the north-western corner; a semicircular annexe attached to the northern wall; and a low mound outside the east gate suggesting an external structure.

== Historical evidence ==
Arab geographers of the 10th century (Al-Masudi, Al-Idrisi) mention a town of the Oghuz called Jengi-Kent, two sources (Ibn Rustah and Ibn Hawqal) even call it the seat of the Oghuz Yabgu (khan of second rank). As early as the 1920s, the orientalist V.V. Bartold identified Jankent as the site of the historical Jengi-Kent. The town is also identified as the home town of the Kazakh cultural hero, Korkyt Ata, the reputed inventor of the traditional two-stringed lute (kobyz).

== Archaeological evidence ==
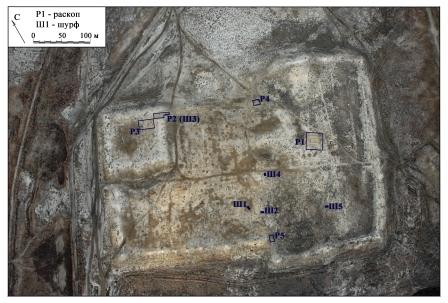
Aerial photo of Jankent, with locations of archaeological sections 2005-2014

Jankent was first mentioned by Russian army topographers in the early 19th century, and visited in 1867 by the orientalist P. Lerkh. In 1946, a team of the Chorasmian Expedition surveyed the site and photographed it from the air. On the basis of the lay-out of the site and the finds collected during this visit, the director of the expedition, S.P. Tolstov, dated Jankent to the 1st – 11th centuries AD. Two other members of the expedition, N.I. Igonin and B.V. Andrianov, drew up an improved plan of Jankent in 1963.

Systematic excavations have been carried out at Jankent since 2005 by various teams, mainly the Institute of Ethnology and Anthropology, Russian Academy of Sciences (IEA RAN, Moscow) with Korkyt Ata State University of Kyzylorda (Kazakhstan) and the University of Tübingen (Germany); and the Margulan Institute of Archaeology, Kazakh Ministry of Education and Science (MON), later its commercial branch ‘Archaeological Expertise’ (Almaty, Kazakhstan), with Pavlodar State University (Kazakhstan).

=== Lower town ===
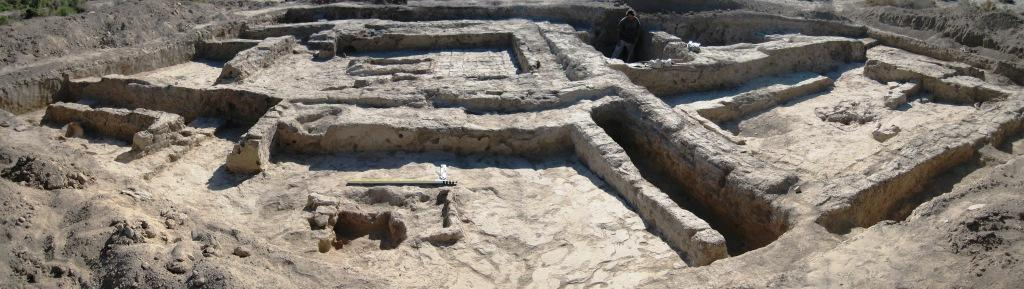
Composite picture of building remains uncovered in the lower town of Jankent in 2005-6

In the centre of the town, essential discoveries in Trench P1 included a built-up area (living quarters) with a lay-out in Central Asian style along a street, and a possible metal workshop, all dated to the 9th/10th centuries on the basis of coin finds. Later excavations in this area since 2011 have been carried out to a greater depth, revealing several building phases of earlier date.

=== Citadel ===
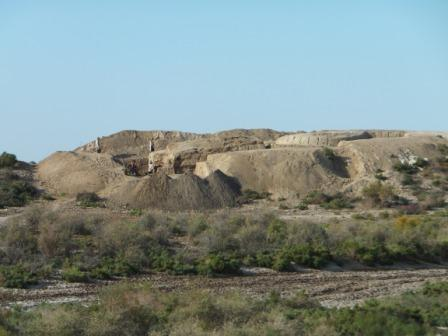
View of citadel of Jankent from the north, with corner tower uncovered (bright feature at upper right) (photo H. Härke 2013)

At the junction of the citadel wall and northern town wall (Trench P2), occupation layers with complex stratification were found by the Russian-Kazakh-German team down to a depth of more than 8 metres (26 ft) from the current top of the citadel wall. Radiocarbon dates from this trench produced a range of (cal.) AD 786/923 to 961/1095. The extension of the trench at the top of the citadel wall since 2012 has uncovered semi-circular towers on the wall. In 2019, a 9th/10th century pottery vessel from the outside of the northern base of the citadel wall was found to contain three eggs with Arabic writing on them.

Fieldwork in the interior of the citadel (Trench P3) by the Almaty and Pavlodar teams has reportedly uncovered only two layers of 9th/10th century date, the lower one of which produced building remains and a street. Lack of detailed publication precludes an independent verification of these claims.

=== Town wall ===
A trench in the kink of the southern town wall (Trench P5) proved that the T-shaped lay-out of the wall circuit was part of the original design, similar to earlier enclosures further south in the neighbouring civilization of Khorezm (Chorasmia, Khwarazm). Settlement layers with 7th/8th century pottery were found here under the base of the town wall, confirmed by radiocarbon dates for this trench ranging from (cal.) AD 674/799 to 906/1057. An earlier trench (P4) in the corresponding kink in the northern wall is briefly mentioned, but not documented, in a summary report by the Almaty and Pavlodar teams.

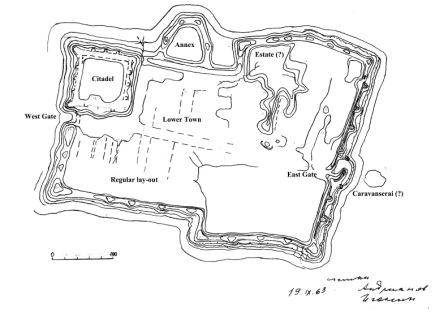
Plan of Jankent by the Chorasmian Expedition (1963), with additional annotations showing elements of the town (I.A. Arzhantseva 2015)

=== Geophysics, geomorphology, soil science ===
Since 2011, a team from Moscow State University has applied several non-destructive survey techniques to large parts of the site. The results show that the citadel interior was probably located on a natural elevation. There was a regular lay-out and dense arrangement of buildings across much of the western half of the interior, in contrast to larger building complexes ('estates') in a loose arrangement in the eastern half. The annexe attached to the northern town wall proved to be completely empty. In 2019, a Moscow geomorphology-pedology team carried out mechanical coring on a grid across the site. Preliminary results include deep stratification of cultural layers several metres down found in most cores; the large regular feature on the inside of the northern wall is not an 'estate' (as originally thought), but a massive clay platform; and the substantial structure outside the east gate, hypothesized to be the remains of a caravanserai, are a natural island in a (now dry) river bed dating to before the beginnings of settlement at Dzhankent.

== Current state of knowledge ==
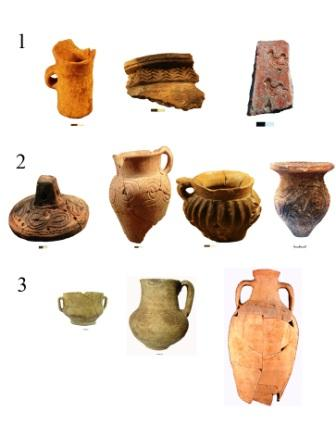
Pottery types found in 9th/10th century AD layers of Jankent: 1 - Dzhetyasar, 2 - Oghuz, 3 - Khorezmian (created by I.A. Arzhantseva 2012)

On the basis of their findings since 2011, the Russian-Kazakh-German team suggest that the earliest settlement at this site was founded in the 7th century by a displaced population of the Dzhetyasar culture further upriver. This coincided with the beginnings of trading activities along the early medieval branch of the Northern Silk Road running through this region. The enclosed town of Jankent was then built in the 9th or 10th century, some time after the arrival of the Turkic Oghuz on the steppes north of the Syr-darya. The town population may have been mixed as the material culture found at the site derives from three different cultural components: Oghuz nomads, sedentary Dzhetyasar culture, and Khorezmian civilization. In the 10th and 11th centuries, the town was the capital of the Oguz Yabgu State, and most likely it also functioned as a trading and craft centre for the largely nomadic population of the polity, being located on the intersection of the Northern Silk Road with the north-south caravan route from the Volga region to Khorezm.

The town was abandoned some time between the 12th and 14th century AD for unknown reasons, perhaps because of a shift of the river channels in the Syr-Darya delta, a change in trading patterns, or because of political developments. Other Turkic peoples, the Kipchaks and Kimeks of the Kimek Kaganate, destroyed the Oghuz polity in the 12th century. Around that time, Selçuk Bey and his Kınık tribe headed to Persia to found their own Muslim state which would eventually become the Great Seljuq Empire.
