= Jand (Transoxania) =

Medieval town in Transoxiana in modern-day Kazakhstan

Coordinates: 44.6167°N 64.1500°E

- Interactive map of Jand
- Type: Settlement, Frontier Fortress, Trade Center
- Cultures: Oghuz Turks, Seljuks, Khwarazmians
- Location: Near Qyzylorda (Kyzylorda Region)
- Region: Transoxiana / Lower Syr Darya (Jaxartes)
- Part of: Kazakhstan

History
- Built: c. 10th century (or earlier)
- Abandoned: 13th–14th century (sacked during the Mongol Invasions)
- Events: Seljuk immigration to Jand; Alp Arslan's Campaigns; Khwarazmian Rule; Sack by Mongols

Site notes
- Excavation dates: 20th century (Soviet archaeological surveys)
- Archaeologists: Sergey Tolstov

Jand (also Jend), was a medieval town on the right bank of the lower Jaxartes river in Transoxiana in modern-day Kazakhstan. It was the winter capital of the Seljuk Turks before their migration to Khurasan. It was later sacked by the Mongols, and is now in ruins.

== History ==
=== The Seat of the Seljuk Dynasty ===
Jand is famous for being the historical seat of the Seljuk Dynasty from 985 to 1016.

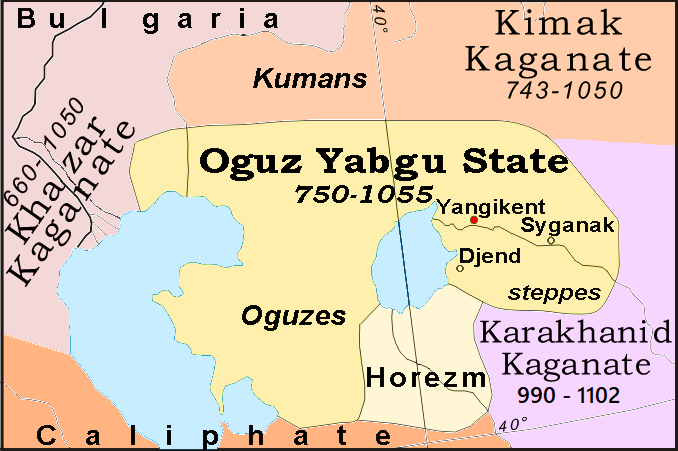
Oghuz Yabgu (750-1055 AD)

Seljuk had great power and influence among the people of his tribe who lived within the territory of the Oghuz Yabgu State. The relationship between Seljuk and Oghuz Yabgu was overshadowed by an incident that is not well known because of lack of reliable sources. Nonetheless, Seljuk left the Oghuz Yabgu State and immigrated with his tribe, to the town of Jand. It is rumored that there were 100 horseman, 1,500 camels and 50,000 sheep with Seljuk Beg during this migration. If each horseman equates to a family, the Seljuks who migrated to Jand were likely a small nomadic community of about 500 people.There, Seljuk and his Oghuz tribe accepted Islam.

After accepting Islam, Seljuk expelled the officials sent by the Oghuz Yabgu to Jand to collect the annual tax, saying "Muslims will not pay tribute to the unbelievers", and set up a war against the non-Muslim Turks. This may well be proved by Al-Bayhaqi who calls Seljuk Beg as al-Malik al-Ghâzî Seljuk (meaning "ruler and religious fighter Seljuk").

Jand thereafter became prime seat of the Seljuk leaders, including Seljuk Bey, Mikâ'îl Yabugu, Arslan Isra'il, as well as Toghrul and Chaghri Bey (initially), before the foundation of the Seljuk Empire in 1037.

=== Alp Arslan's Campaigns (1065) ===
In 1065, Alp Arslan launched a military campaign towards Üstyurt and the Mangışlak regions with a Seljuk army of 30,000 men. During the campaign, he defeated the Türkmen, Kıpçak, and Cazık forces. He subsequently defeated a Kıpçak army of 30,000 men commanded by Kafşud. Alp Arslan then carried out conquests in Mâverâünnehir and conquered Khwarazm. Following these victories, he visited the tomb of his ancestor, Selçuk Bey, in Jand and annexed this region to the territories governed by his son, Melikşah. As a result of this campaign, the territories stretching from the Caspian Sea to Tashkent came under the rule of the Great Seljuk Empire. Probably, the Khan of Jand, who welcomed Alp Arslan with gifts during his journey to Jand and Sapran (1066), was from the Oghuz and an independent ruler.

=== Under Khwarazmian Rule ===
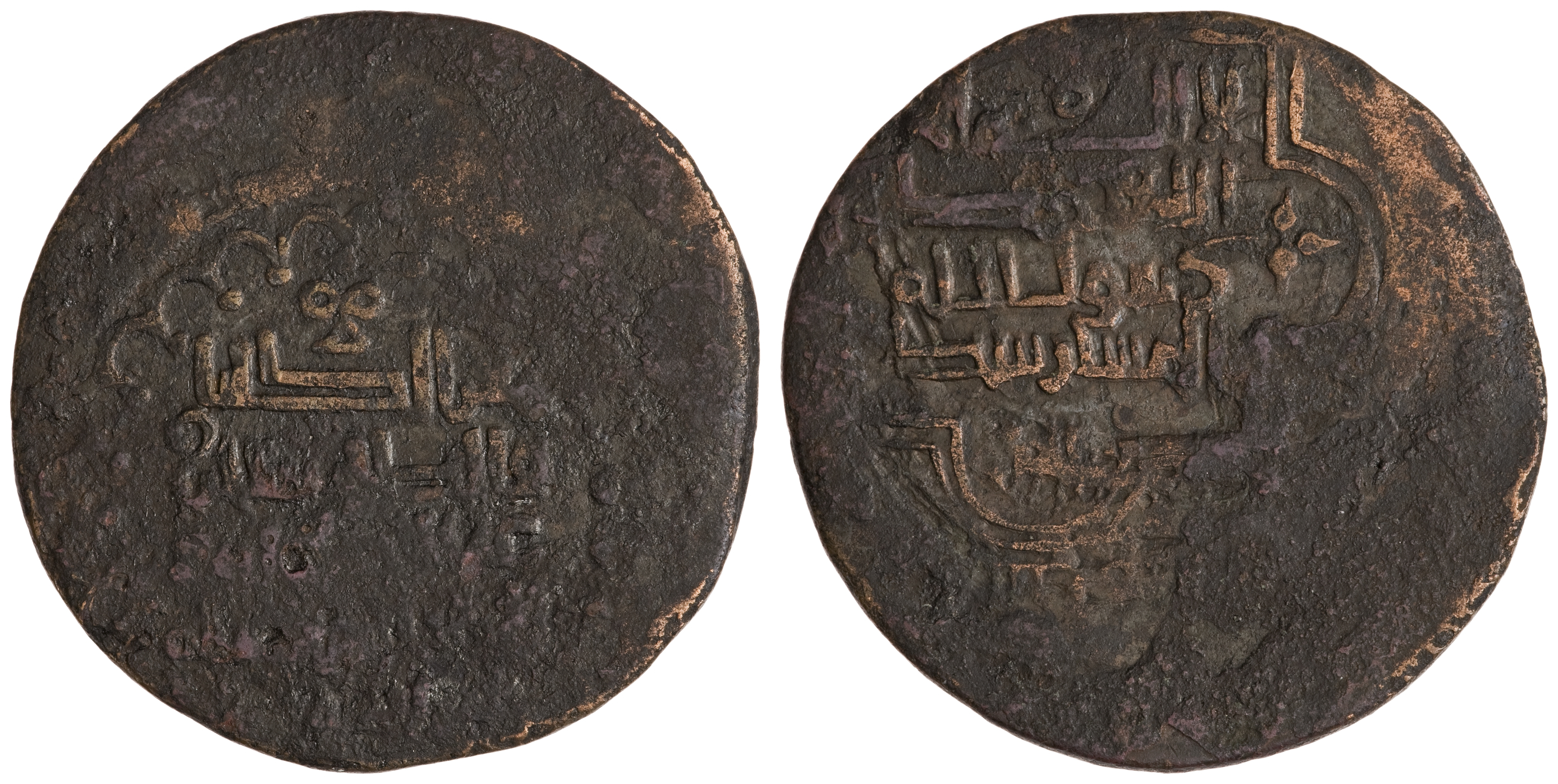
Coinage of the Khwarazmshah Atsiz, citing his suzerain Ahmad Sanjar

Jand was brought under Khwarazmian rule during the reign of Atsiz. Atsiz was a flexible politician and ruler, and was able to maneuver between the powerful Sultan Ahmad Sanjar and equally powerful Yelü Dashi. He continued the land-gathering policy initiated by his predecessors, annexing Jand and Mangyshlak to Khwarazm. Many nomadic tribes were dependent on the Khwarazmshah. Towards the end of his life, Atsiz subordinated the entire northwestern part of Central Asia, and in fact, achieved its independence from the neighbors.

Jand remained under Khwarazmian rule until the Mongol conquest of the Central Asia in 1221.

== See also ==
- Sighnaq

== Sources ==
- C.F. Bosworth, The Ghaznavids, Edinburgh, 1963.
- Özgüdenli, Osman Gazi (2018). "Selçukluların Kökeni" [Origin of the Seljuks]. In Turan, Refik (ed.). Selçuklu Tarihi El Kitabı [Seljuk History Handbook] (in Turkish). Grafiker Yayınları. pp. 19–37.
