= Ibrahim Inal =

Seljuk prince & warlord (died 1060)

Melik Ibrahim Inal Yinal Bey
- Born: Ibrahim Yinal; 1000s
- Died: c. 1060; Baghdad, Abbasid Caliphate (now Iraq)
- Burial place: Hamedan
- Spouse: Oke Hatun
- Relatives: Yûsuf Yınal (father) Tughril (brother) Chagri Bey (brother) Erbaskan Bey (brother) Oke Hatun (wife)
- Military career
- Allegiance: Seljuqs
- Service years: 1040s – 1060
- Nickname: Yinal Bey
- Commands: Great Seljuk Army
- Conflicts: Battle of Kapetron; Capture of Hamadan; Battle of Rey (1059); Battle of Ganja (1046); Battle of Nishapur (1038); Battle of Sarakhs (1038); Battle of Hamadan; Campaign of Anatolia; Capture of Nishapur; Capture of Rey; Capture of Jibal; Capture of Borujerd; Capture of Shapurkhwast; Siege of Sarmaj; Siege of Fortress of Ibn Umar; Capture of Dinavar; Capture of Kirmanshah; Capture of Hulwan; Capture of Shahrizur

Ibrahim Inal (also spelled Ibrahim Yinal, died 1060) was a Seljuk warlord, governor and prince (melik). He was the son of Seljuk's Son Yûsuf Yinal, thus being a grandson of the Seljuk Gazi. He was also a half brother of the Sultan Tughril and Chagri Bey with whom he shared the same mother. He was the Seljuk governor of Mosul (Iraq) and Gence (Azerbaijan).

Ibrahim Yinal went on various expeditions and conquests for the Great Seljuk Empire, and for his Sultan, Sultan Tughril. He had various battles with the Ghaznavid Empire, Roman (Byzantine) Empire and Buyid Empires. He heavily contributed to the Seljuk conquest of Persia, even capturing the throne city of Rey, which is now a part of modern-day Tehran. In 1047, Ibrahim wrested Hamadan and Kangavar from the Kakuyid ruler Garshasp I.

Ibrahim Yinal during his service to the Great Seljuk Empire was appointed the Seljuk Governor of Mosul and Gence. His dominion stretched from Iraq to Azerbaijan, effectively ruling all of the western side and western frontiers of the Seljuk Empire. All raids against the Byzantine, Armenian and Georgian lands would use Yinal's lands as a headquarters. Notable raids were the Seljuk conquest of Vaspurakan.

A highlight of his military career can be that Ibrahim Yinal commanded a successful raid against the eastern provinces of the Byzantine Empire which culminated in the Battle of Kapetron in September 1048. This battle was a decisive victory for the Seljuk Empire. The Arab chronicler Ibn al-Athir reports that he brought back 100,000 captives and a vast booty loaded on the backs of ten thousand camels.

== Death ==
In 1058, for various reasons, including believing that he wasn't appropriately acknowledged for his contributions to the empire, and not being named the heir to the throne, he revolted against Sultan Tugrul. He raised a large army based out of Hamedan, Iran, and was allied with the then Fatimid military commander, Arslan al-Basasiri. In 1060 Ibrahim Yinal's rebellion was eventually defeated. In some sources, it is stated that the battle was fought in the vicinity of Rey and the troops under the command of Alp Arslan, Yakuti and Kavurd defeated and captured Ibrahim Yinal. After Ibrahim Yinal's defeat, he was personally strangled by Tughril with his bowstring at Baghdad, though some sources say this was in the Seljuk throne city of Rey which is part of modern-day Tehran. Strangling a noble, or someone with ruling blood with a bowstring was a common practice in the medieval world.

== Aftermath ==
The Legacy of Ibrahim Yinal would continue to affect the world even after his death. His victory in the Battle of Kapetron was crucial in opening the gates of Anatolia for the Muslim Turks and was crucial for the Battle of Malazgrit. It is also a famous quote by Sultan AbdulHamid II (the Last Ottoman Sultan before the Young Turk Revolution) that "In order for the Ottomans (Muslims) to be where they went today (conquest of Constantinople, Battle of Vienna etc.) there needed to be Malazgrit (Battle of Manzikert) and in order to be at Malazgrit, there needed to be a Pasinler (Battle of Kapetron )

The rebellion of Ibrahim Yinal also likely encouraged his cousin Qutalmish's rebellion against Alp Arslan.

Still despite his short comings and rebellions, Ibrahim Yinal is regarded as a hero in Turkic, Seljuk, and Muslim history. He was considered (along with Alp Arslan) the best fighter in the Great Seljuk Empire of his time.

In popular media he is played by Uygar Özçelik in the popular TRT1 drama Alparslan: Buyuk Sulcuklu.

== Sources ==
- Bosworth, C. E. (1968). "The Political and Dynastic History of the Iranian World (A.D. 1000–1217)". In Boyle, John Andrew (ed.). The Cambridge History of Iran: The Saljuq and Mongol Periods. Vol. 5. Cambridge: Cambridge University Press. pp. 1–202. ISBN 0-521-06936-X.
