= Battle of Nasa (1035) =

Battle between the Ghaznavids and Seljuks (1035)

- Part of the Seljuk-Ghaznavid Wars
Date	June 1035
Location	Nasa
Result	Seljuk victory

Belligerents
Ghaznavid Empire	Seljuk Turks

Commanders and leaders
Hajib Begtughdi	Mikail; Chaghri Beg; Tughril Beg

Strength
15,000	Around 10,000

Casualties and losses
Unknown	Unknown

The Battle of Nasa took place between the Seljuk Turks and the Ghaznavid Empire following the death of the former leader of the Seljuks, Israil.

In 1016, Chagri Beg, son of Israil, led an incursion into eastern Anatolia, he defeated Armenian forces near Lake Van. In 1020-1021, Israil seized Bukhara in cooperation with the Karakhanids. The Ghaznavids watched the Seljuks apprehensively. A meeting was held in Transoxiana in 1025 between the khagan of the Karakhanids and the sultan of the Ghaznavids. During this meeting, it was decided that the Seljuks were to be rounded up and transferred away from Transoxiana and Turkestan before they caused any problems for the Ghaznavids. Israil was apparently lured to Samarkand where he was arrested and exiled to India where he died in 1032.

The death of Israil caused a sudden collapse of authority among the Seljuks, however, Mikail, the brother of Israil, was able to reassert the Seljuks as a cohesive force and pose a challenge to the Ghaznavid state for control of Khorasan. On June 19, 1035, a 15,000 strong Ghaznavid force under the command of Hajib Begtughdi left for Nasa. The Seljukids shocked the Ghaznavids and inflicted a serious defeat against them at Nasa in 1035. In battle the Seljuks used the feigned flight tactic and managed to use a stimulated withdrawal to lure their enemy into a surprise attack.

Due to this serious defeat the Ghaznavids offered the Seljuk Turks three provinces in Khorasan, this was part of a treaty that included a grant of tribal autonomy within the Ghaznavid state. The Seljukids did not comply and continued to raid as far as Balkh and Sistan.
