= Toghan-Shah (son of Alp Arslan) =

Seljuk ruler of Great Khorasan, r. 1083–92

Toghan Shah
- Shams al-Dawla

Emir of Greater Khorasan
- Reign: 1083-1092
- Predecessor: Arslan Shah
- Successor: Arslan Arghun
- Born: Toghan
- Died: 1192; Herat (modern Afghanistan)
- House: Seljuk dynasty
- Father: Alp Arslan
- Religion: Sunni Islam

Shams al-Dawla Toghan Shah ibn Alp Arslan, nicknamed Abu al-Fawaris, was one of the Seljuk rulers of Khorasan. He ruled for a period (1083-1092) and took Herat as his headquarter.

== Life ==
He came from the Seljuk dynasty. He was the son of Sultan Alp Arslan. At birth his name was Oghuz Toghan Shah, little is known about him, and there is no information that he led any military campaigns. However, he received some achievements and honorary titles as "Shams al-Dawla". Toghan shah was loyal to malikshah i and he distinguished himself when he defeated gaznavid ruler ibrahim i forces in 1074 . In 1083, after the death of his brother Arslan Shah, he was appointed king of Great Khorasan. The city of Herat was chosen as its headquarters. In 1084, he clashed with another brother Tekish (Emir of Balkh and Tokharistan). Perhaps he did not have enough ability to resist his brother, so he lost Eastern Khorasan. This led to the intervention of Malik Shah, who defeated Tekish. Malik Shah captured him and then blinded him.

Later, Toghan Shah ruled peacefully in Khorasan. He was an ally of scholars and poets. In 1092, after Malik Shah's death, he was probably overthrown by his another brother Arslan Arghun.
