= Gagik-Abas =

King of Kars from 1029 to 1064

Gagik-Abas II Գագիկ Աբասյան
- Royal enthronement scene from the frontispiece of a gospel commissioned by Gagik-Abas, ruler of Kars, circa 1050/1060. The dress is influenced by Abbasid Arab court style (and the robe worn by Gagik-Abas of Seljuk fashion).

King of Vanand Claimant King of Armenia in exile (from 1045)
- Reign: 1029–1064
- Predecessor: Abas Bagratuni
- Successor: Position dismissed
- Born: Unknown
- Died: 1069; Cappadocia
- Dynasty: Bagratuni dynasty
- Father: Abas Bagratuni
- Religion: Armenian Apostolic

Gagik-Abas, or Gagik-Abas II of Kars (ruled 1029–1065) was the Bagratid king of Kars, ruler of the Kingdom of Vanand. He was the son of Abas I (984–1029). He was a claimant to the throne of Bagratid Armenia after the collapse of the main Bagratid kingdom in 1045.

Gagik-Abas was confronted to the conquests of the Seljuk Turks, who under Alp Arslan took the old Bagratid capital of Ani in 1064. Hoping to save Kars, he paid homage to the victorious Turks so that they would not lay siege to his city.

In order to obtain protection from the Byzantine Empire, he was constrained to abdicate and cede his lands to the Byzantines and retreat to Anatolia, but Kars was then captured by the Seljuk Turks in 1065. In Baghk and Eastern Syunik, only a few Armenian fortresses remained. He retired to Cappadoccia, where he died in 1069.

== See also ==
- Kingdom of Kars
