= Arslan Isra'il =

Turkic chieftain and the son of Seljuk (died 1032)

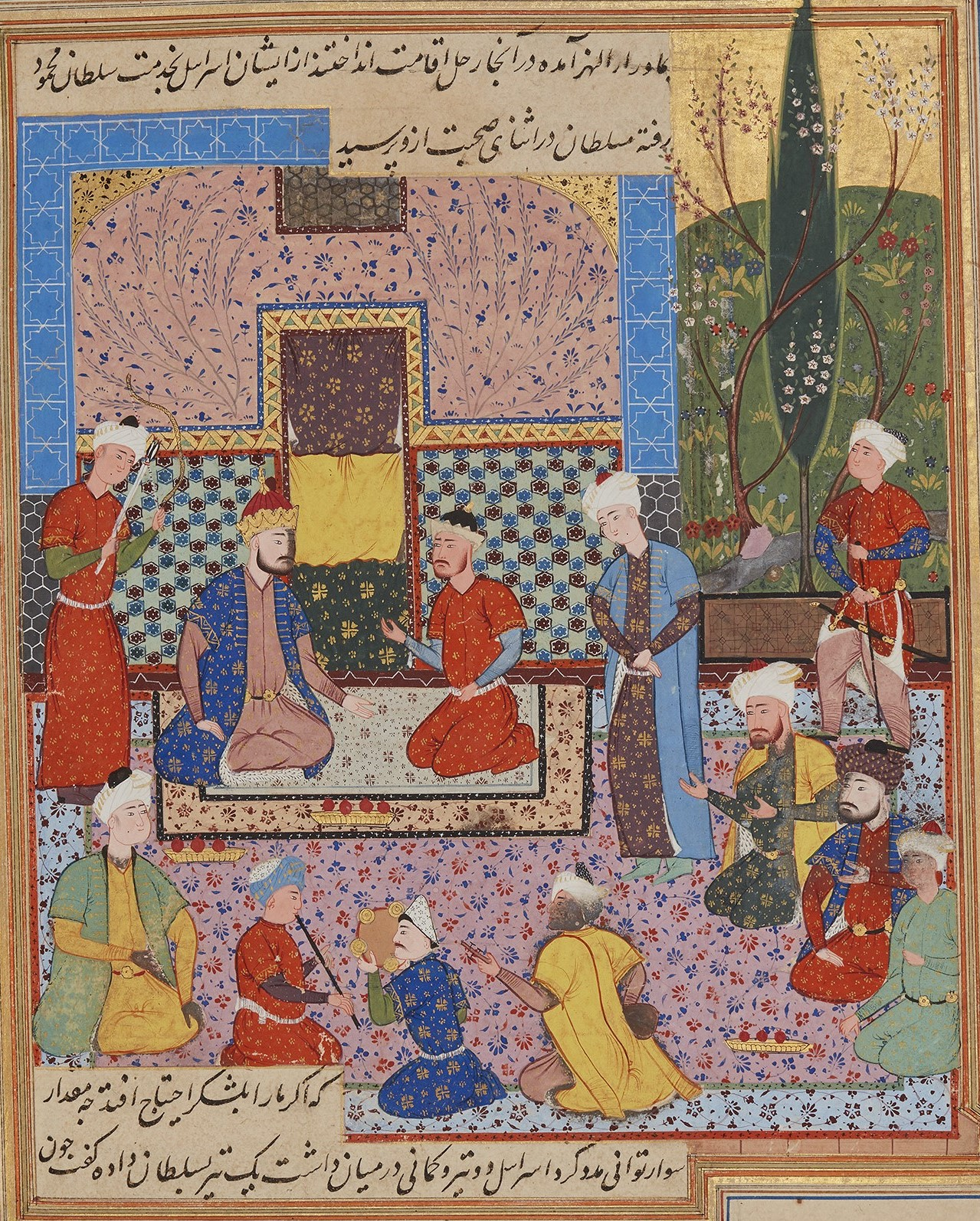
Arslan Isra'il at the court of the Ghaznavid ruler Mahmud of Ghazni. From a manuscript of the Tarikh-e negarestan, dated 1573/1574

Arslan Isra'il, also known as Arslan Yabgu (died 1032) was a Turcoman chieftain, who was from the Kınık tribe, which would later establish the Seljuk Empire. His name Arslan means "the lion". Arslan was son of the warlord Seljuk and uncle to the founders of the Seljuk empire, Chaghri and Tughril.

== Biography ==
=== Background ===
Kınık tribe was one of the Oghuz Turkic tribes. They emerged in the area north of the Seyhun (Syr Darya River). According to some historians, they might be the former vassals of the Khazars. They settled around the city of Jend, which was close to the territory of the Karakhanids, who controlled most of Transoxiana. However they were unruly neighbors. During the Karakhanid - Samanid wars (992) they supported the Samanids instead of the Karakhanids. (Samanids were a Persian state to the south of Amu Darya.) Seljuk, the leader of the tribe, was old and Arslan, one of his sons, distinguished himself during the battles against Karakhanids. Seljuk, died in 1009 and Arslan became the leader of the tribe. Arslan's brother Mikail was father to sultans Tughril and Chaghri, founders of the Seljuk Empire.

=== Political life ===
Karakhanids were defeated by Arslan's forces several times. Arslan also supported Ali Tigin during the Karakhanid civil war. Finally in 1025, Karakhanid sultan Yusuf Kadir met with Mahmud of Ghazni to form a coalition against Kınık. (Ghaznavids were a Turkic clan which had founded an empire in what is now Afghanistan and Pakistan.) The threat was too big for the tribe and Arslan relocated his tribe in the deserts. However, Arslan and his son Qutalmish were taken prisoner by Mahmud. There are two alternative stories of his surrender. According to Jean Paul Roux, he was captured in a battle. But according to Islam Encyclopaedia, Mahmud arrested Arslan by a plot. He invited Arslan for peace talks. During the dinner following the talks, Arslan as well as his son Qutalmish were arrested and the soldiers accompanying them were killed. Mahmud sent Arslan and Qutalmish to Kalinjar Fort (which is now in India).

=== Later years ===
Arslan spent the rest of his life in prison. After Mahmud's death, Arslan's nephew Tughril, and Mahmud's successor Mas'ud I of Ghazni tried to reach an agreement. But the talks failed and Arslan died in prison in 1032.

=== Aftermath ===
Tughril and Chaghri, Arslan's nephews, founded the Seljuk Empire. Qutalmish who had escaped from the prison also participated in the battles. But in later years he competed unsuccessfully for the throne. It was Arslan's grandson Suleyman who founded the Seljuk Sultanate of Rûm.

== Sources ==
- Sevim, A.; Bosworth, C. E. (1996). "The Seljuqs and the Khwarazm Shahs". History of Civilizations of Central Asia, Volume III: The Crossroads of Civilizations: A.D. 250 to 750. Paris: UNESCO. pp. 145–177. ISBN 92-3-103211-9.
- Davidovich, E. A. (1996). "The Karakhanids". History of Civilizations of Central Asia, Volume III: The Crossroads of Civilizations: A.D. 250 to 750. Paris: UNESCO. pp. 119–145. ISBN 92-3-103211-9.
- Bosworth, C. E. (1968). "The Political and Dynastic History of the Iranian World (A.D. 1000–1217)". In Frye, R. N. (ed.). The Cambridge History of Iran, Volume 5: The Saljuq and Mongol periods. Cambridge: Cambridge University Press. pp. 1–202. ISBN 0-521-06936-X.
