= Chaghri Beg =

11th-century Seljuk co-ruler and governor of Khorasan

Chaghri
- Governor of Khorasan (1040–1060)
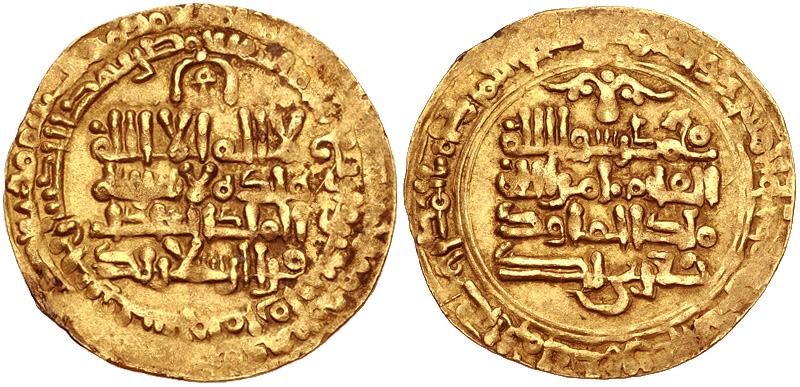
- Gold dinar under Qavurt, citing Chaghri Beg as his overlord. Minted in Jiroft, dated 1056/7
- Born: 989; Khorasan
- Died: 1060; Sarakhs
- Spouse: Farrukh al-Khatuni
- Issue: Alp Arslan; Kavurt; Yaquti; Suleiman; Bahram-Shah; Ilyas; Uthman; Khadija Arslan; Gawhar Khatun; Safiya Khatun
Names
- Kunya: Abu Suleiman; Given name: Dawud; Turkic name: Chaghri-Beg
- House: Seljuk
- Father: Mikail
- Religion: Sunni Islam
- Military career
- Conflicts: Battle of Nasa (1035); Conquest of Nishapur; Conquest of Sarakhs; Battle of Sarakhs (1038); Battle of Nishapur (1038); Battle of Dandanaqan; Campaigns of Khwarazm; Conquest of Balkh; Conquest of Kerman; Conquest of Sistan

Abu Suleiman Dawud Chaghri Beg ibn Mikail, widely known simply as Chaghri Beg (Turkish: Çağrı Bey, 989–1060), Da'ud b. Mika'il b. Saljuq, also spelled Chaghri, was the co-ruler of the early Seljuk Empire. The name Chaghri is Turkic (Çağrı in modern Turkish) and literally means "small falcon", "merlin".

== Background ==
Chaghri and his brother Tughril were the sons of Mikail and the grandsons of Seljuk. The Great Seljuk Empire was named after the latter, who was a Turkic clan leader either in Khazar or Oghuz states. In the early years of the 11th century, they left their former home and moved near the city of Jend (now a village) by the Syr Darya river, where they accepted the suzerainty of the Karakhanids in Transoxania (roughly modern Uzbekistan and southern Kazakhstan). After the defeat of the Karakhanids by Ghaznavids, they were able to gain independence.

== Early Conflicts ==
With the death of Seljuk Beg in 1009 CE, Toghrul and Chaghri Beg took up the administration of Jand. However, they found themselves in a difficult position due to frequent clashes with the Yabugu of Yengikent. Hence, they abandoned Jand in ca. 1016 The Oghuz occupied it soon after.

Arslan Isra'il, the eldest son of Seljuk Beg, after deserting Abu Ibrahim al-Muntasir in a battle in May 1004, had switched allegiance to the Kara-Khanid Khanate. Ali-Tegin, a Karakhanid prince, had rebelled against the rule of his brother, Yusuf Qadir Khan, and occupied Bukhara with the support of Isra'il Tughril and Chaghri Beg also supported Isra'il Thereupon, Qadir Khan sought support from Mahmud of Ghazni. In a punitive expedition in 1025, Qadir Khan and Mahmud joined forces and advanced towards Bukhara Ali Tegin and Isra'il were forced to flee to the Kyzylkum Desert. Mahmud, under the pretext of negotiations, lured Israil, captured him, and then attacked the Seljuk nomad camps. Israil's Seljuks were scattered throughout Transoxiana, and Israil himself was imprisoned in Kalinjar.

With Isra'il gone, Tughril and Chaghri Bey began to claim power over all Seljuk tribes. However, Seljuks of Isra'il did not favour them and approached Mahmud, requesting permission to settle in Khorasan on the grounds that they were oppressed by their commanders in Transoxiana. The sultan agreed, intending to incorporate them as recruits into his army. As a result, approximately four thousand Seljuk families, under their chieftains were permitted to settle on the margins of the desert in the districts of Sarakhs, Farawa, and Abiward where they promised to act as frontier guards. However, the Seljuks became disruptive and began to harass the inhabitants. Mahmud, then defeated and scattered the Seljuks in the battle of Ribat-i-Farawa in 1028.

Ali Tegin reoccupied Bukhara after the departure of Ghaznavid troops, though he was defeated by an army led by Abu Bakr Hisri and Qadir Khan in 1026 and forced into terms. On the other hand, Tughril and Chaghri Beg refused to recognise Ali-Tegin's authority.

== Biography ==
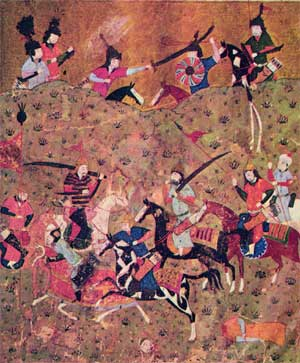
Battle of Dandanaqan

Very little is known of Chaghri and Tughril's lives until 1025. Both were raised by their grandfather Seljuk until they were fifteen and fought with Ali Tigin Bughra Khan, a minor Kara Khanid noble, against Mahmud of Ghazni. The earliest records of Chaghri concern his expeditions in Eastern Anatolia. Although a Ghaznavid governor chased him from his home in Jend to Anatolia, he was able to raid the Byzantine forts in Eastern Anatolia. However, according to Claude Cahen this was highly improbable and of legend.

From 1035 to 1037 Chaghri and Tughril fought against Mas'ud I of Ghazni. Chaghri captured Merv (an important historical city now in Turkmenistan). Between 1038 and 1040 Chaghri fought against the Ghaznavids, usually with hit and run maneuvers and culminating in a major clash at the Battle of Dandanaqan. Tughril was rather hesitant and preferred continuing the hit-and-run attacks, but Chaghri commanded the Seljuk army and preferred direct confrontation. At Dandanaqan, the Seljuks defeated the numerically superior Gaznavid army. A kurultai was held after the battle, by which empire was divided between the two brothers. While Tughril reigned in the west (comprising modern western Iran, Azerbaijan and Iraq), Chaghri reigned in eastern Iran, Turkmenistan, and Afghanistan, a region collectively referred to as Greater Khorasan. Chaghri later also captured Balkh (in modern North Afghanistan). In 1048, he conquered Kerman in South Iran and, in 1056, the Sistan region (south east Iran). After the Seljuks had gained more influence over the Abbasid Caliphate, Chaghri married his daughter, Khadija Arslan Khatun, to the caliph Al-Qa'im in 1056.

== Daughters ==
One of his daughters was Gawhar Khatun. She was married to Erishgi (Erisghen). She was killed on the orders of her nephew Sultan Malik-Shah I in March–April 1075. Another daughter was married to Buyid Abu Mansur Fulad Sutun in 1047–8. Another daughter was Khadija Arslan Khatun. She had been betrothed to Zahir al-Din, son of Abbasid Caliph Al-Qa'im. However, Zahir al-Din died, and Arslan married Al-Qa'im in 1056. After Al-Qa'im's death in 1075, she married the Kakuyid Ali ibn Faramurz, with whom she had a son, Garshasp II. Another daughter was Safiya Khatun. She was married to Kurd Hazarasp ibn Bankir in 1069–70. After his death the same year, she married Uqaylid Sharaf al-Dawla Muslim, with whom, she had a son, Ali. After his death in 1085, she married his brother Ibrahim ibn Quraish.

== Death and legacy ==
Chaghri died in Sarakhs, in North-eastern Iran. The historical sources do not agree on the exact date of his death: years 1059, 1060, 1061 and 1062 were proposed. But it is purported that numismatics can be used to determine the exact death date. Coins were minted in the name of Chaghri up to 1059 and in the name of his son Kavurt after 1060, so Chaghri's death can be ascribed more probably to 1059.

=== Legacy ===
Unlike later Ottoman practice, in earlier Turkic tradition, brothers usually participated in government affairs. Tughril and Chaghri as well as some other members of the family participated in the foundation of the empire. Although Tughril gained the title "sultan", it was Chaghri’s sons who continued it afterwards.

Chaghri had six sons and four daughters. Among his sons, Alp Arslan became the sultan of the Seljukid Empire in 1064. All the remaining members of the Great Seljuk Empire were from Chaghri’s lineage. (Except Seljuks of Rum who were the descendants of Chaghri's cousins). Another son, Kavurt, became the governor of Kerman (which later on became fully independent); a third son, Yaquti, became the governor of Azerbaijan.

=== In popular culture ===
In the 2021 Turkish historical fiction TV series Alparslan: Büyük Selçuklu, Çağrı Bey was portrayed by Turkish actor Erdinç Gülener.

== Bibliography ==
- Lambton, A.K.S. (1988). Continuity and Change in Medieval Persia. Bibliotheca Persica. Bibliotheca Persica. ISBN 978-0-88706-133-2.

Preceded by None	Governor of Khorasan; 1040–1060	Succeeded by Alp Arslan
