= Battle of Sarakhs (1038) =

Battle between the Ghaznavids and Seljuks

- Part of the Seljuk-Ghaznavid Wars
| Date | May 1038 |
| Location | Sarakhs |
| Result | Seljuk victory |

Belligerents
| Ghaznavid Empire | Seljuk Turks |

Commanders and leaders
| Begtoghdi; Subashi | Chaghri Beg; Ibrahim Inal; Tughril Beg |

Strength
| 15,000–25,000 | 12,000–15,000 |

Casualties and losses
| Large amount taken captive | Unknown |

The Battle of Sarakhs took place in 1038 between the Seljuk army under the command of Chaghri Beg, Tughril I, and Ibrahim Inal and the Ghaznavid army under the command of Begtoghdi and Subashi. As a result of the battle, the Ghaznavids were defeated.

When the Ghaznavid sultan Mahmhud returned from India he blamed his general Subashi for events that had occurred during his absence. He ordered Subashi to march against the Seljuks with his army and wage a battle against them.

Subashi marched against the Seljuks. Once the Seljuks had heard of his advance they decided to confront the Ghaznavid army. The two armies met in a day long fight at Sarakhs during which the Tughril Beg and Chaghri Beg inflicted a major defeat against the Ghaznavid general Subashi. The Seljuks captured a large amount of booty and captives. This victory gave the Seljuks complete control over Khorasan.
