= Oghuz Yabgu State =

766–1055 Turkic state in Central Asia

Coordinates: 44°00′N 62°00′E

- 750–1055
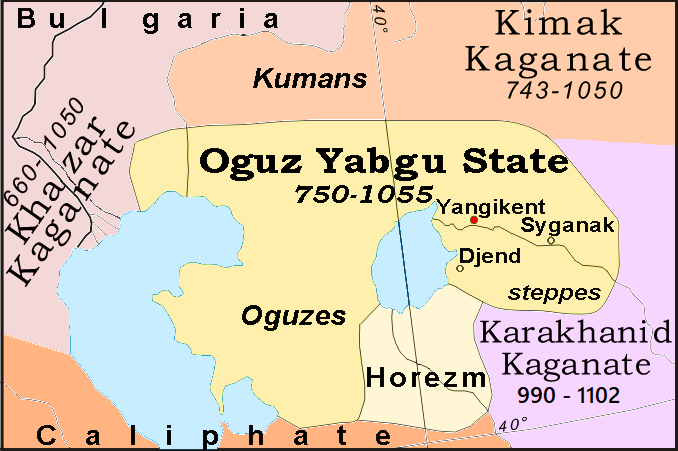
- Oghuz Yabgu State, 750–1055
- Status: Khaganate
- Capital: Yangikent
- Common languages: Turkic
- Ethnic groups: Oghuzes, Kumans, Kangars, Turgeshes
- Religion: Tengriism; Islam (1003–1055)
- Historical era: 8th–11th centuries
  - Established: 750
  - Disestablished: 1055
Preceded by	Succeeded by
Second Turkic Khaganate; Kangar union	Seljuq Empire; Kimek Khanate
- Today part of: Kazakhstan Uzbekistan Turkmenistan

The Oghuz Yabgu State or Oghuz il (Old Turkic: Oghuz Land) was a Turkic state, founded by Oghuz Turks in 750, located geographically in an area between the coasts of the Caspian and Aral Seas. Oghuz tribes occupied a vast territory in Kazakhstan along the Irgiz, Yaik, Emba, and Uil rivers, the Aral Sea area, the Syr Darya valley, the foothills of the Karatau Mountains in Tien-Shan, and the Chui River valley (see map). The Oghuz political association developed in the 9th and 10th centuries in the basin of the middle and lower course of the Syr Darya and adjoining the modern western Kazakhstan steppes.

== Etymology ==
The etymology of the name "Oghuz" is unclear. It was discussed many times in historical and philological literature. The term probably means "tribes", or the "tribal union", and then could turn into a collective ethnic name.

By the 10th century, Islamic sources were calling them Muslim Turkmens, as opposed to those of Tengrist or Buddhist religion; and by the 12th century this term was adopted into Byzantine usage, as the Oghuzes were overwhelmingly Muslim. The name "Oghuz" fell out of use by 13th century.

The original Oghuz areas were the southeastern regions of Central Asia. The beginning of the early Oghuz group formation is linked to the Western Zhetysu (often known, in Russian and other European languages, as Semirechye).

== History ==
=== Early history ===
The first reference to the Oghuz State is by the Arab geographer Yaqubi, who mentioned the Oghuz's wars against the Toquz Oghuz, Kimeks, and Karluks; another geographer, Ibn al-Faqih, reported that the Oghuzes along with the Kimeks and Toguz Oghuzes were the "kings" (malik), and were revered among the Turks. In Zhetysu the old Oghuz capital was Guziya.

The Chinese sources, dated to the 7th and 8th centuries, located the 姑蘇 Gūsū (a Western Turkic tribe not belonging to the "Ten Arrows" Union) consistently in the vicinity of Issyk Kul – Talas; Yury Zuev (1960) links these Gusu to the Oghuz Turks. The center of the Oghuz confederation shifted from the Issyk Kul area to the lower course of the Syr Darya under pressure of the refugees of the Sary Turgesh tribe. Zuev also notes two parallel passages: one from Venus' Secret Classic (Taibo Yinjing 太白陰經) which mentioned the 三屈 "Three Qu" (< MC *k^{(h)}ɨut̚) (Note: distinguished from the 十箭 Shí Jiàn "Ten Arrows" (OTrk 𐰆𐰣:𐰸 On Oq) and Jĭu Xìng "Nine Surnames" (OTrk 𐱃𐰸𐰆𐰔:𐰆𐰍𐰔 Toquz Oğuz)), and the other from Al-Masudi's Meadows of Gold and Mines of Gems, which mentioned the three hordes of the Turkic Ġuz.

Despite the similarity in name, Golden contends that the Toquz Oghuz (Chinese: 九姓 Jĭu Xìng "Nine Surnames"), from whom emerged the Uyghurs, were not the same people as the Oghuz who founded the Oghuz Yabgu state in Transoxiana. because Istakhri and Muhammad ibn Muhmad al-Tusi kept the Toquz Oghuz and Oghuz distinct and Ibn al-Faqih mentioned "the infidel Turk-Oghuz, the Toquz-Oghuz, and the Qarluq" Even so, Golden notes the confusion in Latter Göktürks and Uyghurs, where Oghuz apparently referred to Toquz Oghuz or another tribal grouping, who were also named Oghuz without a prefixed numeral; this confusion is also reflected in Habash al-Hasib al-Marwazi, who listed 12 Oghuz tribes, who were ruled by a "Toquz Khaqan" and some of whom were Toquz-Oghuz, on the border of Transoxiana and Khwarazm. At most, the Oghuz were possibly led by a core group of Toquz Oghuz clans or tribes.

In 766, after Karluks overran the Türgesh Khaganate in Zhetysu (southeastern modern Kazakhstan), Karluk tribes formed a Khanate centered there under the rule of a Yabgu, and they occupied and transferred their capital to Suyab. By that time the bulk of the Uch-Karluk (Three Karluks) confederation had left the Altai, and the supremacy in Zhetysu passed to the Karluk tribes. After the Oghuz confederation lost a struggle with the Karluks for leadership in the Turgesh Kaganate, a significant part of the Zhetysu Oghuzes migrated to the Karatau Mountains foothills and the valley of the Chu River in the Issyk Kul basin.

At the beginning of the 9th century, the Oghuz confederation, in alliance with Karluks and Kimek tribe destroyed the Kangar union and captured the lower course of the Syr Darya river and the Aral steppes, displacing the Kangars and Pechenegs. The nomadic tribes of the Syr Darya Kangars were forced to join the Oghuzes, and a part of them migrated to the west to the northern Black Sea region. The Oghuzes moved their capital to Yangikent and became known as Oghuz Yabgu State.

The state was founded in Eni-Kent which was an Oghuz yayla (summer village). Oghuz il extended from "Issyk Kul and Almalyk, in the south, to Sairam, in the west, to the city of Yangikent, which stands at the mouth of the river Syr (Syr-darya), and to the Kara-Kum (desert)". The capital of the Oghuz il was variously spelt Eni-Kent, Yangikent, Djanikand, Yenikent, Yanikand, all meaning New City, and also in Arabic literature al-Kariya al-Hadisa and in Persian literature Deh-i Hay; presently it is a Central Asian ghost town Jankent.

The state was ruled by the leader of the Oghuz Turks with the title Yabgu, which is similar to other Turkic ruling titles such as Khan and Kagan/Hakan, but initially with a status below Khagan. The army was commanded by Subaşı, "sü" meaning "army" (possibly from Late Old Chinese 戍 śwò "frontier guard") and "başı" "head > ruler".

=== Political history ===
The Oghuz Yabgus and contemporary Asian polities circa 1000.

The Oghuz State played an important role in the military and political history of Eurasia. In 965 the Oghuz State allied with Kievan Rus in a war against the Khazar Kaganate. In 985 the alliance with Kievan Rus defeated Volga Bulgaria, which increased the political power of the Oghuz State.

At the turn of the 10th–11th centuries, popular uprisings broke out against excessive taxation in the state. The revolts became especially strong in the second half of the 10th century, during the rule of Ali Yabgu. The split between the ruling Oghuzes and Seljuk branch of Oghuzes turned out to be detrimental to the state. The upheaval was used by the Seljuk branch, who led an uprising and took Jend, but soon they were forced to leave the Jend area.

During the reign of the last Oghuz Yabgu Shahmalik the state rebounded. In 1041 Shahmalik Yabgu conquered Khorezm from the Ghaznavids, but two years later he was captured by the Seljuk forces and executed. Shahmalik Yabgu was the last ruler of the Oghuz State.

Internal turmoil and conflict with the Seljuks weakened the Oghuz State. The weakened state fell under attacks by the Kipchak tribes from the Kimak Kaganate. Under the pressure of the Kipchaks, the two branches of the Oghuz people split; a significant part of the Oghuzes went to Eastern Europe, and the Seljuk Oghuzes left toward Asia Minor. Another part of the Oghuzes fell under the rule of the Karahanids and Seljuk rulers of Khorasan. The remnants of those Oghuz defeated by the Kipchaks subsequently dissolved among the Turkic-speaking tribes of Dasht-i Kipchak. The Oghuz tribes contributed to the formation of many of today's Turkic peoples.

In the 11th century, Oghuz migration to Persia and the Near East began. The movement was led by the head of the Kınık tribe Tughril and Chaghri Beg, the grandchildren of Seljuk. This migrating group became, in time, the Seljuk Empire. In 1025, a part of the Seljuks settled in the territory of the modern Turkmenistan, centered on the city of Nysa. In 1034–1035, they were joined by Togrul bek's subjects. In 1038–1040, the Seljuks fought against Ghaznavids and captured Nishapur. Subsequently, they were able to create a huge state, which consisted of Asia Minor, Persia, and parts of the Caucasus and Central Asia.

The Oghuz Il state existed for three centuries. Another Turkic group, Kipchaks and Kimeks of the Kimek Kaganate, ended the state by the 12th century. By that time, Selçuk Bey and his Kınık (tribe) headed to Persia to found their own Muslim state, which in the future would become the Great Seljuq Empire, and a part of the state population moved eastward to the N.Pontic areas.

=== Oghuz Yabgu state on the Syr Darya ===
The above is mostly an account of the Oghuz as a whole. "State" is misleading for a group of loosely organised tribes. Bregel has the following for one group. When the Oghuz drove the Pechenegs out of the Syr Darya delta a leader from the Barani clan took the title of yabghu. How far his power extended is not clear. His capital or winter camp was at Yangikent (=new-town) where the Syr Darya made its last split. Around 985 one of his commanders named Seljuk split off and moved to Jend south of the upper delta and converted to Islam. His followers became the Seljuks. The yabghu converted a little later. In 1034–1035 yabghu Shah Malik Barani defeated the Seljuks and Turkomans of Khwarezm which caused many Turkomans to move south to Khorasan and the Kopet Dagh. In 1041, Shah Malik conquered Khwarezm after a three-day battle. The Seljuks drove him out in 1043. He fled and was later killed, his "state" perhaps disappearing.

== Political system ==
The economic base of society was private ownership of livestock. Little is known about the old farming communities in the oases, river valleys, and wetlands. The cities continued to be populated by traders and artisans.

The title of the elected ruler was Yabgu. The power was hereditary within a ruling clan. The heir to the throne was called Inal, they were brought up by an Atabek tutor. Elections of Yabgu were conducted at the tribal assemblies. The rulers were chosen by the codex of unwritten rules of customary law – "tore", from the most powerful clans. The power of the supreme ruler was limited by the council of the largest military-tribal aristocracy. The wives of the rulers bore the title "Khatun" and played a significant role in the court life. Yabgu was assisted by regional rulers titled Kul-Eerkins. An important place was occupied by warlords. A head of the army was called Subashi, from su – army and bash – head. The Subashi was supported by a military council and actively interfered in political events.

The Oghuz States were subdivided into uruks and aimaks. The term uruk designated tribal divisions, and aimak was an administrative district. The clans and tribes united into larger tribal alliances were known as il (country). By the end of the 10th century formed a formal administrative apparatus and a system of regular taxes.

The main religion was the traditional Tengrism. They converted to Islam in 1003 AD.

== Ethnic composition ==
The powerbase of the Oghuz State were semi-nomadic and nomadic tribes of Zhetysu and Siberia: Yughra, Charuk, Khalaj, Kimek, Karluk, Imur, Bayandur, Kai, and the remaining tribes and sedentary population of the Kangar Union that submitted to the Oghuz Yabgu.

According to the 11th century treatise Dīwān Lughāt al-Turk by Karakhanid scholar Mahmud Kashgari (b. 1005 – d. 1102), the Oghuz confederation had originally consisted of 24 tribes, though two Khalaj tribes left the union early, leaving 22, whom Kashgari named. Sharaf al-Zaman al-Marwazi (fl. 1056/1057 – 1124/1125 CE), a near-contemporary of Kashgari, mentioned only 12 Oghuz tribes. Later sources like Rashid-al-Din, Abu al-Ghazi Bahadur, and Selçukname omitted Charuklug from Kashgari's list, added Kizik, Karkin, and Yaparli, and divided the 24 tribes neatly into two 12-tribe group" Buzuks or Bazouk (Turkic and Turkmen: Bozoklar – Grey Arrows), and Uchuks (Turkic and Turkmen: Üçoklar – Three Arrows). The Buzuk wing had a privileged status. The discrepancy between the sources probably resulted from the Oghuz division into two exogamous parts, Buzuks and Uchuks belonging respectively to the right and the left wing of their army. Oghuz States also had the "Uruk" and "Aimags". The term "Uruk" designated tribal divisions. Clans and tribes united into larger tribal alliances, were known as "il" (the country).

== Yabgus ==
(Approximately from 600 to 1042)

Capital: Yangikent;

1. Inal Yavi (c. 600) ;
2. Duyli Kai, son ;
3. Irqi (Irqin), son ;
4. Tuman, son ;
5. Qanli Yavi, son ;
6. Mur Yavi, son ;
7. Qara khan (?), son ;
8. Bughra khan (?), son ;
9. Quzitekin, son ;
10. Arslan, son ;
11. Usman, son ;
12. Isli, son.
13. Shaiban (Shiban), son ;
14. Buran, son ;
15. Ali khan, son (c. 980–998) ;
16. Shah Malik (998–1042) ;

Conquest of Khwarazm in 1042.

== Bibliography ==
- Kusainova M.A., 2006, History of Kazakhstan, Shyn Kіtap, ISBN 9965-9784-4-1 (Кусаинова М.А., 2006, История Казахстана, Шың Кітап) in Russian.
- Fisher, William Bayne; Boyle, J. A. (1968). The Cambridge History of Iran. Cambridge University Press. ISBN 978-0-521-06936-6.

Preceded by Jeti-su Oghuz confederation	Oghuz Il state 8 c. – 12 c.	Succeeded by Seljuq Empire
