= Seljuk (leader) =

Eponymous founder of the Seljuk dynasty

- Bey
- Died: c. 1007 or 1009 (age 100/107); Jand
- Burial: Unknown, possibly near Jand, Kazakhstan
- Issue: Arslan Isra'il; Mikail Yabghu; Musa Yabghu; Israfil Yabghu
- House: Seljuk dynasty
- Father: Tuqaq
- Religion: Islam (Sunni) (from 985); Previously: Tengrism

Seljuk (died c. 1007 or 1009), variously romanized, was an Oghuz Turk warlord. He was the eponymous founder of the Seljuk dynasty.

== Name ==
The leader of the Seljuks personal name is Selçuk (/sɛl.tʃʰuk/) in modern Turkish, a name sometimes anglicized to Selcuk. His name varies in different sources and languages. The form سلجك (Selcuk or Selcük, /seldʒuk/ or /seldʒyk/) appears in Mahmud al-Kashgari's 1072–1074 Karakhanid Turkish Dīwān Lughāt al-Turk and in the anonymous 13th–15th-century Old Anatolian Turkish Book of Dede Korkut. His name is spelled in Arabic and Persian sources as سلجوك, سلجك, سلچوق, سلجوق, and سلجق. Romanizations include Seljuk (/sɛl.dʒək/ or /dʒuk/), Seljuq, Selcük, Seldjuk, Seldjuq, and Saljūq. His name is sometimes given the title bey, also variously romanized.

There are different theories about the etymology of Seljuk:

- selçük, meaning "small flood"
- salçuk, meaning "little raft"
- salçığ, meaning "disputant"

According to Caferoğlu, the name was derived from the root sil- in Old Uyghur, meaning "clean". Although, the root of sil- was transformed as i > e, and that the name was created by adding the diminutive of -çük. The meaning of the word could be interpreted as "pure", "clean", "honest" and "a man of his word". It is argued that it was a unisex name, given both to boys as well as girls in the past and that some of these traits were sought in women, thus it would make more sense to name girls after some of these qualities.

According to Hungarian Turkologist László Rásonyi, his name should be read as Selcik. Josef Markwart proposed that the name should be read as Salçuk. Peter Benjamin Golden suggested the vocalization Salçuq ~ Saljuq, based on the Islamic and Syriac transcriptions sljwq and saw a connection with root sal- "to move (something), to put into motion with some implication of violent motion", an etymology consistent with contemporary Turkic anthroponymy.

== Life ==
=== Origin ===
Seljuk was the son of Tuqaq or Tuqaq Beg (دوقاق دمور یالیق Dûqâq Demur Yalığ), known as Temür Yalığ (meaning "iron bow") because of his skills in his works. In Oghuz culture, arrow and bow are considered as a sign of sovereignty and considering Duqaq's nickname, he wasn't an ordinary soldier, but a sü-başı (commander-in-chief). According to various sources, Duqaq was a powerful statesman and possessed great power and influence in the Oghuz Yabgu State and died around 924.

=== Immigration to Jand ===
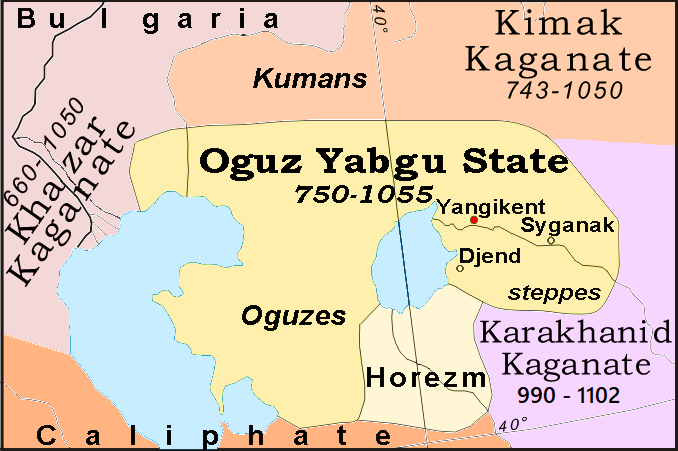
Oghuz Yabgu (750-1055 AD)

Seljuk had great power and influence among the people of his tribe who lived within the territory of the Oghuz Yabgu State. The relationship between Seljuk and Oghuz Yabgu was overshadowed by an incident that is not well known because of lack of reliable sources. Nonetheless, Seljuk left the Oghuz Yabgu State and immigrated with his tribe, to the town of Jand, located on the left bank of the Syr Darya. It is rumored that there were 100 horseman, 1,500 camels and 50,000 sheep with Seljuk Beg during this migration. If each horseman equates to a family, the Seljuks who migrated to Jand were likely a small nomadic community of about 500 people.

Jand was an important border town in the steppes during the X to XIII centuries. This town, inhabited by both nomadic and sedentary people, served as gateway to the steppes. Jand was a relatively popular destination for Muslims and religious propagandists from Transoxiana as well as merchants from various places. There, Seljuk and his Oghuz tribe accepted Islam. This event took place after Seljuk had migrated to Jand in 985-986, and before Seljuk left for Transoxiana to help the Samanians in 992. Clifford Edmund Bosworth suggests that the conversation of Seljuk and his family occurred through the contact of the Samanids. Arslan Israil bin Seljuk helped the Samanids against the Kara-Khanid Khanate in that year.

After accepting Islam, Seljuk expelled the officials sent by the Oghuz Yabgu to Jand to collect the annual tax, saying "Muslims will not pay tribute to the unbelievers", and set up a war against the non-Muslim Turks. This may well be proved by Al-Bayhaqi who calls Seljuk Beg as al-Malik al-Ghâzî Seljuk (meaning "ruler and religious fighter Seljuk").

The most important event that took place during this period was the death of Seljuk's elder son Mikâ'îl, who was the father of Tughrul Beg and Chaghri Beg, founders of the Great Seljuk Empire. After this incident, the wife of Mikâ'îl (Tughril and Chaghri's mother) married Yusuf, the other son of Seljuk. According to the old Turkic traditions (the reason for such a tradition was that someone could use a widowed noblewoman to gain strength among the tribe/country), while two of his sons, Tughrul and Chaghri, were raised by their grandfather Seljuk Beg.

=== Relations with Samanids ===
Map of Khorasan and Transoxiana.

Seljuk, who gained power with his war activities in Jand and its vicinity, gradually became involved in politics in Transoxiana. After the Kara-Khanid ruler Hasan b. Sulayman Bughra Khan captured the Samanid city of Bukhara, the Samanids asked Seljuk for aid against Bughra Khan. Upon this, Seljuk sent his eldest son Arslân (Isrâ'il) to Transoxiana.

Since Seljuk was getting old in this period, the administration was now actually in the hands of Arslân. In the meantime, the Samanid state, which thoroughly lost its power, was subjected to frequent renewed attacks by the Kara-Khanids, which gave Arslan the opportunity to prove his military prowess. In a period when the Samanid state was shaken by the internal turmoil caused by Fâ'ik, Abû 'Alî Simcûr, and Bek-tüzün, and the Kara-Khanids who entered Transoxiana and seized Bukhara for the second time (999), the Seljuks under Arslân provided military assistance to Abû İbrâhîm İsma'îl al-Muntasir (1000–1005), the last member of the Samanid dynasty in 1004. Although al-Muntasir gained some success against the Kara-khanid army under the command of Ilig Khan Nasr with the support he received from the Seljuks, he couldn't prevent the collapse of the Samanid state. Arslan himself was taken prisoner in 1025 by Mahmud of Ghazni. After this incident, all of Transoxiana came under the Kara-Khanid rule and the Seljuks had to submit to the Kara-Khanids.

=== Relation with Khazars ===
It is speculated that according to some sources, Seljuk began his career as an officer in the Khazar army. These sources provide information about the ancestors of the Seljuks, records that Duqaq is connected to Khazar Melik. The fact that these records, which appear ambiguous in Melik-nâme, was repeated by Ibn Hassûl who wrote his work during the time of Tughrul Beg, does not leave any doubt about the Seljuk's relationship with the Khazars. Due to a lack of resources, it is not possible to reveal the nature of this relationship nor to fully define its framework, yet it is difficult to say whether this relationship was done via Oghuz Yabgu state or independent. However, if political contact has been established between the ancestors of the Seljuks and the Khazars, the most appropriate date for this must be the middle of the second quarter of the X. century, when the Khazar Khaganate needed military help. As a result, it is possible that Duqaq had political and military relations with the Khazars during their collapse either directly or through the Oghuz Yabgu State, and that these memories could only be spoken verbally in the family reflect only the vague records of the Seljuk histories written about one hundred and fifty years later.

=== Founding of the Seljuk dynasty ===
Under Mikâîl's sons Tughrul and Chaghri, the Seljuks migrated into Khurasan. Ghaznavid attempts to stop Seljuks raiding the local Muslim populace led to the Battle of Dandanaqan on 23 May 1040. Victorious Seljuks became masters of Khurasan, expanding their power into Transoxiana and across Iran. By 1055, Tuğrul had expanded his control all the way to Baghdad, setting himself up as the champion of the Abbasid caliph, who honored him with the title sultan. Earlier rulers may have used this title but the Seljuks seem to have been the first to inscribe it on their coins.

=== Death ===
Seljuk Beg died in Jand at the age of about a hundred towards the year 1009. After his death, Arslân, one of his three surviving sons, took over the administration under the old Oghuz traditions. His son Arslân, who had the title of yabgu, was assisted by Yusuf, who had the title of inal and Mûsâ, who had the title of inanç from his brothers. Meanwhile, Mikâ'îl's sons Tughrul and Chaghri took their place in the administration as "beg" at the age of 14-15. Although Arslan Yabgu was the head of the family, the sons and grandchildren of Seljuk ruled the Turkoman Begs and other forces affiliated to them in a semi-connected manner in the line with the old Oghuz traditions.

== Family ==
According to various sources, Seljuk had four or five sons: Isrâ'îl (Israel, Arslân), Mikâ'îl (Michael), Mûsâ (Moses), Yusuf (Joseph) and/or Yûnus (Jonah). All five names mentioned are related to Judaism. Some researchers who pointed out the religious status of the names have concluded that the Seljuk family was either Khazar Judaic or Nestorian Christian before accepting Islam. However, given that the names of these individuals are widely used in the Islamic world, Turkish historians state that such an interpretation cannot be solely based on names.
