= Rustam Dushmanziyar =

Rustam Dushmanziyar (Persian: رستم دشمنزار) was a Daylamite aristocrat and the ancestor of the Kakuyid dynasty. His personal name was Rustam, but was known as Dushmanziyar, which is the Daylami version of the Persian word Dushmanzar ("he who brings grief to his enemy").

== Biography ==
Rustam was the brother of the wife of the Buyid ruler Fakhr al-Dawla, Sayyida Shirin, who was sister, or more likely, the niece of the Bavandid ruler al-Marzuban. Rustam had a son named Muhammad ibn Rustam Dushmanziyar, who would later establish the Kakuyid dynasty of Isfahan.

Rustam, because of his great service to Fakhr al-Dawla, was rewarded with land in Alborz in appreciation of his services. His duty was to protect Ray and northern Jibal against the local leaders from Tabaristan. He later died at an unknown date before 1007, which was the date Muhammad ibn Rustam Dushmanziyar established the Kakuyid dynasty.

== Sources ==
- Bosworth, C. Edmund (2010). "KĀKUYIDS". In Yarshater, Ehsan (ed.). Encyclopædia Iranica. Vol. XV/4: Kafir Kala–Ḵamsa of Jamāli. London and New York: Routledge & Kegan Paul. pp. 359–362. ISBN 978-1-934283-26-4.
- Bosworth, C. Edmund (1984). "ʿALĀʾ-AL-DAWLA MOḤAMMAD". In Yarshater, Ehsan (ed.). Encyclopædia Iranica. Vol. I/7: Ahriman–Alafrank. London and New York: Routledge & Kegan Paul. pp. 773–774. ISBN 978-0-71009-096-6.
- Huart, CL. (1993). "Kākōyids". E.J. Brill's First Encyclopaedia of Islam, Volume IIII. Leiden: BRILL. pp. 667–668. ISBN 9789004097902.
- Kennedy, Hugh (2004). The Prophet and the Age of the Caliphates: The Islamic Near East from the 6th to the 11th Century (Second ed.). Harlow: Longman. ISBN 978-0-582-40525-7.
- Madelung, W. (1975). "The Minor Dynasties of Northern Iran". In Frye, Richard N. (ed.). The Cambridge History of Iran. Vol. 4. Cambridge: Cambridge University Press. pp. 198–249. ISBN 0-521-20093-8.
- Madelung, W.; Wolfgang, F. (1986). "KĀKUYIDS". In Yarshater, Ehsan (ed.). Encyclopædia Iranica. Vol. II/4: Architecture IV–Armenia and Iran IV. London and New York: Routledge & Kegan Paul. pp. 342–347. ISBN 978-0-71009-104-8.
