= Faramurz =

Kakuyid Emir of Isfahan

- Emir of the Kakuyid dynasty
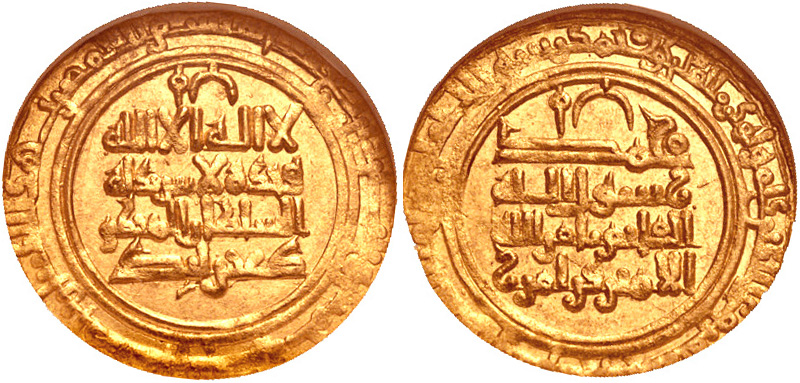
- Reign: 1041 – ca. 1070
- Predecessor: Muhammad ibn Rustam Dushmanziyar
- Successor: Ali ibn Faramurz
- Born: Unknown; Iran
- Died: ca. 1070; Yazd or Abarkuh
- House: Kakuyid
- Father: Muhammad ibn Rustam Dushmanziyar
- Religion: Islam

Abu Mansur Faramurz (Persian: ابو منصور فرامرز), mostly known as Faramurz, was the Kakuyid Emir of Isfahan. He was the eldest son of Muhammad ibn Rustam Dushmanziyar. In 1051, He was defeated by Tughril, sultan of the Seljuk Empire, and became his vassal. Faramurz later died after 1063, probably in the 1070s.

== Reign ==
=== Independent rule ===
In 1037, Muhammad ibn Rustam strengthened the defenses of Isfahan to protect it from the plundering Turkmen nomads from Khorasan. In 1041, after the defeat of the Ghaznavids by the Seljuqs at the battle of Dandanaqan, the Seljuqs became neighbors with the Kakuyids. After defeating the Ghaznavids, their leader, Tughril, made Ray the capital of his kingdom.

Four years later, Faramurz succeeded his father, Muhammad, in Isfahan, while Muhammad's younger son Garshasp I took power in Hamadan as a vassal king of his brother. The third son of Muhammad, Abu Harb, however, rebelled against his older brother and called upon help from the Buyids of Fars. The rebel brother was, however, defeated by Faramurz.

Relations with Faramurz and Tughril had high importance. It seems that Faramurz was present with the Seljuqs at the battle of Dandanaqan against the Ghaznavids. When Faramurz ascended to the Kakuyid throne, Tughril secured his allegiance by sending a tribute of payment to Faramurz. However, neither Faramurz nor his brother Garshasp I were willing to turn to the side of Seljuqs.

In 1044, Faramurz conquered a few cities in Kirman from the Buyid Abu Kalijar, but he shortly made a counter-attack against him, reconquering parts of Kirman and capturing Abarquh. The next year, the Dailamites and Kurds of Jibal made a stand together to resist the advance of the Turkmens from Khorasan. The following year Tughril arrived to Isfahan. Faramurz then submitted himself to the Seljuqs. Around 1045–46, after Tughril's return to Khorasan, Faramurz declared himself independent of Seljuq rule, and submitted to the Buyids, forcing Tughril to return to Isfahan, where he defeated the Kakuyids, and made Faramurz his vassal once again.

In 1050, Tughril laid siege to Isfahan. The people of Isfahan defended the city bravely against the Seljuqs but after a year they finally surrendered. The walls of Isfahan were razed, and Tughril then made the city his capital.

=== Seljuq suzerainty ===
Faramurz was then appointed as the ruler Yazd and Abarkuh in compensation for the loss of Isfahan. Both of these towns which he controlled, had already been under Kakuyid control. Although he lost almost all power, Faramurz was highly respected at the Seljuq court, where he was awarded with the title of "Shams al-Mulk" (Sun of royalty) twice in 1061 and 1063. During this period, he was part of the Seljuq delegation to Baghdad, where he went with the Seljuq vizier Al-Kunduri and Tughril himself to organize the wedding of the Seljuq king with the daughter of Abbasid Caliph Al-Qa'im. After that, nothing more is known about Faramurz, and he probably died soon after. He was succeeded by his son Ali ibn Faramurz, who later married one of Chaghri Beg's daughters.

== Bibliography ==
- Bosworth, C. E. (1968). "The Political and Dynastic History of the Iranian World (A.D. 1000–1217)". In Frye, R. N. (ed.). The Cambridge History of Iran, Volume 5: The Saljuq and Mongol periods. Cambridge: Cambridge University Press. pp. 1–202. ISBN 0-521-06936-X.
- Janine and Dominique Sourdel, Historical Dictionary of Islam, Éd. PUF, ISBN 978-2-13-054536-1, article Kakuyids, pp. 452–453.
- Bosworth, C. Edmund (1998). "KĀKUYIDS". Encyclopaedia Iranica, Vol. XV, Fasc. 4. London et al. pp. 359–362.
- Bosworth, C. Edmund (1983). "ABŪ MANṢŪR FARĀMARZ". ABŪ MANṢŪR FARĀMARZ. Encyclopaedia Iranica, Vol. I, Fasc. 3. London et al. pp. 335–336. Archived from the original on 2013-11-10.

Preceded by Muhammad ibn Rustam Dushmanziyar	Kakuyid Emir of Isfahan; 1041 – 1051	Succeeded by Seljuq conquest
Preceded by Muhammad ibn Rustam Dushmanziyar	Kakuyid Emir of Yazd and Abarkuh; 1041 – ca. 1070	Succeeded by Ali ibn Faramurz
