= Battle of Saveh =

- Part of Seljuk civil war (1119)
Date	11 August 1119
Location	Saveh, Seljuk Empire (in modern-day Iran)
Result	Sanjar's victory

Belligerents
Mahmud II's supporters: Bursuqids; Bakjiyyah tribes; Banu Mazyad; Emirate of Fars	Ahmad Sanjar's supporters: Emirate of Yazd; Nasrid dynasty; State of Khawarezm

Commanders and leaders
Mahmud II; Ali ibn Umar, Hajib of the Sultan; Ghazaghli, Atabeg of the Sultan (executed); Mansour ibn Sadaqa; Emir Mankubars; Sunqur al-Bukhari; Qarajah al-Saqi, Emir of Fars	Ahmad Sanjar; Emir Unar; Garshasp II, Emir of Yazd; Taj al-Din II Nasr ibn Khalaf, Malik of Sistan; Muhammad I, Shah of Khawarezm; Emir Qumaj

Strength
30,000 cavalry	20,000 cavalry 18-45 war elephant

Battle of Saveh, was a pitched battle fought on 11 August 1119, near the town of Saveh, located close to the city of Ray, between the Great Seljuk Sultan Mahmud II and his uncle, Sultan Sanjar.

== Background ==
After the death of the Great Seljuk Sultan, Muhammad I Tapar, his son Mahmud, who succeeded him, failed to establish full control over the throne and faced conflicts with his brother Toghril. Aware of this situation, Sanjar, Malik of Khorasan, declared himself sultan on 14 June 1118, following a week-long mourning period for Muhammad Tapar, and began preparations for a western campaign.

Upon learning that his uncle was mobilizing an army for a campaign to the west, Sultan Mahmud sent envoys led by Sharaf al-Din Anushurwan ibn Khalid and Fakhr al-Mulk Tughayerk ibn al-Yazan to seek a reconciliation, but they achieved no result, and when they told Sanjar to not start a war, he responded: My nephew is a boy, the vizier and hajib are using him to control me.

=== Sanjar-Mahmud war ===
Advancing westward, Sultan Sanjar's vanguard numbering, 5,000 cavarly, led by an emir naemed Anar, arrived at Gorgan. Sultan Mahmud, having received news of his uncle's advance, gathered his own army of 10,000 cavalry, and sent it under the leadership of his hajib, Ali ibn Umar. When Ali approached Gorgan, he sent to Anar a message regarding Sultan Muhammad's injunction, which stipulated that Sanjar was to be accorded due honor and his orders obeyed, yet with the understanding that he would protect Sultan Mahmud, then he sent another message informing him that he could easily defeat him. When Emir Anar withdrew, some of Sultan Mahmud's troops pursued him, plundered a portion of the farmlands, and captured some of his soldiers.

Sultan Mahmud arrived at Ray, where Ali ibn Umar and the army rejoined him; Mahmud thanked the hajib for driving away Anar and commended both him and the troops. Although his advisors urged him to remain in Ray to prevent the Seljuks of Khorasan from crossing the border and attacking his territories, he grew restless and departed for Gorgan. There, he was joined by Emir Mankubars, accompanied by ten thousand horsemen from Iraq, as well as Mansur ibn Sadaqa al-Mazyadi, the Bakjiyyah emirs, and others. Sultan Mahmud subsequently headed toward Hamadan, where his vizier, al-Rabib, passed away; he appointed Abu Talib al-Sumayrami as his successor. Meanwhile, Ghazghali, the Sultan's atabeg, committed acts of oppression against the inhabitants of Hamadan. Seizing the opportunity presented by Mahmud's departure, Sanjar advanced into Persia and captured Ray. Garshasp II, Emir of Yazd, brother-in-law to Sanjar, and the husband of Mahmud's paternal aunt, had defected to Sanjar's side; this was because Sultan Mahmud had granted Garshasp's lands to Quraja al-Saqi, Emir of Fars, as punishment for arriving late to the pledge of allegiance. With Garshasp's assistance, Sanjar gained intelligence regarding the region, its routes, and the state of its emirs. Upon learning of this, Sultan Mahmud set out to confront him. Eight days prior to the actual encounter, forces from Sultan Mahmud's army reached the water sources ahead of the main body and seized control of them.

== Battle ==
The two armies clashed near Saveh, in the vicinity of the city of Ray. Sultan Sanjar's army consisted of 20,000 soldiers and between 18 and 45 elephants, the biggest of them named "Bahdhou". The army was led by commanders such as Abu'l-Fadl Taj al-Din Nasr ibn Khalaf, Emir of Sistan, Muhammad Khwarazm-Shah, Emir Anar, Emir Qumaj, and Garshasp II, Emir of Yazd. Sultan Mahmud II's army comprised 30,000 soldiers under commanders such as Hajib Ali ibn Umar, Atabeg Ghazaghli, Menkubars, Sunqur al-Bukhari, Qaraja al-Saki, Emir of Fars, and the Bursuqids of Hamadan. Early in the battle, Sultan Mahmud II's army gained the upper hand due to its numerical superiority; his forces routed the units on the right and left flanks of Sultan Sanjar's army. Following the collapse of his flanks, Sultan Sanjar ordered his elephants to be brought into the fray. Once the elephants joined the battle, Sultan Mahmud II's army was routed, and Atabeg Ghazaghli was captured and executed, and despite the attack's success, Sanjar commanded it stopped, out of fear for Mahmud's safety.

== Aftermath ==
Sultan Mahmud II fled to Isfahan with his accompanying emirs, while Sultan Sanjar marched his army to Hamadan. Following the news of Sultan Sanjar's victory, his name was recited in the Friday sermons in Baghdad by Sadaqa ibn Mansour's request. At Hamadan, Sanjar met his nephew Mahmud and pardoned him with the intervention of his mother Safariyya Khatun and the Viziers, and made him his heir and married him to his daughter Mah-i Mulk Khatun. Sultan Sanjar made an agreement with his nephew and gave him the western territories of his country, namely Hamadan, Isfahan, Iraq, Kerman, Khuzistan, Mosul, Al-Jazira, Diyar Mudar, Syria, Anatolia, Azerbaijan, Diyar Bakr, Fars, Harran, Armenia and Georgia. According to the agreement reached between the two sides, it was decided that Sanjar would use the titles “Sultan al-Azam and Sultan al-Salatin” and Mahmud would use the titles “al-Sultan al-Mu'azzam and Sayyidu al-Salatin”. Sanjar also commanded that his nephews name be read after his named in the Khutbah.
