= Majd al-Dawla =

Buyid amir of Ray (997-1029)

Majd al-Dawla مجد الدوله
- Amir; Shahanshah
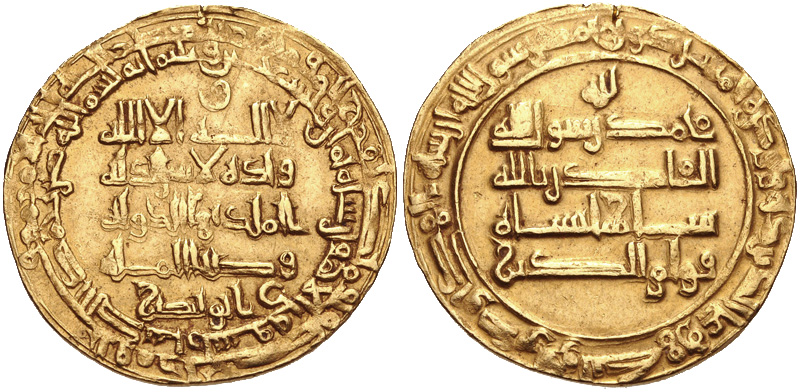
- Coin of Majd al-Dawla

Amir of the Buyid amirate of Ray
- Reign: 997–1029
- Predecessor: Fakhr al-Dawla
- Successor: Mahmud of Ghazni (Ghaznavid dynasty)
- Born: 993
- Died: after 1029; Ghazni
- Issue: Fana-Khusrau; Abu Dulaf
- Dynasty: Buyid dynasty
- Father: Fakhr al-Dawla
- Mother: Sayyida Shirin
- Religion: Shia Islam

Abu Talib Rustam (Persian: ابو طالب رستم; 997–1029), commonly known by his laqab (honorific title) of Majd al-Dawla (مجد الدوله), was the last amir (ruler) of the Buyid amirate of Ray from 997 to 1029. He was the eldest son of Fakhr al-Dawla (r. 976–980, 984–997). A weak ruler, he was a figurehead most of his reign, whilst his mother Sayyida Shirin was the real ruler of the kingdom.

Majd al-Dawla's reign saw the gradual shrinking of Buyid holdings in central Iran; Gurgan and Tabaristan had been lost to the Ziyarids in 997, while several of the western towns were seized by the Sallarids of Azerbaijan. There were also internal troubles, such as the revolt of the Daylamite military officer Ibn Fuladh in 1016. Following the death of Sayyida Shirin in 1028, Majd al-Dawla was faced with a revolt by his Daylamite soldiers, and thus requested the assistance of the Ghaznavid ruler Mahmud (r. 998–1030) in dealing with them. Mahmud came to Ray in 1029, deposed Majd al-Dawla as ruler, and sacked the city, bringing an end to Buyid rule there.

Majd al-Dawla was reportedly sent to the Ghaznavid capital of Ghazni, where he died.

== Background ==
Abu Talib Rustam was a member of the Buyid dynasty, a Daylamite family which ruled mainly over what is now the south and western part of Iran, as well as all of present-day Iraq. The Buyid realm was mostly divided into three independent principalities, centered on Ray (in Jibal), Shiraz (in Fars) and Baghdad (in Iraq). Abu Talib Rustam was born in 993. He was the son of the Buyid amir (ruler) Fakhr al-Dawla (r. 976–980, 984–997), who ruled Jibal, Tabaristan and Gurgan. His mother was Sayyida Shirin, a princess from the Bavand dynasty in Tabaristan. Abu Talib Rustam was to be thoroughly educated to become fit to rule. His tutor was Ibn Faris (died 1004), a prominent Persian scholar and grammarian from Hamadan.

== Reign ==
=== Accession ===
Following Fakhr al-Dawla's death by stomach illness in 997, his realm in Jibal was divided between Abu Talib Rustam, who received the capital of Ray and its surroundings, and the younger son Shams al-Dawla, who received the cities of Hamadan and Qirmisin as far as the borders of Mesopotamia. They were both installed as co-rulers by Sayyida Shirin, who became the regent of the realm due to their young age. Regardless, Shams al-Dawla was Abu Talib Rustam's subordinate. The senior Buyid amir Samsam al-Dawla (r. 983–998), who ruled Fars, had faithfully acknowledged Fakhr al-Dawla as senior amir during the latter's reign. Because of this, Samsam al-Dawla was now entitled to ask for the allegiance of Majd al-Dawla in return.

An arrangement with the Buyid amir of Iraq, Baha al-Dawla (r. 988–1012), and the Abbasid caliph, however, seemed more appealing to the court at Ray. Details regarding the negotiations between the parties are unknown. In 998, on the request of Baha al-Dawla, the caliph al-Qadir (r. 991–1031) gave Abu Talib Rustam the dual title of Majd al-Dawla wa-Falak al-umma. According to the Iranologist Wilferd Madelung; "In return for this service, Baha al-dawla must have gained, besides the recognition of the caliph al-Qadir, an alliance and some kind of recognition of his supremacy, although his name was not mentioned on the coinage of Majd al-dawla until years later."

Samsam al-Dawla soon died afterwards, and by 999 Fars was under the control of Baha al-Dawla, who had now become senior amir.

=== Early reign ===
Following Fakhr al-Dawla's death, the Ziyarid ruler Qabus (r. 977–981, 997–1012) conquered Tabaristan and Gurgan, which he had previously ruled before being defeated by the Buyids. Following Majd al-Dawla's failure to repel Qabus, the latter ruled Tabaristan and Gurgan with little disturbance. Majd al-Dawla also lost several western towns (including Zanjan) to the Sallarids of Azerbaijan. The Hasanwayhid chieftain Badr ibn Hasanwayh (r. 979–1013), who ruled around Qirmisin as a Buyid vassal, went to Ray to help Majd al-Dawla administer the local affairs, but his help was rebuffed. As a result, Badr kept gradually dissociating himself from the affairs at Ray. By at least as early as 1003, Sayyida Shirin had secured the governorship of Isfahan to her first cousin Ala al-Dawla Muhammad, thus marking the start of the Kakuyid dynasty.

In 1005, Majd al-Dawla assumed the imperial Persian title of shahanshah (King of Kings) in order to signal his ascendancy over that of his brothers and vassals. Nevertheless, he did not attempt to challenge the dominant position of Baha al-Dawla. From 1009/10 and onwards, Majd al-Dawla officially recognized Baha al-Dawla as senior amir on his coins. Some of them later on even refers Baha al-Dawla by the title of shahanshah. Baha al-Dawla died in December 1012, and was succeeded by his son Abu Shuja Fanna Khusraw (Sultan al-Dawla), who assumed the title of shahanshah as a claim over his father's dominant position. Majd al-Dawla did not acknowledge Sultan al-Dawla's claim, as he himself had in reality become the senior amir.

=== Internal affairs ===
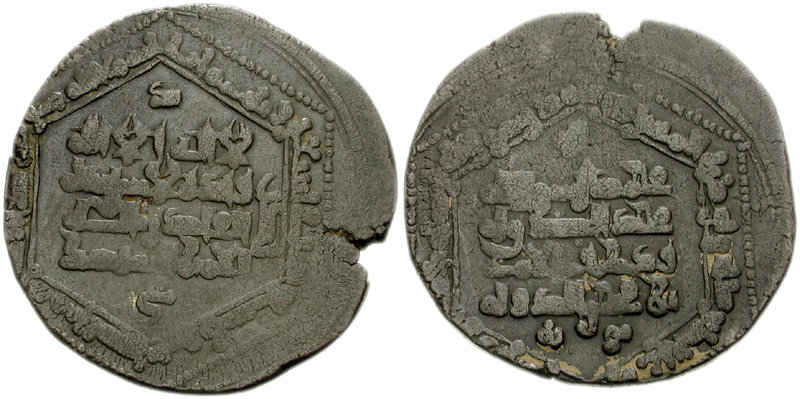
Coin of Shams al-Dawla (r. 997–1021), the younger brother of Majd al-Dawla and ruler of Hamadan and Qirmisin

In 1008, with the assistance of his vizier Abu 'Ali ibn 'Ali, Majd al-Dawla attempted to throw off the regency of his mother. Sayyida Shirin, however, escaped to Badr ibn Hasanwayh, and together with Shams al-Dawla they put Ray under siege. After several battles, the city was taken and Majd al-Dawla was captured. He was imprisoned by his mother in the fort of Tabarak, while Shams al-Dawla took to power in Ray. A year later (in 1009), Sayyida Shirin fell out with Shams al-Dawla, and thus freed and reinstated Majd al-Dawla in Ray, while Shams al-Dawla returned to Hamadan. Power continued to be held by Sayyida Shirin. In 1014, Majd al-Dawla and Sayyida Shirin were forced to flee to Damavand following an attack on Ray by Shams al-Dawla. However, a mutiny amongst the troops of Shams al-Dawla forced the latter to return to Hamadan, while Majd al-Dawla and Sayyida Shirin returned to Ray. In the same year, the distinguished Persian polymath Avicenna (died 1037) went to Ray, where he entered into the service of Majd al-Dawla and Sayyida Shirin. There he served as the physician at the court, treating Majd al-Dawla, who was suffering from melancholia. Avicenna reportedly later served as the "business manager" of Sayyida Shirin in Qazvin and Hamadan, though details regarding this tenure are unclear. Avicenna later joined Shams al-Dawla, possibly due to his opponent Abu'l-Qasim al-Kirmani also working under Sayyida Shirin.

In 1016, Majd al-Dawla and Sayyida Shirin declined the demand of the Daylamite military officer Ibn Fuladh to become the governor of Qazvin. As a result, the latter started attacking the outskirts of Ray. With the help of the Bavandid prince Abu Ja'far Muhammad (died 1028), Majd al-Dawla repelled Ibn Fuladh from Ray, who fled to the Ziyarid ruler Manuchihr (r. 1012–1031). There Ibn Fuladh secured Manuchihr's assistance in exchange for his fealty. Reinforced by 2,000 troops by Manuchihr, Ibn Fuladh laid siege to Ray, thus forcing Majd al-Dawla to appoint him as the governor of Isfahan. Following this event, records of Ibn Fuladh disappear, which suggests he was unable to dislodge the then incumbent governor of Isfahan, Ala al-Dawla Muhammad.

The fragility of Majd al-Dawla's kingdom allowed Ala al-Dawla Muhammad to rule autonomously, as well as expand his realm into the northern and western mountains, then controlled by autonomous Kurdish dynasties such as the Annazids. In 1023, Ala al-Dawla Muhammad captured Hamadan, putting an end to the rule of Shams al-Dawla's son and successor Sama' al-Dawla (r. 1021–1023). Majd al-Dawla was powerless to interfere. Although Ala al-Dawla Muhammad was virtually an independent monarch and the most powerful figure in Jibal, he continued to mint coins inscribed with the name of Majd al-Dawla as his suzerain until the latter's downfall in 1029. A distinguished coin minted by Ala al-Dawla Muhammad in 1019/20 at Isfahan mentions Majd al-Dawla as shahanshah.

=== Downfall ===
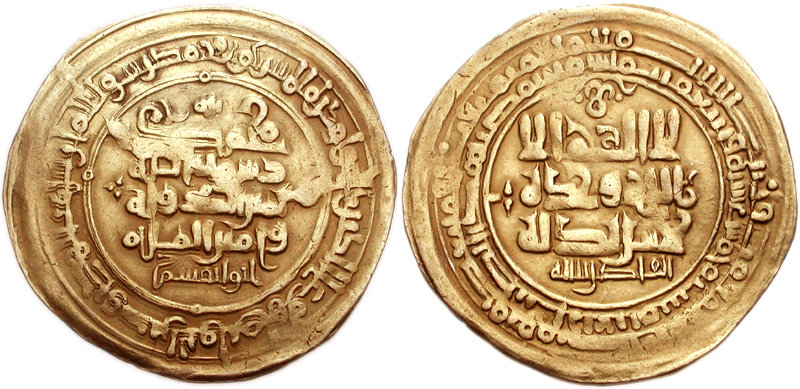
Coin of the Ghaznavid ruler Mahmud (r. 998–1030), who overthrew Majd al-Dawla

When Sayyida Shirin died in 1028, the consequences of the political seclusion of Majd al-Dawla became apparent. He was soon faced with a revolt by his Daylamite soldiers, and requested the assistance of the Ghaznavid ruler Mahmud (r. 998–1030) in dealing with them. Mahmud had been keen to expand his power to the west, but had refrained from attacking Ray due to the resolute presence of Sayyida Shirin. Using Majd al-Dawla's request for help as a pretext, Mahmud conquered Ray in March/April 1029. He deposed Majd al-Dawla as ruler, and sacked the city, bringing an end to Buyid rule there. Much of the great library in Ray was burned, while many inhabitants were assembled and stoned as heretics. Mahmud justified his onslaught as a way of purging "infidel Batiniyya and evil-doing innovators".

The Iranologist Clifford Edmund Bosworth referred to Majd al-Dawla's decision as "foolish." The Arab historian Ibn al-Athir (died 1233) reports that following the conquest of Ray, Mahmud is said to have summoned Majd al-Dawla and asked him; "Have you not read the Shahnama, which is the history of the Persians, and al-Tabari's History, which is the history of the Muslims? When Majd al-Dawla answered yes, Mahmud replied; "Your conduct is not that of one who has." Majd al-Dawla was reportedly sent to the Ghaznavid capital of Ghazni, where he died. One of Majd al-Dawla's sons, Fana-Khusrau, would attempt to restore the power of the Buyids in the following years, but failed. Majd al-Dawla was also survived by another son named Abu Dulaf.

== Culture ==
From the end of the 10th-century to 1029, Ray had flourished as a center of learning, possibly partly due to maintaining its independence from other Buyid principalities, as well as only occasionally being involved in dynastic struggles. Majd al-Dawla himself was highly engaged in learning. The western regions of Iran were notable for being dominated by Arabic literature; however, after around the mid 10th-century, Persian literary movements from the eastern region of Khurasan started to gain popularity in the western regions, including the court of Majd al-Dawla.

== Sources ==
- Askari, Nasrin (2016). The medieval reception of the Shāhnāma as a mirror for princes. Brill. ISBN 978-90-04-30790-2.
- Adamson, Peter (2013). Interpreting Avicenna: Critical Essays Search in this book. Leiden: Brill. ISBN 978-0521190732.
- Bosworth, C. E. (1975). "Iran under the Buyids". In Frye, Richard N. (ed.). The Cambridge History of Iran. Vol. 4. Cambridge: Cambridge University Press. pp. 250–304. ISBN 0-521-20093-8.
- Bosworth, C. E. (1970). "Dailamīs in Central Iran: The Kākūyids of Jibāl and Yazd". Iran. 8: 73–95. doi:10.2307/4299634. JSTOR 4299634. (registration required)
- Bosworth, C. E. (1996). The New Islamic Dynasties: A Chronological and Genealogical Manual. New York City: Columbia University Press. ISBN 0-231-10714-5.
- Bosworth, C. E. (1997). "Ebn Fūlād". In Yarshater, Ehsan (ed.). Encyclopædia Iranica. Vol. VIII/1: Ebn ʿAyyāš–Economy V. London and New York: Routledge & Kegan Paul. pp. 26–27. ISBN 978-1-56859-050-9.
- Bosworth, C. E. (2010). "Kākuyids". In Yarshater, Ehsan (ed.). Encyclopædia Iranica. Vol. XV/4: Kafir Kala–Ḵamsa of Jamāli. London and New York: Routledge & Kegan Paul. pp. 359–362. ISBN 978-1-934283-26-4.
- Gutas, Dimitri (1987). "Avicenna ii. Biography". In Yarshater, Ehsan (ed.). Encyclopædia Iranica. Vol. III/1: Ātaš–Awāʾel al-Maqālāt. London and New York: Routledge & Kegan Paul. pp. 67–70. ISBN 978-0-71009-113-0.
- Herzig, Edmund; Stewart, Sarah (2011). Early Islamic Iran. I. B. Tauris. ISBN 978-1780760612.
- Kennedy, Hugh (2004). The Prophet and the Age of the Caliphates: The Islamic Near East from the 6th to the 11th Century (Second ed.). Harlow: Longman. ISBN 978-0-582-40525-7.
- Lazard, G. (1975). "The Rise of the New Persian Language". In Frye, Richard N. (ed.). The Cambridge History of Iran. Vol. 4. Cambridge: Cambridge University Press. pp. 595–633. ISBN 0-521-20093-8.
- Madelung, Wilferd (1969). "The Assumption of the Title Shāhānshāh by the Būyids and "The Reign of the Daylam (Dawlat Al-Daylam)"". Journal of Near Eastern Studies. 28 (3): 168–183. doi:10.1086/372014. JSTOR 543842. S2CID 222439877. (registration required)
- Nagel, Tilman (1990). "Buyids". In Yarshater, Ehsan (ed.). Encyclopædia Iranica. Vol. IV/6: Burial II–Calendars II. London and New York: Routledge & Kegan Paul. pp. 578–586. ISBN 978-0-71009-129-1.
- Nashat, Guity; Beck, Lois (2003). Women in Iran from the Rise of Islam to 1800. University of Illinois Press. ISBN 978-0-252-07121-8.
- Miles, G. C. (1975). "Numismatics". In Frye, Richard N. (ed.). The Cambridge History of Iran. Vol. 4. Cambridge: Cambridge University Press. pp. 364–378. ISBN 0-521-20093-8.
- Peacock, Andrew (2007). Mediaeval Islamic Historiography and Political Legitimacy: Bal'ami's Tarikhnamah. Routledge. ISBN 978-0415583114.
- Sajjadi, Sadeq; Asatryan, Mushegh; Melvin-Koushki, Matthew. "Būyids". In Madelung, Wilferd; Daftary, Farhad (eds.). Encyclopaedia Islamica Online. Brill Online. ISSN 1875-9831.
- Spuler, Bertold (2014). Iran in the Early Islamic Period: Politics, Culture, Administration and Public Life between the Arab and the Seljuk Conquests, 633-1055. Brill. ISBN 978-90-04-28209-4.
- Tor, D. G. (2017). The ʿAbbasid and Carolingian Empires: Comparative Studies in Civilizational Formation. Brill. ISBN 978-9004349896.

Preceded by Fakhr al-Dawla	Amir of the Buyid amirate of Ray; 997–1029	Succeeded by Mahmud of Ghazni (Ghaznavid dynasty)
