= Abu Abdallah ibn Jarada =

Abū 'Abdallāh Muḥammad ibn Jarada (1004–1084), or simply Abu Abdallah ibn Jarada, was a wealthy merchant and member of the Hanbali community in 11th-century Baghdad. Originally from Ukbara, he was born in 1004 (395 AH) and originally did trading between his hometown and Baghdad, where he later settled. He lived in the Bab al-Maratib quarter on the east side of Baghdad, in a massive residence consisting of 30 buildings and including a garden, a hammam, and two private mosques. His residence hosted various social functions, such as weddings, for members of the Hanbali community.

Ibn Jarada was a son-in-law of another wealthy Hanbali merchant, Abu Mansur ibn Yusuf, who wielded influence with the Abbasid caliph al-Qa'im. After Abu Mansur's death in 1067, Ibn Jarada inherited his position as family patriarch (together with Abu'l-Qasim ibn Ridwan) and adopted his title of "Shaykh al-Ajall", or "the most eminent shaykh".

Although sources have little to say about the exact nature of Ibn Jarada's commercial activities, they do describe his philanthropic activities. He had a mosque built and named after him, the Masjid Ibn Jarada, near the caliphal palace, where he had Abu Ali ibn al-Banna teach. He also built a school for girls and hired Abu Talib al-Ukbari to teach there. He also hired Abu Ali ibn al-Banna as a private tutor for his family.

He died in 1084 (476 AH), at the age of 81 (in lunar years).
