= Khadija Arslan =

Seljuk princess and wife of Caliph Al-Qa'im

Khadija Arslan Khatun خدیجه ارسلان خاتون
- Tenure: 1056 – 2 April 1075
- Died: Yazd, Iran
- Burial: Yazd
- Spouse: Al-Qa'im; Ali ibn Faramurz
Names
- Khadija Arslan Khatun bint Dawud Chaghri Beg
Era name and dates
- Later Abbasid era: 11th century
- Dynasty: Seljuk
- Father: Dawud Chaghri Beg
- Religion: Sunni Islam

Khadija Arslan Khatun (Persian: خدیجه ارسلان خاتون) was a Seljuk princess, sister of sultan Alp Arslan (r.1063–1072) and Aunt of sultan Malik-Shah I (r. 1072–1092). She was a royal consort of Abbasid caliph Al-Qaim (r. 1031–1075), and then a consort of Kakuyid ruler Ali ibn Faramurz (r. 1070–1095).

She was the daughter of Chaghri Beg, co-ruler of Seljuk dynasty, and sister of Alp Arslan.

She married the Abbasid Caliph Al-Qaim in 1056 AD and their marriage contract was read by an officiant named Rais al-Rusa.

Her uncle, Tughril, requested her husband to give his daughter, Sayidah, in marriage to him but her uncle died before her husband could make a decision. According to some scholars, her husband declined the proposal of her uncle upon which her uncle requested her husband to send Khatun back and she was sent back to her father's house. She complained about the complete abandonment of her husband to her uncle upon which he took her on a trip from Baghdad to the uplands (most probably Baneh) to cheer her up.

Upon the death of her husband in 1075, she married Ali ibn Faramurz, ruler of the Kakuyids dynasty. As the queen of the Kakuyids dynasty, she used to conduct two communal meals every day, one for nobility and another for the general public, undertook many charitable and pious works and commissioned the construction of a mosque and minaret at Durda in Yazd.

== See also ==
- Sifri Khatun
