= Sayyida Shirin =

Bavandid princess

- Died: 1028; Ray
- Spouse: Fakhr al-Dawla
- Issue: Majd al-Dawla; Shams al-Dawla
- Dynasty: Bavand dynasty
- Father: Rustam II
- Religion: Shia Islam

Sayyida Shirin (Persian: سیده شیرین; died 1028), also simply known as Sayyida (سیده), was a Bavandid princess, who was the wife of the Buyid amir (ruler) Fakhr al-Dawla (r. 976–980, 984–997).

She was the regent of most of Jibal during the minority of her son, Majd al-Dawla (r. 997–1029), and served as de facto ruler also after her formal regency had ended during the reign of her son. She is notable for securing the governorship of Isfahan to her first cousin Ala al-Dawla Muhammad, thus marking the start of the Kakuyid dynasty.

== Background ==
Sayyida Shirin was the daughter of Rustam II (r. 964–979), the ispahbadh (ruler) of the Bavand dynasty in Tabaristan, a region in northern Iran. The Bavandid family traced its descent back to Bav, who was alleged to be a grandson of the Sasanian prince Kawus, son of the King of Kings (shahanshah) Kavad I (r. 488–496, 498/9–531). Sayyida Shirin was married to the Buyid amir (ruler) Fakhr al-Dawla (r. 976–980, 984–997), who ruled Jibal, Tabaristan and Gurgan. Together they had two sons, Majd al-Dawla and Shams al-Dawla.

== Regency ==
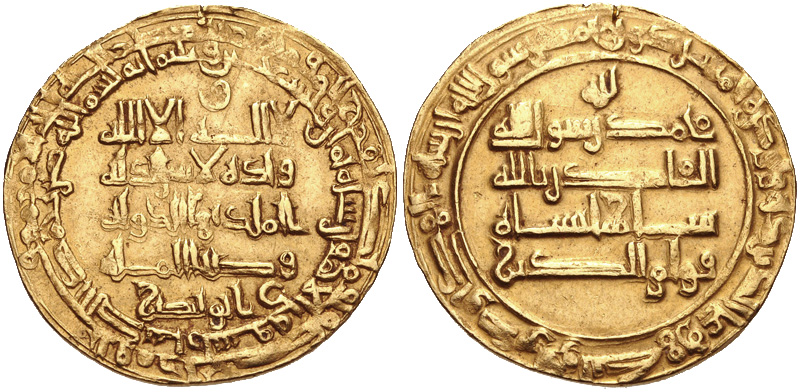
Coin of Majd al-Dawla (r. 997–1029)

Following Fakhr al-Dawla's death by stomach illness in 997, his realm in Jibal was divided between Majd al-Dawla, who received the capital of Ray and its surroundings, and the younger son Shams al-Dawla, who received the cities of Hamadan and Qirmisin as far as the borders of Mesopotamia. They were both installed as co-rulers by Sayyida Shirin, who became the regent of the realm due to their young age. Regardless, Shams al-Dawla was Majd al-Dawla's subordinate. During this period, the Ziyarid ruler Qabus (r. 977–981, 997–1012) conquered Tabaristan and Gurgan, which he had previously ruled before being defeated by the Buyids. Following Majd al-Dawla's failure to repel Qabus, the latter ruled Tabaristan and Gurgan with little disturbance. Majd al-Dawla also lost several western towns (including Zanjan) to the Sallarids of Azerbaijan. The Hasanwayhid chieftain Badr ibn Hasanwayh (r. 979–1013), who ruled around Qirmisin as a Buyid vassal, went to Ray to help Majd al-Dawla administer the local affairs, but his help was rebuffed. As a result, Badr kept gradually dissociating himself from the affairs at Ray. By at least as early as 1003, Sayyida Shirin had secured the governorship of Isfahan to her first cousin Ala al-Dawla Muhammad, thus marking the start of the Kakuyid dynasty.

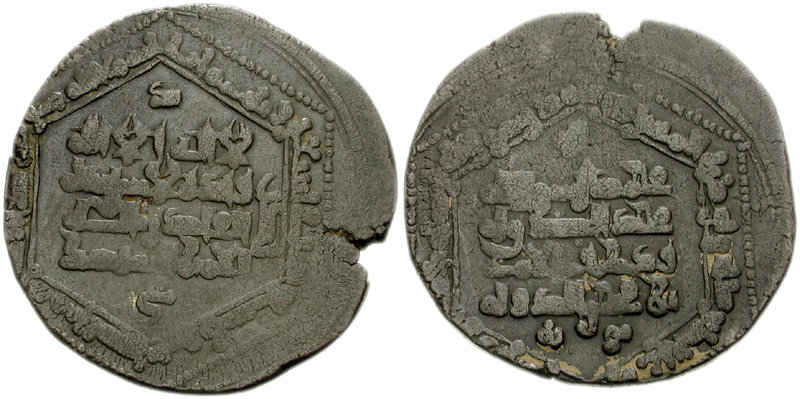
Coin of Shams al-Dawla (r. 997–1021)

In 1008, with the assistance of his vizier Abu 'Ali ibn 'Ali, Majd al-Dawla attempted to throw off the regency of his mother. Sayyida Shirin, however, escaped to the Badr ibn Hasanwayh, and together with Shams al-Dawla they put Ray under siege. After several battles, the city was taken and Majd al-Dawla was captured. He was imprisoned by his mother in the fort of Tabarak, while Shams al-Dawla took to power in Ray. A year later (in 1009), Sayyida Shirin fell out with Shams al-Dawla, and thus freed and reinstated Majd al-Dawla in Ray, while Shams al-Dawla returned to Hamadan. Power continued to be held by Sayyida Shirin.

In 1014, Majd al-Dawla and Sayyida Shirin were forced to flee to Damavand following an attack on Ray by Shams al-Dawla. However, a mutiny amongst the troops of Shams al-Dawla forced the latter to return to Hamadan, while Majd al-Dawla and Sayyida Shirin returned to Ray. In the same year, the distinguished Persian polymath Avicenna (died 1037) went to Ray, where he entered into the service of Majd al-Dawla and Sayyida Shirin. There he served as the physician at the court, treating Majd al-Dawla, who was suffering from melancholia. Avicenna reportedly later served as the "business manager" of Sayyida Shirin in Qazvin and Hamadan, though details regarding this tenure are unclear. Avicenna later joined Shams al-Dawla, possibly due to his opponent Abu'l-Qasim al-Kirmani also working under Sayyida Shirin.

In 1016, Majd al-Dawla and Sayyida Shirin declined the demand of the Daylamite military officer Ibn Fuladh to become the governor of Qazvin. As a result, Ibn Fuladh started attacking the outskirts of Ray. With the help of the Bavandid prince Abu Ja'far Muhammad (died 1028), Majd al-Dawla repelled Ibn Fuladh from Ray, who fled to the Ziyarid ruler Manuchihr (r. 1012–1031). There Ibn Fuladh secured Manuchihr's assistance in exchange for his fealty. Reinforced by 2,000 troops by Manuchihr, Ibn Fuladh laid siege to Ray, thus forcing Majd al-Dawla to appoint him as the governor of Isfahan. Following this event, records of Ibn Fuladh disappear, which suggests he was unable to dislodge the then incumbent governor of Isfahan, Ala al-Dawla Muhammad.

When Sayyida Shirin died in 1028, the consequences of the political seclusion of Majd al-Dawla became apparent. He was soon faced with a revolt by his Daylamite soldiers, and requested the assistance of the Ghaznavid ruler Mahmud (r. 998–1030) in dealing with them. According to the historian Clifford Edmund Bosworth, this was a foolish decision: Mahmud had been keen to expand his power to the west, but had refrained from attacking Ray due to the resolute presence of Sayyida Shirin. Using the Buyids' Shi'a beliefs as a pretext, Mahmud came to Ray in 1029, deposed Majd al-Dawla as ruler, and sacked the city, bringing an end to Buyid rule there.

== Sources ==
- Adamson, Peter (2013). Interpreting Avicenna: Critical Essays. Leiden: Brill. ISBN 978-0521190732.
- Bosworth, C. E. (1970). "Dailamīs in Central Iran: The Kākūyids of Jibāl and Yazd". Iran. 8: 73–95. doi:10.2307/4299634. JSTOR 4299634. (registration required)
- Bosworth, C. Edmund (1975). "The Early Gaznavids". In Frye, Richard N. (ed.). The Cambridge History of Iran: From the Arab Invasion to the Saljuqs. Vol. 4. Cambridge: Cambridge University Press. pp. 162—197. ISBN 0-521-20093-8.
- Bosworth, C. E. (1996). The New Islamic Dynasties: A Chronological and Genealogical Manual. New York City: Columbia University Press. ISBN 0-231-10714-5.
- Bosworth, C. E. (1997). "Ebn Fūlād". In Yarshater, Ehsan (ed.). Encyclopædia Iranica. Vol. VIII/1: Ebn ʿAyyāš–Economy V. London and New York: Routledge & Kegan Paul. pp. 26–27. ISBN 978-1-56859-050-9.
- Bosworth, C. E. (2010). "Kākuyids". In Yarshater, Ehsan (ed.). Encyclopædia Iranica. Vol. XV/4: Kafir Kala–Ḵamsa of Jamāli. London and New York: Routledge & Kegan Paul. pp. 359–362. ISBN 978-1-934283-26-4.
- Busse, Heribert (1975). "Iran under the Buyids". In Frye, Richard N. (ed.). The Cambridge History of Iran: From the Arab Invasion to the Saljuqs. Vol. 4. Cambridge: Cambridge University Press. pp. 250–304. ISBN 0-521-20093-8.
- Gutas, Dimitri (1987). "Avicenna ii. Biography". In Yarshater, Ehsan (ed.). Encyclopædia Iranica. Vol. III/1: Ātaš–Awāʾel al-Maqālāt. London and New York: Routledge & Kegan Paul. pp. 67–70. ISBN 978-0-71009-113-0.
- Kennedy, Hugh (2004) [1986]. The Prophet and the Age of the Caliphates: The Islamic Near East from the 6th to the 11th Century (Second ed.). Harlow: Longman. ISBN 978-0-582-40525-7.
- Madelung, Wilferd (1984). "Āl-e Bāvand". In Yarshater, Ehsan (ed.). Encyclopædia Iranica. Vol. I/7: Ahriman–Alafrank. London and New York: Routledge & Kegan Paul. pp. 747–753. ISBN 978-0-71009-096-6.
- Nagel, Tilman (1990). "Buyids". In Yarshater, Ehsan (ed.). Encyclopædia Iranica. Vol. IV/6: Burial II–Calendars II. London and New York: Routledge & Kegan Paul. pp. 578–586. ISBN 978-0-71009-129-1.
- Meisami, Julie Scott (2003). "Eleventh Century Women Evidence from Bayhaqis History". In Nashat, Guity; Beck, Lois (eds.). Women in Iran from the Rise of Islam to 1800. University of Illinois Press. pp. 80–102. ISBN 978-0-252-07121-8.
- Sajjadi, Sadeq; Asatryan, Mushegh; Melvin-Koushki, Matthew (2021). "Būyids". In Madelung, Wilferd; Daftary, Farhad (eds.). Encyclopaedia Islamica Online. Brill Online. ISSN 1875-9831.
- Spuler, Bertold (2014). Hoyland, Robert G. (ed.). Iran in the Early Islamic Period: Politics, Culture, Administration and Public Life between the Arab and the Seljuk Conquests, 633-1055. Translated by Gwendolin Goldbloom; Berenike Walfurg. Leiden & Boston: Brill. ISBN 978-90-04-28209-4.
