= Sam ibn Wardanruz =

Sam ibn Wardanruz was the first ruler of the Atabegs of Yazd dynasty from 1141 to 1188.

Sam was appointed as atabeg by Ahmad Sanjar in 1141, where he married one of the daughters of the Kakuyid Garshasp II. He is described as a weak ruler, and was in 1188 replaced by his more capable brother Langar ibn Wardanruz. Sam later died in 1193.

== Sources ==
- Bosworth, C. Edmund (2007). Historic Cities of the Islamic World. ISBN 978-9004153882.
- Fairbanks, S. C. (2001). "ATĀBAKĀN-E YAZD". Encyclopaedia Iranica, Online Edition.

Preceded by Garshasp II (Kakuyids)	Atabeg of Yazd; 1141–1188	Succeeded by Langar ibn Wardanruz
