= Garshasp I =

- Emir of Hamadan
- Reign: 1041 – 1047
- Predecessor: Muhammad ibn Rustam Dushmanziyar
- Successor: Seljuq conquest
- Died: 1051/1052; Khuzestan
- House: Kakuyid
- Father: Muhammad ibn Rustam Dushmanziyar
- Religion: Islam

Garshasp I ibn Muhammad (Persian: گرشاسپ بن محمد), mostly known as Garshasp I, was the Kakuyid emir of Hamadan, including Nihawand, Borujerd and western Jibal. He was the youngest son of Muhammad ibn Rustam Dushmanziyar, and was the vassal king of his brother Faramurz. In 1047, the Seljuqs defeated his forces and seized Hamadan, which forced him to flee to Buyid territory, where he became governor of Khuzistan. In ca. 1050, Garshasp sent an army to aid the Ghaznavid ruler Maw'dud in his wars with the Seljuqs. Garshasp later died in 1051/2 in Khuzestan.

== Bibliography ==
- Janine and Dominique Sourdel, Historical Dictionary of Islam, Éd. PUF, ISBN 978-2-13-054536-1, article Kakuyids, pp. 452–453.
- Bosworth, C. Edmund (1998). "KĀKUYIDS". Encyclopaedia Iranica, Vol. XV, Fasc. 4. London et al.: C. Edmund Bosworth. pp. 359–362.
- Bosworth, C. Edmund (1983). "ABŪ KĀLĪJĀR GARŠĀSP (I)". Encyclopaedia Iranica, Vol. I, Fasc. 3. London et al.: C. Edmund Bosworth. p. 328.
- Bosworth, C. E. (1968). "The Political and Dynastic History of the Iranian World (A.D. 1000–1217)". In Frye, R. N. (ed.). The Cambridge History of Iran, Volume 5: The Saljuq and Mongol periods. Cambridge: Cambridge University Press. pp. 1–202. ISBN 0-521-06936-X.

Preceded by Muhammad ibn Rustam Dushmanziyar	Kakuyid Emir of Hamadan; 1041 – 1047	Succeeded by Seljuq conquest
