= Battle of Qatwan =

1141 Qara Khitai victory over the Seljuks

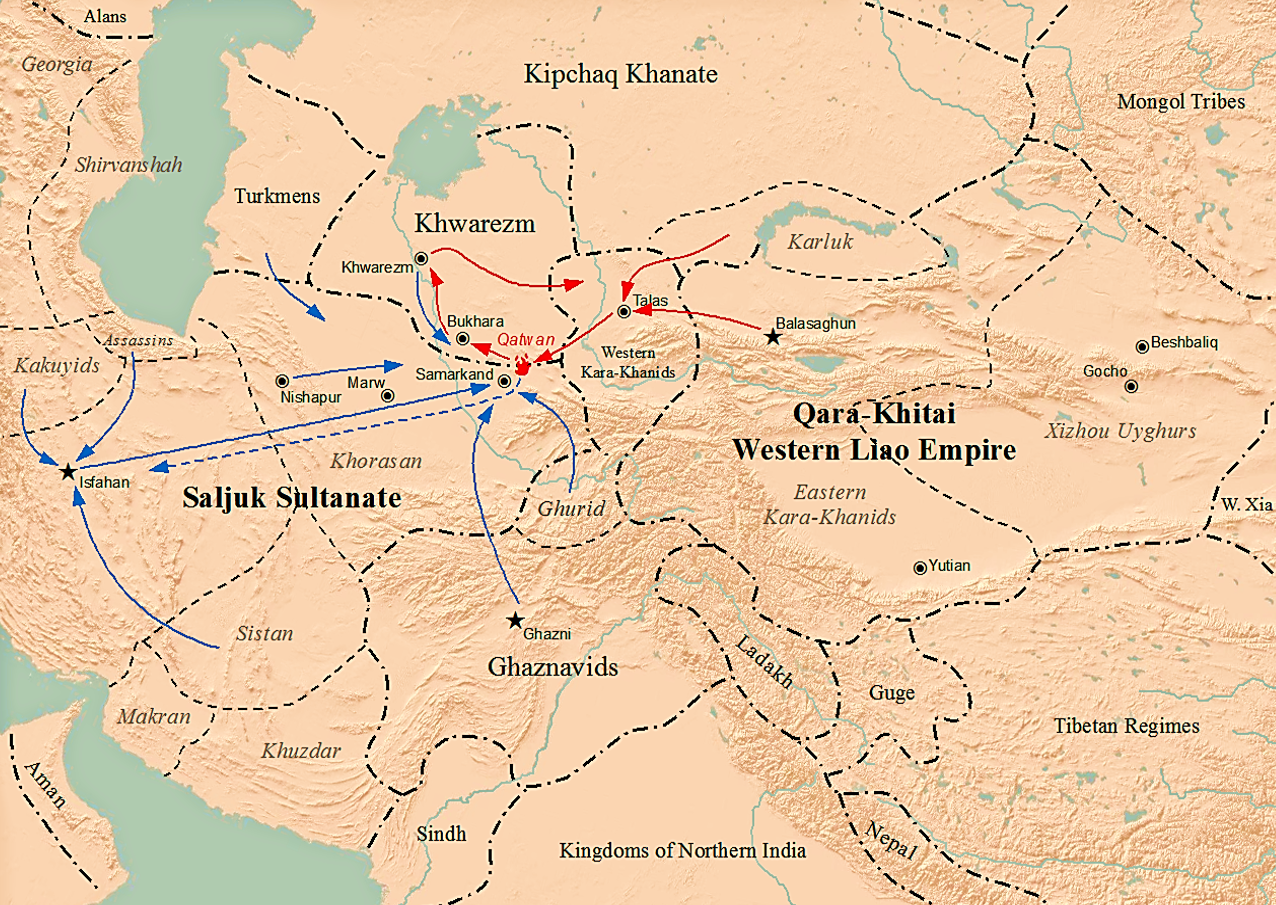
- Configuration of the Battle of Qatwan.
Date	9 September 1141
Location	North of Samarkand 39.8°N 66.9°E
Result	Qara Khitai (Western Liao) victory

Belligerents
Qara Khitai (Western Liao); Karluks	Great Seljuk Empire; Kara-Khanids; Kakuyids

Commanders and leaders
Yelü Dashi	Ahmed Sanjar (AWOL); Garshasp II †; Mahmud II Qarakhan

Strength
20,000–300,000/700,000 (exaggerated Muslim figures) (Note: "..However, since enlarging the rival's troops may be either a convenient excuse for one's defeat or an easy mean to magnify one's victory, these figures should not be taken literally.") (Note: "..he met Yeh-lu Ta-shih, who led an army reported by the Iraqi historian, Ibn al-Athir, as numbering 300,000 horsemen..[..]..Nor did other Moslem historians make any attempt to minimize the scope of the disaster. Some exaggeration is obvious, to be sure, in the attribution to Yehlu Ta-shih of 300,000 men.")	100,000

Casualties and losses
Unknown	50,000
- Location within West and Central Asia

The Battle of Qatwan (Chinese: 卡特萬之戰) was fought in September 1141 between the Qara Khitai (Western Liao dynasty) and the Seljuk Empire and its vassal-state the Kara-Khanid Khanate. The battle ended in a decisive defeat for the Seljuks, signaling the beginning of the end of the Great Seljuk Empire.

== Background ==
The Khitans were people of the Liao dynasty who moved west from Northern China when the Jin dynasty invaded and destroyed the Liao dynasty in 1125. Liao remnants were led by Yelü Dashi who took the Eastern Karakhanid capital of Balasagun. In 1137, they defeated the Western Karakhanids, a vassal of the Seljuks, at Khujand, and the Karakhanid ruler Mahmud II appealed to his Seljuk overlord Ahmed Sanjar for protection.

In 1141, Sanjar with his army arrived in Samarkand. The Kara-Khitans, who were invited by the Khwarazmians (then also a vassal of the Seljuks) to conquer the lands of the Seljuks, and also responding to an appeal to intervene by the Karluks who were involved in a conflict with the Karakhanids and Seljuks, also arrived.

== Battle ==
Widely varying figures from different sources were given for the Kara-Khitan forces, ranging from 20,000 to 300,000, and 700,000, while the Seljuk forces numbered 100,000. The Kara-Khitans were also said to have been given a reinforcement of 30,000–50,000 Karluk horsemen. While many Muslim sources suggested that the Kara-Khitan forces greatly outnumbered the Seljuks, some contemporary Muslim authors also reported that the battle was fought between forces of equal size.

The battle took place on the Qatwan steppe, north of Samarkand, on 9 September 1141. The Kara-Khitans attacked the Seljuk forces simultaneously, encircled them, and forced the Seljuq center into a wadi called Dargham, about 12 km from Samarkand. Encircled from all directions, the Seljuq army was destroyed and Sanjar barely escaped. Figures of the dead ranged from 11,000 to 100,000. Among those captured at the battle were Seljuq military commanders and Sanjar's wife.

== Aftermath ==
Yelü Dashi spent ninety days in Samarkand, accepting the loyalty of Muslim nobles and appointing Mahmud's brother Ibrahim as the new ruler of Samarkand. However, Yelü did allow the Muslim Burhan family to continue to rule Bukhara. After this battle, Khwarazm became a vassal state of the Kara-Khitan. In 1142, Yelü sent Erbuz to Khwarazm to pillage the province, which forced Atsiz to agree to pay 30,000 dinars annual tribute.

== Historical accounts ==
Accounts of the battle are given in a number of sources, for example in Sadr al-Din al-Husayni's Arabic chronicle of the Seljuks. He wrote that "there was no unanimity" among the emirs of Sanjar, therefore, soon after the start of the battle, Sanjar's troops began to retreat leaving him "with a small number of soldiers." Seeing that the enemy gained advantage in the battle and were close to Sultan's location, Abu'l Fadl advised Sanjar to put an ordinary soldier in his own place, and save himself, which Sanjar did. Abu'l Fadl, however, remained with the soldier who played the role of the Sultan until the end of the battle, and was soon captured. Many emirs perished in the battle; some of those who were captured were executed at once. Turkan-Khatun was released for ransom of 500 thousand dinars, Emir Kumach and his son – for 100 thousand dinars, and Abu'l-Fadl was freed without ransom when Yelü Dashi learned that the sons of the ruler of Segestan had seized their father's possessions. The Kara-Khitan ruler said: “Such a hero should not be executed!”. After the defeat, Sanjar intended to go to Balkh, and his path lay close to the enemy's location, “since it was impossible to go by other roads.” However, Yelü Dashi ordered not to intervene; Al-Husayni attributes the following words to the Kara-Khitan ruler: “To close the path for the one who retreats means to force him into a desperate battle. And one who does not value his life and does not think about the consequences, can win".

== Legend ==
Stories of this battle, told during the Second Crusade, filtered back to the Holy Land, inspiring stories of Prester John.

== Sources ==
- Asimov, M. S. (1999). The Historical, Social and Economic setting. Motilal Banarsidass.
- Biran, Michal (2001). "Like a Mighty Wall: The armies of the Qara Khitai" (PDF). Jerusalem Studies in Arabic and Islam. 25: 44–91.
- Biran, Michal (2005). The Empire of the Qara Khitai in Eurasian History: Between China and the Islamic World. Cambridge University Press.
- Bosworth, Clifford (1970). "Dailamīs in Central Iran: The Kākūyids of Jibāl and Yazd". Iran. 8: 73–95. doi:10.2307/4299634. JSTOR 4299634.
- Grousset, René (1970). The Empire of the Steppes: A History of Central Asia. Rutgers University Press. p. 160. ISBN 978-0-8135-1304-1. Archived from the original on 9 September 2023.
- Nowell, Charles E. (1953). "The Historical Prester John". Speculum. 28, No. 3 (Jul).
