= Ali ibn Faramurz =

Persian 11th c. political leader

- Emir of Yazd and Abarkuh
- Reign: Ca. 1070 – 1095
- Predecessor: Faramurz
- Successor: Garshasp II
- Born: Iran
- Died: 1095; Ray
- Consort: Khadija Arslan
- House: Kakuyid
- Father: Faramurz
- Religion: Islam

Ali ibn Faramurz (Persian: علی بن فرامرز), was the Kakuyid Emir of Yazd and Abarkuh. He was the son of Faramurz.

== Biography ==
In 1076/1077, Ali married a daughter of Chaghri Beg named Khadija Arslan Khatun, who was the widow of the Abbasid Caliph Al-Qa'im (1031–1075). Ali was a faithful vassal of the Seljuqs and spent most of his reign at the court of the Seljuq sultan Malik-Shah I in Isfahan. He was a patron of the Persian poet Mu'izzi who wrote some poems dedicated to him.

After the death of Malik-Shah I in 1092, Ali supported his brother Tutush I who dominated the western part of the Seljuq Empire and considered his claim to the throne superior to Barkiyaruq's. Tutush, however, was decisively defeated in a battle near Ray in 1095, where he and Ali were killed. Ali was succeeded by his son Garshasp II.

== Bibliography ==
- Janine and Dominique Sourdel, Historical Dictionary of Islam, Éd. PUF, ISBN 978-2-13-054536-1, article Kakuyids, pp. 452–453.
- Bosworth, C. Edmund (1998). "KĀKUYIDS". Encyclopaedia Iranica, Vol. XV, Fasc. 4. London et al.: C. Edmund Bosworth. pp. 359–362.
- Bosworth, C. E. (1968). "The Political and Dynastic History of the Iranian World (A.D. 1000–1217)". In Frye, R. N. (ed.). The Cambridge History of Iran, Volume 5: The Saljuq and Mongol periods. Cambridge: Cambridge University Press. pp. 1–202. ISBN 0-521-06936-X.
- Bosworth, C. Edmund (1985). "ʿALĪ B. FARĀMARZ". Encyclopaedia Iranica, Vol. I, Fasc. 8. London et al.: C. Edmund Bosworth. pp. 848–849.

Preceded by Faramurz	Kakuyid Emir of Yazd and Abarkuh; Ca. 1070 – 1095	Succeeded by Garshasp II
