= Ibn Fuladh =

Daylamite military personnel

Ibn Fuladh, also known as Ibn Puladh, was a Daylamite military officer who is known for revolting against his Buyid overlords. He was the son of Fuladh ibn Manadhar, a prominent Buyid officer who was son of Manadhar, a Justanid king.

Ibn Fuladh, in order to gain Qazvin as his fief, revolted against the Buyid ruler Majd al-Dawla in 1016. Majd al-Dawla, however, refused to make him governor of Qazvin, which made Ibn Fuladh threaten him around the countryside of his capital in Ray. Majd al-Dawla then requested the aid of his vassal, the Bavandid ruler Abu Ja'far Muhammad, who managed to defeat Ibn Fuladh and repel him from Ray. Ibn Fuladh then requested aid from the Ziyarid ruler Manuchihr, who was a rival of the Buyids. Ibn Fuladh agreed to become Manuchihr's vassal in return for his aid. The following year, a combined army of Ibn Fuladh and Manuchihr besieged Ray, which forced Majd al-Dawla to make Fuladh the governor of Isfahan. However, the Kakuyid ruler Muhammad ibn Rustam Dushmanziyar, who was the original ruler of Isfahan, defeated Ibn Fuladh, and possibly killing him during the battle.

== Sources ==
- Madelung, W. (1975). "The Minor Dynasties of Northern Iran". In Frye, R. N. (ed.). The Cambridge History of Iran, Volume 4: From the Arab Invasion to the Saljuqs. Cambridge: Cambridge University Press. pp. 198–249. ISBN 978-0-521-20093-6.
- Bosworth, C. Edmund (1997). "EBN FŪLĀD". Encyclopaedia Iranica, Vol. VIII, Fasc. 1. London et al.: C. Edmund Bosworth. pp. 26–27.
