= Fana-Khusrau =

Fana-Khusrau was a son of the Buyid amir Majd al-Dawla.

Fana-Khusrau attempted to restore his father's kingdom in central Iran, which had been overrun by the Ghaznavids in 1029. However, despite the defeat of the Ghaznavids by the Seljuks in 1040, Fana-Khusrau was not successful in his attempts. He vainly attempted to preserve central Iran from the Seljuks, who eventually became the supreme sovereigns in that area.

== Sources ==
- Bosworth, C. E. (1975). "Iran under the Buyids". In Frye, R. N. (ed.). The Cambridge History of Iran, Volume 4: From the Arab Invasion to the Saljuqs. Cambridge: Cambridge University Press. pp. 250–305. ISBN 0-521-20093-8.
