= Abu Mansur ibn Yusuf =

11th-century Confidant of Abbasid caliph Al-Qa'im and a merchant

Abu Mansur ibn Yusuf, full name Abū Manṣūr 'Abd al-Malik ibn Muḥammad ibn Yūsuf (1004/5-late 1067), was a wealthy Hanbali merchant in 11th-century Baghdad who was a benefactor and confidant to the Abbasid caliph al-Qa'im. He was also known by the honorific al-Shaykh al-Ajall, or "the most eminent shaykh"; according to Ibn al-Jawzi, he was the only person during his lifetime to have this title. He was a major proponent of traditionalist/Ash'ari Islam against Mu'tazilis and other "innovative" movements.

Abu Mansur took Ibn Aqil in as his ward after the Seljuk sack of Baghdad in 1055, during which Ibn Aqil's parents were likely killed and their home destroyed. This decision may have been recommended by Qadi Abu Ya'la, the head of the Hanbali community in Baghdad. After Abu Ya'la died in August 1066, Abu Mansur secured Ibn Aqil to succeed him the professorial chair at the mosque of al-Mansur. This was a controversial choice because of his youth and suspected rationalist sympathies, as well as because it was passing over the expected successor Sharif Abu Ja'far.

Abu Mansur played a role in the controversial opening of the Nizamiyya of Baghdad in September 1067. Nizam al-Mulk had originally designated Abu Ishaq al-Shirazi to be its head, but Abu Ishaq did not show up for the inauguration in protest of the fact that parts of Baghdad had been torn down (in his view, unjustly) to provide construction materials for the Nizamiyya. When Abu Ishaq did not come, Abu Mansur instead appointed Ibn al-Sabbagh to the chair and assured him that he would not allow Abu Ishaq to replace him. Why Abu Mansur did this is unknown. Nizam al-Mulk was upset and wrote to his agent in Baghdad, and Abu Ishaq ended up accepting and assumed office on 13 October.

Abu Mansur died during Muharram, less than a month later (i.e. November or December, 1067); the cause of his death is unknown. According to George Makdisi, his death may not have been natural because of his conflict with Nizam al-Mulk. Based on entries in Abu Ali ibn al-Banna's diary, his death appears to have been perceived as a great loss for the traditionalist camp. It also left Ibn Aqil without an influential protector and led to him being exiled in February 1069.
