= Mafarrukhi =

Mufaddal ibn Sa'd al-Mafarrukhi, commonly known as Mafarrukhi, was an Iranian historian who was the author of the Arabic Kitab Mahasin Isfahan (Book of the Beauties of Isfahan), a local history of his hometown Isfahan. Modern historians generally agree that Maffarrukhi composed his work during the reign of the Seljuk sultan Malik-Shah I (r. 1072–1092).

Little is known about Mafarrukhi's life. He belonged to one of Isfahan's leading families, and was (or insisted to be) descended from the aristocracy of the pre-Islamic Sasanian Empire (224–651). Mafarrukhi's family probably owned land around Isfahan. Mafarrukhi's paternal grandfather was Abu Muslim Tahir ibn Muhammad, a poet in the entourage of the prominent Buyid king Adud al-Dawla (r. 949–983). Mafarrukhi's maternal grandfather was Abu Hasan al-Anda'ani, who was connected to the governor of Isfahan.

== Sources ==
- Bulliet, R. (1986). "al-Māfarrūk̲h̲ī". In Bosworth, C. E.; van Donzel, E.; Lewis, B. & Pellat, Ch. (eds.). The Encyclopaedia of Islam, Second Edition. Volume V: Khe–Mahi. Leiden: E. J. Brill. p. 1157. ISBN 978-90-04-07819-2.
- Durand-Guédy, David (2005). "Iranians at War under Turkish Domination: The Example of Pre-Mongol Isfahan". Iranian Studies. 38 (4): 587–606. doi:10.1080/00210860500338382. JSTOR 4311765. S2CID 161495735. (registration required)
- Durand-Guédy, David (2008). "The Political Agenda of an Iranian Adīb at the Time of the Great Saljuqs: Māfarrūkhī's K. Maḥāsin Iṣfahān Put Into Context". Nouvelle Revue des Études Iraniennes: 67–105.
- Paul, Jürgen (2000). "The Histories of Isfahan: Mafarrukhi's Kitāb maḥāsin Iṣfahān". Iranian Studies. 33 (1/2): 117–132. doi:10.1080/00210860008701978. JSTOR 4311336. S2CID 161172021. (registration required)
- Peacock, A. C. S. (2015). The Great Seljuk Empire. Edinburgh University Press. pp. 1–378. ISBN 978-0-7486-3826-0.
