= Abu Ali ibn al-Banna =

11th-century author, scholar and diarist from Baghdad

Abū 'Alī al-Ḥasan ibn Aḥmad ibn 'Abd Allāh ibn al-Bannā' al-Baghdādī al-Ḥanbalī
- Born: c. 1005 (396 AH)
- Died: 11 January 1079 (5 Rajab, 471 AH)
- Other name: Abu Ali ibn al-Banna
- Occupations: Author, Scholar, Diarist
- Era: Later Abbasid era

Abu Ali ibn al-Banna, (Arabic: أَبُو عَلِيٍّ الْحَسَنُ بْنُ أَحْمَدَ بْنِ عَبْدِ اللَّهِ بْنِ الْبَنَّاءِ الْبَغْدَادِيُّ الْحَنْبَلِيُّ, romanized: Abū 'Alī al-Ḥasan ibn Aḥmad ibn 'Abd Allāh ibn al-Bannā' al-Baghdādī al-Ḥanbalī), was an 11th-century author, scholar, and diarist from Baghdad. According to Ibn al-Sam'ani, he was one of the leading Islamic scholars of his day and a prolific author. Ibn al-Banna kept a diary during his lifetime, part of which survives today and is valuable as a primary source about life in 11th-century Baghdad. He was a member of the Hanbali legal guild.

== Biography ==
Abu Ali ibn al-Banna was born in 1005 (396 AH); his family background is unknown. He appears to have lived in Baghdad his entire life. He married a daughter of Abu Mansur Ali ibn al-Hasan al-Qirmisini (374-460 AH) and had at least one son with her: Abu Nasr Muhammad ibn al-Hasan ibn al-Banna (434-510 AH), who was the oldest of his sons. He had two other sons: Abu Ghalib Ahmad (445-527 AH) and Abu Abdallah Yahya (453-531 AH); they both went on to become teachers themselves and were among Ibn al-Jawzi's tutors.

Ibn al-Banna studied under some of the most renowned Islamic scholars in Baghdad. Many of his teachers also taught al-Khatib al-Baghdadi. He studied hadith under Abu'l-Hasan al-Hammami (one of the most prominent Qur'an scholars of his day), Hilal al-Haffar, Ibn Rizqawayh, Abu'l-Fath ibn Abu'l-Fawaris, Abu'l-Fadl at-Tamim, Abu Ali ibn Shihab al-'Ukbari, and the brothers Abu'l-Husayn ibn Bishran and Abu'l-Qasim ibn Bishran. His first teacher in fiqh, or jurisprudence, was Abu Tahir ibn al-Ghubari, a close friend of Abu Ishaq al-Shirazi. Ibn al-Banna later became an early student of Qadi Abu Ya'la ibn al-Farra' al-Hanbali, who influenced him in his views on fiqh and theology. Other people who gave him training as a jurist were Qadi Abu Ali ibn Abi Musa al-Hashimi, who was highly regarded by the caliphs al-Qadir and al-Qa'im, Abu'l-Fadl at-Tamimi, and Abu'l-Fadl's younger brother Abu'l-Faraj.

Ibn al-Banna started teaching while his own teacher, Qadi Abu Ya'la, was still alive. He later came to lead two study circles: one in the Jami al-Qasr and the other at the Jami al-Mansur. The wealthy Hanbali merchant Abu Abdallah ibn Jarada also hired him to teach at the Masjid Ibn Jarada in east Baghdad, and he was also employed as a special tutor to members of Ibn Jarada's family.

Among Ibn al-Banna's students were the Qur'anic scholars Abu Abdallah al-Bari, Abu'l-Izz al-Qalanisi, and Abu Bakr al-Mazrafi, and the hadith scholar al-Humaydi. He also taught his three sons.

Others who studied under him include:

- Abu'l-Husayn ibn Abi Ya'la al-Farra
- Abu Bakr ibn Abd al-Baqi
- Ibn al-Husayn
- Abu'l-Qasim ibn as-Samarqandi
- Abu'l-Qasim ibn Abi Ya'la al-Farra (eldest son of Qadi Abu Ya'la)
- Abu's-Su'ud al-Mubarak ibn Talib al-Halawi al-Muqri
- Abu Bakr Ahmad ibn al-Khattab al-Hanbali (a.k.a. Ibn Sufan)
- Abu Sa'id Safi ibn Abdallah al-Jammali (a freedman of Ibn Jarada who later taught hadith to both Ibn al-Jawzi and Ibn al-Sam'ani)
- Ja'far ibn al-Hasan al-Darzijani
- Abu'l-Ma'ali Ahmad ibn Abi Tahir al-Madhari

He died at the age of 75 on 11 January 1079 (5 Rajab 471 AH). Funeral rites were performed at the Jami al-Qasr and the Jami al-Mansur, the two mosques where he had taught, led by Abu Muhammad at-Tamimi. He was buried at the Cemetery of Bab Harb, with a large crowd in attendance. He was succeeded in his study circles at the Jami al-Qasr and the Jami al-Mansur by his eldest son Abu Nasr Muhammad.

== Works ==
Ibn al-Banna was a prolific author. According to the Ibn al-Jawzi's Muntazam and Yaqut al-Hamawi's Dictionary of Learned Men, he wrote some 150 books; according to Ibn Rajab's Dhail he wrote "over 300". Some variants of the Muntazam say he wrote 500 books, but this appears to have been a scribal error; this then got repeated in other later biographies of Ibn al-Banna. He wrote about a wide range of topics, including ethics, theology, hadith studies, fiqh, sermons, history and biography, philology, pedagogy, and dream interpretation. He also wrote some poetry, some verses of which are in Yaqut's Dictionary and in Ibn Rajab's Dhail.

Here is a partial list of his works, taken from the Dhail:

1. Sharḥ al-Khiraqī fī'l-fiqh
2. Al-kāmil fī'l-fiqh
3. Al-kāfī'l-muḥaddad fī sharḥ al-mujarrad
4. Al-khiṣāl wa'l-aqsām
5. Nuzhat aṭ-Ṭālib fī tajrīd al-madhāhib
6. Adab al-'ālim wa'l-muta'allim
7. Sharḥ kitāb al-Kirmānī fī't-ta'bīr
8. Sharḥ qaṣīdat Ibn Abī Dāwūd fī's-sunna
9. Al-manāmāt al-mar'īya li'l-Īmām Aḥmad
10. Akhbār al-auliyā' wa'l-'ubbād bi-Makka
11. Ṣifat al-'ubbād fī't-tahajjud wa'l-aurād
12. Al-mu'āmalāt wa'ṣ-ṣabr 'alā'l-munāzalāt
13. Ar-risāla fī's-sukūt wa-luzūm al-buyūt
14. Salwat al-ḥazīn 'inda shiddat al-anīn
15. Ṭabaqāt al-fuqahā'
16. Aṣḥāb al-a'imma al-khamsa
17. At-tārīkh: the name given to Ibn al-Banna's diary by Ibn Rajab
18. Mashyakhat shuyūkhihī (a copy is at the Zahiriya Library in Damascus)
19. Faḍā'il sha'bān
20. Kitāb al-libās
21. Manāqib al-Īmām Aḥmad
22. Akhbār al-Qāḍī Abū Ya'lā
23. Sharaf aṣḥāb al-ḥadīth
24. Thanā' Aḥmad 'alā'sh-Shāfi'ī wa-thanā' alā'sh-Shāfi'ī 'alā Aḥmad, wa faḍā'il alā'sh-Shāfi'ī
25. Kitāb az-zakāh wa-'iqāb man faraṭa fīhā
26. Al-mafṣūl fī kitāb allāh
27. Sharḥ al-īḍāḥ fī'n-naḥw li'l-Fārisī
28. Mukhtaṣar gharīb al-ḥadīth li-Abī 'Ubaid

=== Diary ===
Ibn al-Banna kept a diary, of which only part survives. The part that survives is part of the original manuscript itself, written in Ibn al-Banna's own messy handwriting. (Note: George Makdisi, who translated the diary into English, described the handwriting this way: "There is a minimum of diacritical marks. The letters themselves are not always clearly traced out; they often appear attached to each other where they should not be, and in many cases, they do not even appear. I spent a great amount of time merely on the deciphering of the text.") The language used is a streamlined version of Arabic suitable for quickly taking notes. The diary is valuable as a primary source about 11th-century Baghdad, particularly for events involving the Hanbali community.

The diary's extant part covers a period of just over one year, from 3 August 1068 to 4 September 1069. When Ibn al-Banna began keeping a diary is not known, but he most likely kept writing in it until his death in 1079. The part that survives today eventually ended up in the possession of Diya ad-Din al-Maqdisi, a hadith scholar who had studied under Ibn al-Jawzi. Al-Maqdisi is known to have travelled to Baghdad shortly before Ibn al-Jawzi's death in 1201, and it may have been during this trip that he obtained the present fragment of Ibn al-Banna's diary. In any case, al-Maqdisi later endowed the diary fragment as waqf property for the library of the Diya'iya madrasa he founded in Damascus – a note written in the margin of the first page identifies it as property of the madrasa.

At least two later writers used the diary as a source: Ibn al-Jawzi and Ibn Rajab. Ibn al-Jawzi appears to have had access to parts of the diary that are now lost, but not the current fragment, so it seems that the diary had become separated into multiple parts by then. On the other hand, Ibn Rajab had access to the currently-known part of the diary, but not any others, so the part that survives today was probably in its present state by his time (i.e. none of it has been lost since then).

Ibn al-Banna's diary was meant for his own personal use and was never meant to be published. As evidence of its private nature, it documents the internal dissension within the Hanbali community that he would not have wanted to reveal to the general public (particularly the controversial case surrounding Ibn Aqil), and it also contains unflattering information about Sharif Abu Ja'far, who Ibn al-Banna held in extremely high regard. Most likely, Ibn al-Banna used the diary as a personal notebook for writing down anything he thought was important or interesting, and then later selectively draw upon those notes for material he did intend to publish. Its private nature makes the diary a more reliable source for the events it covers and also "reveals the temperament of the author, his personality, his prejudices, more vividly and more accurately than the stereotyped accounts given in the biographical devoted to him."
