= Atabegs of Yazd =

Persian dynasty

Coordinates: 31°51′N 54°22′E

Atabegs of Yazd Atābakān-e Yazd اتابکان یزد
- 1141–1319
- Domain of the Atabegs of Yazd ( ) and neighboring polities in the 14th century
- Capital: Yazd (1141–1319)
- Common languages: Persian
- Religion: Islam
- Government: Monarchy
- Atabeg
  - 1141–1188: Sam ibn Wardanruz
  - 1315–1319: Hajji Shah ibn Yusuf Shah
- Historical era: Middle Ages
  - Established: 1141
  - Disestablished: 1319
Preceded by	Succeeded by
Kakuyids	Muzaffarids (Iran)

The Atabegs of Yazd (Persian: اتابکان یزد, Atābakān-e Yazd) were a local dynasty that ruled the city of Yazd from approximately 1141 to 1319. They succeeded the Kakuyids, to whom they were linked by marriage.

== Dynasty ==
The names of the first members of the dynasty indicate that they were seemingly ethnically Persian, but like the Hazaraspids they had accepted the Turkish title of Atabeg. Most of the Atabegs of Yazd were tributaries to the Seljuks and the Mongol Il-Khans until they were finally overthrown by the Muzaffarids.

In 1272, the Italian explorer Marco Polo passed through Yazd on his way to China. He referred to Yazd as a "Noble City" that was safe and busy with trade, and functioned like a "desert port" on the "caravan route". The city was then a major silk-weaving center, and Marco Polo wrote about its fine silk. In the book The Travels of Marco Polo, he wrote:

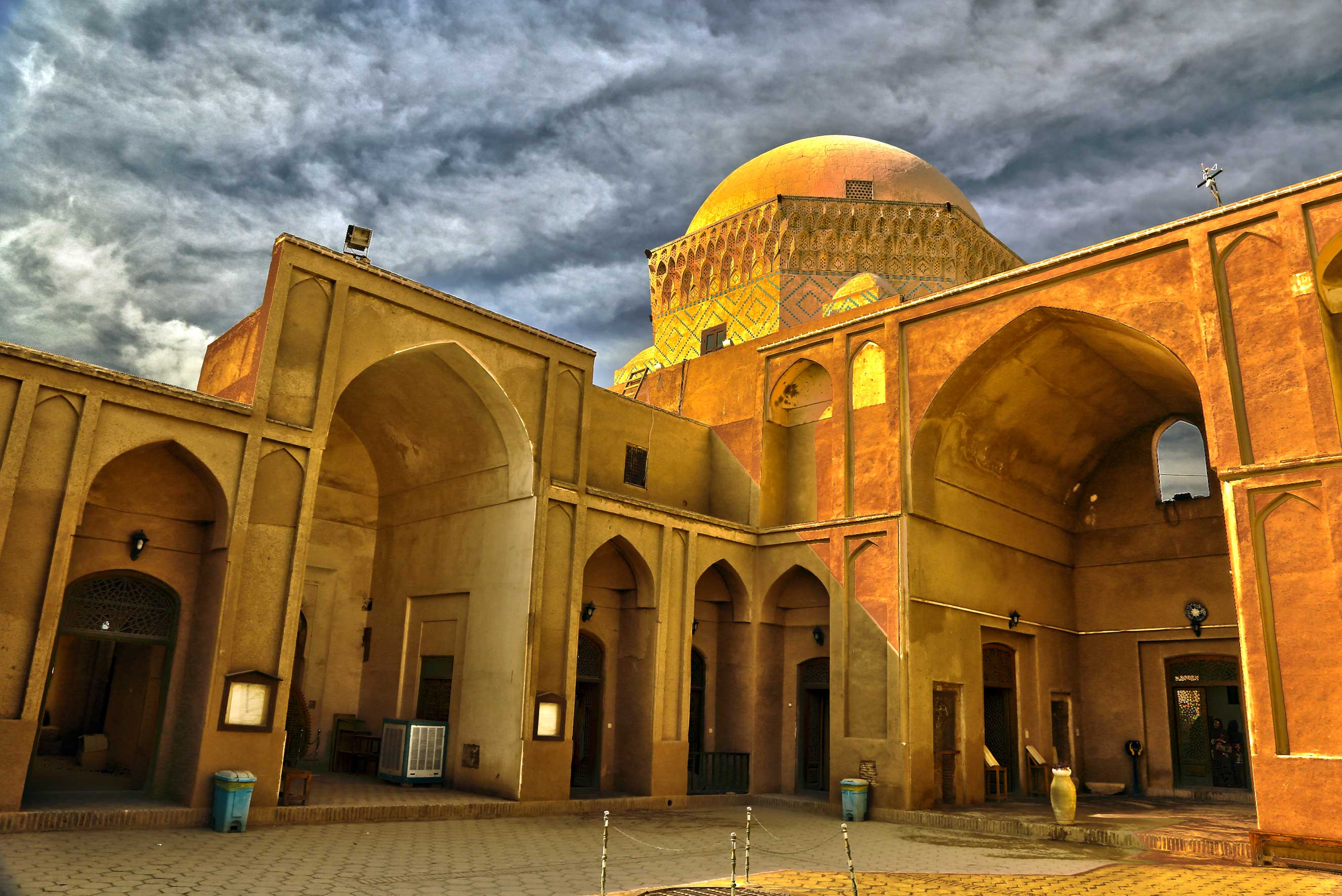
Mausoleum and madrasa in Yazd, known as "Alexander's prison", built in 1234 for the mausoleum and 1306 for the madrasa

Concerning the Great City of Yasdi. It is a good and noble city, and has a great amount of trade. They weave there quantities of a certain silk tissue known as Yasdi, which merchants carry into many quarters to dispose of. When you leave this city to travel further, you ride for seven days over great plains, finding harbour to receive you at three places only. There are many fine woods producing dates upon the way, such as one can easily ride through; and in them there is great sport to be had in hunting and hawking, there being partridges and quails and abundance of other game, so that the merchants who pass that way have plenty of diversion. There are also wild asses, handsome creatures. At the end of those seven marches over the plain, you come to a fine kingdom which is called Kerman.

== Architecture ==
Various buildings are known from the period of the Atabegs of Yazd, such as "Alexander's Prison" (Zindan-i Iskandar), that takes its name from a poem by Hafez in which he speaks of the terrible conditions of detention. On the outside, there is can see a beautiful dome made of raw clay and decorated with plaster works and gold and blue paint. The architectural features of the dome can also be found in other domes dating back to the Ilkhanid period in Iran.

== List of rulers ==
- Sam ibn Wardanruz (1141–1188)
- Langar ibn Wardanruz (1188–1207)
- Wardanruz ibn Langar (1207–1219)
- Isfahsalar ibn Langar (1219–1229)
- Mahmud Shah ibn Isfahsalar (1229–1241)
- Salghur Shah ibn Mahmud Shah (1241–1252)
- Toghan Shah ibn Salghur Shah (1252–1272)
- Ala al-Dawla ibn Toghan Shah (1272–1275)
- Yusuf Shah ibn Toghan Shah (1275–1297)
- Mongol occupation (1297–1315)
- Hajji Shah ibn Yusuf Shah (1315–1319)

== Genealogy of House of Yazd ==
House of Yazd

Atabegs of Yazd

Wardanruz
Sam r. 1141–1188	Langar r. 1188–1207
Wardanruz r. 1207–1219	Isfahsalar r. 1219–1229
Mahmud-Shah r. 1229–1241
Salghur-Shah r. 1241–1252
Tughan-Shah r. 1252–1272
Ala ad-Dawla r. 1272–1275	Yusuf-Shah r. 1275–1297
Hajji-Shah r. 1315–1319

== Sources ==
- C. Edmund, Bosworth (2007). Historic Cities of the Islamic World. ISBN 978-9004153882.
- S. C., Fairbanks (2001). "ATĀBAKĀN-E YAZD". Encyclopaedia Iranica, Online Edition.
