= Al-Qa'im (Abbasid caliph at Baghdad) =

Abbasid Caliph in Baghdad (r. 1031–1075)

Al-Qa'im bi-amri 'llah القائم بأمر الله
- Caliph; Commander of the Faithful
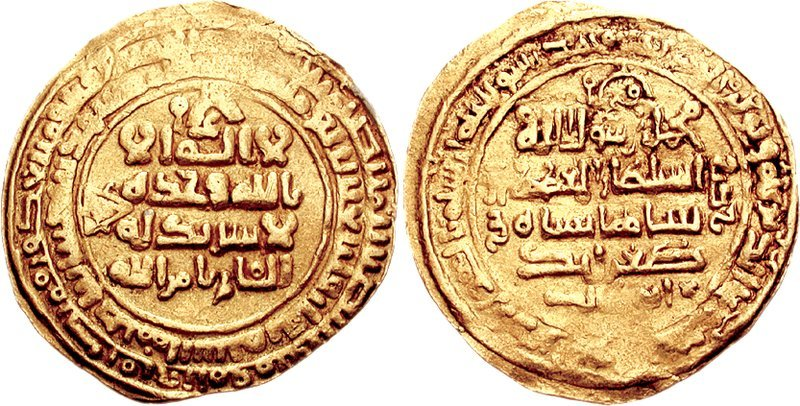
- Gold dinar minted with the names of al-Qa'im and sultan Tughril in Isfahan 448 AH/1056/7 CE

26th Caliph of the Abbasid Caliphate Abbasid Caliph in Baghdad
- Reign: 29 November 1031 – 2 April 1075
- Predecessor: Al-Qadir
- Successor: Al-Muqtadi
- Born: 8 November 1001; Baghdad, Abbasid Caliphate (now Iraq)
- Died: 3 April 1076 (aged 74); Baghdad, Abbasid Caliphate
- Consort: Khadija Arslan; Al-Jiha al- Qa'mya
- Issue: Muhammad; Al-Sayyida
Names
- Abu Ja'far Abdallah ibn Ahmad Al-Qa'im bi-amri 'llah
Era name and dates
- Later Abbasid era: 11th century
- Dynasty: Abbasid
- Father: al-Qadir
- Mother: Qatr al-Nada
- Religion: Sunni Islam

Abū Ja'far Abdallah ibn Aḥmad al-Qādir (Arabic: أبو جعفر عبد الله بن أحمد القادر), better known by his regnal name al-Qā'im bi-amri 'llāh (Arabic: القائم بأمر الله, lit. 'he who carries out the command of God') or simply as al-Qā'im; 8 November 1001 – 3 April 1075), was the Abbasid caliph in Baghdad from 1031 to 1075. He was the son of the previous caliph, al-Qadir. Al-Qa'im's reign coincided with the end of the dominance of Buyid amirs over the Caliphate and the rise of the Seljuk sultans.

== Early life ==
Al-Qa'im was born on 8 November 1001. He was the son of Abbasid caliph al-Qadir (r. 991–1031) and his concubine named Qatr al-Nada (died 1060), an Armenian or Greek, also known as Alam.

His father, Al-Qadir had publicly proclaimed his just nine-year-old son Muhammad (elder brother of Al-Qa'im) as heir apparent, with the title of al-Ghalib Bi'llah, in 1001. However, Muhammad died before his father and never ascended to the throne.

In 1030, al-Qadir named his son Abu Ja'far, the future Al-Qa'im, as his heir, a decision taken completely independently of the Buyid emirs. Al-Qadir died after an illness on 29 November 1031. Initially he was buried in the caliphal palace, but in the next year he was ceremonially moved to al-Rusafa. Al-Qa'im, meanwhile, received "the usual oath of allegiance" on 12 December 1031.

Al-Qaim had other siblings, a brother name Abu'l-Qasim ibn al-Qadir and a sister named Fatima bint al-Qadir who died in 1056, during his reign.

== Reign ==
=== Early reign ===
Map of Middle East (970-1070), Abbasids of Baghdad and its ally nominal vassals during al-Qa'im's early reign, The rival Fatimid Caliphate of Egypt in green.

During the first half of al-Qa'im's long reign, hardly a day passed in the capital without turmoil. Frequently the city was left without a ruler; the Buwayhid Emir was often forced to flee the capital.

At this point, the caliph had "very limited personal resources at his command", but he had recovered a bit of power from earlier periods and was able to arbitrate between the Buyid emirs Jalal al-Dawla and Abu Kalijar. In 1032, al-Qa'im sent the jurist al-Mawardi to meet with Abu Kalijar in secret; he was to refuse to grant him any title but "Malik al-Dawla".

During his reign and of the previous caliphs' period, literature, especially Persian literature, flourished under the patronage of the Buwayhids. The famous philosopher al-Farabi died in 950; al-Mutanabbi, acknowledged in the East as the greatest of Arabic poets, and himself an Arab, in 965; and the Persian Abu Ali Husayn ibn Abdallah ibn Sina (Avicenna) in 1037.

In 1043, Lahore's Ghaznavid governor Faqih Salti marched against Abul Fateh Daud's son. The Ismaili forced withdrew to Mansura. Multan was surrendered to the Ghaznavids and the khutbah was now read for the Abbasid Caliphate than the rival Fatimids.

=== Defeat of Arslan al-Basasiri and Recognition of Tughril as Sultan by al-Qa'im ===
The new Seljuk ruler Tughril overran Syria and Armenia. He then cast an eye upon Baghdad. It was at a moment when the city was in the last agony of violence and fanaticism. Toghrül, under cover of intended pilgrimage to Mecca, entered Iraq with a heavy force, and assuring the Caliph of pacific views and subservience to his authority, begged permission to visit the capital. The Turks and Buwayhids were unfavorable, but Tughril was acknowledged as Sultan by the Caliph in the public prayers. A few days after, Tughril himself — having sworn to be true not only to the Caliph, but also to the Buwayhid amir, al-Malik al-Rahim, made his entry into the capital, where he was well received both by chiefs and people.

The Turkic general Arslan al-Basasiri revolted in 1058 and successfully took Baghdad while Tughril was occupied with his brother's revolt in Iran. Al-Qa'im originally stayed in Baghdad during these events but was later exiled to Anah on al-Basasiri's orders. For about a year, al-Basasiri kept al-Qa'im as his hostage in Anah, as a bargaining chip in negotiations with Tughril. Tughril ended up securing al-Qa'im's freedom by going directly to the amir guarding him, bypassing negotiations with al-Basasiri altogether.

After al-Basasiri died and his revolt came to an end, the Seljuks were left as the single dominant power over al-Qa'im's caliphate. They were similar to the Buyids in this regard, although the Sunni Seljuks were more closely aligned with al-Qa'im in religious matters. Sectarian conflict was a prominent issue during this part of al-Qa'im's reign. A notable incident concerned the opening of the Nizamiyya of Baghdad, a madrasa affiliated with the Shafi'i legal school, in 1067; its opening inflamed tensions with the Hanbalis. Al-Qa'im was reluctant to act without first consulting with the Seljuk sultan and was ultimately unable to control the situation.

While the Seljuk dynasty's influence grew, Chaghri Beg married his daughter, Khadija Arslan, to Al-Qa'im in 1056. Abu Talib Muhammad Tughril recognized only the spiritual authority of the caliph Al-Qa'im while limiting his political influence over the territories Tughril controlled, especially in light of his significant accomplishments: ending the Buyid state’s dominance over Arab Iraq, suppressing local rebellions and bandit groups, and resisting the growing influence of the Shia Fatimids in the region. In accordance with the political doctrine followed by Tughril and his advisers, the caliph’s spiritual status was acknowledged, but his interference in matters of governance was not tolerated; all executive and administrative power was to remain within the sultan’s domain. From this perspective, their policy aimed at diminishing and restricting the temporal authority of the caliph. For example, determining the caliph’s material entitlements and preventing him from exercising control over the Muslim public treasury (bayt al-mal) were among the measures taken in this framework.

To further reinforce the revival of the Abbasid caliphate and secure a future military presence in the region, Tughril requested revenues from certain areas after restoring the caliph to Baghdad. He tasked his adviser, Amid al-Mulk al-Kunduri, with delivering this request. Amid al-Mulk prepared for the mission and set out to appear before the caliph. On the way, he encountered the caliph’s vizier, Abu’l-Qasim ibn Muslimah, who was also carrying a message requesting financial assistance from Tughril. They proceeded together to Tughril’s presence and explained the situation. Realizing that Amid al-Mulk had prior knowledge of the matter, Tughril entrusted him with the management of the issue. Based on the legal codes of Baghdad, Amid al-Mulk established the financial entitlements and limitations of the caliph. As a result, the caliph became increasingly dependent on Tughril’s will and was compelled to comply with his demands following this incident.

=== Reign and relations with Tughril ===
The significance of relations with the Abbasid caliphate was evident to the Seljuks even before their full integration into the Islamic world. Their early actions demonstrate the value they placed on this relationship. For instance, in a letter addressed to the governor of Syria, the Seljuk commanders referred to themselves as “slaves of the Commander of the Faithful.” After the conquest of Nishapur, when the caliph requested that the city not be plundered, Tughril paid forty thousand dinars to his brother Chaghri Beg to prevent the looting and thus secured the caliph’s satisfaction. Following their victory at the Battle of Dandanaqan, the Seljuks sent a letter to the caliph explaining their situation and seeking formal recognition of their authority—clearly indicating their desire for legitimacy from the caliph. In 1055, with Tughril’s entry into Baghdad and the end of Buyid rule, the Seljuks emerged as the principal political force at the center of the Abbasid caliphate. However, unlike their Shi‘i Buyid predecessors, they did not overtly alter the framework of relations with the caliphate. Though some differences can be observed under the reign of later rulers, the need for the caliph’s spiritual legitimacy remained. As with earlier regimes, the Seljuks ensured the legality of their rule through the caliph’s formal approval and the delivery of the Friday sermon (khutba) in their names. Due to his spiritual prestige and influence over the Sunni population, the caliph was regarded as the final arbiter of legitimacy—a status that even the Shi‘i Buyids had to acknowledge. The Seljuks adhered to this principle as well. For example, the way Tughril approached the caliph and conducted their relations closely resembled the behavior of the Buyid ruler Adud al-Dawla. Tughril’s marriage alliance with the caliph—by giving his niece in marriage—was also a symbolic union between religious and political authority. However, a significant departure in Tughril’s conduct was his proposal to marry the caliph’s own daughter. Initially, the caliph opposed this union, but under the pressure of Tughril’s military and political power, the marriage ultimately took place.

=== Reign and Marriage of his daughter with Tughril ===
Tughril’s wife died in the city of Zanjan and was buried in Rayy. Following this event, Tughril instructed Abu Sa‘id, who had been sent to Rayy, to convey to the caliph his desire to marry either his daughter or his sister. Although sources differ on the precise details of this episode, there is general agreement that the caliph initially opposed this request.

This opposition stemmed from the unprecedented nature of a caliphal daughter being married to a sultan—a situation without prior example. Upon hearing of the proposal, the caliph became angered and, through his envoy Abu Muhammad al-Tamimi, offered Tughril two options: either abandon the marriage proposal, send the caliph 300,000 dinars, and surrender the revenues of Wasit and its surrounding areas; or forget the idea of marriage altogether. At first, Tughril decided to reject the offer. However, as al-Kunduri informed him, such a refusal might be interpreted as a sign of weakness. Consequently, Tughril opted to formally accept the caliph’s proposal.

To this end, al-Kunduri, accompanied by Arslan Khatun—the wife of the caliph—went to the caliphal court, carrying numerous gifts and ornaments. After presenting Tughril’s gifts, Arslan Khatun informed the caliph that Tughril had accepted some of his conditions, while rejecting others. The caliph, displeased by this selective acceptance, chose not to respond and expressed his dissatisfaction. He even threatened to leave Baghdad if Tughril did not abandon the marriage proposal. At this point, the caliph ordered that his camp be relocated to the Nahrawan region. Nevertheless, senior figures at court warned the caliph of the potential consequences of such an action. The vizier Ibn Daris hosted a banquet for al-Kunduri in an attempt to defuse the tension.

The caliph’s displeasure arose mainly from Arslan Khatun's report that Tughril had not fully accepted the caliph’s conditions. After al-Kunduri failed to appease the caliph, Tughril departed for Hamadan. Upon learning of the situation, he wrote to the elders of the caliphate, complaining about the caliph’s lack of gratitude for his services. He also requested the return of his niece Arslan Khatun, who had been married to the caliph. Following this, al-Kunduri halted the payment of salaries to the caliph’s household. As a result, the caliph was forced to concede and approved Tughril’s marriage proposal under pressure. He sent a letter granting permission for the marriage.

As a result of these developments, the marriage contract between Tughril and the caliph’s daughter was concluded in 1062 on the outskirts of Tabriz. Tughril sent numerous gifts to the caliph, his daughter, and other members of the caliphal family. Most sources report that the dowry (mahr) of the caliph’s daughter (or possibly his sister) mirrored that of Prophet Muhammad’s daughter Fatima, consisting of 400 silver dirhams and one gold dinar. In 1061, after Tughril departed for the South Caucasus, Kunduri proposed to the caliph that the marriage ceremony be performed. The caliph, however, referred to the written commitments previously made by Kunduri, asserting that the marriage was intended solely to increase Tughril’s political prestige and that no conjugal cohabitation was envisaged. If Tughril wished to see his wife, the caliph stated he could receive her within the palace. In 1062, Tughril went to the caliphal palace in Baghdad to visit the caliph’s daughter, bringing many gifts. However, the bride did not greet him, nor did she unveil herself in his presence. Despite this, Tughril continued to visit her several times and treated her kindly, but his efforts bore no fruit. Ultimately, in 1061, Tughril decided to return to Rayy. He severed ties with the caliph and suspended his stipend. In response, the caliph sent his daughter, along with the Chief Judge (Qadi al-Qudat) of Baghdad, to Tabriz. Tughril welcomed his bride in Tabriz, decorated the city, and presented lavish gifts. The marriage ceremony was conducted by the Chief Judge.

=== Reign and relations with Alp Arslan ===
After accession of Alp Arslan, al-Qaim's power increased. In 1070, the autonomous emirs of Mecca and Medina came under the influence of the Seljuk–Abbasids. After Mecca and Medina came under Seljuk influence, the Fatimid vizier Nasr-Dawla asked for help from Alp Arslan against the Fatimids. Alp Arslan moved with his army upon the call for help and entered Anatolia via Azerbaijan. Alp Arslan first captured the castles of Manzikert and Erciş. Later, he went down to the Silvan and Diyarbekir (Amid) regions and made the emirs there his vassals of Seljuk Empire, then he went to Edessa and besieged the city. When the siege was prolonged, he lifted the siege by receiving a tribute of 50,000 dinars. After leaving Edessa, Alp Arslan crossed the Euphrates. Paul M. Cobb relates that a messenger from Cairo who accompanied the sultan remarked on the significance of the crossing, telling him: "This river has never before been crossed by a Turk except those who were slaves. But you today have crossed it as a king." Afterwards he advanced to Aleppo, which was in the hands of the Mirdasids, and captured the Byzantine castles on his way. When he arrived in Aleppo, he laid siege to the city due to the disobedience of Rashid al-Dawla Mahmud, the Mirdasid emir of Aleppo. Some time after the siege, Rashid al-Dawla Mahmud came to Alp Arslan, apologized, and became his vassal. Later, as Egypt was preparing to advance, the Doukas–Byzantine envoy arrived and Alp Arslan turned his attention to Manzikert. Alp Arslan deeply respected the caliph and took part in battle nominally under caliph's name. The Battle of Manzikert was fought between the Doukas–Byzantine empire and the Seljuks on 26 August 1071

=== Reign and al-Qa'im's recognition of Malik Shah as sultan ===
In 1072, in the final years of al-Qa'im, When Malik-Shah ascended as ruler in Isfahan, his uncle Qavurt claimed the throne for himself and sent Malik-Shah a message which said: "I am the eldest brother, and you are a youthful son; I have the greater right to my brother Alp-Arslan's inheritance." Malik-Shah then replied by sending the following message: "A brother does not inherit when there is a son." This message enraged Qavurt, who thereafter occupied Isfahan. In 1073, the Battle of Kerj Abu Dulaf took place near Hamadan, lasting three days. Qavurt was accompanied by his seven sons, and his army consisted of Turkmens, while the army of Malik-Shah consisted of ghulams ("military slaves") and contingents of Kurdish and Arab troops.

During the battle, the Turks of Malik-Shah's army mutinied against him, but he nevertheless managed to defeat and capture Qavurt. Qavurt then begged for mercy and in return promised to retire to Oman. However, Nizam al-Mulk declined the offer, claiming that sparing him was an indication of weakness. After some time, Qavurt was strangled to death with a bowstring, while two of his sons were blinded. After having dealt with that problem, Malik-Shah appointed Qutlugh-Tegin as the governor of Fars and Sav-Tegin as the governor of Kerman. The caliph recognised Malik Shah as sultan and invested with the "Sultan of East and West".

=== Administration and bureaucracy ===
In 1058 in Bahrain, a dispute over the reading of the khutba in Al-Qa'im's name between members of the Abd al-Qays tribe and the millenarian Ismaili Qarmatian state prompted a revolt led by Abu al-Bahlul al-Awwam that threw off Qarmatian rule and led to the unravelling of the Qarmatian state which finally collapsed in al-Hasa in 1067.

Abu Mansur ibn Yusuf was a wealthy Hanbali merchant in Baghdad and He was a benefactor and confidant to the caliph al-Qa'im. Fakhr ad-Dawla Muhammad ibn Muhammad ibn Jahir was appointed as vizier by al-Qa'im in 1062. Fakhr ad-Dawla arrived and was "showered with gifts, robes of honor, and the title Fakhr ad-Dawla ('glory of the dynasty')." According to Sibt ibn al-Jawzi, he was also given the additional title Sharaf al-wuzarā'.

Fakhr ad-Dawla's first tenure lasted until 1068, when he was dismissed for a series of "infractions" (dhunūb) he had committed. The reasons included "his presence in the Bāb al-Hujra (Privy Chamber) without permission, and his wearing of 'Adud ad-Dawla's ceremonial robes." In other words, he had been acting above his station. According to the diary of Abu Ali ibn al-Banna, the dismissal was on Tuesday, 9 September 1068. Fakhr ad-Dawla was "despondent and apologetic" and "acquiesced in tears". He was escorted out of Baghdad on Thursday night (11 September) and ended up traveling to the court of the Banu Mazyad ruler Nur ad-Dawla Dubays. (Note: Sibt ibn al-Jawzi and Abu Ali ibn al-Banna say this was at al-Hillah, while Ibn al-Athir and al-Bundari say it was at Fallujah instead.) His belongings were later sent to him.

The competition to replace Fakhr ad-Dawla as vizier was fierce. Three different candidates were seriously considered, but none of them successfully took office as vizier. The caliph's initial choice was Abu Ya'la, father of Abu Shuja al-Rudhrawari, but he died on 11 September - before Fakhr ad-Dawla had even left Baghdad. Another early front-runner was the za'im Ibn Abd ar-Rahim, who was sent a letter to inform him of his selection to the vizierate before someone brought his sordid past to the caliph's attention: he had been part of al-Basasiri's entourage during his rebellion in 1058, and he had taken part in looting the caliph's palace and "attacking" the women of the harem. (Note: The sources don't specify if this was sexual violence or just plain violence.) His name was immediately removed from contention. At this point, around mid-late November, Ibn al-Banna wrote that a rumor had started to go around that al-Qa'im would reinstate Fakhr ad-Dawla as vizier. At some point, another candidate, a Hanbali named Abu'l-'Ala', was considered, but he never took office.

Meanwhile, Nur ad-Dawla Dubays had been making "entreaties to the caliph" on Fakhr ad-Dawla's behalf. Eventually, Fakhr ad-Dawla was brought back to serve as vizier. A group of administrative officials went out to meet with him on Sunday, 7 December, in advance of his return to Baghdad. Ibn al-Banna's diary gives the date of his reentry to Baghdad as Wednesday, 10 December 1068. Crowds came to watch and he was "met by the troops, the courtiers, and the leading figures". Vizieral robes of honor were made ready for him on 29 December, and they were bestowed upon him on Wednesday, 31 December. People went to congratulate him the next day. Then on Friday, 2 January 1069, he went on horseback to the Jami al-Mansur in the robes of honor; again, crowds gathered to see him, and in some places they "sprinkled" coins on him.

Al-Qa'im does not seem to have held a grudge against Fakhr ad-Dawla and entrusted him and his son Amid ad-Dawla with a wide range of duties. Sometime around 1071, there was a "diplomatic fracas" between Fakhr ad-Dawla and the Seljuk administration involving a delay in exchanging robes of honor. When Alp Arslan died in 1072, the Banu Jahir were tasked with overseeing the official mourning as well as the ceremonial exchange of loyalty and robes of honor between al-Qa'im and the new Seljuk sultan Malik-Shah I. On 26 September 1073, Fakhr ad-Dawla oversaw the signing of the controversial Hanbali scholar Ibn Aqil's public recantation of his beliefs at the caliphal chancery. This document of retraction is the only one of its kind to survive in full from the middle ages to the present day; the episode marked the ascendancy of traditionalism in Baghdad in the 11th century.

== Family ==
One of Al-Qa'im's wives was the sister of Abu Nasr bin Buwayh also known as Malik Rahim. She died in 1049–50. Another wife was Chaghri Beg's daughter Khadija Arslan Khatun. She had been betrothed to his only son Dhakhirat al-Mulk Abu'al-Abbas Muhammad. However, Muhammad died, and Khadija Arslan married Al-Qa'im in 1056. After Al-Qa'im's death in 1075, she married Ali ibn Faramurz. One of Al-Qa'im's concubines was Al-Jiha al- Qa'mya, an Armenian.

His son Muhammad had a son, Al-Muqtadi, who succeeded his grandfather, born to an Armenian concubine named Urjuwan also known as Qurrut al-Ayn.

Al-Qa'im had a daughter named al-Sayyida. In 1061, Seljuk Sultan Tughril I sent the qadi of Ray to Baghdad, to ask her hand in marriage to him. The marriage contract was concluded in August–September 1062 outside Tabriz, with a marriage proportion of one hundred thousand dinars. She was brought to the Sultan's palace in March–April 1063. After Tughril's death, his successor Sultan Alp Arslan sent her back to Baghdad in 1064. In 1094, Caliph Al-Mustazhir compelled her to remain in her house lest she should intrigue for his overthrow. She died on 20 October 1102.

== Death ==
When al-Qa'im was on his deathbed in 1075, Fakhr ad-Dawla took charge of his personal care - al-Qa'im did not want bloodletting but Fakhr ad-Dawla had it done anyway. Before he died, al-Qa'im advised his grandson and successor al-Muqtadi to keep the Banu Jahir in their position: "I have not seen better persons for the dawla than Ibn Jahir and his son; do not turn away from them."

Al-Qa'im died on 3 April 1074 at the age of 73. He was succeeded by his grandson Al-Muqtadi as the twenty-seventh Abbasid Caliph.

== See also ==
- Qavurt, brother-in-law of caliph Al-Qa'im
- Fakhr ad-Dawla ibn Jahir, vizier under al-Qa'im
- Abu Mansur ibn Yusuf, prominent Baghdad merchant and confidential adviser of al-Qa'im

== Sources ==
- Bosworth, C. E. (1968). "The Political and Dynastic History of the Iranian World (A.D. 1000–1217)". In Boyle, John Andrew (ed.). The Cambridge History of Iran: The Saljuq and Mongol Periods. Vol. 5. Cambridge: Cambridge University Press. pp. 1–202. ISBN 0-521-06936-X.
- Bosworth, C. E (1995). The Later Ghaznavids: Splendour and Decay: The Dynasty in Afghanistan and Northern India 1040–1186. Munshiram Manoharlal Publishers Private, Limited. ISBN 9788121505772.
- Busse, Heribert (2004) [1969]. Chalif und Grosskönig - Die Buyiden im Irak (945-1055) [Caliph and Great King - The Buyids in Iraq (945-1055)] (in German). Würzburg: Ergon Verlag. ISBN 3-89913-005-7.
- Küçükaşcı, Mustafa Sabri (2001). "Kādi̇r-Bi̇llâh". TDV Encyclopedia of Islam, Vol. 24 (Kāânî-i Şîrâzî – Kastamonu) (in Turkish). Istanbul: Presidency of Religious Affairs, Centre for Islamic Studies. pp. 127–128. ISBN 978-975-389-451-7.
- Sourdel, D. (1978b). "al-Ḳādir Bi'llāh". In van Donzel, E.; Lewis, B.; Pellat, Ch. & Bosworth, C. E. (eds.). The Encyclopaedia of Islam, Second Edition. Volume IV: Iran–Kha. Leiden: E. J. Brill. pp. 378–379. ISBN 978-90-04-05745-6. OCLC 758278456.
- Lambton, A.K.S. (1988). Continuity and Change in Medieval Persia. Bibliotheca Persica. Bibliotheca Persica. ISBN 978-0-88706-133-2.
- This text is adapted from William Muir's public domain, The Caliphate: Its Rise, Decline, and Fall.
- Bosworth, Clifford Edmund (1380), Saljūqiyān. Tarjumah-yi Yaʿqūb Āzhand., Tihrān: Intishārāt-i Mūlī
- Durand-Guédy, David (2012). "MALEKŠĀH". Encyclopaedia Iranica.
- Bosworth, Clifford Edmund (1381), Tārīkh-i Īrān-i Kambrīj. Jild-i 5. Tarjumah-yi Ḥasan Anūshah, Tihrān: Intishārāt-i Amīr Kabīr
- Bosworth, Clifford Edmund (2000), Ṭoghri̊l (I) Beg, Encyclopaedia of Islam
- Iqbāl, ʿAbbās (1392), Tārīkh-i Īrān az Inqiżā-yi Sāsānīyān tā Inqiżā-yi Qājārīyah, Tihrān: Intishārāt-i Dabīr
- Spuler, Bosworth, Clifford Edmund, Faruk Sumer, Vladimir Minorsky, Bertold Spuler (1385), Turkān dar Īrān. Tarjumah-yi Yaʿqūb Āzhand, Tehran: Intishārāt-i Mūlī
- Rezaiyan, Ali (1391), Barrasi va moghayese-ye ravand-e mashruiyat-yabi-ye siyasi-ye salatin
- Norwich, John Julius (1991). Byzantium: The Apogee. London: Viking. ISBN 0-670-80252-2.
- Friendly, Alfred (1981). The Dreadful Day: The Battle of Manzikert, 1071. London: Hutchinson. ISBN 978-0091435707.
- The Editors of Encyclopedia Britannica (1998), Toghrïl Beg, Encyclopedia Britannica
- Sattārzādah, Malīḥah (1386), Saljūqiyān, Tihrān: Sāzmān-i Muṭāliʿah wa Tadwīn-i Kutub-i ʿUlūm-i Insānī
- Forūzānī, Abū al-Qāsim (1394), Saljūqiyān az Āghāz tā Farjām, Tihrān: Sāzmān-i Muṭāliʿah wa Tadwīn-i Kutub-i ʿUlūm-i Insānī

Al-Qa'im (Abbasid caliph at Baghdad) Abbasid dynasty Born: 1001 Died: 2 April 1075
Sunni Islam titles
Preceded by Al-Qadir	Caliph of the Abbasid Caliphate; 29 November 1031 – 2 April 1075	Succeeded by Al-Muqtadi
