= Kakuyids =

Daylamite Shia dynasty in Iran (1008–1141)

Kakuyid Emirate آل کاکویه
- 1008–1141
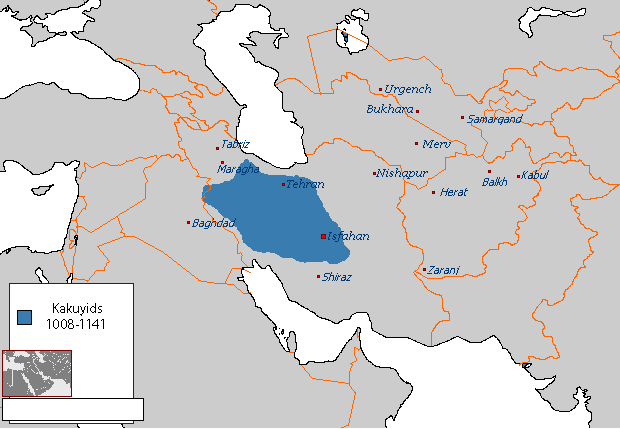
- The Kakuyids at their greatest extent
- Capital: Isfahan (1008–1051); Yazd (1051–1141)
- Common languages: Persian
- Religion: Shia Islam
- Government: Monarchy
- Emir
  - 1008–1041: Muhammad ibn Rustam Dushmanziyar
  - 1095–1141: Garshasp II
- Historical era: Middle Ages
  - Established: 1008
  - Disestablished: 1141
| Preceded by | Succeeded by |
| Buyid dynasty | Great Seljuq Empire; Atabegs of Yazd |

The Kakuyids (also called Kakwayhids, Kakuwayhids or Kakuyah) (Persian: آل کاکویه) were a Shia Muslim dynasty of Daylamite origin that held power in western Persia, Jibal and Kurdistan (c. 1008–c. 1051). They later became atabegs (governors) of Yazd, Isfahan and Abarkuh from c. 1051 to 1141. They were related to the Buyids.

== Origins ==
Scholars state that the Kakuyids were Daylamites, and relatives of Sayyida Shirin, who was from the Daylamite Bavand dynasty.

== History ==
The founder of the Kakuyid dynasty was Ala al-Dawla Muhammad, a Daylamite military leader under the service of the Buyid amirate of Jibal. His father, Rustam Dushmanziyar, had also served the Buyids, and was given lands in the Alborz to protect them against the local rulers of the neighbouring region of Tabaristan. Rustam was the uncle of Sayyida Shirin, a princess from the Bavand dynasty who was married to the Buyid amir (ruler) Fakhr al-Dawla (r. 976–980, 984–997). Because of this connection, Ala al-Dawla Muhammad is often referred to as Ibn Kakuya or Pisar-i Kaku, "meaning son of the uncle." By 1008, he was the governor of the city of Isfahan, a position which Sayyida Shirin had secured him. However, the report of the 11th-century local historian of Isfahan, Mafarrukhi, suggests that Ala al-Dawla Muhammad was in control of the city at least as early as 1003. Over time, he effectively became independent of Buyid control.

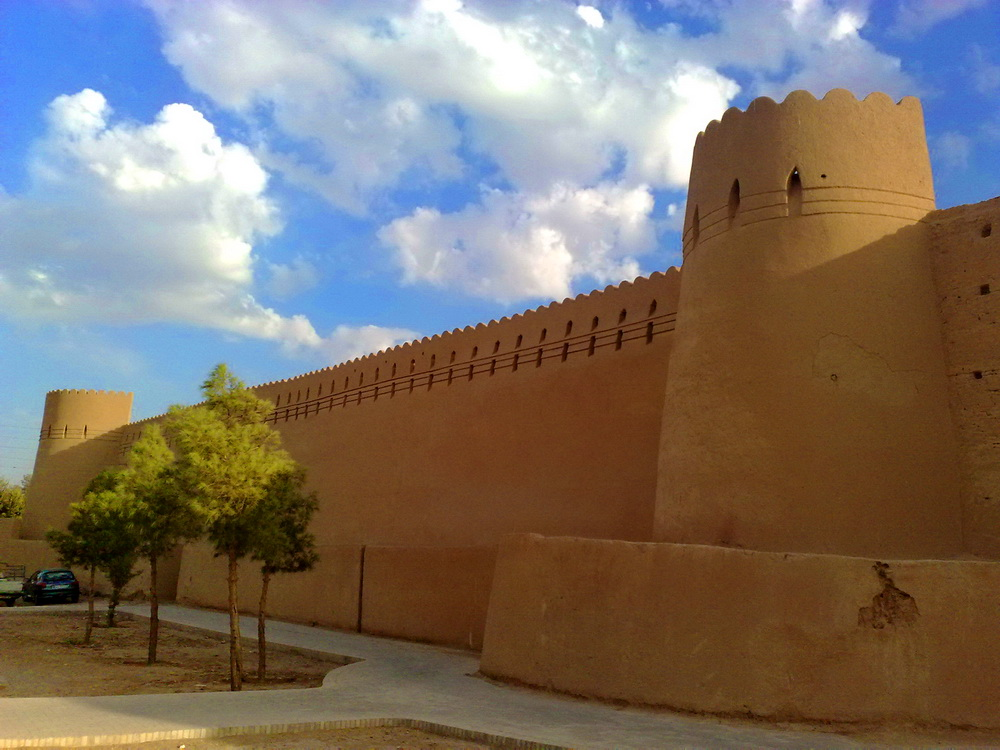
City walls in Yazd, commissioned by Faramurz

At times Muhammad ibn Rustam Dushmanziyar acted as an ally of the Buyids; when Shams al-Dawla was faced with a revolt in Hamadan, for example, he turned to the Kakuyids for aid. Shortly after Shams al-Daula died, he was succeeded by Sama' al-Dawla, however, the Kakuyids invaded and took control of Hamadan in 1023 or 1024. They then moved on and seized Hulwan from the 'Annazids. The Buyid Musharrif al-Dawla, who ruled over Fars and Iraq, forced the Kakuyids to withdraw from Hulwan, but they retained Hamadan. Peace was made between the two sides, and a matrimonial alliance was eventually arranged.

Muhammad ibn Rustam Dushmanziyar was succeeded in 1041 by his son Faramurz. While in Hamadan another Kakuyid, Garshasp I, took power. In 1095, Garshasp II became the new emir of the Kakuyid dynasty, and was later killed at the Battle of Qatwan in 1141. Faramurz's reign was cut short by the Seljuks, who after a year-long siege of Isfahan took the city in 1051 or 1052. Despite this, Faramurz was given Yazd and Abarkuh in fief by the Seljuks. The Kakuyids remained the governors of these provinces until sometime in the mid-12th century; their rule during this time was known for the construction of mosques, canals and fortifications.

== Kakuyid rulers ==
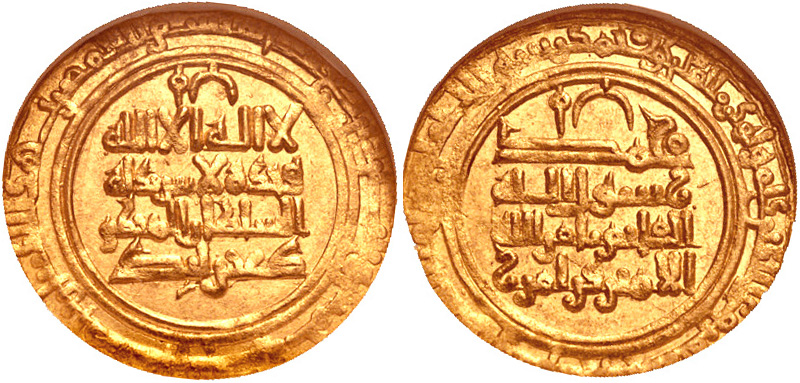
Coin of Faramurz, Emir of the Kakuyid dynasty

- Muhammad ibn Rustam Dushmanziyar (1008–1041)
- Faramurz ibn Muhammad (1041–1070's) – Isfahan, later in Yazd and Abarkuh
- Garshasp I ibn Muhammad (1041–1048) – Hamadan, Nihawand, Borujerd and western Jibal
- Ali ibn Faramurz (1070's –1095) – Yazd. Married Chaghri Beg's daughter, Arslan Khatun Khadija, in 1076–1077.
- Garshasp II (1095–1141)

== Family tree ==
Sharwin (Sharwin III?)
Sayyida Shirin | Rustam Dushmanziyar
Muhammad
Faramurz | Garshasp I | Abu Harb
Ali
Garshasp II

== Sources ==
- Bosworth, C. E. (1975). "The early Ghaznavids". In Frye, Richard N. (ed.). The Cambridge History of Iran: From the Arab Invasion to the Saljuqs. Vol. 4. Cambridge: Cambridge University Press. pp. 162–197. ISBN 0-521-20093-8.
- Bosworth, C. E. (1968). "The Political and Dynastic History of the Iranian World (A.D. 1000–1217)". In Boyle, John Andrew (ed.). The Cambridge History of Iran: The Saljuq and Mongol Periods. Vol. 5. Cambridge: Cambridge University Press. pp. 1–202. ISBN 0-521-06936-X.
- Bosworth, C. E. (1970). "Dailamīs in Central Iran: The Kākūyids of Jibāl and Yazd". Iran. 8: 73–95. doi:10.2307/4299634. JSTOR 4299634. (registration required)
- Bosworth, C. Edmund (1998). "Kākūyids". In Yarshater, Ehsan (ed.). Encyclopædia Iranica. Vol. XV/4: Kafir Kala–Ḵamsa of Jamāli. London and New York: Routledge & Kegan Paul. pp. 359–362. ISBN 978-1-934283-26-4.
- Bosworth, C. Edmund (1984). "ʿAlāʾ-al-dawla Moḥammad". In Yarshater, Ehsan (ed.). Encyclopædia Iranica. Vol. XV: Joči–Kašḡari, Saʿd-al-Din. London and New York: Routledge & Kegan Paul. pp. 773–774. ISBN 978-1-934283-29-5.
- Bosworth, C. Edmund (1983). "Abū Manṣūr Farāmarz". In Yarshater, Ehsan (ed.). Encyclopædia Iranica. Vol. XV/3: Julfa I. Safavid period–Kafir Kala. London and New York: Routledge & Kegan Paul. pp. 335–336. ISBN 978-1-934283-21-9.
- Bürgel, Ch.; Mottahedeh, R. (1988). "ʿAŻOD-AL-DAWLA, ABŪ ŠOJĀʾ FANNĀ ḴOSROW". In Yarshater, Ehsan (ed.). Encyclopædia Iranica. Vol. III/3: Azerbaijan IV–Bačča(-ye) Saqqā. London and New York: Routledge & Kegan Paul. pp. 265–269. ISBN 978-0-71009-115-4.
- Busse, Heribert [in German] (1975). "Iran under the Buyids". In Frye, Richard N. (ed.). The Cambridge History of Iran: From the Arab Invasion to the Saljuqs. Vol. 4. Cambridge: Cambridge University Press. pp. 250–305. ISBN 0-521-20093-8.
- Frye, R. N. (1960). "Bāwand". In Gibb, H. A. R.; Kramers, J. H.; Lévi-Provençal, E.; Schacht, J.; Lewis, B. & Pellat, Ch. (eds.). The Encyclopaedia of Islam, Second Edition. Volume I: A–B. Leiden: E. J. Brill. p. 1110. OCLC 495469456.
- Heemskerk, Margaretha T. (2000). Suffering in the Mu'tazilite theology. Brill.
- Herzig, Edmund; Stewart, Sarah (2014). The Age of the Seljuqs. London and New York: Bloomsbury Publishing. pp. 1–200. ISBN 9780857725141.
- Huart, CL. (1993). "Kākōyids". E.J. Brill's First Encyclopaedia of Islam, Volume IIII. Leiden: BRILL. pp. 667–668. ISBN 9789004097902.
- Kennedy, Hugh (2004) [1986]. The Prophet and the Age of the Caliphates: The Islamic Near East from the 6th to the 11th Century (Second ed.). Harlow: Longman. ISBN 978-0-582-40525-7.
- Madelung, W. (1975). "The Minor Dynasties of Northern Iran". In Frye, Richard N. (ed.). The Cambridge History of Iran: From the Arab Invasion to the Saljuqs. Vol. 4. Cambridge: Cambridge University Press. pp. 198–249. ISBN 0-521-20093-8.
- Madelung, W. (1984). "Āl-e Bāvand (Bavandids)". In Yarshater, Ehsan (ed.). Encyclopædia Iranica. Vol. I/7: Ahriman–Alafrank. London and New York: Routledge & Kegan Paul. pp. 747–753. ISBN 978-0-71009-096-6.
- Meisami, Julie Scott (1999). Persian Historiography to the End of the Twelfth Century. Edinburgh University Press. pp. 1–319. ISBN 9780748612765.
- Nagel, Tilman (1990). "Buyids". In Yarshater, Ehsan (ed.). Encyclopædia Iranica. Vol. IV/6: Burial II–Calendars II. London and New York: Routledge & Kegan Paul. pp. 578–586. ISBN 978-0-71009-129-1.
- Potts, Daniel T. (2014). Nomadism in Iran: From Antiquity to the Modern Era. London and New York: Oxford University Press. pp. 1–558. ISBN 9780199330799.
- Spuler, Bertold (2014). Iran in the Early Islamic Period: Politics, Culture, Administration and Public Life between the Arab and the Seljuk Conquests, 633-1055. Brill. ISBN 978-90-04-28209-4.
