= Jibal =

Medieval Arabic name for a region/province in western Iran

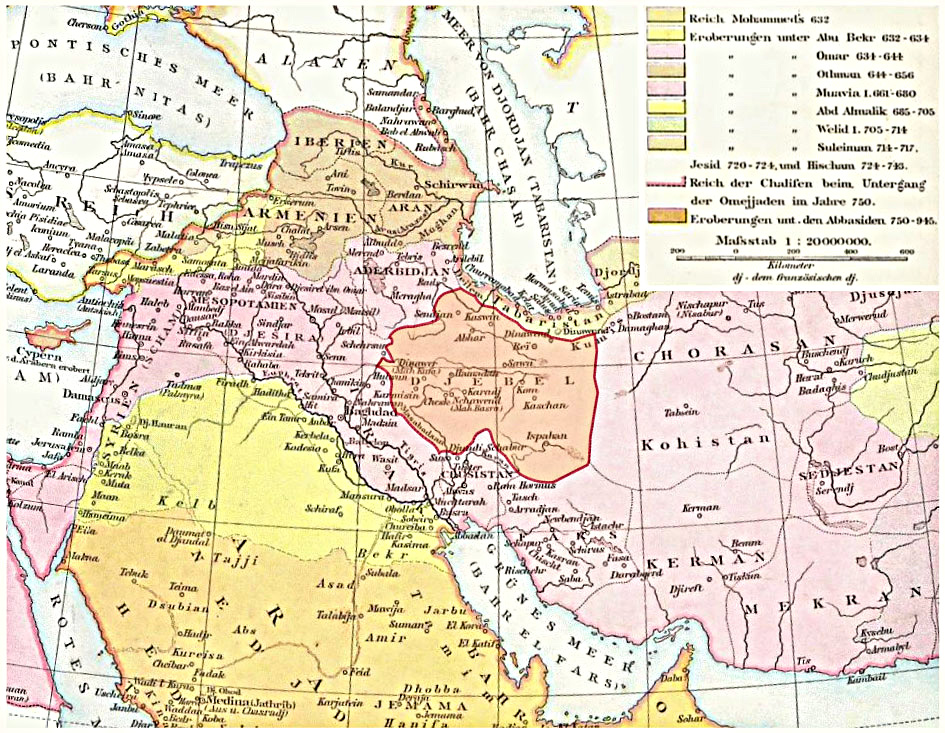
An 1886 map of the 10th-century Near East showing the province of Jibal (spelled "Djebel" on the map)

Jibāl (Arabic: جبال), also al-Jabal (Arabic: الجبل), was the name given by the Arabs to a region and province located in western Iran, under the Umayyad and Abbasid Caliphates.

Its name means "the Mountains", being the plural of jabal ("mountain, hill"), highlighting the region's mountainous nature in the Zagros. The region's boundaries were not precisely defined, but it was held to be bounded by the Maranjab Desert in the east, by Fars and Khuzistan in the south, by Iraq in the south-west and west, by Adharbayjan in the north-west, and by the Alborz Mountains in the north, making it roughly coterminous with the ancient country of Media.

For most of the 9th century, the area was ruled by an autonomous local dynasty, the Dulafids. Under the Abbasid Caliphate, Jibal was a separate province, with its capital usually at Rayy, until the Abbasids lost control of it in the early 10th century. In the late 10th and early 11th centuries, the larger northern portion of Jibal became one of the Buyid emirates, while the south passed to the Kakuyids. Between the 12th and 14th centuries, the name Jibal gradually fell out of use when its Iraqi Seljuk rulers moved their capital to the region, calling it ʿIrāq ʿAjamī ("Persian Iraq") to distinguish it from "Arab Iraq" in Mesopotamia.

The language spoken in Jibal was known as Pahlavi, known as Fahla or Bahla in Arabic records. Although Pahlavi literally means Parthian, the name had come to mean "heroic, old, ancient". "Pahlavi" most likely referred to a group of northwestern Iranian languages and dialects, which are still spoken today, such as Talysh, Southern Tati, or variants of Adhari.

== Sources ==
- Bosworth, C. E. (1998). "ʿERĀQ-E ʿAJAM(Ī)". In Yarshater, Ehsan (ed.). Encyclopædia Iranica. Vol. VIII/5: English IV–Eršād al-zerāʿa. London and New York: Routledge & Kegan Paul. p. 538. ISBN 978-1-56859-054-7.
- Donner, Fred M. (1995). "DOLAFIDS". In Yarshater, Ehsan (ed.). Encyclopædia Iranica. Vol. VII/5: Divorce IV–Drugs. London and New York: Routledge & Kegan Paul. pp. 476–477. ISBN 978-1-56859-023-3.
- Le Strange, Guy (1905). The Lands of the Eastern Caliphate: Mesopotamia, Persia, and Central Asia, from the Moslem Conquest to the Time of Timur. Cambridge: Cambridge University Press.
- Lockhart, L. (1965). "D̲j̲ibāl". In Lewis, B.; Pellat, Ch. & Schacht, J. (eds.). The Encyclopaedia of Islam, Second Edition. Volume II: C–G. Leiden: E. J. Brill. p. 534. doi:10.1163/1573-3912_islam_SIM_2068. OCLC 495469475.
- Paul, Ludwig (2000). "Persian Language i. Early New Persian". In Yarshater, Ehsan (ed.). Encyclopædia Iranica (Online ed.). Encyclopædia Iranica Foundation.
