= List of battles involving the Seljuk Empire =

This is an incomplete list of battles fought by the Seljuk Empire.

Azerbaijan	Turkmenistan	Turkey	Afghanistan	Iran	Iraq	Uzbekistan	Syria	Georgia

( Color legend for the location of the battle )

Year	Name	Location	Seljuk commander	Opponent	Victor
1032	Battle of Dabusiyya		Ali-Tegin & Seljuk allies	Altun Tash (Ghaznavid general)	Indecisive
1035	Battle of Nasa	Tabaristan	Chaghri Beg	Begtoghdi (Ghaznavid chamberlain)	Seljuq Turks
1038	Battle of Sarakhs	Sarakhs	Tughril	Abu'l-Fadl Suri (Ghaznavid governor of Khurasan)	Seljuq Turks
1040	Battle of Dandanaqan	near Merv	Chaghri Beg, Tughril	Mas'ud I of Ghazni (Ghaznavid Sultan)	Seljuq Turks
November 1040	Siege of Zaranj	Zaranj	Ertash (Seljuq Turks)	Abu l-Fadl (Ghaznavid commander)	Abu l-Fadl joined Seljuq Turks and Zaranj was occupied.
1043-44		Tokharistan	Alp Arslan	Mawdud (Ghaznavid Sultan)	Seljuq Turks
1045-6		near Zaranj	Ertash (Seljuq Turks)		Ghaznavids
1046	Battle of Ganja	near Ganja	Qutalmish	Byzantine army	Seljuk Turks
1048	Battle of Kapetrou	near Erzurum	İbrahim Yinal; Qutalmish	Katakalon Kekaumenos (Byzantine general)	Seljuk Turks
1051	Battle of Hupyan	Hupyan	Alp Arslan	Toghrul of Ghazna (Ghaznavid general)	Ghaznavids
1063	Battle of Damghan	Damghan	Alp Arslan	Qutalmish	Alp Arslan
1064	Siege of Akhalkalaki	Akhalkalaki	Alp Arslan	Bagrat IV of Georgia	Alp Arslan
1064	Siege of Ani (1064)	Ani	Alp Arslan	Byzantine Empire	Alp Arslan
1071	Battle of Manzikert	Malazgirt	Alp Arslan	Emperor Romanos IV	Alp Arslan
1074	Battle of Partskhisi	Partskhisi	Savtegin	George II of Georgia	George II
1086	Battle of Aleppo	near Aleppo, Syria	Suleiman ibn Qutalmish	Tutush I	Tutush I
1095	Battle of Ray	near Rey, Iran	Tutush I Emir of Damascus	Barkiyaruq; Sultan Seljuk Empire	Barkiyaruq
1097	Battle of Dorylaeum	Dorylaeum	Kilij Arslan I, Gazi Gümüshtigin	Crusaders: Bohemond of Taranto; Robert Curthose; Godfrey of Bouillon; Adhemar of Le Puy	Crusader victory
1107	Siege of Shahdiz	Shahdiz, near Isfahan, Iran	Muhammad I Tapar	Da'i Ahmad ibn Abd al-Malik ibn Attash of the Nizari Ismaili state	Seljuk Turks
1107	Battle of Khabur River	near Mosul, Iraq	Kilij Arslan I	Muhammad I Tapar	Muhammad I Tapar
1115	Battle of Sarmin	Sarmin, Syria	Bursuq bin Bursuq of Hamadan	Roger of Salerno; Regent of Antioch	Roger of Salerno
1117	2nd Battle of Ghazni	plain of Shahrabad, near Ghazni	Ahmad Sanjar; Bahram-Shah	Arslan Shah (Sultan of Ghaznavid Empire)	Ahmad Sanjar (Sultan of the Great Seljuq Empire)
1119	Battle of Saveh	Saveh, Iran	Mahmud II of Great Seljuq	Ahmad Sanjar	Ahmad Sanjar
1121	Battle of Didgori	Didgori Valley	Ilghazi	David IV of Georgia	David IV
1141	Battle of Qatwan	north Samarkand	Ahmad Sanjar, Sultan of the Seljuk Empire	Yelü Dashi, Emperor of the Qara Khitai	Qara Khitai
1152	Battle of Nab	Near Herat	Ala al-Din Husayn(Ghurid)	Ahmad Sanjar, Sultan of the Seljuk Empire	Ahmad Sanjar
1176	Battle of Myriokephalon	Near Lake Beyşehir	Kilij Arslan II; Sultan of Rum	Manuel I Komnenos; Byzantine Emperor	Sultanate of Rum
1194	Battle of Ray	near Rey, Iran	Tughril III, Sultan of the Seljuk Empire	Qutluq Inandj; Khwarazmian general	Khwarazmians
1243	Battle of Kose Dag	between Erzincan and Gümüşhane	Kaykhusraw II; Sultan of Rum	Baiju; Mongol general	Mongols

== Sources ==
- Ibn al-Athir, 'Izz al-Din (2002). Hillenbrand, Carole (ed.). The Annals of the Saljuq Turks. Translated by Richards, D.S. Routledge.
- Basan, Osman Aziz (2010). The Great Seljuqs: A History. Routledge.
- Beihammer, Alexander D. (2011). "Defection across the Border of Islam and Christianity: Apostasy and Cross-Cultural Interaction in Byzantine-Seljuk Relations". Speculum. 86, No. 3 July.
- Biran, Michal (2005). The Empire of the Qara Khitai in Eurasian History: Between China and the Islamic World. Cambridge University Press.
- Bosworth, C.E. (1968). "The Political and Dynastic History of the Iranian World (A.D. 1000-1217)". In Boyle, J.A. (ed.). The Cambridge History of Iran: The Saljuq and Mongol Period. Vol. 5. Cambridge University Press. pp. 1–202.
- Bosworth, C.E. (1977). The Later Ghaznavids:Splendour and Decay. Columbia University Press.
- Coene, Frederik (2009). The Caucasus - An Introduction. Routledge.
- Grousset, Rene (1991). The Empire of the Steppes: a History of Central Asia. Translated by Walford, Naomi. Rutgers University Press.
- Magdalino, Paul (1993). The Empire of Manuel I Komnenos, 1143-1180. Cambridge University Press.
- Peacock, Andrew (2005). "Nomadic Society and the Seljūq Campaigns in Caucasia". Iran and the Caucasus. Brill: 205–230.
- Rayfield, Donald (2012). Edge of Empires: A History of Georgia. Reaktion books.
- Runciman, Steven (1969). "The First Crusade: Antioch to Ascalon". In Setton, Kenneth M.; Baldwin, Marshall W. (eds.). A History of the Crusade. pp. 280–307.
- Safi, Omid (2006). The Politics of Knowledge in Premodern Islam: Negotiating Ideology and Religious Inquiry. University of North Carolina Press.
- Sicker, Martin (2000). The Islamic World in Ascendancy: From the Arab Conquests to the Siege of Vienna. Greenwood Publishers.
- Smail, R. C. (1995). Crusading Warfare, 1097-1193. Cambridge University Press.
- Theotokis, Georgios; Meško, Marek, eds. (2020). War in Eleventh-Century Byzantium. Routledge.
- Tucker, Spencer (2011). Battles that Changed History: An Encyclopedia of World Conflict. ABC-CLIO.
- Turan, Osman (1970). "Anatolia in the Period of the Seljuks and the Beyliks". In Holt, Peter Malcolm; Lambton, Ann K. S.; Lewis, Bernard (eds.). The Cambridge History of Islam. Cambridge University Press.
- Wolper, Ethel Sara (1995). Necipoğlu, Gülru (ed.). "The Politics of Patronage:Political Change and the Construction of Dervish Lodges in Sivas". Muqarnas: An Annual on Islamic Art and Architecture. XII. Brill.
