= Ibrahim of Ghazna =

Ghaznavid sultan from 1059 to 1099

Ibrahim
- Ghaznavid Sultan; Zahir ad-Dawlah ظھیر الدولہ; Help of the State
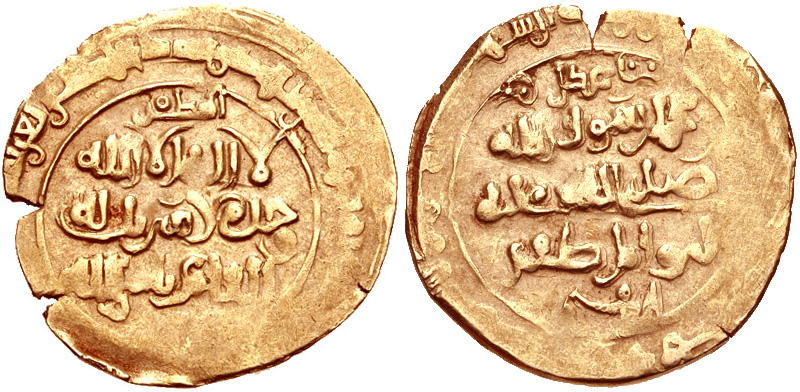

Sultan of Ghaznavid Empire
- Reign: 4 April 1059 – 25 August 1099
- Predecessor: Farrukh-Zad
- Successor: Mas'ūd III
- Born: c. 1033; Ghaznavid Empire
- Died: 25 August 1099 (aged 66); Ghaznavid Empire
- Burial: 25–26 August 1099; Palace of Sultan Mas'ud III
- Issue: Mas'ūd III
Names
- Ibrahim bin Mas'ud
- House: House of Sabuktigin
- Father: Ma'sud I
- Religion: Sunni Islam

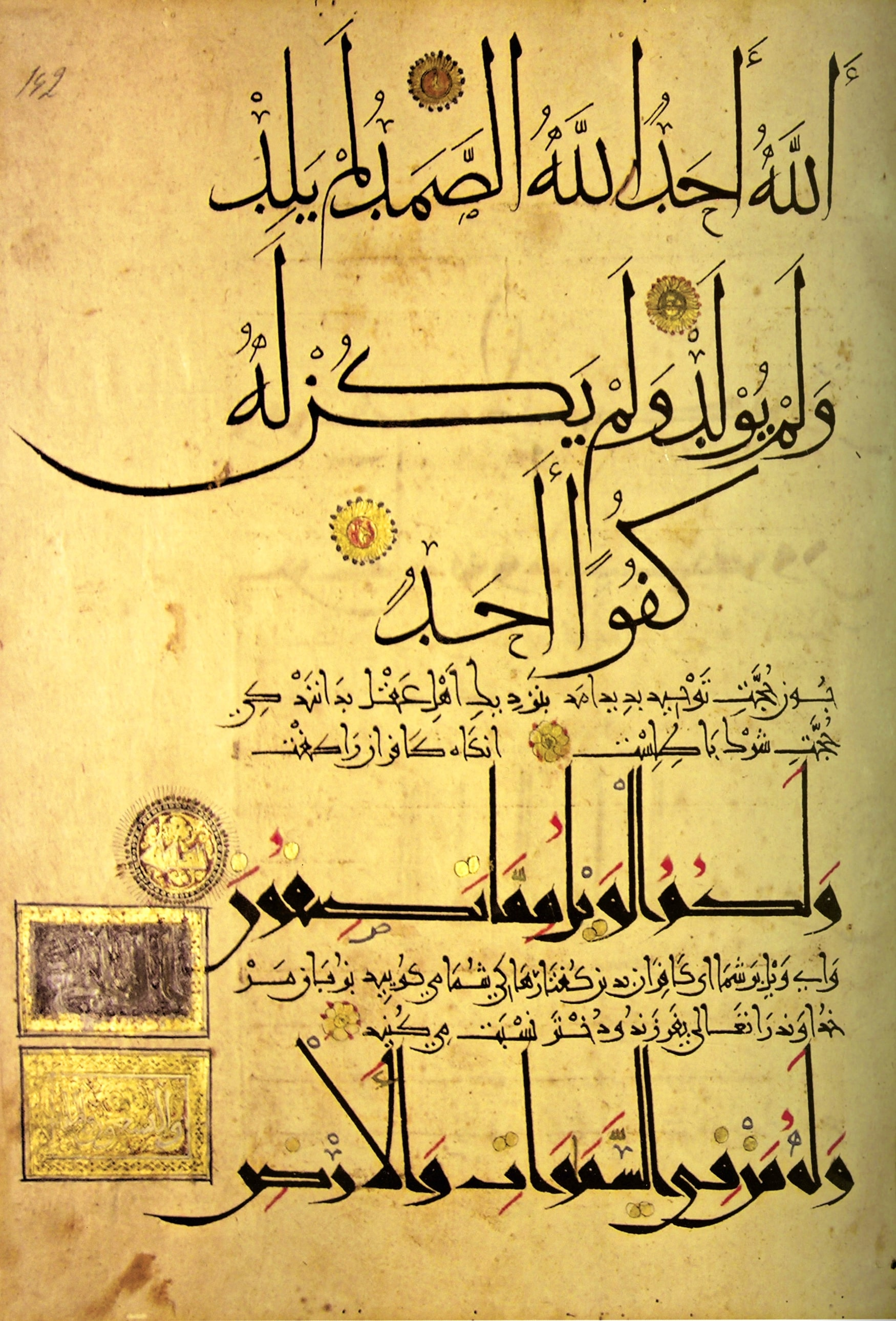
Page from the Qur'an made for Ibrahim by calligrapher and illuminator Osman b. Hosayn al-Warraq al-Ghaznavi. Qur'anic text in bold, angular script, Persian translation and commentary of Abu Nasr Ahmad b. Mohammad Haddadi (d. after 1009) in a lighter, rounded script. It is the earliest dated manuscript with a Persian translation and commentary accompanying the Qur'anic text. Ghazna (probably), 1091. Topkapı Palace Museum Library

Ibrahim of Ghazna (b. 1033 – d. 1099) was sultan of the Ghaznavid empire from April 1059 until his death in 1099. Having been imprisoned at the fortress of Barghund, he was one of the Ghaznavid princes that escaped the usurper Toghrul's massacre in 1052. After his brother Farrukh-Zad took power, Ibrahim was sent to the fortress of Nay, the same fortress where the poet Masud Sa'd Salman would later be imprisoned for ten years.

Following Farrukh's death, Ibrahim was recognized as the last surviving male Ghaznavid. A military escort was sent to fetch him from Nay and he entered Ghazna on 6 April 1059. Ibrahim's reign was considered a golden age for the Ghaznavid empire, due to the treaties and cultural exchanges with the Great Seljuq empire.

== Life ==
Ibrahim was born during his father's campaign into Gurgan and Tabaristan (c. 1033). He reportedly had 40 sons and 36 daughters. One of these daughters married the great-great-grandfather of the historian Juzjani.

Ibrahim's son, Mas'ud, married Gawhar Khatun, daughter of Seljuq sultan Malik Shah, as a condition of peace between the Great Seljuq empire and the Ghaznavid empire.

Every year Ibrahim would copy the Quran by hand and send it to the caliph in Mecca.

== Reign ==
Ibrahim rebuilt towns and settlements and instituted a vigorous policy for the restoration of social peace and economic prosperity in the Ghaznavid empire, which had been initiated by his brother Farrukh-Zad. At an unknown time, Ibrahim also arrested his vizier Abu Sahl Khujandi for unknown reasons. In 1060, at the request of the nobles of Ghur, Ibrahim invaded the region and deposed its ruler Abbas ibn Shith. He then had the latter's son Muhammad ibn Abbas placed on the Ghurid throne.

Ibrahim sent his son, Mahmud, with an army of ghazis consisting of 40,000 cavalry to raid Doaba in the eastern Punjab, between 1063 and 1070. Following Mahmud's successful campaigns into India, Ibrahim initially appointed him governor of India. He occupied temporarily the cities of Agra and Kannauj. He also attacked and captured Malwa. However, for reasons unknown, Mahmud fell out of favor, was imprisoned in the fortress of Nay and his brother, Mas'ud, took his place as governor of India. Shorn of its western land, it was increasingly sustained by riches accrued from raids across Northern India, where it faced stiff resistance from Indian rulers such as the Paramara of Malwa and the Gahadvala of Kannauj.

After 14 years of peace with the Seljuks, Ibrahim, in January 1073, sent an army into Sakalkand. His army met with initial success, capturing Seljuk sultan Malik Shah's uncle, Usman Chaghri Beg, who was sent to Ghazna. However, an army led by the Seljuk Amir Gumushtegin Bilge Beg and Anushtegin Gharchai, drove out the Ghaznavid army that had devastated Sakalkand. In 1077/8, Ibrahim appointed Abd al-Hamid Shirazi as his vizier.

In 1079, Ibrahim led a campaign into India, besieging a fortress in Pakpattan 120 Parasang (480 miles) from Lahore, taking it on 13 August 1079. The military commander at Lahore, Abdul Najam Zarir Shaybani, carried out successful raids against the Hindu cities of Benares, Thanesar, and Kannauj. Another main achievement of Ibrahim's reign was the rise of Lahore as a great cultural center under the viceroyalty of his grandson Shirzad.

== Death ==
Ibrahim died on 25 August 1099 ending a reign of 40 years. His tomb lies in the northeastern part of medieval Ghazna near Shaikh Radi d-Din 'Ali Lala's tomb in the Palace of Sultan Mas'ud III.

== See also ==
- Battle of Ghazni
- Hussain Shah

== Sources ==
- Bakshi, S.R.; Gajrani, S.; Singh, Hari (1997). Early Aryans to Swaraj. Vol. II. Brill.
- Bosworth, C.E. (1968). "The Iranian World". In Boyle, John Andrew (ed.). The Cambridge History of Iran. Vol. 5. Cambridge University Press.
- Bosworth, C.E. (1977). The Later Ghaznavids. Columbia University Press. ISBN 978-0-85224-315-2.
- Bosworth, C.E. (2007). "Ghaznavids". Encyclopedia Iranica.
- Bosworth, C.E. (2011). "ʿAbd-Al-Ḥamid b. Ahmad b. ʿAbd-Al-Ṣamad Širazi". Encyclopaedia Iranica.
- Dames, M. Longworth (1993). "Ghaznavids". In Houtsma, M. Th. (ed.). E.J. Brill's First Encyclopaedia of Islam, 1913–1936. Brill.
- Ibn al-Athir (2002). The Annal of the Saljuq Turks. Translated by Richards, D.S. Routledge.
- Wink, André (1997). Al-Hind the Making of the Indo-Islamic World: The Slave Kings and the Islamic Conquests 11th–13th centuries. Vol. II. Brill.
- Ziad, Homayra (2006). "Ghaznavids". In Meri, Josef W. (ed.). Medieval Islamic Civilization. Vol. I. Taylor & Francis.

Ibrahim of Ghazna House of Sabuktegin Born: 1025 Died: 4 April 1059
Regnal titles
Preceded by Farrukh-Zad	Sultan of the Ghaznavid Empire; 1059-1099	Succeeded by Mas'ud III
