= Mas'ud III of Ghazni =

Ghaznavid sultan from 1099 to 1115

Mas'ūd III of Ghazna
- Ghaznavid Sultan; Ala ad-Dawlah علاء الدولہ (Blessing of the State); Jalāl ad-Dīn; Nizam ad-Dīn wa-d-Dunyā; Nāsir Khalīfat Allāh
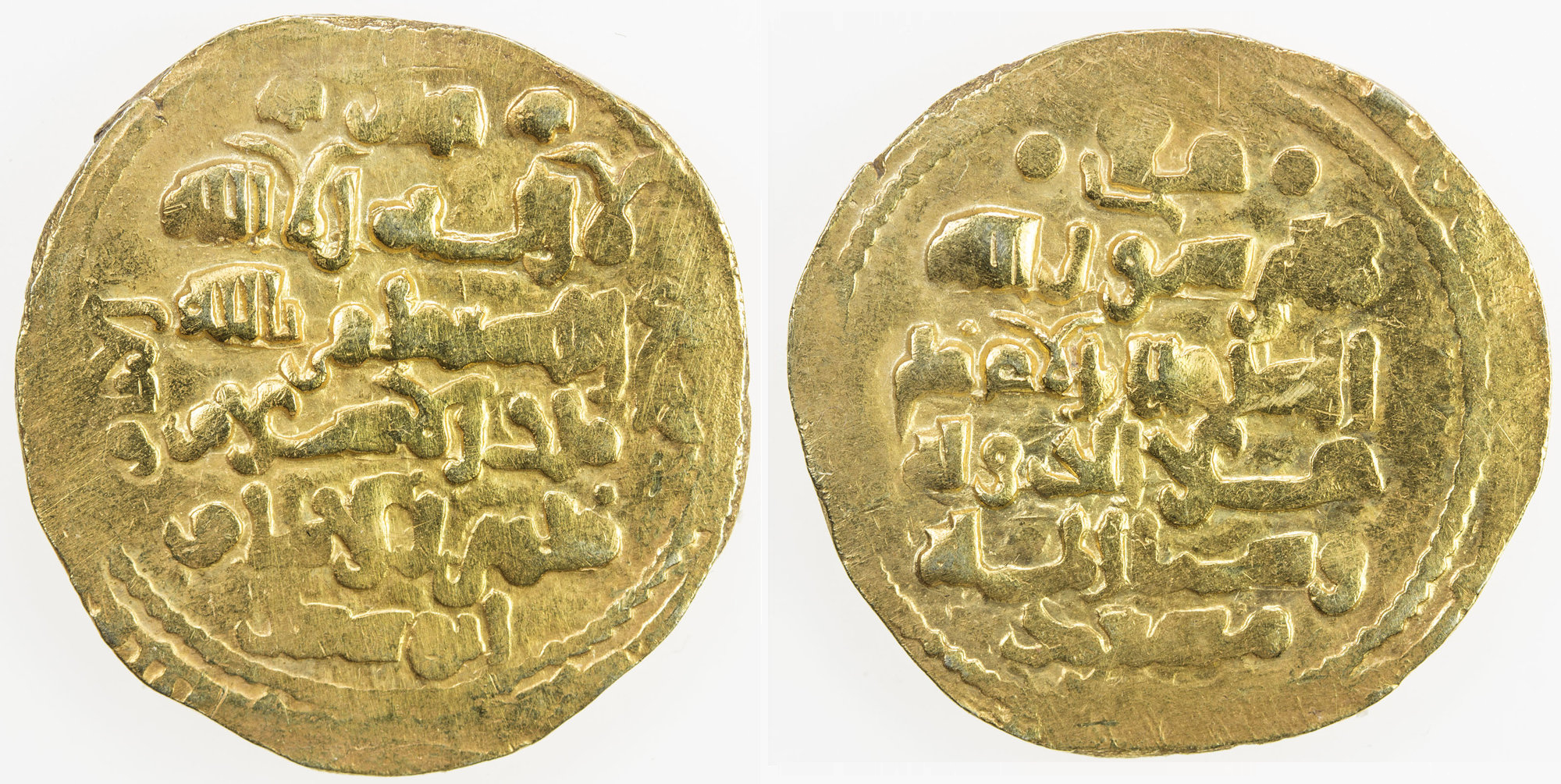

Sultan of Ghaznavid Empire
- Reign: 25 August 1099 – March 1115
- Predecessor: Ibrahim
- Successor: Shir-Zad
- Born: c. 1061; Ghazni; Ghaznavid Empire
- Died: March 1115 (aged 53–54); Ghaznavid Empire
- Spouse: Fülane Khatun; Gawhar Khatun
- Issue: Shir-Zad of Ghazna; Arslan-Shah of Ghazna; Bahram-Shah of Ghazna
Names
- Mas'ūd bin Ibrahim
- House: Ghaznavid Dynasty
- Father: Ibrahim
- Religion: Sunni Islam

Mas'ūd III of Ghazna (b. 1061 – d. 1115), was a sultan of the Ghaznavid Empire and son of the Ghaznavid sultan, Ibrahim of Ghazna

== Life ==
Mas'ūd bin Ibrahim was born in 1061 in Ghazni. Prior to his reign, in 1082-83, Mas'ūd III married Seljuk princess Mahd-i 'Iraq Jauhar Khatun bint Malik Shah.

== Reign ==
Mas'ud III's reign spanned 16 years (1099-1115). He primarily ruled over the territories of Afghanistan, Northwest India, and Pakistan. He struck coins in the name of Caliph Al-Mustazhir and continued the Ghaznavid policy of acknowledging the supremacy of the Abbasid Caliphate, with its capital in Baghdad. Friendly relations were maintained with the eastern Seljuks during his reign.

In 1112, Mas'ūd III built the Palace of Sultan Mas'ud III in Ghazni, Afghanistan. Mas'ūd III was also responsible for the construction of one of the two "Towers of Victory", also known as the Minarets of Ghazni.

Following Sultan Mas'ūd III's death in 1115, a four-year period of increased instability ensued due to the internal struggle for succession amongst his sons, Shīr-Zād (r. 1115-1116), Malik Arslan (r. 1116-1117), and Bahrām Shāh (r. 1117-1157). With the assistance and political backing of the eastern Seljuk sultan Sunjar Bahram, Shāh defeated his brother Arslan and ascended the throne as a Seljuk vassal following the Battle of Ghazni in 1117.

== Architecture ==
=== Minaret of Mas'ud III in Ghazni ===
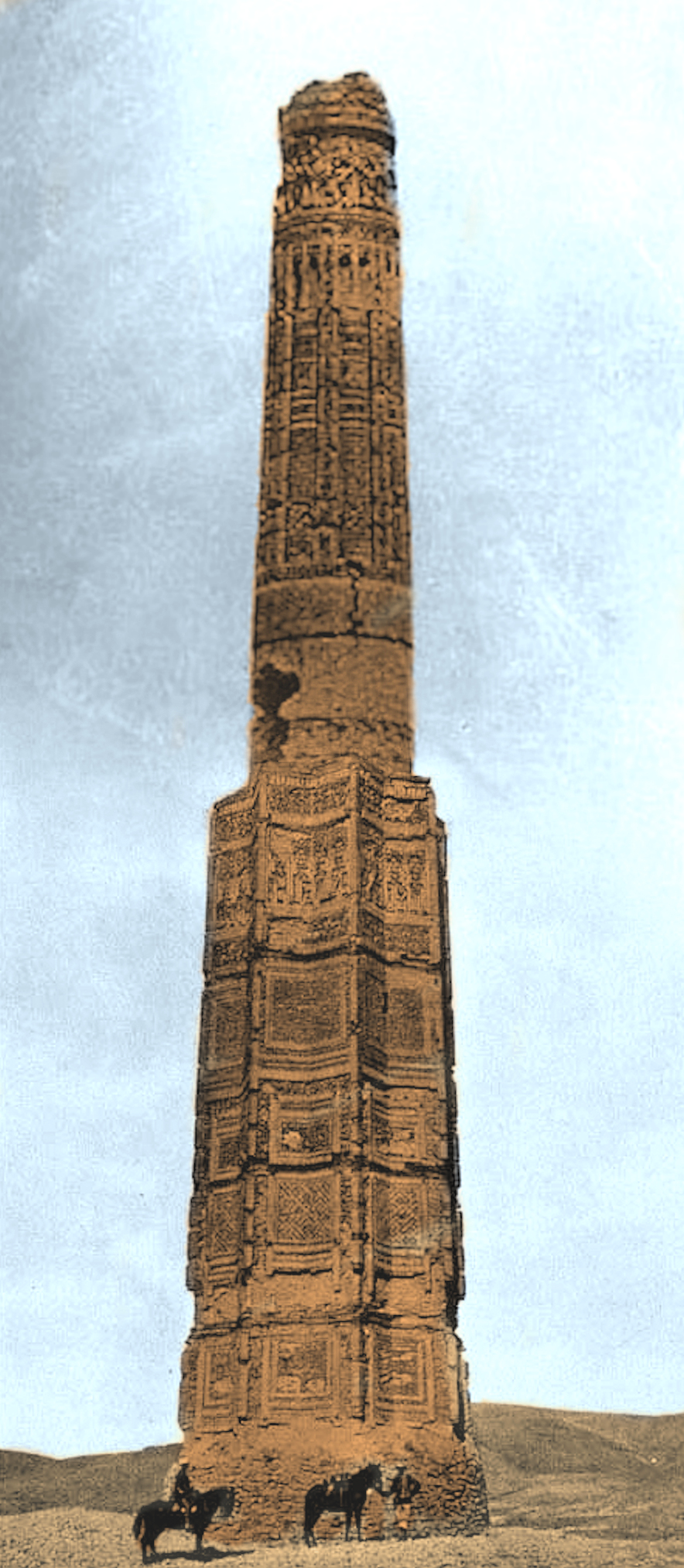
Mas'ud III b. Ibrahim Ghazni minaret, Ghazni, built between 1099 and 1115 CE

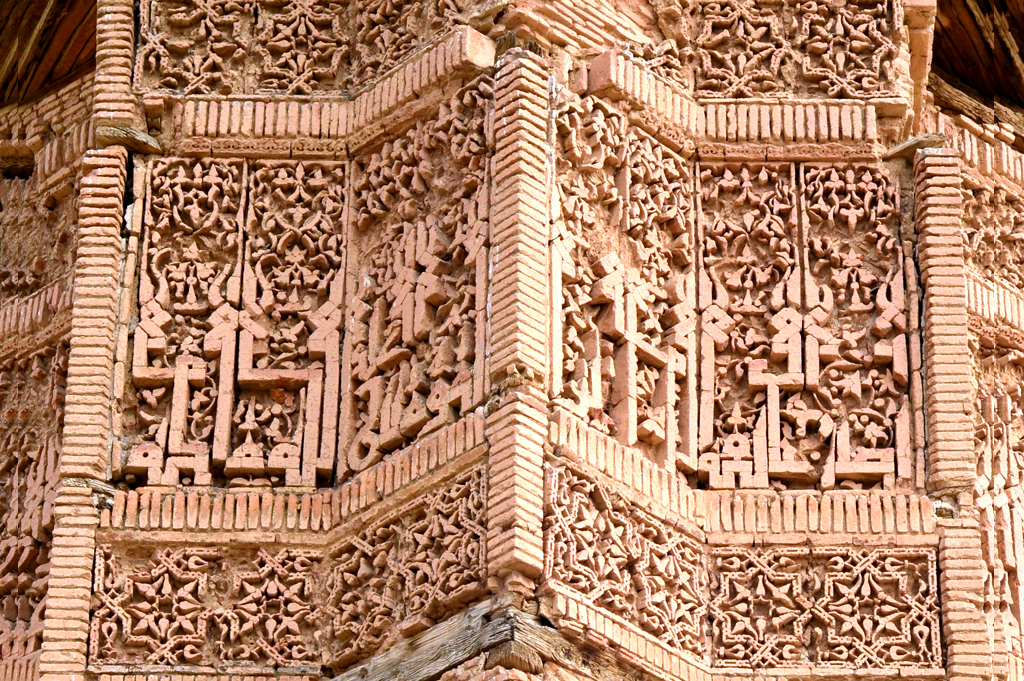
Detail of the intricate brickwork on the Mas'ud III Tower

=== Palace of Mas'ud III in Ghazni ===
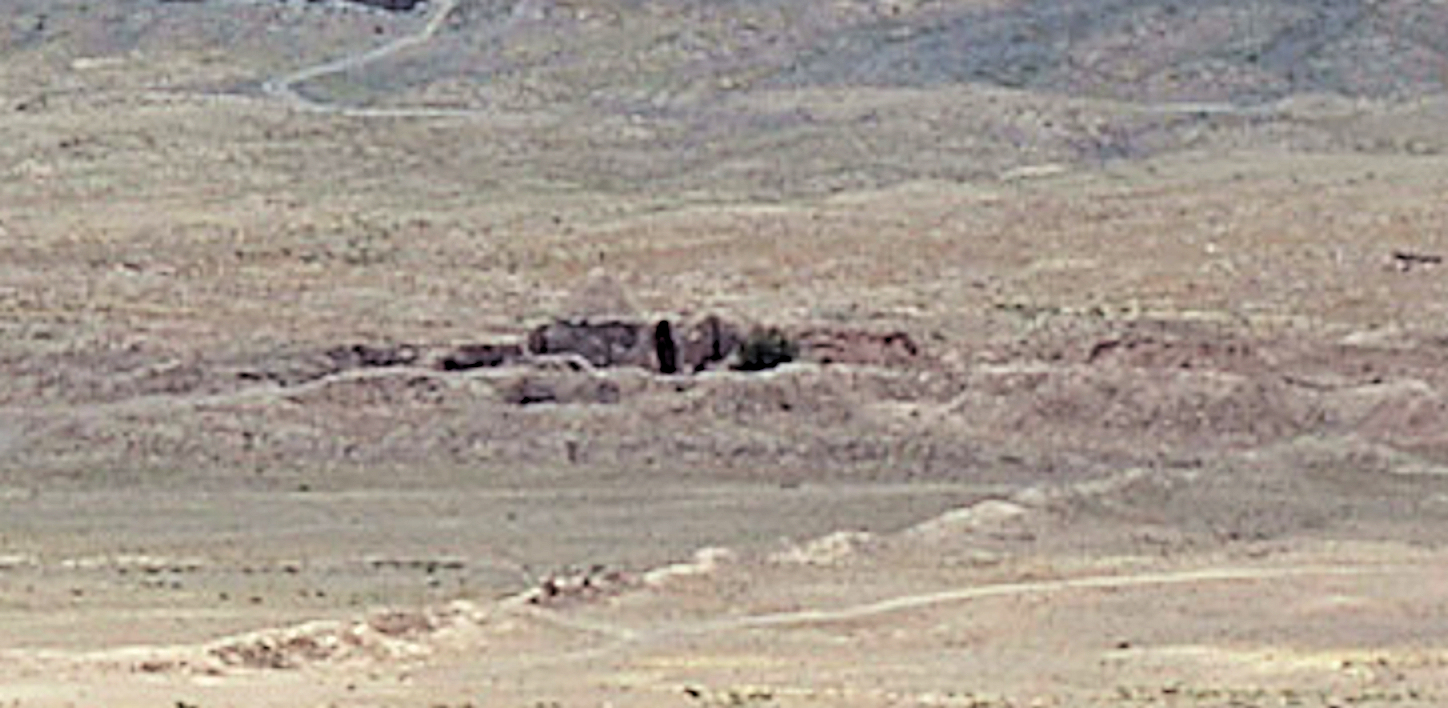
Remains of the palace, to the east of Ghazni.

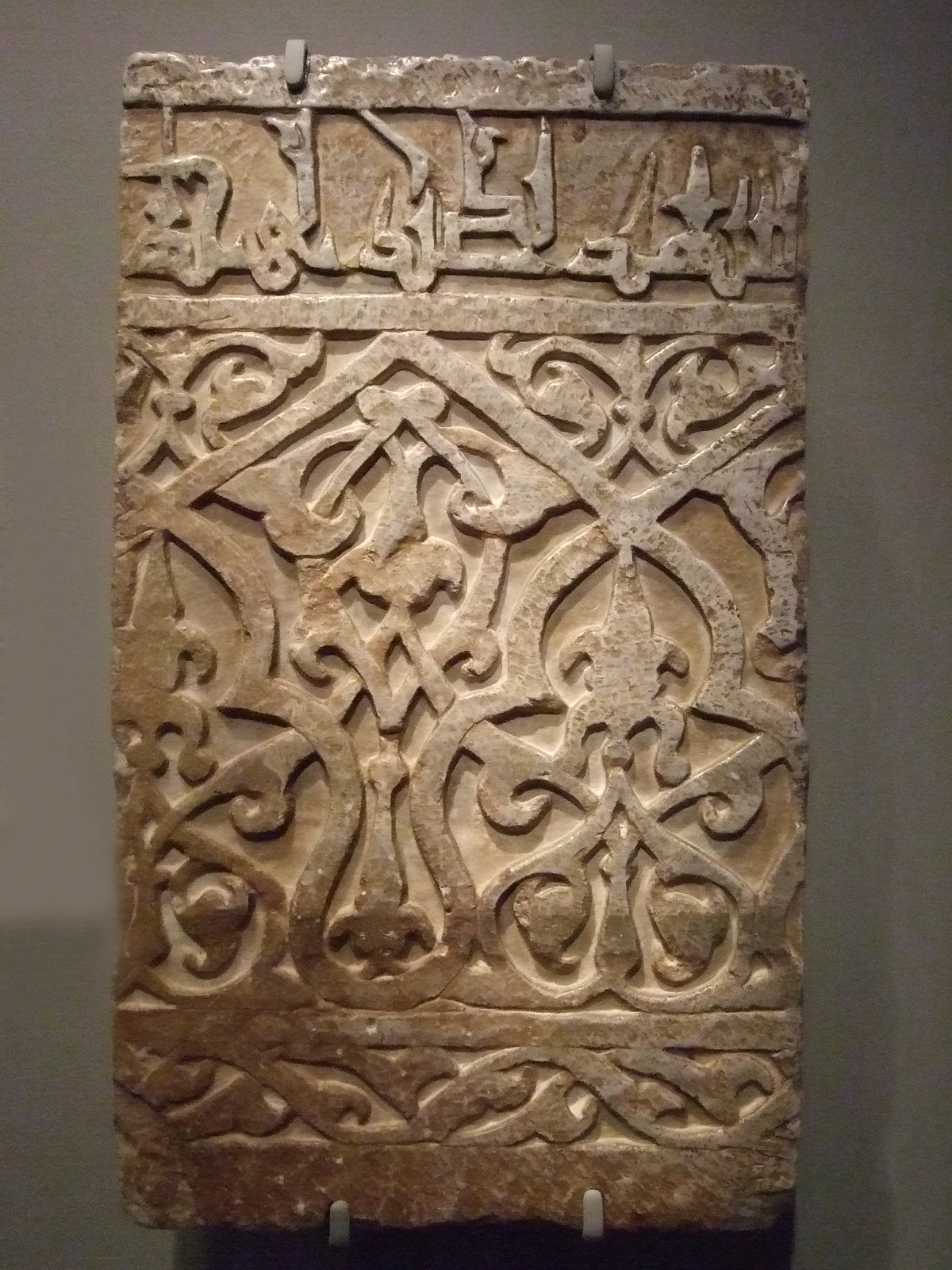
Ghaznavid panel from the reign of Mas ud III 1100-1150 CE

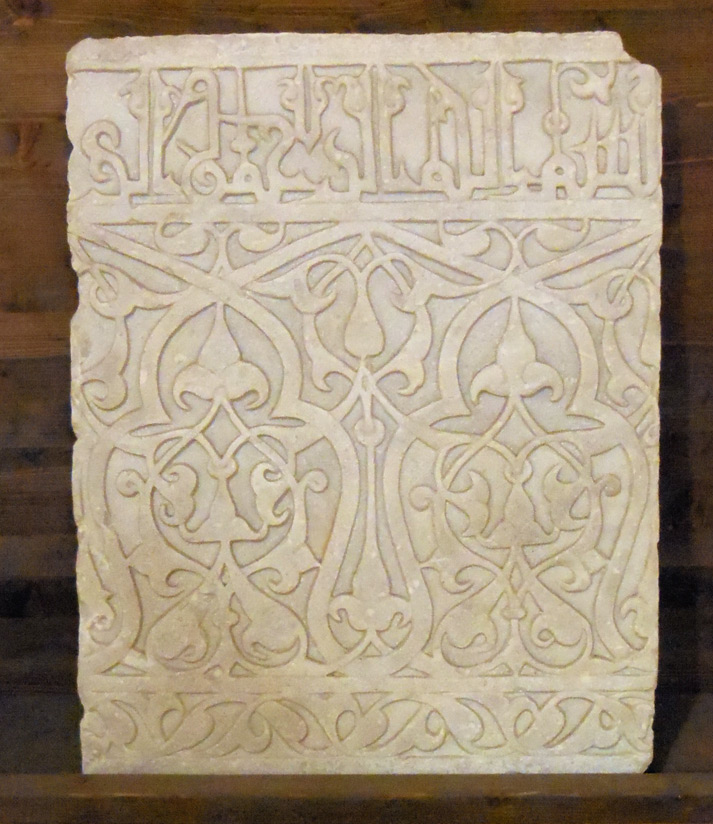
Carved relief from the Palace of Sultan Mas'ud III

== See also ==
- Ghazni under the Ghaznavids

== Sources ==
- Bosworth, C. E. (2006). "Ghaznavids". Encyclopaedia Iranica.
- Bosworth, Clifford Edmund (1977). The Later Ghaznavids: Splendour and Decay. Edinburgh University Press. ISBN 978-0-85224-315-2.

Mas'ud III of Ghazni House of Sabuktegin
Regnal titles
Preceded by Ibrahim	Sultan of the Ghaznavid Empire; 1099–1114/5	Succeeded by Shir-Zad
