= Abu'l-Fath Yusuf =

Vizier of the Ghaznavids

Abu'l-Fath Yusuf ibn Ya'qub (Persian: ابوالفتح یوسف بن یعقوب), was a Persian vizier of the Ghaznavid Sultan Arslan-Shah. Not much is known about the early life of Abu'l-Fath, except that he may have been the brother of Ghaznavid statesman Abu'l-Ala ibn Ya'qub Nakuk. In 1116, Abu'l-Fath was appointed by Arslan-Shah as his vizier, where Abu'l-Fath became highly influential and gained much power. However, this was short-lived; one year later, Arslan-Shah's brother Bahram-Shah, with the aid of the Seljuq Sultan Ahmad Sanjar, defeated and killed Arslan-Shah, and Bahram-Shah then took control over the Ghaznavid Empire. Abu'l-Fath fell from favor after Arslan-Shah's death, and probably shared the same fate as the latter.

== Sources ==
- Bosworth, C. E. "ABU'L-FATḤ YŪSOF". Encyclopaedia Iranica.
- Bosworth, C. E. (1995). The Later Ghaznavids: Splendour and Decay: The Dynasty in Afghanistan and Northern India 1040-1186. ISBN 9788121505772.

Unknown	Vizier of the Ghaznavid Empire; 1116 – 1117	Unknown
