= Battle of Ghazni (1151) =

Battle between Ghaznavids and Ghurids in 1151

Date	1151
Location	Ghazni, Afghanistan
Result	Ghurid victory

Belligerents
Ghurid dynasty	Ghaznavids

Commanders and leaders
Ala al-Din Husayn	Bahram-Shah of Ghazna

The Battle of Ghazni was fought in 1151 between the Ghurid army of Ala al-Din Husayn and the army of the Ghaznavid Sultan Bahram-Shah of Ghazna. The Ghurid ruler defeated Bahram-Shah, captured the city, and destroyed it as revenge for the execution of his brother Quṭb ud-Dīn in 1149.

Ala al-Din Husayn plundered and burnt Ghazni to ground. He slaughtered thousands of civilians and enslaved woman and children. All of Ghazni's buildings were dug out except the tomb of Mahmud of Ghazni.
