= Ghazni Minarets =

Former elaborately decorated minaret towers located in Ghazni city, Afghanistan

- Mas'ud III Minaret & Bahram Shah Minaret
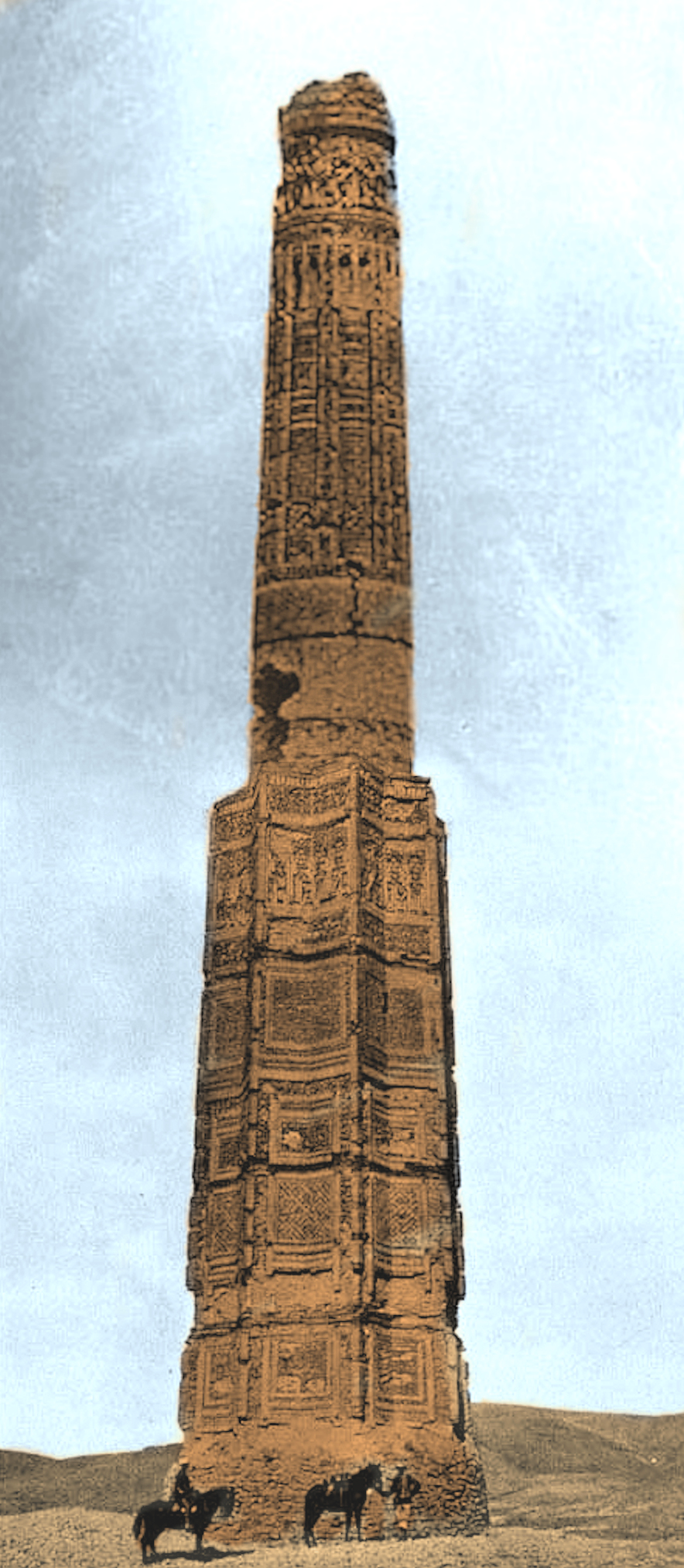
- Mas'ud III's minaret was at least 44 meters tall, before its cylindrical top half crumbled following an earthquake in 1902. It was built between 1099 and 1115 CE (photographic reconstruction).

- Location in Afghanistan Ghazni (West and Central Asia)
- 33°33′52.4″N 68°26′01.8″E
- Type: Minaret
- Location: Ghazni, Afghanistan
- Region: Ghazni Province

History
- Built: 12th century
- Built by: Masud III, Bahram-Shah of Ghazna

Site notes
- Material: Bricks
- Height: 20 m (66 ft)
- Condition: Endangered

The Ghazni Minarets are two elaborately decorated minaret towers located in Ghazni city, central Afghanistan. They were built in middle of the twelfth century and are the only surviving elements of the mosque of Bahram Shah. The two minarets are 600 meters (1968 feet) apart and lie in an open plain, north-east of Ghazni city.

The minarets had a height of 44 meters in the 19th century, before the top half of both minarets crumbled in an earthquake in 1902. Now the Bahram Shah Minaret stands at 20 meters (66 feet) tall and the Mas'ud III Minaret stands at 21 meters. Both are built of fired mud brick. The surface of the towers are decorated beautifully with intricate geometric patterns and Quranic verses on elaborate terracotta tiles. In the 1960s, both towers were fitted with sheet metal roofs in a limited preservation effort.

The ruins of the Palace of Sultan Mas'ud III are located near Mas'ud III's minaret.

== History ==
The 12th century minarets are the most famous monuments of Ghazni city and are among the last surviving remnants of the great Ghaznavid Empire. The two minarets are called, Mas'ud III Minaret (Manar-i Mas'ud III) and Bahram Shah Minaret (Manar-i Bahram Shah) after the ruler who built them, Mas'ud III (A.D. 1099–1115) and Bahram Shah (A.D. 1118–1157). The excavated palace of Mas'ud III lies nearby to the towers.

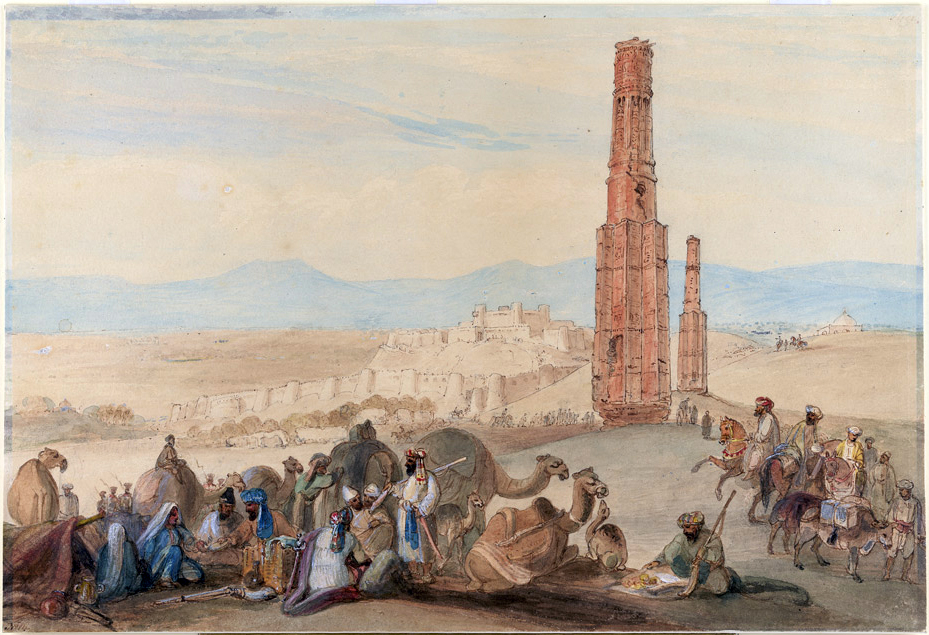
An 1839 painting shows the cylindrical upper sections of the minarets before their destruction in 1902 earthquake.

The minarets were taller before the upper sections were damaged and destroyed over time. Part of the Masud III minaret top was destroyed in an earthquake in 1902.

== Threats ==
Ghazni Minarets are not well preserved or protected. Both towers are in danger from natural elements and the political instability in Afghanistan. There are no basic security measures in place to prevent vandalism and the towers are in need of new roofing to prevent water infiltration into the towers.

The towers' facade contains intricate geometric patterns and Quranic inscriptions which are deteriorating rapidly with exposure to rain and snow. They are further affected by the nearby road and the area is subject to periodic flooding.

== Gallery ==
=== Mas'ud III Minaret ===
Mas'ud III's minaret is stylistically more complex, and uses a larger variety of decorative techniques, compared to the minaret of his son Bahram Shah. This minaret is made out of baked brick, as well as wooden frames for added structural integrity. Around the core of the structure there is a single spiraling staircase. The large terracotta tiles are split into 8 decorative bands. The bands contain a mix of Kufic and Naskh scripts, as well as decorative geometric and floral patterns carved in relief. The top three bands have details of knotted Kufic script surrounded by star patterns. On the main (middle) band, there are the names of Mas'ud III, the prophet, Orthodox caliphs and Imams Husayn and Hasan. On bands two and four there are large inlaid floral scrolls on the panels, while bands one and five contain the geometric motifs. The four lower panels contain cursive inscriptions of Victory sura of the Quran with a floral background.

The minaret was commissioned by the Ghaznavid Sultan Mas'ud III and was built during his reign. Mas'ud III was enthusiastic to embellish his capital of Ghazni with gardens, palaces, and monuments such as the minaret. He was known as the "Beneficent Sultan" and was wealthy enough to build such things.

An earthquake in 1902 collapsed the slimmer upper parts of both the Mas'ud III's minaret and Bahram Shah minaret. The Mas'ud III minaret stood 44 meters tall before the earthquake, but currently stands at 21 meters. The remaining base of the minaret forms an 8-sided star shape. To conserve the remaining structure, sheet metal protective roofing was installed in the 1960's.

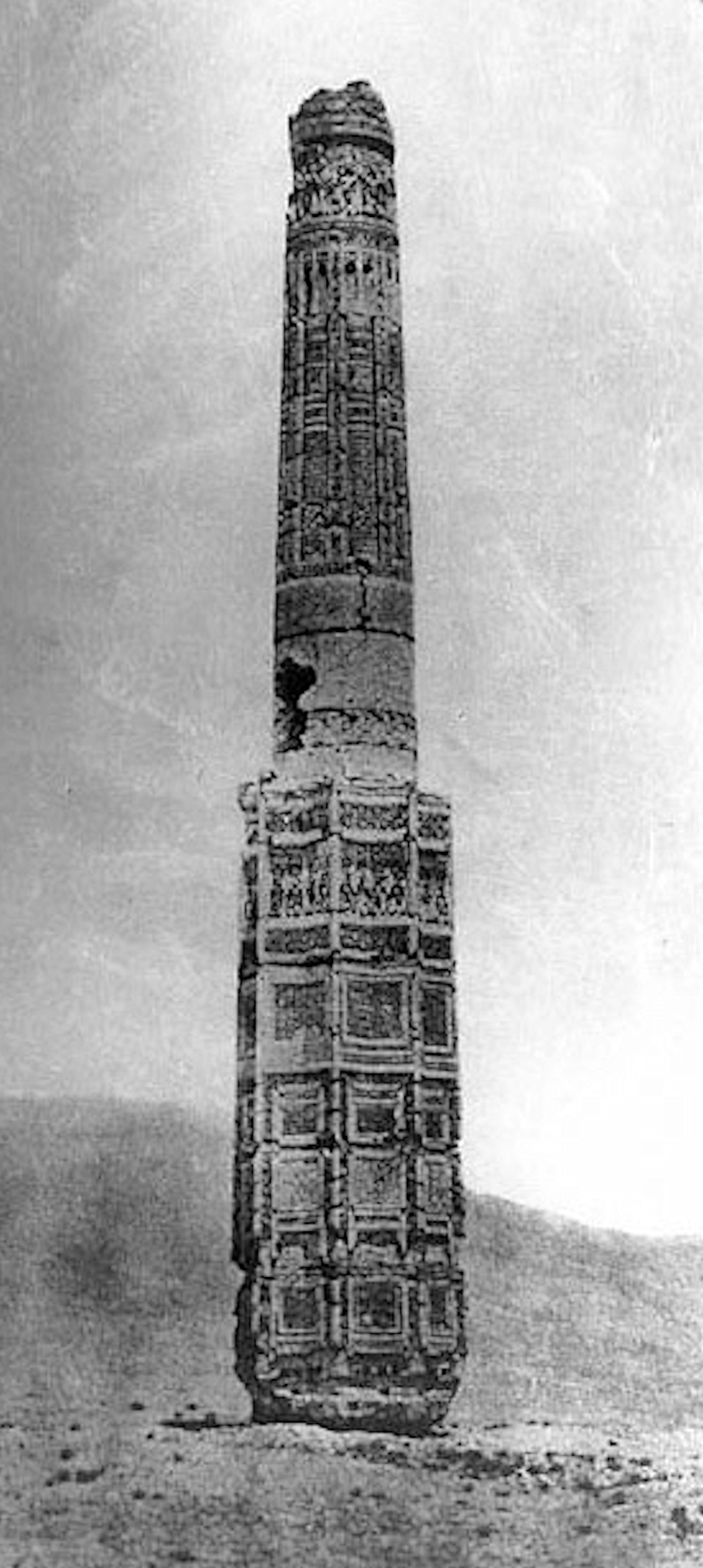
Mas'ud III's minaret, Ghazni, built between 1099 and 1115 CE. Photographed in the 19th century. The top half collapsed in an earthquake in 1902.

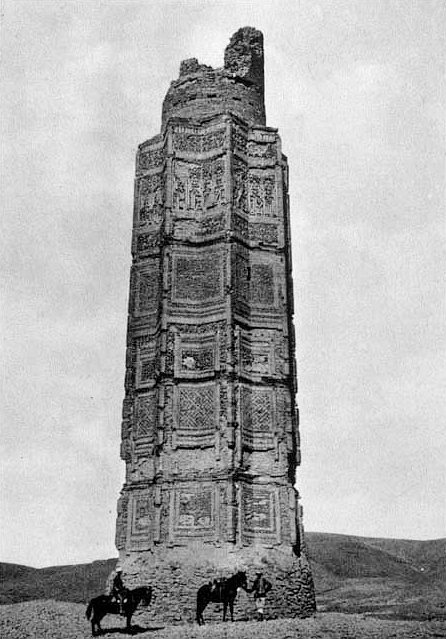
Mas'ud III's minaret, Ghazni, built between 1099 and 1115 CE. Photographed by Oscar von Niedermayer, 1916-1917

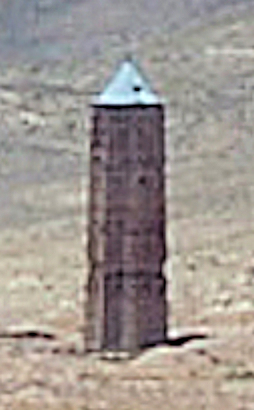
Basis of Mas'ud III's minaret, with protective roofing (2010)

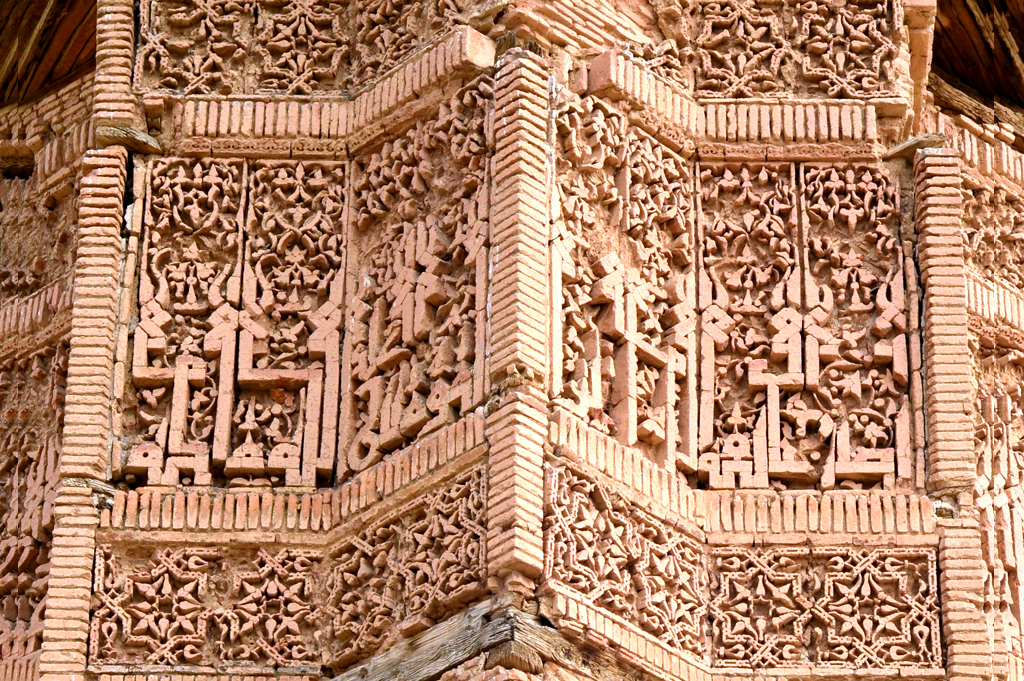
Detail of the Intricate Brickwork on the Mas'ud III Tower

=== Bahram Shah Minaret ===
Minaret of Bahram-Shah
(before and after 1902)

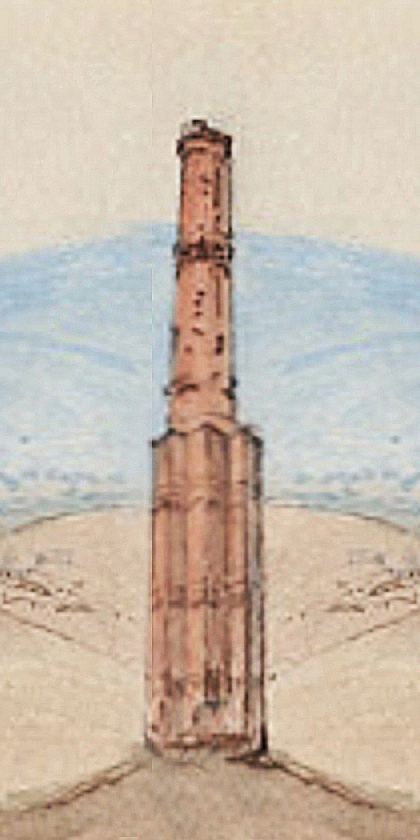
Bahram Shah minaret in 1839, with cylindrical top half.

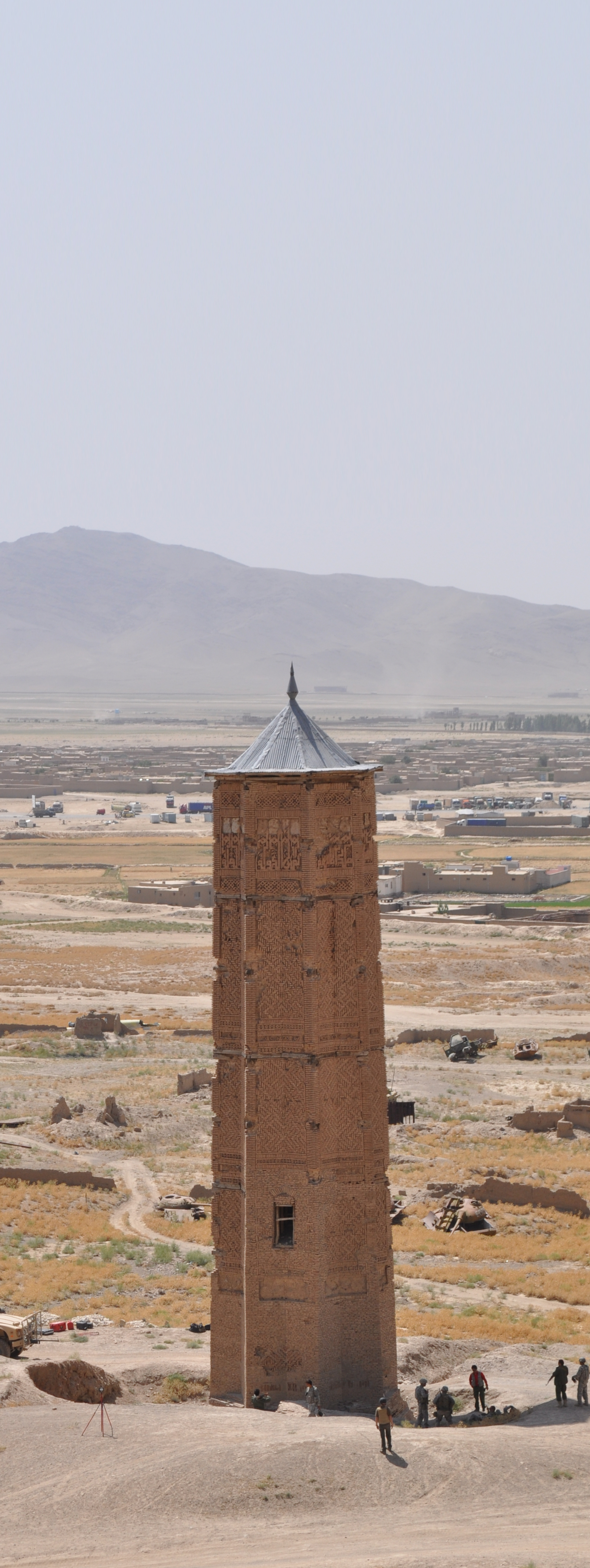
Remaining basis of Bahram Shah's minaret in Ghazni, in 2011.

The minaret, inspired by the minaret of his father Mas'ud III, used to be more than 44 meters tall until the top half crumbled following an earthquake in 1902.

Bahram Shah's minaret was inspired by the minaret of his father, Mas'ud III, and was built a few decades later, but is stylistically simpler. The minaret itself is cylindrical and stands vertically. It uses a fewer variety of techniques than his father’s minaret does and has inscribed brick bond panels that cover the majority of its surface. On these inscribed panels are terracotta inlays and upper and lower friezes of complex plaiting. There are also friezes that separate the inscribed brick bond panels on each face of the minaret. Included among these architectural designs are numerous geometric shapes with intersecting lines, medallion details, and lines of Kufic script, all of which are created through the use of relief carving techniques.

At the top of the minaret, there is a pointed roof made of tin that was placed following the toppling of the structure’s upper portion during an earthquake in 1902. As a result of the earthquake, the structure now stands at approximately 20 meters in height, but it had previously exceeded 44 meters in height.

It is not known what prompted the building of Bahram Shah’s minaret; however, given his relative lack of military and political success, it was likely built in an attempt to emulate his father or for self-glorification.

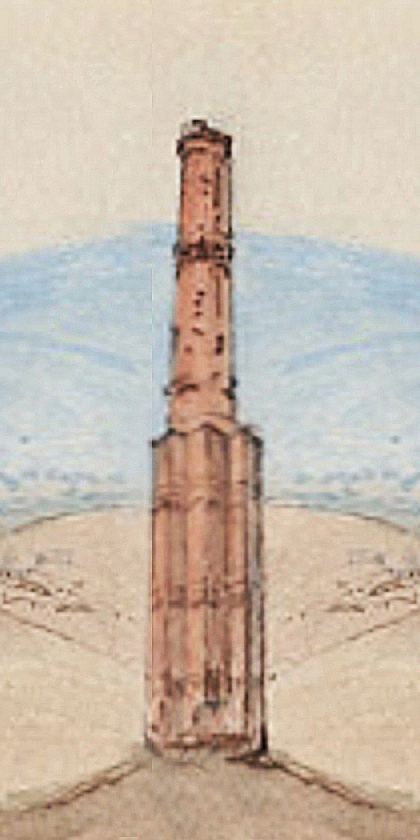
Bahram Shah minaret in 1839, with cylindrical top half (fallen in 1902).

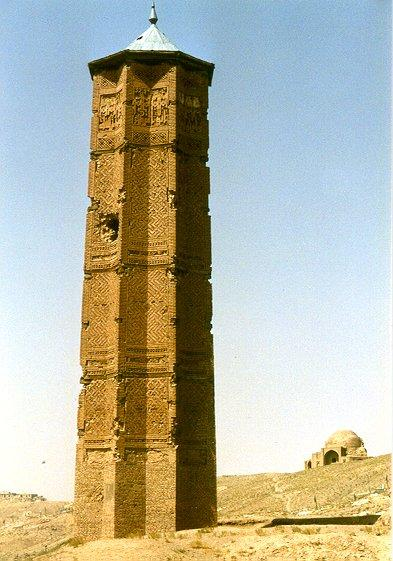
Bahram Shah's minaret as seen in 2001.

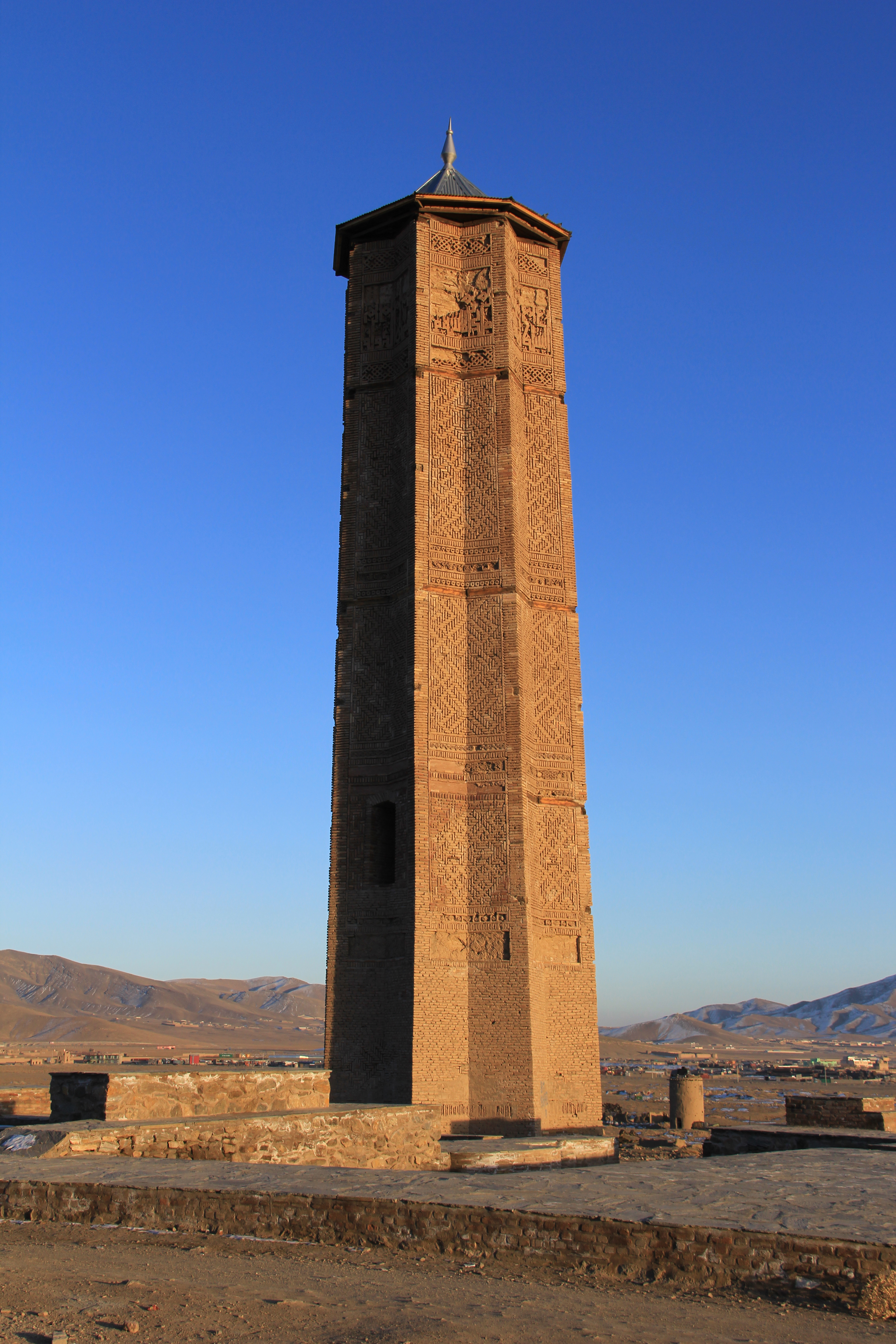
Remaining basis of Bahram Shah's minaret in Ghazni.

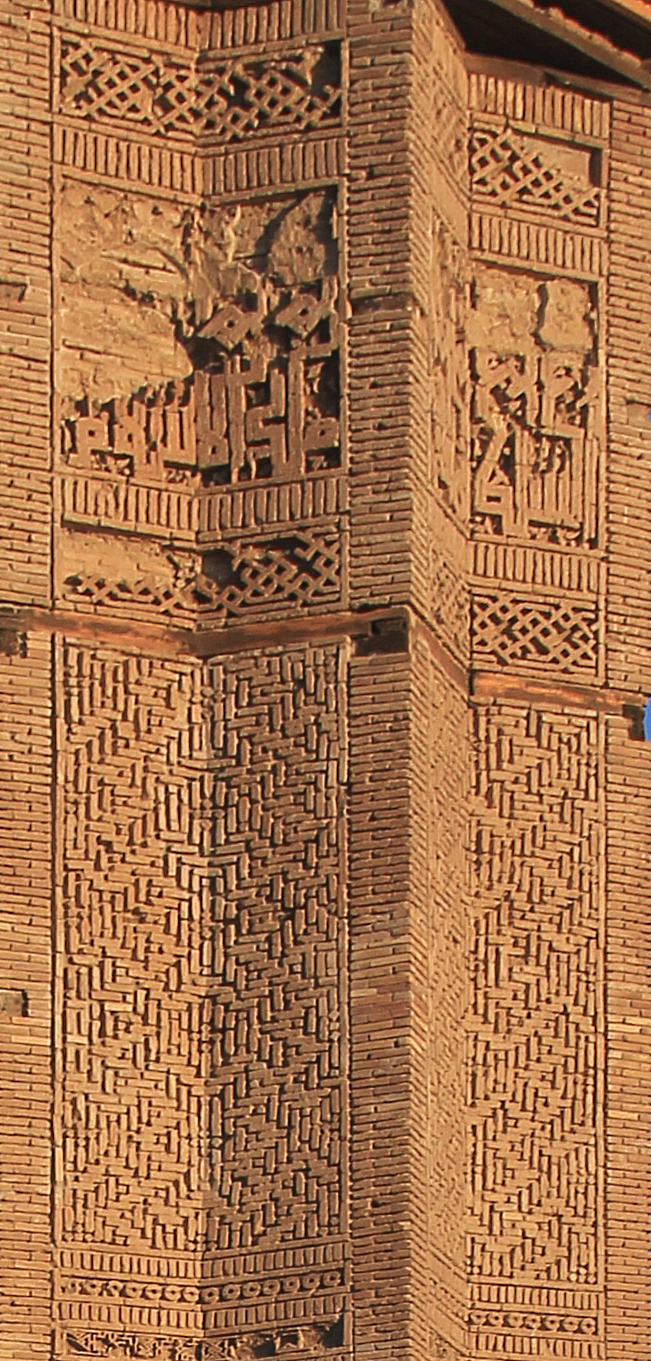
Bahram Shah Minaret (decorative detail)

== See also ==
- Minaret of Jam
- List of oldest minarets
- Citadel of Ghazni
