= Palace of Sultan Mas'ud III =

Coordinates: 33.567747°N 68.442493°E

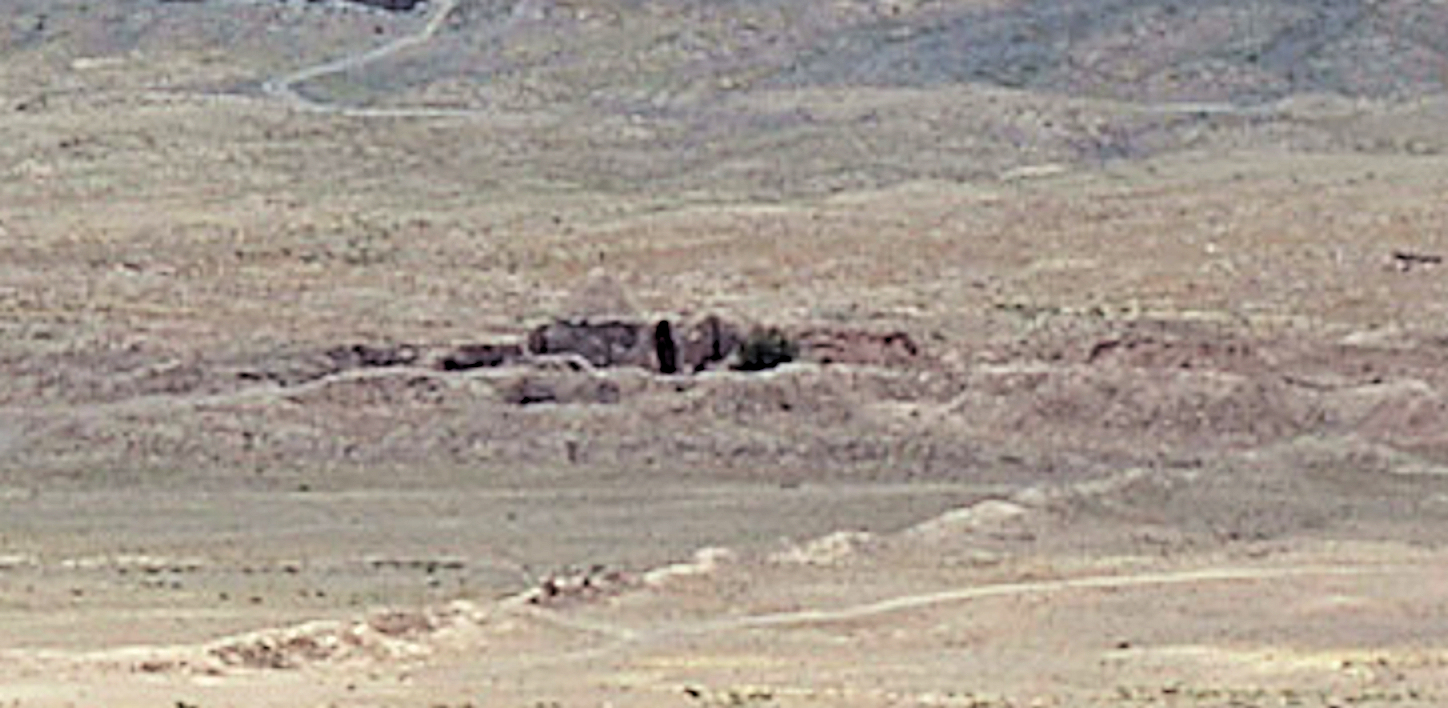
- Ruins of the Palace of Sultan Mas'ud III, northeast of Ghazni, with the behive dome of the ziyarat of Ibrahim

- Location within Afghanistan Ghazni (West and Central Asia)

General information
- Status: Ruined
- Type: Palace
- Architectural style: Persian
- Location: Ghazni, Ghazni Province, Afghanistan
- Completed: 1112

Technical details
- Material: Marble; Terracotta; Stucco

The Palace of Sultan Mas'ud III is a Ghaznavid palace in Ghazni, Afghanistan. The palace was built in 1112 by Sultan Mas'ūd III (1099-1114/5), son of Ibrahim of Ghazna. The palace is regarded as one of the most important surviving examples of Ghaznavid architecture, reflecting the dynasty’s political power during the late eleventh and early twelfth centuries. “By the end of the 10th century and beginning of the 11th century, the Ghaznavids began to display a knowledge of civil engineering in the building construction and sophisticated taste in architecture.”(Raza) The palace reflects a period of extensive architecture in Ghazni, when Ghaznavid rulers invested heavily in monumental construction to reinforce imperial authority. During this time is when Ghaznavid rulers would use many different grand pieces of architecture in their palaces,including mosques, madrasas, gardens, bridges, and fortified structures. They would use carved marble panels, stucco, and decorative inscriptions. These features distinguished Ghaznavid palace architecture from earlier regional traditions and aligned it more closely with broader Islamic architectural practices. “There was a sharp contrast to other local architecture.”(Burton-Page) The contrast to the other buildings is part of the reason why this palace is such a big part of history and why this style of architecture is so unique. This made the palace have a more Islamic architecture that would then be developed across Afghanistan and Northern India. Ghaznavid architecture had a specific look to it with all of the materials and grand additions that this palace has. This palace was not only seen as a place for royals, but also was seen as a place that showed power, culture, and symbolism through its architecture. In addition to serving as a royal residence, the palace functioned as a ceremonial and administrative space, using scale and ornaments to communicate authority and cultural prestige.There is so much history when it comes to the time period of Sultan Mus’ud III reign. One thing from his reign that is noted is the building of the victory tower. “Sultan Masʿud III and Sultan Bahram Shah erected two victory towers at Ghazni.”(Hussain)

== Description ==
Many of the archeological remains were unearthed in an Italian archeological mission in the 1960s. There is a dado with a poem in Persian and Kufic script and one in Arabic. There is a marble arch bearing the name of the sultan. The site has a small cemetery that includes the domed ziyarat of Ibrahim of Ghazna in the west side of the palace. II (northeast of Ghazni)]]

== Excavation ==
Italian archaeologists from IsMEO, Istituto Italiano per il Medio ed Estremo Oriente, excavated the palace ruins. There were two excavations that occurred, one throughout the summer and fall of 1957, and the other a year later in the summer to fall of 1958. The Italians had many excavation teams in the mid-20th century, both in Western Asian and countries in Africa; these excavation teams operated under the Italian Ministry of Foreign Affairs. Alessio Bombaci, a professor in Naples, was the leader of the first excavation. Umberto Scerrato (b.1928- d.2004), an Italian archaeologist who specialized in the Iranian and Islamic world, led the second excavation campaign due to Bombaci's absence. Scerrato was one of the foremost Italian archeologists in the Islamic and Iranian world, beginning the Islamic works portion of the University of Naples Museum in the early 1970s . Accompanying Scerrato were many students, Mr. Sadiq Khan from the Museum of Kabul, and architect, Alberto Davico. Davico possessed the architectural plans for the palace.

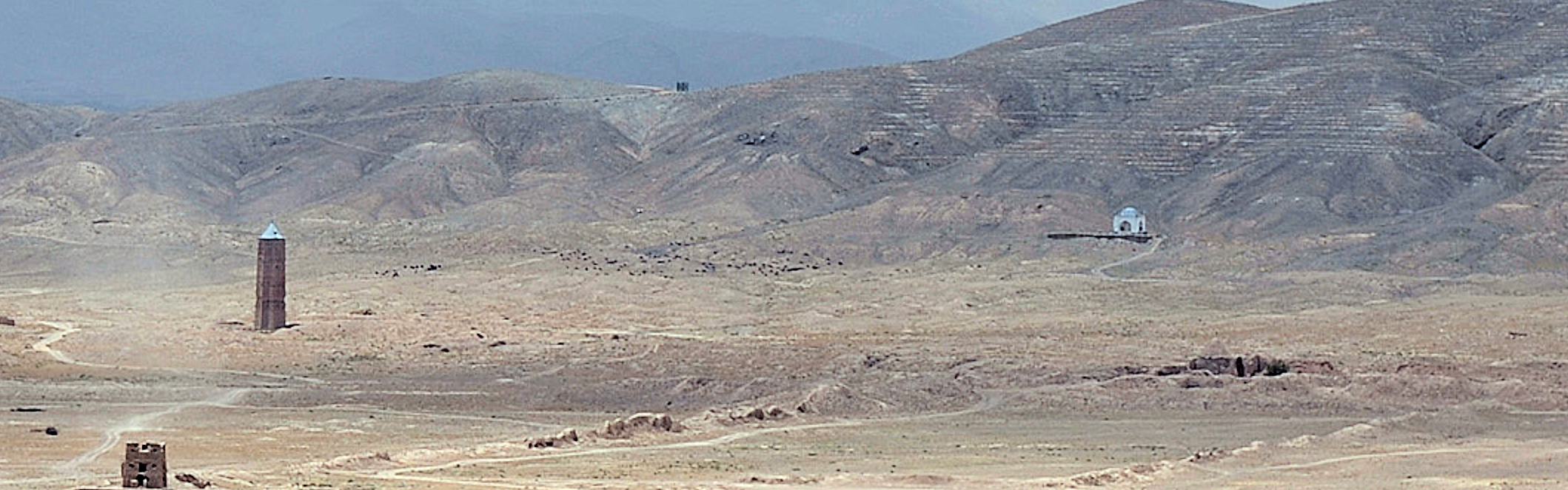
Minaret of Mas'ud III (left) and Palace (right) of Sultan Mas'ud III (northeast of Ghazni)

The site for the excavation itself was determined in 1956, and was approximately four kilometers long, stretching across the Rauza suburb. The Italians were interested in this particular location, for they knew it had once been a noble site, inhabited by rulers. The palace was said to have a central courtyard, with rooms surrounding such as a throne room, government offices, royal apartments, etc. The Italians were excavating the palace and another location known as the House of the Lustre Painted-Wares on the same campaign. The House of Lustre Painted-Wares was located on the hilly Rauza Mounts, to the east of the Minaret of Mas'ud III of Ghazni. They were two separate excavation sites, but were closely intertwined due to their proximity.

During the excavation itself, many fragments of ceramics were found, along with elements of architectural design in brick, stucco, and marble. Some fragmented items of ceramic, brick, stucco, and marble work were legally transferred from the Afghan authorities to the Italian Archeological Mission. They are now kept in a museum warehouse to be studied by archaeological students in Italy. Many fragmented pieces were said to have been preserved in the National Museum of Afghanistan, located in Kabul. The Taliban have destroyed several works that were once contained here; it in unknown if works from the palace site were part of the pieces destroyed.

Other excavated items include a door-frame, and fragments of the courtyard marble dado. There were 44 panels of the dado found in place and around 400 other fragments of the dado frieze found throughout the excavation site. Marble was a popular medium throughout this Ghaznavid city, while brick and stucco were commonly used as the main building materials of the time. The Abbasids in Baghdad were believed to inspire this interest in marble. Part of this dado panel is now housed in the Brooklyn Museum in New York. Additionally, there were many terracotta basins excavated in Hall II.

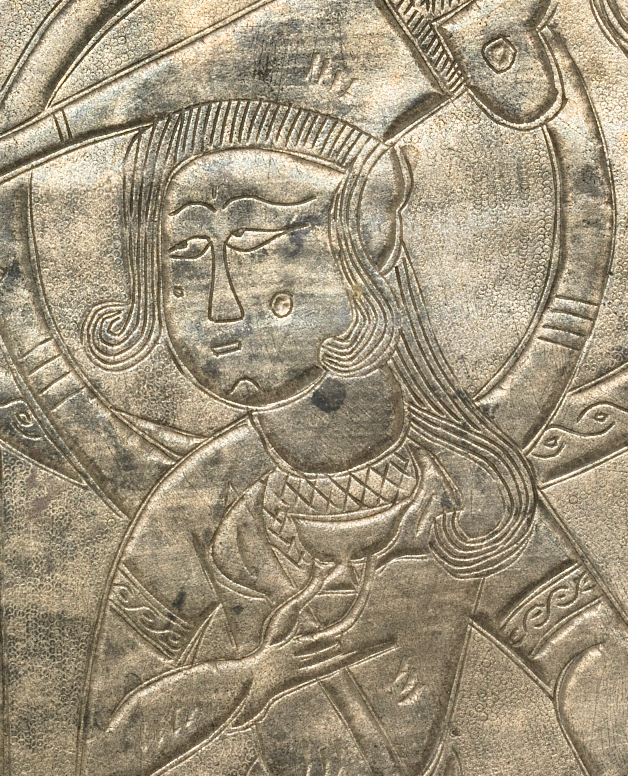
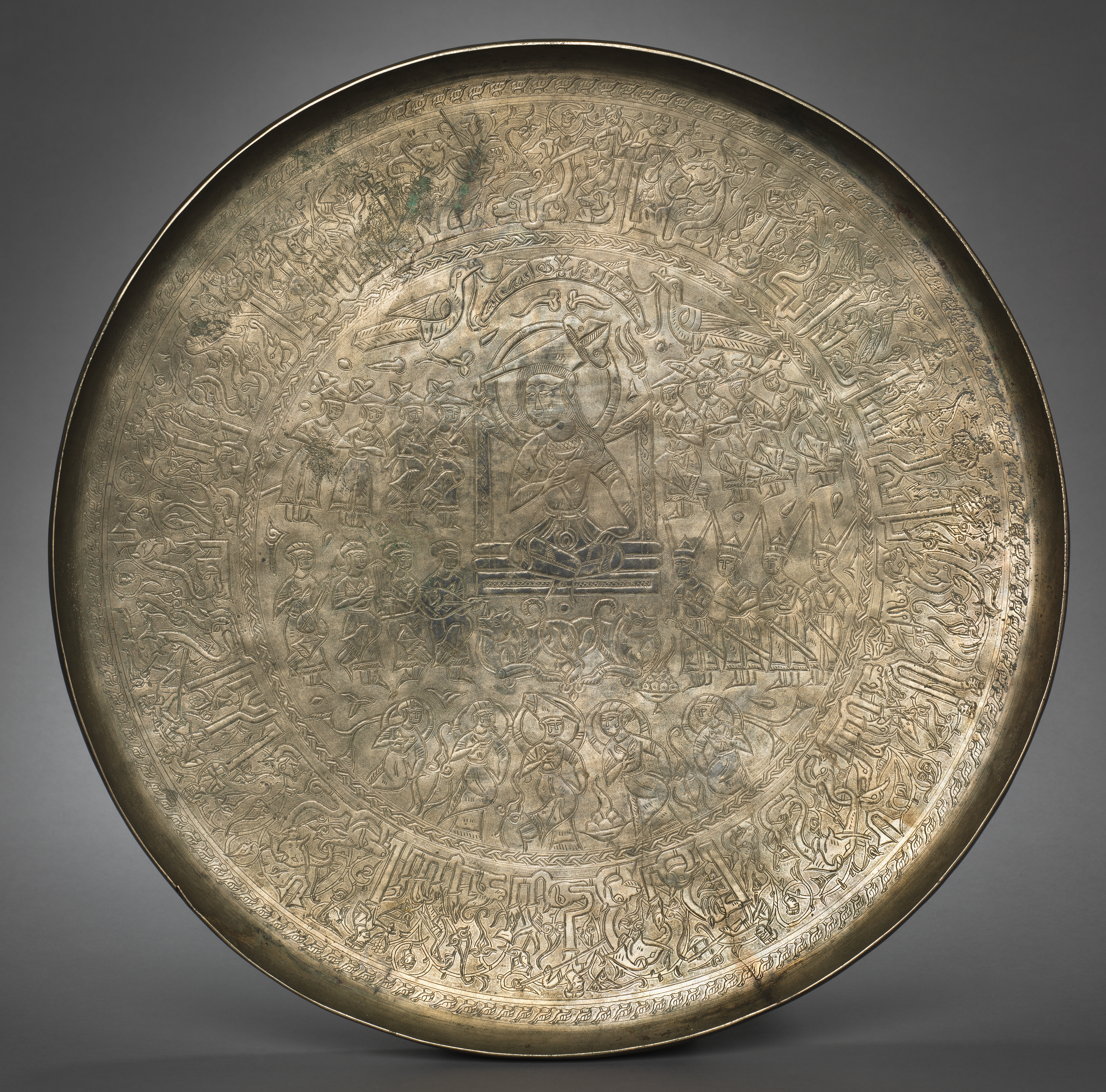
Ghaznavid Sultan and his court, on a brass salver plate. Dated circa 1100, Ghaznavid period, Afghanistan, probably Herat or Ghazni. Cleveland Museum of Art. The sultan is seated in the traditional cross-legged Turkish posture, and "the round faces and almond eyes of the figures reflect the Turkish facial type of that period".

Only a portion of the palace rooms were fully excavated, many were only partially excavated. The courtyard, numerous hallways, and the ruins of an iwan are all understood to be partially excavated. Overtime, much of the ruins have been broken down to repurpose its building materials. Harsh weather conditions, particularly heavy snowfall in the winter and rainfall in the spring, have contributed to the deterioration of the palace. Mongols were known to have looted and invaded the palace in the latter half of the 13th century, destroying much of the location. The site suffered further extensive damage and looting in both the Afghan Civil War and the Soviet Invasion. In 2005, the palace was determined completely destroyed by the SPACH (Society for the Preservation of Afghanistan's Cultural Heritage).

== Repatriations ==
The excavations led to many decorative panels of the palace being spread around Europe and North America. Some of these places include the Brooklyn Museum in New York, Asian Art Museum in San Francisco, California, and the Museum of Art and History or MK&G in Hamburg, Germany. Many of the pieces made it to auction houses where they were sold to these countries. Then in 1998, a conference called the Washington Conference on Holocaust-Era Assets was held to discuss the future of stolen works from specifically Nazi's In World War II. There, they concluded to return pieces to homelands and heirs.

Germany was one of the countries in the conference, and on October 8, 2021, they returned the panel held in the MK&G in Hamburg. The piece was originally part of a frieze from the inner courtyard. Soon after, The Asian Art Museum has agreed to return the panel they possess. The Museum in San Francisco had originally been gifted the marble panel under the assumption it was obtained legally, but these circumstances are now under question. However, the museum only agreed to physically give back the panel when Afghanistans' consulates are working in conjunction with the United States.

The Brooklyn Museum shared a similar sentiment. The museum does not want to give the panel they display back until Afghanistans' government is recognized. However, unlike the Asian Art Museum, they have also not given an indication of return. The Museum of Asian art recognizes Afghanistan as having ownership, but the Brooklyn museum holds their piece both physically and in name. This does not mean they are not open to discussion in the future of changing ownership, but with the governments' current situation, they will not return the panel.

== Palace architecture ==
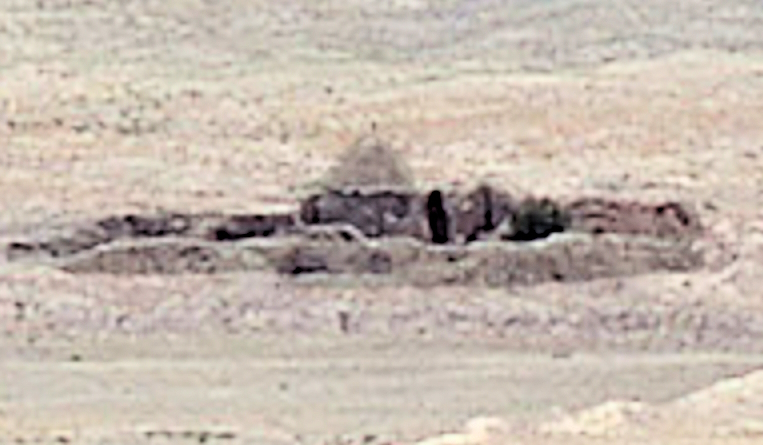
Ruins of the Masud III Palace

The palace built for Sultan Masʿud III is considered a key example of Ghaznavid architecture in eastern Iran and Afghanistan. Based on the Italian excavations from the 1950s–60s, the palace had a classic rectangular layout with a big open courtyard at the center, which was used for ceremonies and as the main route through the complex. Four vaulted halls (iwans) opened off the courtyard, connecting to suites of rooms, audience spaces, service areas, and smaller side courtyards. Even though the actual number of rooms isn’t clear, the remains suggest a large, symmetrical building around the main courtyard.

Archaeologists estimate the palace was over 100 meters on each side, about the same as other Ghaznavid structures like Lashkari Bazar. Most evidence points to it being only one story tall—there aren’t signs of stairs or upper floors—so height mainly came from vaulted spaces and iwans, which fits the style of Islamic palaces from the 11th and 12th centuries.

The palace was part of a larger walled compound, which separated it from the rest of Ghazni. These perimeter walls, gates, and entry points were designed for processions, gatherings, and court events, and are specific to the palace complex—not the whole city.

Construction mainly used baked brick and lime mortar, with large, plastered brick vaults or stucco roofs. Special areas, like doorways and column bases, were decorated with white carved marble, making a strong contrast with the stucco. Rugiadi points out that these marble pieces feature shallow carved patterns—geometric and vegetal—that link the architectural style with its ornamentation.

Decorations included carved marble, stucco, and lots of inscription bands in Kufic Arabic and Persian, which celebrated the kingship and the divine support for the Ghaznavid dynasty. Many of these decorated marble fragments were found during the Italian digs, and they help scholars imagine the original look of the palace even though most of the building is gone now.

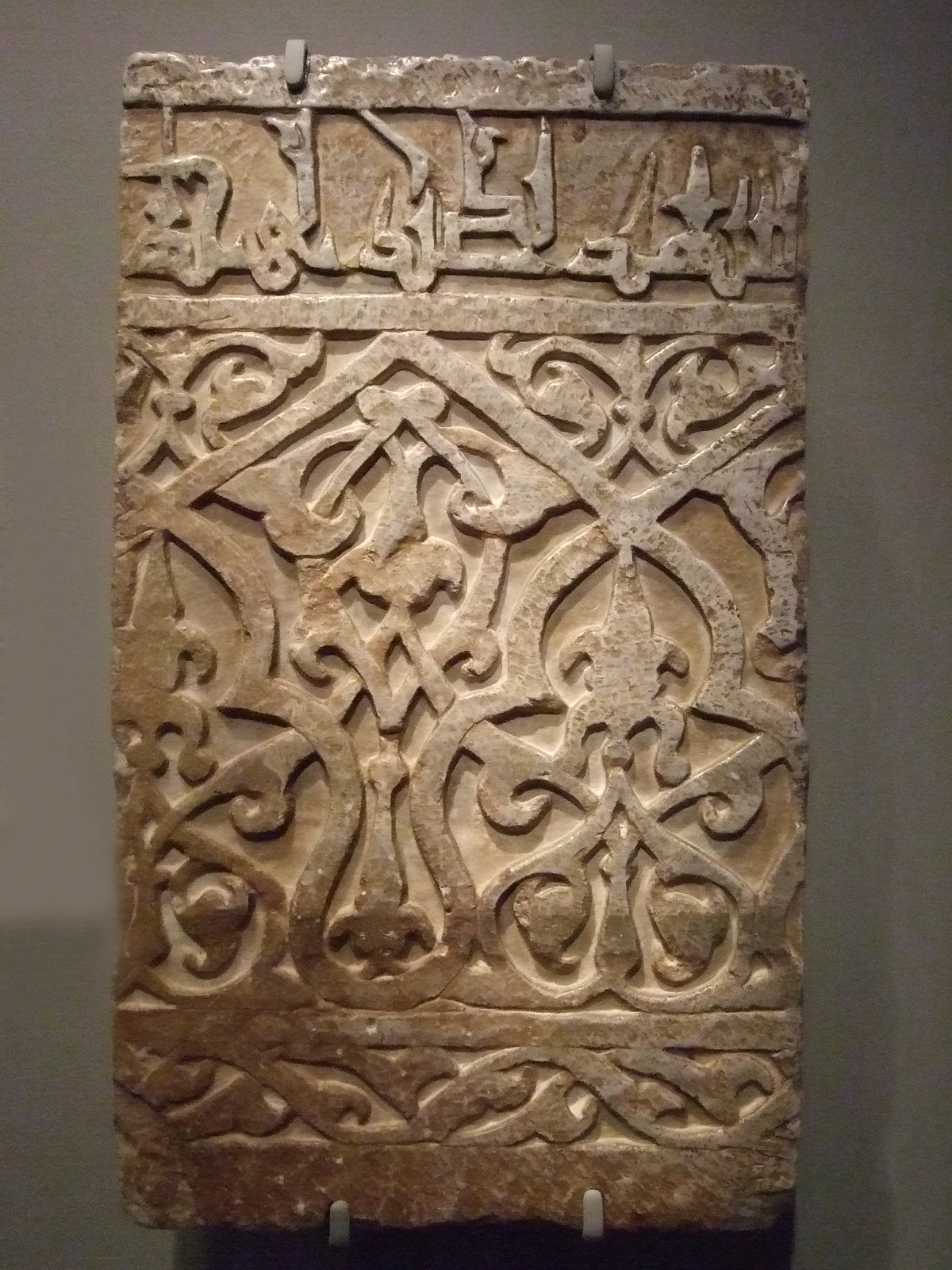
Ghaznavid panel, Palace of Masud III.

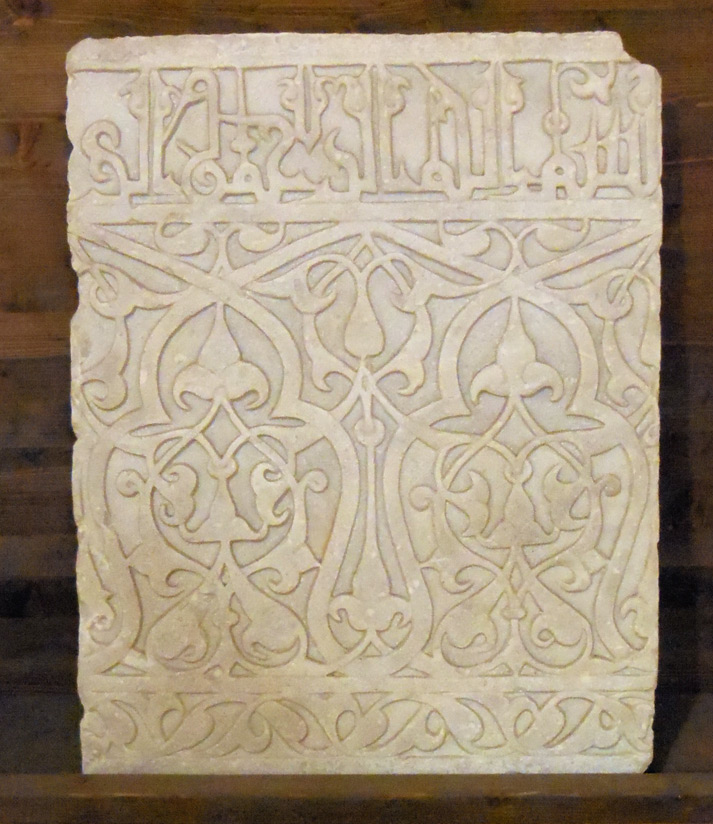
Carved relief from the Palace of Masud III

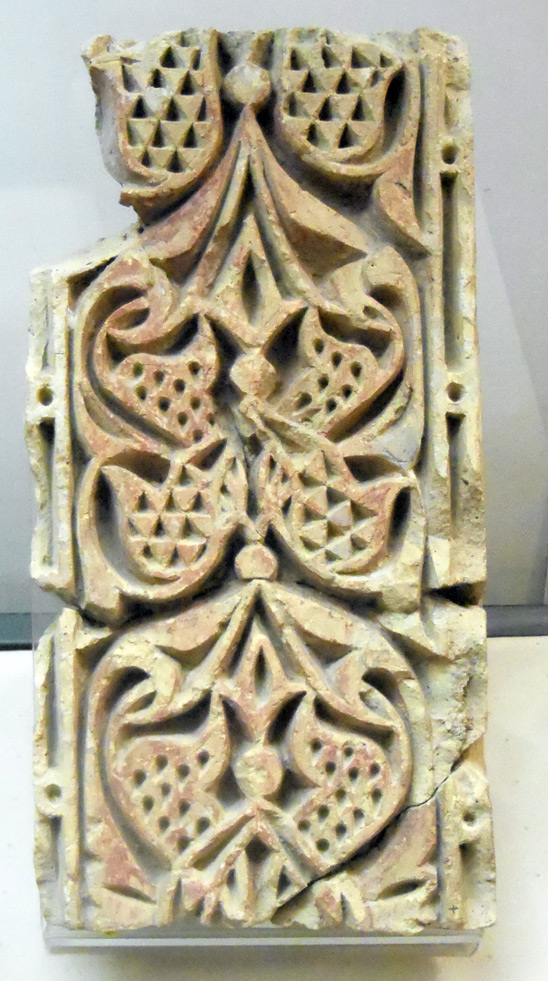
Carved relief from the Palace of Masud III

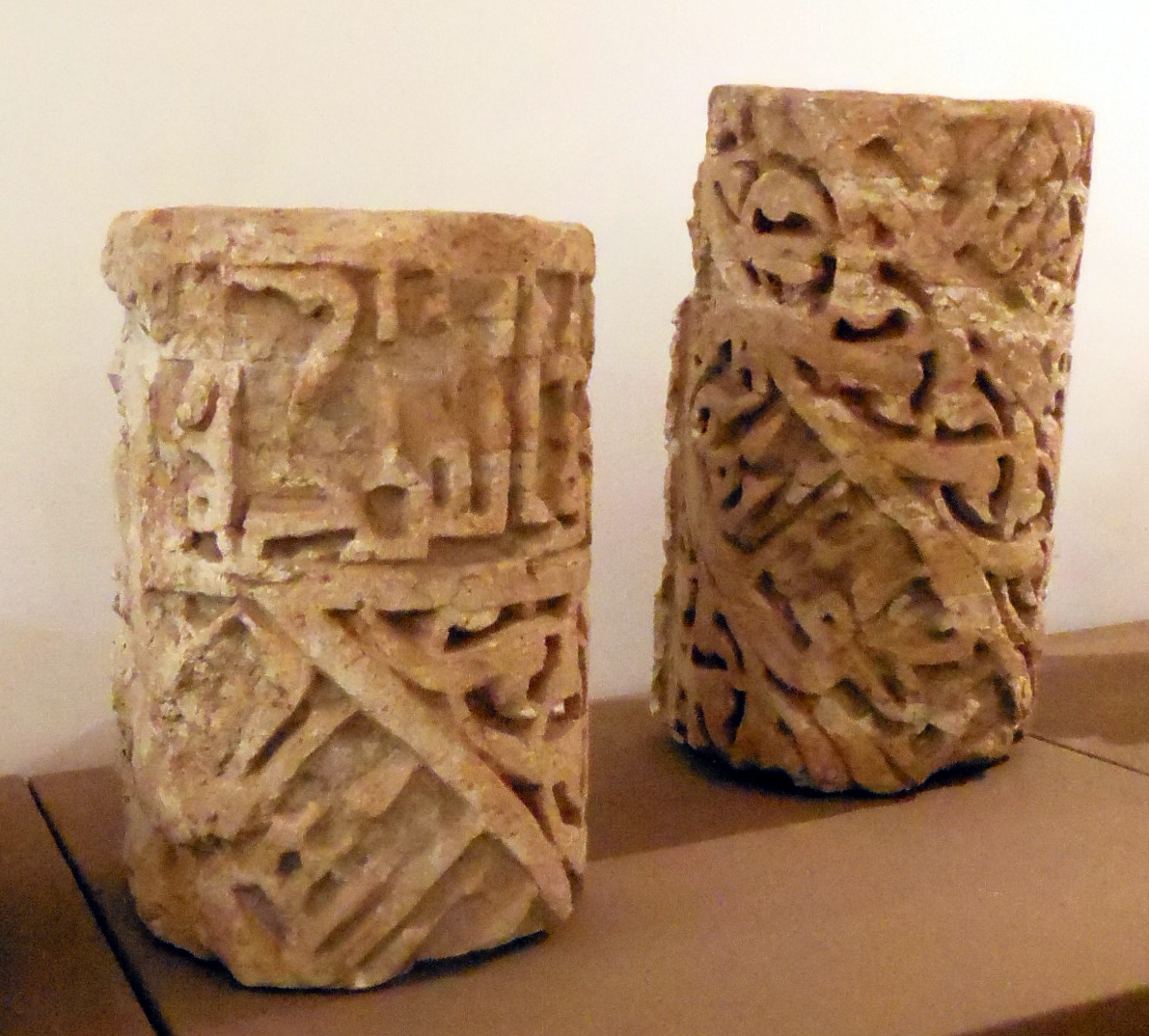
Pillar decorations
