= Bahram-Shah of Ghazna =

Ghaznavid sultan from 1117 to 1152

Bahram-Shah
- Ghaznavid Sultan; Yamin ad-Dawlah
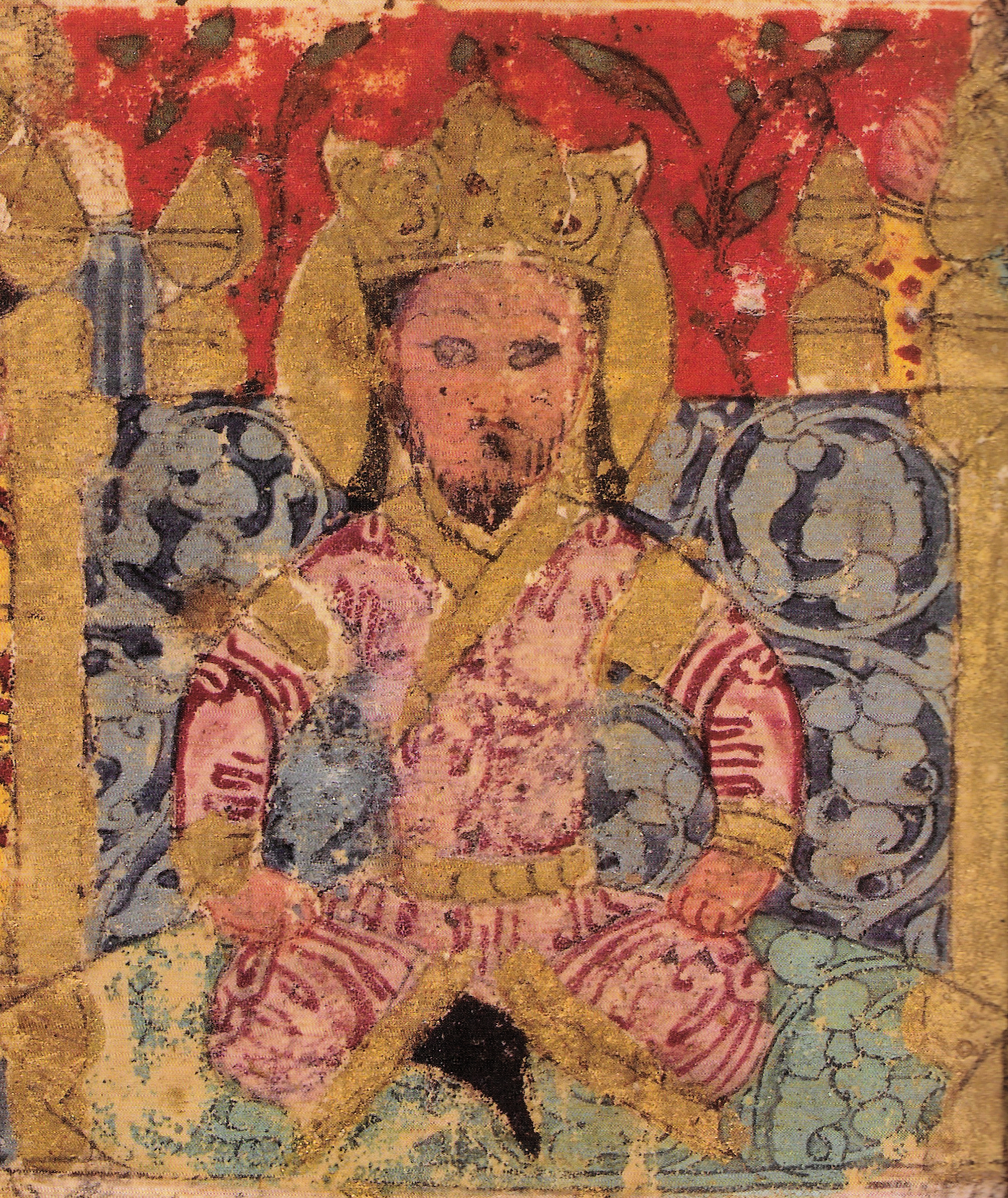
- Portrait of Ghaznavid ruler Bahrām Shāh (d. 1152), (Kalila and Dimna, folio 6a, end of 13th century, Topkapi H.363).

Sultan of Ghaznavid Empire
- Reign: 25 February 1117 – 1152
- Predecessor: Arslan-Shah
- Successor: Khusrau-Shah
- Born: c. 1084; Ghaznavid Empire
- Died: c. 1152 (aged 67–68); Ghaznavid Empire
- Issue: Muizz ad-Dawlah Khusrau-Shah
Names
- Laqab: Yamin ad-Dawlah wa Amin al-Milla; Kunya: Abul-Muzaffar; Given name: Bahram-Shah; Nasab: Bahram-Shah ibn Mas'ud ibn Ibrahim ibn Mas'ud ibn Mahmud ibn Sabuktegin
- House: Ghaznavid Dynasty
- Father: Mas'ud III of Ghazni
- Mother: Gawhar Khatun
- Religion: Sunni Islam

Bahram-Shah (full name:Yamin ad-Dawlah wa Amin al-Milla Abul-Muzaffar Bahram-Shah) (1084 – 1157) was Sultan of the Ghaznavid Empire from 25 February 1117 to 1152. Son of Mas'ud III and Gawhar Khatun, sister of Sanjar, sultan of the Great Seljuq Empire. During his entire reign, his empire was a tributary of the Great Seljuq Empire.

== Removes Arslan Shah ==
Following the murder of Sultan Shirzad by Arslan Shah in 1116 and the latter's usurpation of the Ghaznavid throne, Bahram marched an army from Zamin-Dawar to assert his claim to the throne. Arslan and Bahram's forces met at Tiginabad, whereupon Bahram was defeated and fled to the Seljuk court in Khurasan. Gaining support from Sanjar, sultan of the Great Seljuq Empire, Bahram returned with a Seljuq army and defeated Arslan Shah's army at the Battle of Ghazni. A decisive battle occurred just outside Ghazna on the plain of Shahrabad, again resulting in Arslan's defeat and he fled to the Ghaznavid territories in northern India. Bahram entered Ghazna, in the company of Sanjar, and was formally installed as sultan in 1117, but as a vassal of the Great Seljuq Empire. Bahram saw Ghazna, his capital, subjected to 40 days of occupation and ransacking by the Seljuq army. After Sanjar's departure, Arslan Shah advanced towards Ghazna and Bahram fled from the capital city to the fortress of Bamian. At Bahram's request, Sanjar sent another army to retake Ghazna. Arslan fled into the Ughnan mountains but was captured by the commander of Sanjar's army and was strangled on Bahram's orders.

== Bahram's reign ==
Bahram's court was accompanied by a Seljuq amil or tax collector and the sending of his eldest son, Daulat Shah, to the Seljuq court at Merv as a hostage. It is believed that Bahram raided India once, attacking Sapadalaksha or eastern Rajputana.

Faced with a rebellious faction led by Muhammad b. 'Ali, Bahram marched an army to Multan in 1119. Bahram asked for Muhammad's obedience but was refused. The ensuing battle in western Punjab resulted in Muhammad's death and the deaths of most of his sons. Bahram appointed Salar Husain b. Ibrahim 'Alawi as his governor in India.

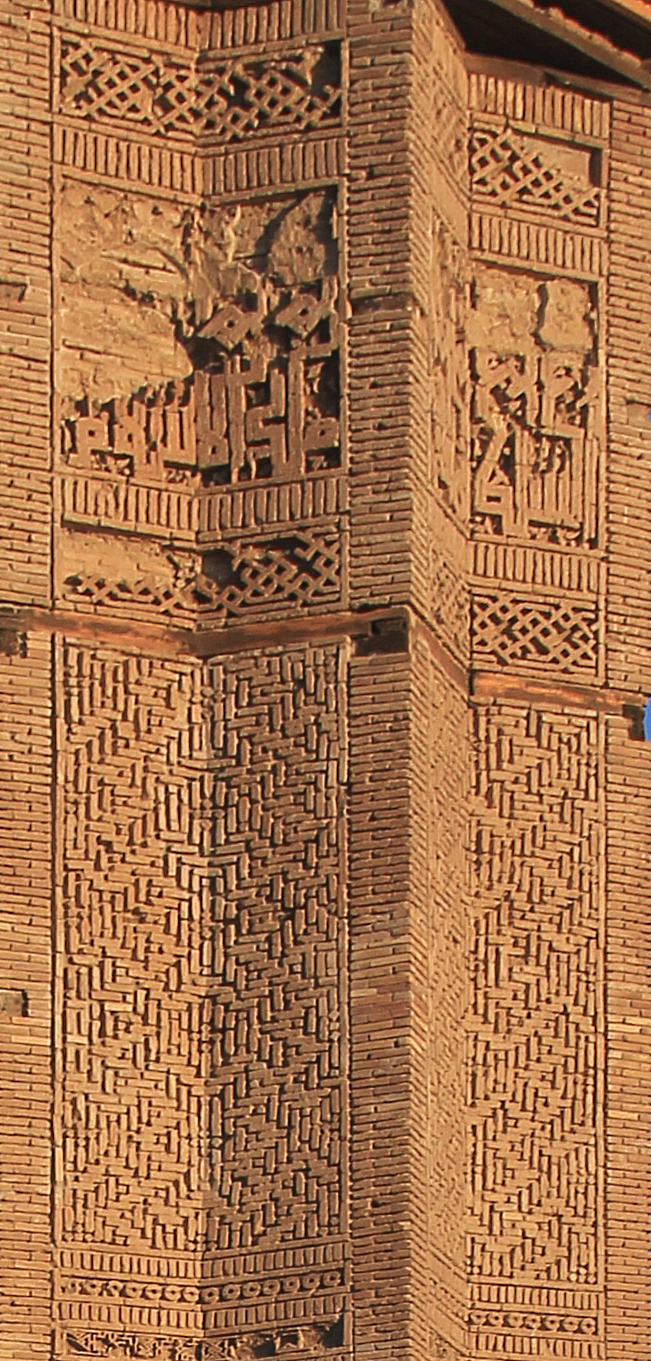
Bahram Shah Minaret decorative detail.

In 1135, Bahram stopped paying tribute to Ahmed Sanjar. In response, Sanjar marched an army to Ghazna, and Bahram, seeing the size of Sanjar's army, fled to Lahore the second Ghaznavid capital. After sending diplomatic entreaties, Bahram was assured of his throne, his position as a tributary of the Seljuq empire and returned to Ghazna. Between 1143 and 1146, Bahram commissioned Abu'l-Ma'ali Nasrallah to translate the Indian fable story Kalila wa Dimna from Arabic to Persian.

In an attempt to strengthen his hold over the Ghurids, Bahram invited Qutb ad-Din Muhammad b. Husain, his son in law, to court. Believing that Qutb and his brother Sayf al-Din Suri had come to court to scout the city for a future raid, Bahram had Qutb poisoned, though Sayf al-Din Suri escaped. By 1148, Sayf al-Din Suri returned with an army, scored a victory at the Battle of Ghazni while Bahram fled to Kurram. Building an army, Bahram marched back to Ghazna. Sayf al-Din Suri fled, but the Ghaznavid army caught up with him and a battle ensued at Sang-i Surakh. Sayf al-Din Suri and Majd ad-Din Musawi were captured and later crucified at Pul-i Yak Taq.

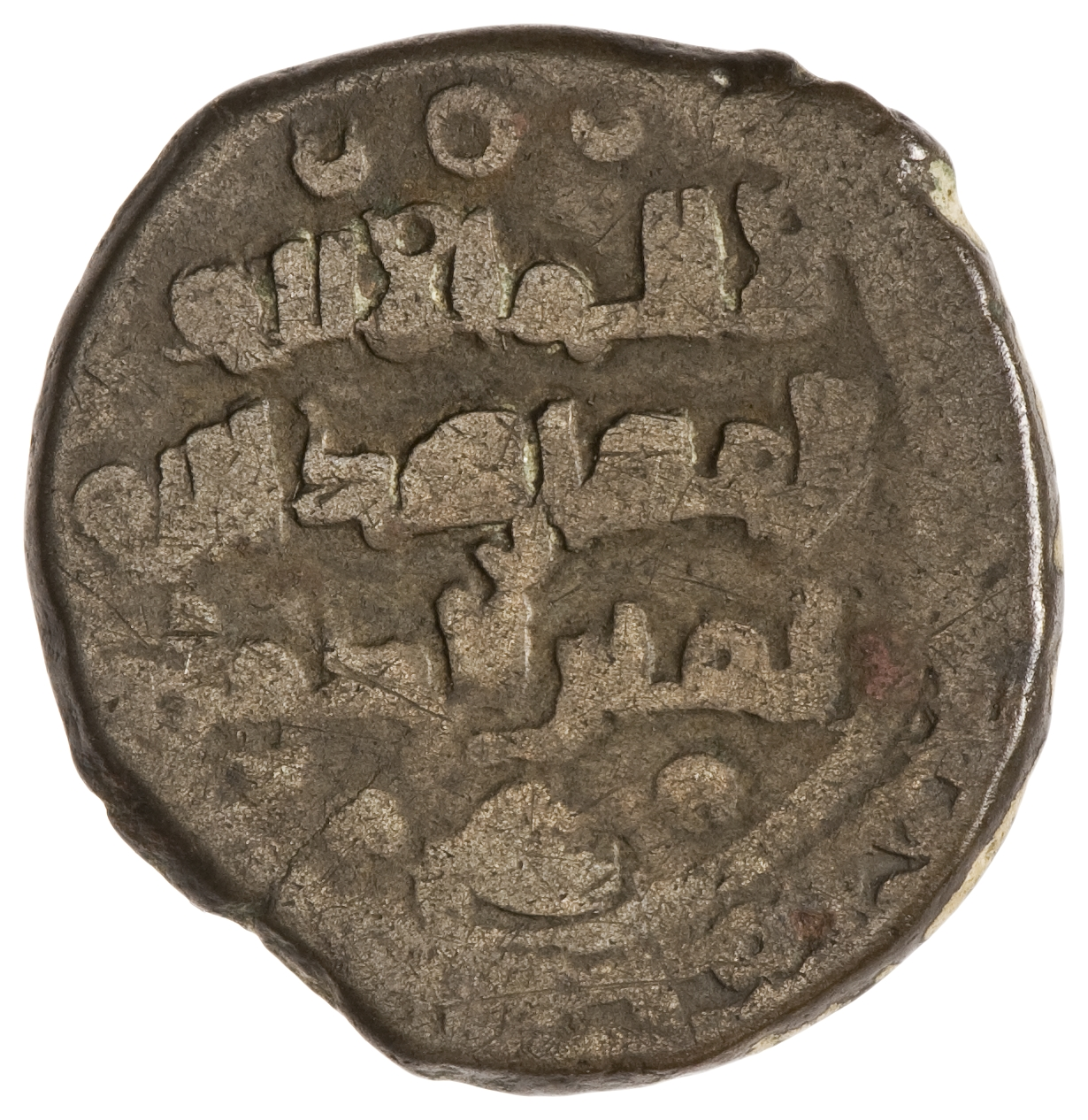
Coin of Bahram-Shah, Kabul mint

In response, Ala al-Din Husayn, younger brother of Sayf al-Din Suri and chief of the Ghurids, launched a campaign against Bahram in 1150. The Ghaznavid and Ghurid armies met at Tiginabad and through the heroic efforts of Kharmil Sam-i Husain and Kharmil Sam-i Banji the Ghaznavid army was routed. Bahram rallied elements of his army at the hot springs, Jush-i Ab-i Garm, but was again routed and fled back to Ghazna. Bahram again rallied the remaining elements of his army with the addition of the city's garrison, but again his army was routed and the city was burned by the Ghurids. Following this defeat, Bahram fled to the Ghaznavid territories in India. Ghazna was then subjected to seven days of pillage and rapine, in which 60,000 of the city were killed. All the tombs of the Ghaznavid rulers, with the exception of Mahmud, Mas'ud and Ibrahim, were broken open and the remains burned. From these events, Ala al-Din Husayn gained the nickname, World-Incendiary(i.e. World Burner).

Bahram stayed in northern India for over a year, rebuilding his army. After the defeat and capture of Ala al-Din Husayn at Herat by Seljuq forces, Bahram returned to Ghazna and removed the Ghurid governor. Bahram spent his remaining days in Ghazna, died in 1157 and was succeeded by his son, Khusrau Shah.

== Raids on Indian kingdoms ==
Minaret of Bahram-Shah
(before and after 1902)

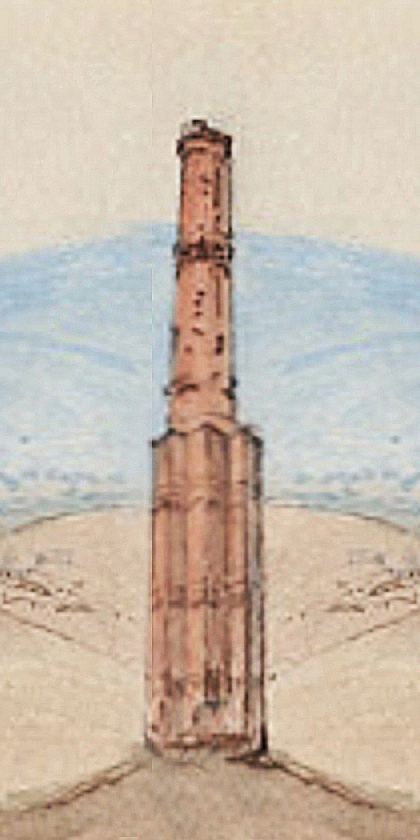
Bahram Shah minaret in 1839, with cylindrical top half.

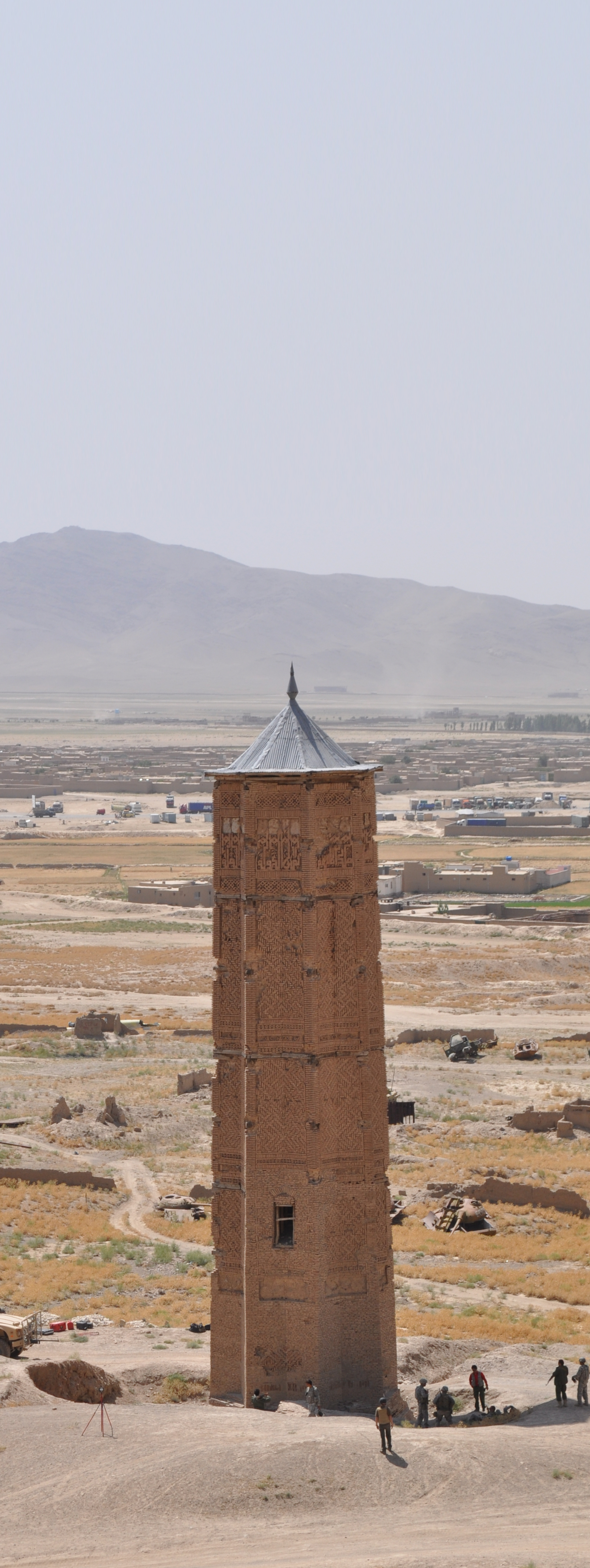
Remaining basis of Bahram Shah's minaret in Ghazni, in 2011.

The Ghazni minaret of Bahram-Shah, inspired by the minaret of his father Mas'ud III, used to be more than 44 meters tall until the top half crumbled following an earthquake in 1902.

Bahram Shah is said to have conducted two "holy wars" in India. The 13th-century historian Minhaj-i-Siraj states that Bahram Shah made several expeditions to India but was defeated.

According to Mihaj's Tabaqat-i Nasiri and Firishta's Tarikh-i-Firishta, Muhammad Bahlim or Bahalim (Bahram Shah's governor in India) had captured the Nagaur fort. After Bahlim died, Salar Hussain succeeded him as the governor of Ghaznavid territories in India. Nagaur was under the control of the Chahamana king Ajayaraja at least until 1121 CE, as attested by Prabhavaka Charita (the text calls him Alhadana, which appears to be a Sanskritized form of his alias Alhana). This suggests that Bahram Shah's forces captured Nagaur from Ajayaraja. The Prithviraja Vijaya states that Ajayaraja defeated the Garjana Matangas ("Ghazna Muslims"). This is probably a reference to Ajayaraja's repulsion of a raid by either Bahlim or Salar Hussain. The Prabandha Kosha also claims that Ajayaraja defeated "Sahavadina" (Sanskritized form of Shahab-ud-Din). This probably refers to his repulsion of invasions by Ghaznavid generals as well.

Ajayaraja's son Arnoraja also seems to have repulsed some Ghaznavid raids. According to his Ajmer prashasti inscription, Arnoraja adorned Ajmer with the blood of Turushkas (Turkic people). The Prithviraja Vijaya also states that Arnoraja repulsed a Muslim invasion. According to the text, these invaders came through the desert, and had to drink the blood of their horses in absence of water. After defeating these invaders, Arnoraja purified the place of their death by commissioning a lake, which is identified with the modern Ana Sagar. The lake was filled with the water of the Chandra river, identified with the modern Bandi River. Historian H. C. Ray theorized that the Muslim invaders defeated by Arnoraja were the Ghaznavid (Yamini) generals of Lahore. However, historian R. B. Singh identifies the invader as Bahram Shah himself. The Tabaqat-i Nasiri states that Bahlim revolted against his master Bahram Shah, who marched towards India to defeat the rebel. Bahlim also set out from Nagaur with his army, and the two armies met at Multan, where Bahlim was defeated and killed. Bahram Shah then left for Ghazna to fight the Ghurids. R. B. Singh speculates that after revolting against Bahram Shah, Bahlim sought asylum with the Chahamanas, and Arnoraja granted him the fief of Nagaur. After defeating Bahalim, Bahram Shah may have attempted to subdue Arnoraja, but was defeated. The Muslim chronicles probably omitted this event to avoid recording Bahram Shah's defeat.

== Fall of the Ghaznavids ==
According to Bertold Spuler, a German Orientalist, Bahram's treachery, personal cowardice and desertion of his subjects directly contributed to the disintegration of the Ghaznavid Empire.

Bahram-Shah of Ghazna House of Sabuktegin Born: 1084 Died: 1157
Regnal titles
Preceded by Arslan-Shah	Sultan of the Ghaznavid Empire; 1117-1157	Succeeded by Khusrau Shah
