= Gawhar Khatun =

Seljuk princess and wife of Ghaznavid ruler Mas'ud III

Consort of Ghaznavid Sultan
- Tenure: 1080s – 1115
- Born: Isfahan, Seljuk Sultanate
- Died: Ghaznavid Sultanate
- Spouse: Mas'ud III
- Children: Arslan-Shah; Bahram-Shah
Names
- Gawhar Khatun Malik-Shah
Era name and dates
- Islamic Golden Age: 12th Century
- Dynasty: Seljuk
- Father: Malik-Shah I
- Mother: Zubayda Khatun
- Religion: Sunni Islam

Gawhar Khatun (Persian: گوهر خاتون, also spelled Gowhar, Govhar, Gevher, Cevher, Jauhar, and Jawhar), known in other sources as Mahd-i Iraq (“the bride from Iraq”), was a Seljuq princess who during an unknown date married the Ghaznavid Sultan Mas'ud III of Ghazni (r. 1099–1115), thus becoming his second wife.

== Biography ==
Gawhar was the daughter of Sultan Malik-Shah I and his consort Zubayda Khatun, and lived in Persian Iraq, until she was in 1073 betrothed to Mas'ud III, and married the latter. Before, Mas'ud was married with a Malik Shah's sister. According to some sources, Gawhar was the mother of Mas'ud III's son Arslan-Shah, while some other sources states that she was his stepmother. Nevertheless, during Arslan-Shah's reign, Gawhar was treated badly, which resulted in her brother Ahmad Sanjar to invade Arslan-Shah's domains, where he managed to decisively defeat Arslan-Shah and make the latter's brother Bahram-Shah the new ruler of the Ghaznavid dynasty, while at the same time acknowledging Seljuq suzerainty. After this event, Gawhar is no longer mentioned in any source, and later died during an unknown date in the 12th-century.

== Sources ==
- Bosworth, C. Edmund (2002). "GOWHAR ḴĀTUN". Encyclopaedia Iranica, Vol. XI, Fasc. 2. London et al.: C. Edmund Bosworth. p. 179.
- Bosworth, C. E (1995). The Later Ghaznavids: Splendour and Decay: The Dynasty in Afghanistan and Northern India 1040-1186. ISBN 9788121505772.
- Bosworth, C. E. (1968). "The Political and Dynastic History of the Iranian World (A.D. 1000–1217)". In Frye, R. N. (ed.). The Cambridge History of Iran, Volume 5: The Saljuq and Mongol periods. Cambridge: Cambridge University Press. pp. 1–202. ISBN 0-521-06936-X.
