= Battle of Ghazni (1117) =

Battle

Date	1117
Location	Ghazni, Afghanistan
Result	Seljuk victory

Belligerents
Great Seljuq Empire	Ghaznavids

Commanders and leaders
Ahmad Sanjar	Arslan-Shah

The Battle of Ghazni was fought in 1117 between the Seljuk forces supporting the claim of Bahram of Ghazna and the army of his brother the ruling Sultan Arslan-Shah of Ghazna.

== Background ==
The death of Mas'ud III of Ghazni in 1115 began a heated contest for the throne. Shirzad took the throne that year but the next year he was assassinated by his younger brother Arslan. Arslan had to face the rebellion of his other brother, Bahram, who received support from the Seljuk Sultan Ahmad Sanjar.

== Battle ==
Ahmad Sanjar invading from Khorasan took his army into Afghanistan and inflicted a crushing defeat to Arslan near Ghazni at Shahrabad. Arslan managed to escape and Bahram succeeded to the throne as the Seljuk's vassal.
