= Shir-Zad of Ghazna =

Ghaznavid sultan from 1115 to 1116

Shir-Zad شیرزاد
- Adud al-Dawla

Sultan of the Ghaznavid Empire
- Reign: March 1115 – February 1116
- Predecessor: Mas'ud III
- Successor: Arslan-Shah
- Born: Unknown; Ghaznavid Empire
- Died: c. 1116; Ghaznavid Empire
Names
- Shir-Zad bin Mas'ūd
- Dynasty: Ghaznavid
- Father: Mas'ud III
- Religion: Sunni Islam

Adud al-Dawla Shir-Zad (Persian: عضدالدوله شیرزاد), better known as Shir-Zad (شیرزاد) was the sultan of the Ghaznavid Empire from 1115 to 1116. A son of Mas'ud III (r. 1099–1115), Shir-Zad served as a governor in India during his father's reign. The deputy governor of Shir-Zad was Qiwam al-Mulk Nizam al-Din. During his governorship, Shir-Zad became very close friends with the Persian poet Masud Sa'd Salman, who had recently been released from his imprisonment at Nay. In one of his poems, Masud Sa'd Salman makes mention of a certain Amir Kaykavus at Shir-Zad's court in the city of Lahore, which may have been the Ziyarid ruler and author of the Qabus-Nama, Kaykavus.

It was probably at his accession that Shir-Zad adopted the laqab (honorific epithet) of Kamal al-Daula. He ruled for one year, until he was overthrown by his brother Arslan-Shah in February 1116. Shir-Zad fled to the Caspian lands, where he received shelter by the ispahbad (ruler) of the local Bavand dynasty of Tabaristan. With the help of the ispahbad, Shir-Zad made a pilgrimage to Mecca in April–May. After his return, Shir-Zad attempted to regain the throne from his brother, but was killed by the latter.

No coins of Shir-Zad are known, which implies he did not rule long enough to have them minted, or none minted by him have been found yet.

== Sources ==
- Bosworth, C. E. (1977). The Later Ghaznavids: Splendour and Decay : the Dynasty in Afghanistan and Northern India, 1040-1186. Columbia University Press. ISBN 978-0-231-04428-8.
- de Bruijn, J.T.P. (2000). "Kaykāvus b. Eskandar". Encyclopædia Iranica, online edition. New York.

Preceded by Mas'ud III	Sultan of the Ghaznavid Empire; March 1115 – February 1116	Succeeded by Arslan-Shah
