= Arslan-Shah of Ghazna =

Sultan of the Ghaznavid Empire from 1116 to 1117

Arslan-Shah
- Sultan ad-Dawlah

Sultan of the Ghaznavid Sultanate
- Reign: February 1116 – 25 February 1117
- Predecessor: Shir-Zad
- Successor: Bahram Shah
- Born: c. 1092; Ghaznavid Empire
- Died: c. 1119 (aged 27); Ghaznavid Empire
- Laqab: Sultan ad-Dawlah; Kunya: Abul-Moluk; Given name: Arslan-Shah; Full name: Sultan ad-Dawlah Abul-Moluk Arslan-Shah ibn Mas'ud
- Dynasty: Ghaznavid
- Father: Mas'ud III of Ghazni
- Mother: Gawhar Khatun
- Religion: Sunni Islam

Arslan-Shah of Ghazna (full name: Sultan ad-Dawlah Abul-Moluk Arslan-Shah ibn Mas'ud) (c. 1092 – 1119) was the Sultan of the Ghaznavid Empire from 1116 to 1117.

== Biography ==
In 1116, Arslan Shah overthrew his older brother Shir-Zad, took the Ghaznavid throne, and blinded or imprisoned his remaining brothers, except Bahram who was in Zamindawar. Arslan-Shah also appointed Abu'l-Fath Yusuf as his vizier. After being initially defeated by Arslan at Tiginabad, Bahram, appealed to Seljuk Sultan Ahmad Sanjar, whose sister, Gawhar Khatun, was greatly offended at the conduct of her eldest son Arslan ibn Mas'ud, towards the rest. Incited by her and perhaps by his own ambitious views Sanjar called on Arslan to release his brothers and on his refusal marched against him with an army of 30,000 cavalry and 50,000 infantry.

Arslan was defeated after an obstinate engagement and fled to Ghazna. There, on the plain outside Ghazna, Arslan was decisively defeated and fled to India, where he was supported by the Bu Halim Shaybani family. Ghazna was then subjected to forty days of pillage, which culminated in Bahram's installment as ruler and vassal of Sanjar. However, as soon as Sanjar had withdrawn his army, Arslan returned, and chased out Bahram ibn Mas'ud who had been left in possession which obliged Sanjar to take the field again. This struggle was Arslan's last, he was constrained to seek refuge among the Afghans, but was overtaken and put to death, leaving Bahram ibn Mas'ud in undisturbed possession of the throne which Arslan ibn Mas'ud himself had occupied for only two years.

== See also ==
- Ghaznavids
- Ghurid dynasty
- Eldiguzids

== Notes ==
Arslan-Shah of Ghazna House of Sabuktegin Born: ? Died: 1118
Regnal titles
| Preceded by Shir-Zad | Sultan of the Ghaznavid Empire; 1116 – 1117 | Succeeded by Bahram-Shah |
