= Abu Sahl Zawzani =

Chief secretary of the Ghaznavids from 1040 onwards

Abu Sahl Muhammad ibn Husayn (or Hasan) Zawzani (Persian: ابوسهل محمد حسین زوزنی), better known as Abu Sahl Zawzani (ابوسهل زوزنی; also spelled Zuzani), was a Persian statesman who served as the chief secretary of the Ghaznavids briefly in 1040, and later from 1041 to an unknown date. Zawzani died in 1054.

== Biography ==
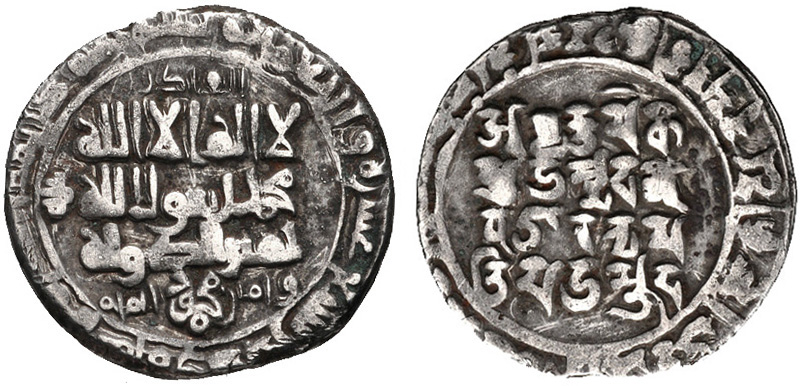
Coin of Mahmud.

=== Origins and service under Mahmud ===
The son of a prominent religious scholar from Zawzan named Husayn or Hasan, Zawzani is first mentioned as serving as the lecturer to the sons of Sultan Mahmud's vizier Ahmad Maymandi, whom two of them are known; Abd al-Razzaq Maymandi and Sa'id Maymandi. However, when Ahmad Maymandi and his sons fell into disfavor and were imprisoned, Zawzani eulogized Ahmad's successor Hasanak Mikali. Zawzani later became the assistant of prince Mas'ud I, who then served as the governor of Herat. Zawzani quickly rose to high prominence, but this resulted in him being suspected of heresy by his jealous opponents. However, the historian Abul-Fazl Bayhaqi, who knew Zawzani, dismiss this accusation.

=== Service under Mas'ud I ===
Mahmud later died in 1030, and a civil war shortly ensured between his two sons, the youngest one being Mohammad Ghaznavi, and the oldest one being Mas'ud I. Zawzani, who supported Mas'ud I, left the Ghaznavid capital of Ghazni, and arrived to Damghan, where Mas'ud and his supporters were preparing an attack on Ghazni. Several other statesmen and military officers such as Ali Daya shortly joined Mas'ud, thus increasing his strength on his march to Ghazni. During this period, in the words of the historian Yusofi, "Zawzani became a sort of vizier and rose in prestige and influence. He also became feared, since he exercised his bent toward vengefulness, spite, and intrigue".

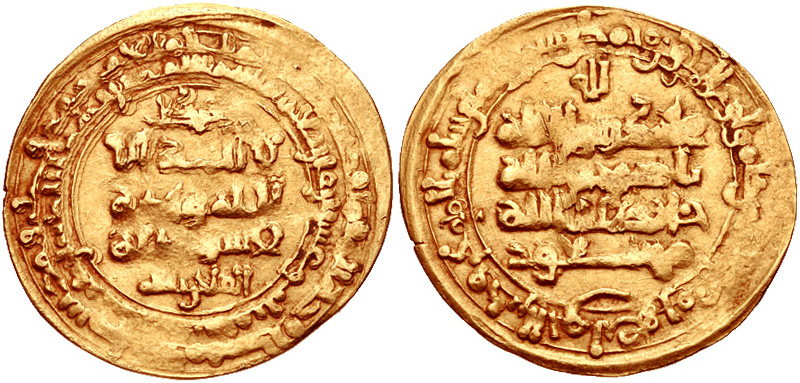
Coin of Mas'ud I.

Mas'ud I shortly marched towards the Ghazni, where he successfully defeated Mohammad and imprisoned the latter. He then had Hasanak, who had supported Mohammad, imprisoned in Balkh. Through the efforts of Zawzani, Mas'ud had Hasanak charged of infidelity, and had him executed. Meanwhile, Zawzani helped Ahmad Maymandi, who had been released from prison, to regain the vizier office. Although Ahmad did not trust Zawzani, he appointed Zawzani as the chief administrator of the Ghaznavid army. Filled with dissatisfaction about the office, Zawzani used his angry mood to turn Mas'ud against the people he did not like. Despite the opposition of Ahmad, Zawzani managed to make Mas'ud regain riches from several officers which Mohammad had given to them in order to gain support. This choice heavily decreased the honor of Zawzani.

Map of Khorasan, Transoxiana and Tokharistan.

In 1032, Zawzani managed to urge Mas'ud to assassinate the Ghaznavid governor of Khwarazm, Altun Tash, whom Zawzani suspected of treachery. However, Altun Tash managed to survive the assassination and have the assassin captured. Mas'ud, who feared that Altun Tash would declare independence after the failed assassination attempt, had Zawzani imprisoned at Marw in order to avoid a rebellion. He also took Zawzani's wealth and servants, which had spread in many places such as Marw, Nishapur, Ghur, Badghis, Ghazni, and Balkh. However, Zawzani was later freed, and after some time, once again rose into high favor under Mas'ud.

In 1040, Zawzani succeeded the deceased Abu Nasr Mushkan as the chief secretary. During this period, Zawzani had good relations with the historian Abul-Fazl Bayhaqi, and helped him in some of his problems. Because of this, Bayhaqi also helped Zawzani in his secretarial tasks. In 1040, Zawzani was present at the disastrous Battle of Dandanaqan against the Seljuq Turks, who managed to emerge victorious during the battle. During the same period, a rebellion occurred under Abu'l-Fadl Kurnaki, which Zawzani was blamed for by Mas'ud, and was dismissed from his office, and sent to Bust. However, the army of Mas'ud shortly revolted against him, and had his brother Mohammad restored to the Ghaznavid throne. Mohammad then had Mas'ud imprisoned at Giri, where he was shortly executed either on the orders of Mohammad or Mohammad's son Ahmad.

=== Service under Mawdud and the latter's successors ===
Mas'ud's son Mawdud, shortly avenged his father's death by defeating and killing Mohammad. He then crowned himself as the new ruler of the Ghaznavid Empire, and restored Zawzani to the chief secretary office. After this, Zawzani is much less mentioned in sources, but is known to have been living during the reign of Sultan Mas'ud II, Ali, Abd al-Rashid, Toghrul, and Farrukh-Zad. Zawzani later died in 1054.

== Sources ==
- Nashat, Guity; Beck, Lois (2003). Women in Iran from the Rise of Islam to 1800. University of Illinois Press. pp. 1–253. ISBN 978-0-252-07121-8.
- Yusofi, G. H. (1983). "ABŪ SAHL ZŪZANĪ". Encyclopaedia Iranica, Vol. I, Fasc. 4. pp. 373–374.
- Bosworth, C. Edmund (2001). "GHAZNAVIDS". Encyclopaedia Iranica, Vol. X, Fasc. 6. London et al. pp. 578–583.
- Bosworth, C. Edmund (1983). "ABU'L-FATḤ YŪSOF". Encyclopaedia Iranica, Vol. I, Fasc. 3. p. 287.
- Bosworth, C. E (1995). The Later Ghaznavids: Splendour and Decay: The Dynasty in Afghanistan and Northern India 1040-1186. ISBN 9788121505772.

Preceded by Abu Nasr Mushkan	Chief secretary of the Ghaznavid Empire; 1040	Unknown
Unknown	Chief secretary of the Ghaznavid Empire; 1041 – ???	Unknown
