= List of Ghaznavid viziers =

Vizier of the Ghaznavid Dynasty
- Style: His Excellency
- Appointer: Ghaznavid Sultan
- Formation: c. 977
- First holder: Abu'l-Hasan Isfaraini (first mentioned)
- Final holder: Abu'l-Ma'ali Nasrallah (last mentioned)
- Abolished: c. 1186

This is the list of viziers of the Ghaznavid dynasty. All of them were ethnically Iranian.

== List of viziers ==
Name	Entered office	Left office	Place of origin
Abu'l-Hasan Isfaraini	998	1010	Isfarain, Khorasan
Ahmad Maymandi	1013	1024	Maymand, Zabulistan
Hasanak the Vizier	1024	1030	Nishapur, Khorasan
Abu Sahl Hamdawi	1030	1030	Khorasan (?)
Ahmad Maymandi	1031	1032	Maymand, Zabulistan
Ahmad Shirazi	1032	1043	Shiraz, Fars
Abd al-Razzaq Maymandi	1043	1052	Maymand, Zabulistan
Husayn ibn Mihran	1052 (?)	1055	Khorasan (?)
Abu Bakr ibn Abi Salih	1055	1059	Khorasan (?)
Abu Sahl Khujandi	1055	?	Khujand
Abd al-Hamid Shirazi	1077/8	1114/5	Shiraz, Fars
Abu'l-Fath Yusuf	1116	1117	Zabulistan (?)
Abu'l-Ma'ali Nasrallah	after 1160	before 1186	Ghazni, Zabulistan

== Sources ==
- Bosworth, C. Edmund (1975). "The early Ghaznavids". In Frye, R. N. (ed.). The Cambridge History of Iran, Volume 4: From the Arab Invasion to the Saljuqs. Cambridge: Cambridge University Press. pp. 162–198. ISBN 0-521-20093-8.
- Yusofi, G. H. (1984). "Aḥmad Maymandī". Encyclopaedia Iranica, Vol. I, Fasc. 6. pp. 650–652.
- Houtsma, M. Th (1987). E.J. Brill's First Encyclopaedia of Islam 1913–1936. Brill. pp. 1–299. ISBN 978-90-04-08265-6.
- Bosworth, C. Edmund (1985). "ʿAlī b. ʿObaydallāh Ṣādeq". Encyclopaedia Iranica, Vol. I, Fasc. 8. London et al. p. 853.
- Bosworth, C. Edmund (2001). "Ghaznavids". Encyclopaedia Iranica, Vol. X, Fasc. 6. London et al. pp. 578–583.
- Bosworth, C. Edmund (2011). The Ornament of Histories: A History of the Eastern Islamic Lands AD 650-1041: The Persian Text of Abu Sa'id 'Abd Al-Hayy Gardizi. I.B.Tauris. pp. 1–169. ISBN 978-1-84885-353-9.
- Richards, D.S. (2014). The Annals of the Saljuq Turks: Selections from al-Kamil fi'l-Ta'rikh of Ibn al-Athir. Routledge. pp. 1–320. ISBN 978-1-317-83254-6.
- Nazim, M.; Bosworth, C. Edmund (1991). "The Encyclopedia of Islam, Volume 6, Fascicules 107–108". The Encyclopaedia of Islam, Vol. VI. Brill. pp. 1–1044. ISBN 90-04-08112-7.
- Nashat, Guity; Beck, Lois (2003). Women in Iran from the Rise of Islam to 1800. University of Illinois Press. pp. 1–253. ISBN 978-0-252-07121-8.
- Bosworth, C. Edmund (1984). "Āl-e Maʾmūn". Archived copy. Encyclopaedia Iranica, Vol. I, Fasc. 7. C. Edmund Bosworth. pp. 762–764. Archived from the original on 2012-09-27.
- Frye, R.N. (1975). "The Sāmānids". In Frye, R.N. (ed.). The Cambridge History of Iran, Volume 4: From the Arab Invasion to the Saljuqs. Cambridge: Cambridge University Press. pp. 136–161. ISBN 0-521-20093-8.
- Bosworth, C. Edmund (2010). "ʿAbd-al-Razzāq b. Aḥmad b. Ḥasan Maymandi". Encyclopaedia Iranica, Vol. I, Fasc. 2. London et al.: C. Edmund Bosworth. pp. 157–158.
- Bosworth, C. Edmund (2012). "Maḥmud b. Sebüktegin". Encyclopaedia Iranica.
- Bosworth, C. Edmund (1998). "The Ghaznavids". History of Civilizations of Central Asia: Age of Achievement, A.D. 750 to the end of the 15th-century. UNESCO. pp. 103–122. ISBN 9789231032110.
- Yusofi, G. H. (1983). "Abū Sahl Ḥamdowī". Encyclopaedia Iranica, Vol. I, Fasc. 4. pp. 369–370.
- Sharma, Sunil (2000). Persian Poetry at the Indian Frontier: Masʻŝud Saʻd Salmân of Lahore. Orient Blackswan. pp. 1–208. ISBN 8178240092.
- Pollock, Sheldon (2003). Literary Cultures in History: Reconstructions from South Asia. University of California Press. pp. 1–1066. ISBN 0520228219.
