= Abu'l-Fadl Bayhaqi =

Persian historian

Abu'l-Fazl Muhammad ibn Husayn Bayhaqi
- ابوالفضل بیهقی
- Born: c. 995; Harethabad, Bayhaq, Khorasan, Samanid Emirate
- Died: September 21, 1077 (aged approximately 81–82); Ghazni, Zabulistan, Ghaznavid Empire
- Occupations: Secretary; historian
- Notable work: Tarikh-i Bayhaqi
- Parent: Husayn (father)

Abūʾl-Fazl Muḥammad ibn Ḥusayn Bayhaqī (Persian: ابوالفضل محمد بن حسین بیهقی; died September 21, 1077), better known as Abu'l-Fazl Bayhaqi (ابوالفضل بیهقی; also spelled Beyhaqi), was a secretary, historian and author.

Educated in the major cultural center of Nishapur, and employed at the court of the famous Ghaznavid Sultan Mahmud, Bayhaqi was a highly cultured man, whose primary work—the Tarikh-i Bayhaqi, is considered a key source of information about the Ghaznavid era, written in Persian prose that influenced writers of subsequent eras.

Bayhaqi is praised by modern scholars for his frankness, precision, and elegant style in his book, which he had spent 22 years to write, finishing it in thirty volumes, of which however only five volumes and half of the sixth exist today. Julie Scott Meisami places Bayhaqi among the historians of the Islamic Golden Age.

== Life ==
=== Youth and early career ===
Bayhaqi was born in the village of Haresabad in Bayhaq in the Khorasan Province to a Persian family. In his youth Bayhaqi studied in the major cultural center of Nishapur, and later in 1020/1 joined the secretariat (dīvān-e resālat) of Mahmud, where he worked as an assistant and pupil under the chief secretary Abu Nasr Mushkan for 19 years.

After Mushkan's death in 1039/40, Mas'ud I (r. 1030–1040) appointed Bayhaqi as minister to Abu Sahl Zawzani, who had succeeded Muskhan as the chief secretary of the empire. Muskhan substantially urged the Sultan that Bayhaqi should be his successor, and the Persian vizier Ahmad Shirazi had also commended Bayhaqi in the Sultan's attendance. Bayhaqi (who was at that time 46 years old) was supposedly told by Mas'ud I that he was too young to be appointed the new chief secretary.

=== Later career ===
Zawzani was not as accomplished in the management of the secretariat as his predecessor had been, and his methods were completely dissimilar. Furthermore, Bayhaqi was often a victim of his bad temper, which made the latter send a secret letter of relinquishment of his responsibility to the Sultan, who, however, heartened Bayhaqi to continue serving in his post, whilst ordering his vizier to inform that Zawzani should behave properly towards Bayhaqi at the secretariat. This he did, however; Mas'ud I died shortly afterwards being deserted by his army after a disastrous defeat against the Seljuq Turks, who then conquered Khorasan. Mas'ud's death made Zawzani resume his bad treatment of Bayhaqi once more. Bayhaqi experienced several problems after Mas'ud I's death, probably partly due to his own failings, which he himself often recognizes.

During the reign of Abd al-Rashid (r. 1049-1052) Bayhaqi was finally selected as the chief secretary. He was, however, after a short period removed from the post. According to Ibn Funduq, he was jailed by the judge (qāżī) of Ghazni on the complaint of having failed to meet the unpaid obligatory fee to a wife, but according to Aufi, the reason behind his imprisonment was due to the ploys of his enemies. A slave named Tuman (or Nuyan) was afterwards ordered by the Sultan to seize Bayhaqi's possessions.

In 1052, the rebellious slave-soldier (ghulam) Toghrul seized Ghazni, had Abd al-Rashid killed, and had the sultan's men jailed in a stronghold, where Bayhaqi was also moved. However, Toghrul's reign lasted only 15 days; he was defeated and killed by Ghaznavid loyalists, who put Farrukh-zad (r. 1053–1059) on the throne. Bayhaqi was then released from imprisonment.

=== The writing of Tarikh-i Bayhaqi and death ===
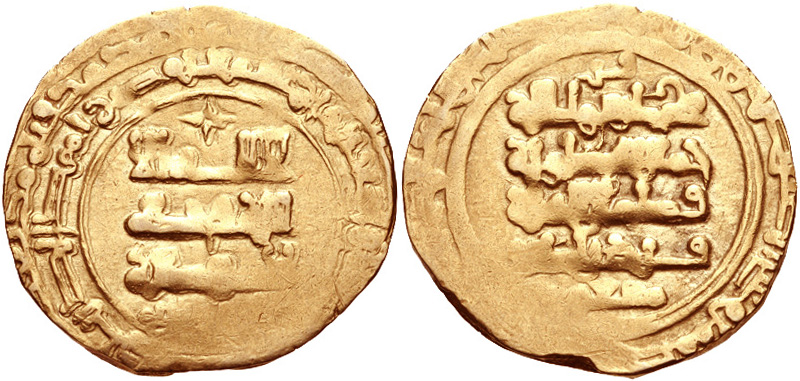
Coin of Sultan Farrukh-zad (r. 1053-1059).

According to Ibn Funduq, Bayhaqi served as secretary under Farrukh-zad and at the end of the latter's reign withdrew from bureaucratic life and settled in Ghazni, where he started to write the Tarikh-i Bayhaqi. However, judging from Bayhaqi's few comments in his book on Farrukh-zad's rule, it appears that he did not take part in Farrukh-zad's court. Indeed, he evidently reports that during those years he was occupied on writing his history.

According to the Aḵbār al-dawla al-saljūqīya (Chronicles of the Seljuq state), Bayhaqi formulated the peace treaty between the Seljuqs and Ghaznavids in 1058. He accordingly may have been called back to work after his dishonor and imprisonment during the rule of Abd al-Rashid. Anyhow the information of the Tarikh-i Bayhaqi evidently show that Bayhaqi in his old age, until his death in 1077, had committed himself completely to the writing of the book. His tomb is located in his birthplace, Harethabad.

== Sources ==
- Amirsoleimani, Soheila (1999). "Truths and Lies: Irony and Intrigue in the Tārīkh-i Bayhaqī". Iranian Studies. 32 (2, The Uses of Guile: Literary and Historical Moments, Spring). Taylor & Francis: 243–259. doi:10.1080/00210869908701955.
- Bosworth, C. E (1995). The Later Ghaznavids: Splendour and Decay: The Dynasty in Afghanistan and Northern India 1040-1186. Munshiram Manoharlal Publishers Private, Limited. ISBN 9788121505772.
- Bosworth, C. Edmund (2004). "An Oriental Samuel Pepys? Abuʾl-Faḍl Bayhaqī's Memoirs of Court Life in Eastern Iran and Afghanistan, 1030-1041". Journal of the Royal Asiatic Society. Third Series, Vol. 14, No. 1, Apr.
- Bosworth, C. Edmund (2012). "Maḥmud b. Sebüktegin". Encyclopaedia Iranica.
- Yusofi, G. H. (1988). "Bayhaqī, Abu'l-Fażl". Encyclopaedia Iranica, Vol. III, Fasc. 8. pp. 889–894.
- E.G. Browne. Literary History of Persia. (Four volumes, 2,256 pages, and twenty-five years in the writing). 1998. ISBN 0-7007-0406-X
- Jan Rypka, History of Iranian Literature. Reidel Publishing Company. ASIN B-000-6BXVT-K
- Dabashi, Hamid (2012). The World of Persian Literary Humanism. Harvard University Press. pp. 1–384. ISBN 978-0674070615.
