= Ahmad Maymandi =

Vizier of the Ghaznavids (1013–24, 1031–32)

Vizier of the Ghaznavid Empire
- In office 1013–1024
- Monarch: Mahmud of Ghazni
- Preceded by: Abu'l-Hasan Isfaraini
- Succeeded by: Hasanak Mikali

Vizier of the Ghaznavid Empire
- In office 1031–1032
- Monarch: Mas'ud I
- Preceded by: Abu Sahl Hamdawi
- Succeeded by: Ahmad Shirazi

Personal details
- Born: 970s Maymand, Zabulistan
- Died: 31 December 1032 Herat, Khorasan
- Children: Abd al-Razzaq Maymandi; Sa'id Maymandi
- Parent: Hasan Maymandi (father)

Abuʾl-Ḥasan al-Qāsim Aḥmad ibn Ḥasan Maymandī (Note: Persian: ابوالحسن القاسم احمد بن حسن میمندی, better known as Ahmad Maymandi (احمد میمندی; also spelled Maimandi), and also known by his honorific title of Shams al-Kufat (شمس الکفاة; "sun of the capable ones").) (died 31 December 1032) was a Persian vizier of the Ghaznavid ruler Mahmud of Ghazni and the latter's son Mas'ud I of Ghazni.

The son of the governor of Bust, Maymandi was raised as the foster brother of the Ghaznavid prince Mahmud, and would first start his administrative career as the head of the department of correspondences of Khorasan. He would thereafter rapidly rise to higher offices, finally becoming the vizier of the Ghaznavid dynasty in 1013, which would last until 1024, when he was arrested due to the great amount of wealth that he had gained, which the suspicious Mahmud disliked.

However, after a brief civil war, which ended in 1030, Maymandi was freed by Mahmud's son Mas'ud I, who offered him the chance of becoming vizier again. He first rejected the offer but later accepted it in 1031. Maymandi's second vizierate would only last one year when he died at Herat. He was succeeded by Ahmad Shirazi.

== Biography ==
=== Origins and early career ===
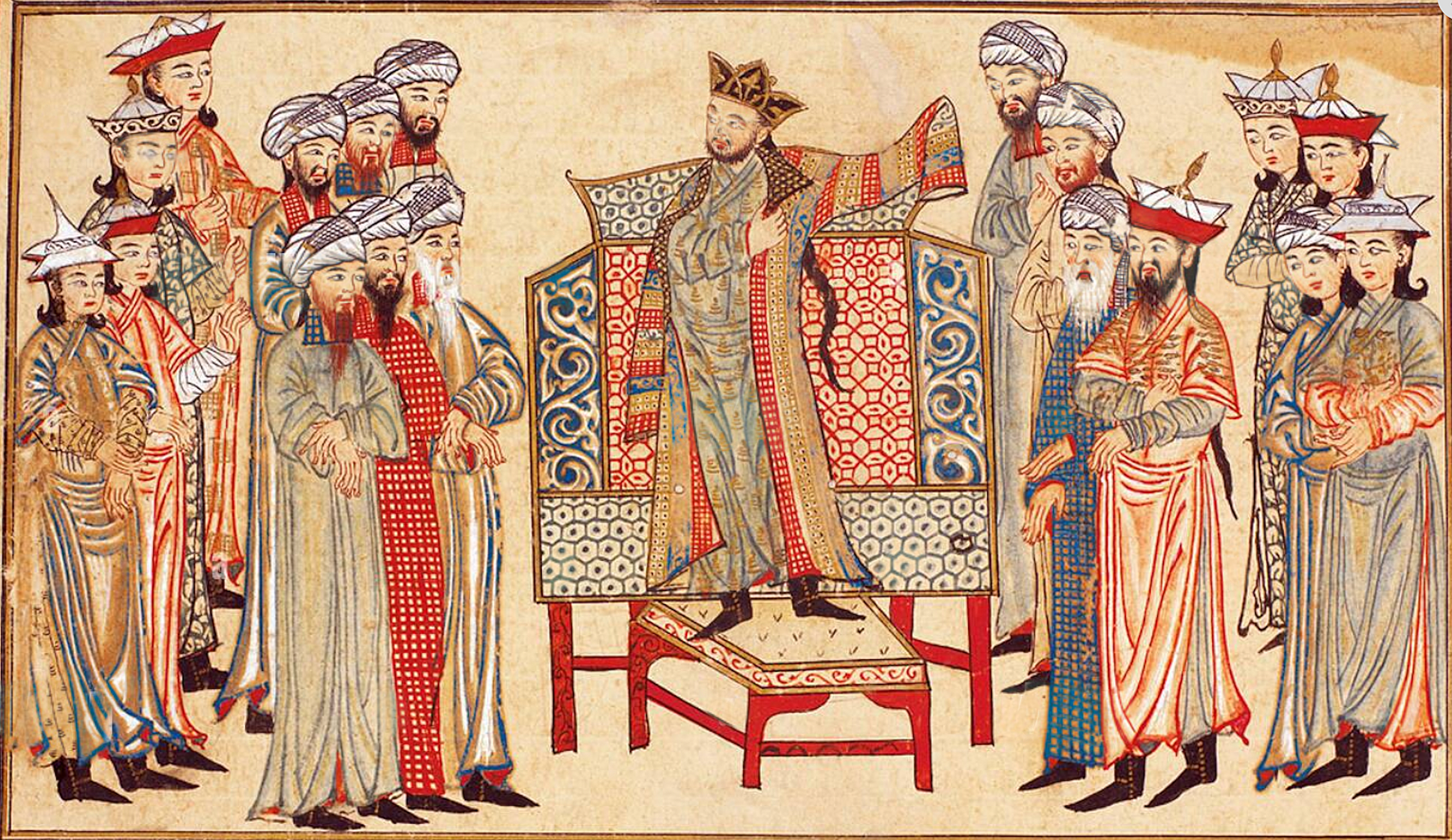
Artwork of Mahmud receiving a robe of honor from the Abbasid caliph al-Qadir, thus legitimizing Mahmud as an independent monarch.

Ahmad Maymandi's father, Hasan Maymandi, was from a town named Maymand in Zabulistan, a region known for its popular traditions about the mythological Iranian warrior Rostam. Hasan was the governor of Bust under Mahmud's father, Sabuktigin, whose kingdom was then a vassal state of the Samanids, who were the lords of Khorasan, and ruled much of the region through their vassals. During Hasan's governorship of Bust, Sabuktigin crucified him, an action which Sabuktigin later regretted. Maymandi was the foster brother and school-fellow of Mahmud, who was also from Zabulistan on his maternal side. Maymandi began his administrative career in 994 as head of the department of correspondence during Mahmud's governorship of Khorasan under his Samanid overlords. Maymandi was later promoted to chief accountant and head of the military department. He was also appointed as governor of Bust and Rukhkhaj.

Sabuktigin died in 997, and was succeeded by his son Ismail as the ruler of the Ghaznavid dynasty. Mahmud, who had more administrative experience than his brother, claimed the throne for himself, and the following year managed to defeat his brother and gain control over the Ghaznavid dynasty. Mahmud quickly began increasing his independence from the Samanids, and eventually divided the Samanid state with the Karakhanids, ending the Samanid dynasty.

=== First vizierate and downfall ===
The first vizier of Mahmud was a Persian named Abu'l-Hasan Isfaraini. In 1010, following Isfaraini's downfall and imprisonment, Maymandi was appointed governor of Khorasan and tax-collector of the region. During his governorship, he was praised by the inhabitants of the region, and managed to hand out extensive funds to Mahmud, whose financial demands were never moderate. Two years later, Maymandi was finally appointed as the vizier of Mahmud.

Map of Khorasan, Transoxiana and Tokharistan.

Maymandi quickly began centralizing the Empire, and restored Arabic as the administrative language of the Empire (Isfaraini had made Persian as the administrative language). However, according to the historian Richard N. Frye, Maymandi was not successful in his effort to change the administrative language to Arabic. Maymandi's enemies included Altun Tash, Hasanak Mikali (who later succeeded Maymandi as the vizier of the Empire) and the sister of Mahmud. Among his few supporters were Prince Mas'ud I, Arslan Jadhib, Abu Nasr Mushkan, and probably the former Iranian dynast Abu Nasr Muhammad, whom Maymandi, in the words of the historian Houtsma, "did all in his power to mitigate the degradation of his fall."

In 1017, Maymandi and Mahmud agreed to invade Khwarazm, then under native Iranian Ma'munid dynasty. According to Ghaznavid sources, the reason for Mahmud's invasion of the region was to avenge the murder of his brother-in-law Ma'mun II, but according to modern sources he used the latter's death as an excuse to expand Ghaznavid rule over the Oxus River. In the same year, the Ghaznavid army deposed the Ma'munid ruler Abu'l-Harith Muhammad, and Altun Tash was appointed as the governor of the region.

During the early 1020s, Maymandi urged Mahmud to invade Jibal, which was then under the control of the young Buyid ruler Majd al-Dawla. However, the real ruler of the region was Majd al-Dawla's mother Sayyida Shirin, which was already known by the neighbors of the Buyids, including the Ghaznavids. Mahmud, however, did not agree with him, because he did not feel his empire threatened because of a woman ruling in the region.

In 1024, because Maymandi had gained a great amount of wealth during his career as a vizier, Mahmud removed him from his office, confiscated his property, and had him imprisoned at Kalinjar in India. While the nobles who opposed Maymandi urged Mahmud to execute his former vizier, Mahmud chose instead to spare Maymandi.

=== Second vizierate and death ===
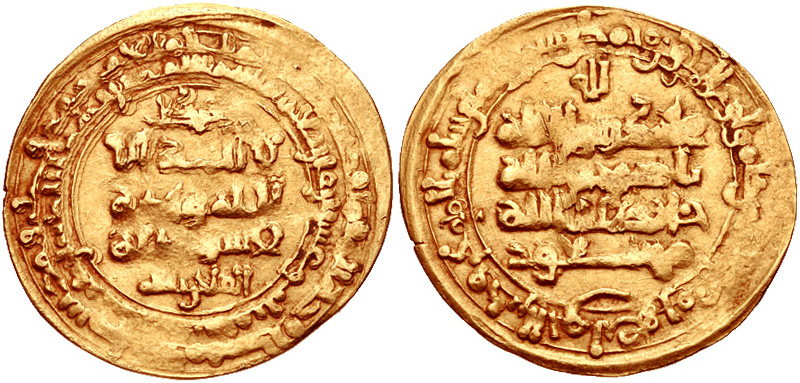
Coin of Mas'ud I.

When Mahmud died in 1030, the Ghaznavid dynasty fell into civil war; his two sons Mas'ud I and Muhammad Ghaznavi both claimed the Ghaznavid throne. Mas'ud managed to emerge victorious during the civil war, and ordered the release of Maymandi. He met him at Balkh and offered him to become his vizier. Maymandi first refused, but later agreed and began his second career as vizier in 1031.

He received full control over financial affairs and the postmasters and inspectors of the empire. Although not being near as wealthy as he used to be during his first vizierate, he delivered food and money to the needy, and sent several expensive gifts to Mas'ud in order to avoid the jealousies which resulted in his fallout with Mahmud.

Maymandi then took revenge against some of his enemies, while forgiving the rest of them, including Hasanak, who Maymandi tried but failed to save from getting executed. In the same year, Maymandi approved Mas'ud's decision to appoint Ali Daya as the commander-in-chief of the army of Khorasan. He also appointed Abu Sahl Zawzani as the chief administrator of the army. Maymandi died on 31 December 1032 at Herat, and was succeeded by Ahmad Shirazi as vizier.

Maymandi had a son named Abd al-Razzaq Maymandi, who also rose to the office of vizier. He also had another son named Sa'id Maymandi, who had a son named Mansur ibn Sa'id who also like Maymandi, occupied high offices.

== Legacy ==
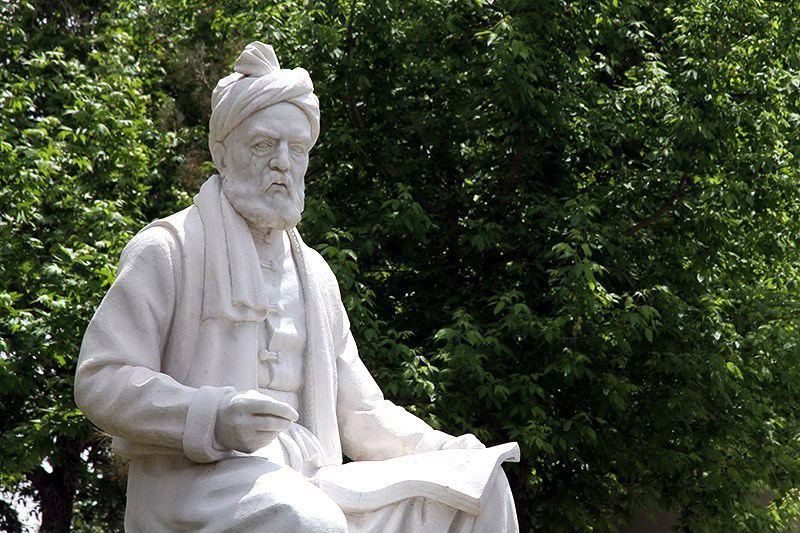
Statue of Ferdowsi, celebrated as the most influential figure in Persian literature, and whose work was sponsored by Maymandi in the Ghaznavid court.

Maymandi was one of the leading statesman of his age, and was commemorated by his biographers, who praised him for his cunning discretion in dealing gently with his enemies who had good relations with Mas'ud, his policy towards the intrusion of the Seljuqs, his disapproval to Mas'ud's offensive in India, his management of the Khwarazm affair, and his proficiency at making appointments.

Maymandi was also praised by poets, such as Farrukhi Sistani, who noted the similarities between Maymandi and the celebrated Buyid vizier Sahib ibn Abbad. Both were men of learning and were indicated as ideal secretarial figures, and were known to have been hospitable with poets. Farrukhi Sistani also wrote fifteen panegyrics in honor of Maymandi, whilst the poet Unsuri wrote two in his honor. Maymandi, together with Mahmud, created a major centre of Persian culture in Ghazni which was the successor to Samanid Bukhara.

From the sages who have gathered at your court,
You are making Ghazni just like Greece.

— Unsuri, in one of his qasidas dedicated to Maymandi.

Utbi, who was a helpful associate of Maymandi, praised him in appreciation for his support. According to 12th-century poet Nizami Aruzi, Maymandi had even attempted to back the later-to-be celebrated Persian poet Ferdowsi when he tried to obtain Mahmud's patronage for the Shahnameh, which would later become the national epic of Iran. Maymandi reportedly also backed the Iranian scholar al-Biruni against Mahmud, however this has been disputed. Abu Sahl Hamdawi, a man of letters and patron of poets, who served in high offices under the Ghaznavids, was originally a student of Maymandi.

Maymandi was harsh and merciless with his civil servants, and was committed to the preservation of the state. The contemporary historian Bayhaqi describes him in his final days as baneful harsh with his taxmen, while at the same time he grieves him as one "with whom bravery, honesty, ability, and greatness all passed away".

== Sources ==
- Bosworth, C. E. (1975). "The early Ghaznavids". In Frye, Richard N. (ed.). The Cambridge History of Iran: From the Arab Invasion to the Saljuqs. Vol. 4. Cambridge: Cambridge University Press. pp. 162–198. ISBN 0-521-20093-8.
- Bosworth, C. Edmund (1984). "Āl-e Maʾmūn". Encyclopaedia Iranica, Vol. I, Fasc. 7. pp. 762–764. Archived from the original on 27 September 2012.
- Bosworth, C. E. (1985). "ʿAlī b. ʿObaydallāh Ṣādeq". Encyclopaedia Iranica, Vol. I, Fasc. 8. London et al. p. 853.
- Bosworth, C. E. (1991). "Maḥmūd b. Sebüktigin". In Bosworth, C. E.; van Donzel, E. & Pellat, Ch. (eds.). The Encyclopaedia of Islam, Second Edition. Volume VI: Mahk–Mid. Leiden: E. J. Brill. pp. 65–66. ISBN 978-90-04-08112-3.
- Bosworth, C. E. (1998). "The Ghaznavids". History of Civilizations of Central Asia: Age of Achievement, A.D. 750 to the end of the 15th-century. UNESCO. pp. 103–122. ISBN 9789231032110.
- Bosworth, C. Edmund (2001). "Ghaznavids". Encyclopaedia Iranica, Vol. X, Fasc. 6. London et al. pp. 578–583.
- Bosworth, C. Edmund (2010). "ʿAbd-al-Razzāq b. Aḥmad b. Ḥasan Maymandi". Encyclopaedia Iranica, Vol. I, Fasc. 2. London et al. pp. 157–158.
- Bosworth, C. Edmund (2012). "Maḥmud b. Sebüktegin". Encyclopaedia Iranica.
- Bosworth, C. Edmund (2011). The Ornament of Histories: A History of the Eastern Islamic Lands AD 650-1041: The Persian Text of Abu Sa'id 'Abd Al-Hayy Gardizi. I.B.Tauris. pp. 1–169. ISBN 978-1-84885-353-9.
- Frye, R.N. (1975). "The Sāmānids". In Frye, Richard N. (ed.). The Cambridge History of Iran: From the Arab Invasion to the Saljuqs. Vol. 4. Cambridge: Cambridge University Press. pp. 136–161. ISBN 0-521-20093-8.
- Richards, D.S. (2014). The Annals of the Saljuq Turks: Selections from al-Kamil fi'l-Ta'rikh of Ibn al-Athir. Routledge. pp. 1–320. ISBN 978-1-317-83254-6.
- Houtsma, M. Th (1987). E.J. Brill's First Encyclopaedia of Islam 1913–1936. Brill. ISBN 978-90-04-08265-6.
- Nashat, Guity; Beck, Lois (2003). Women in Iran from the Rise of Islam to 1800. University of Illinois Press. pp. 1–253. ISBN 978-0-252-07121-8.
- Nazim, M. & Bosworth, C. Edmund (1991). "Maymandī". In Bosworth, C. E.; van Donzel, E. & Pellat, Ch. (eds.). The Encyclopaedia of Islam, Second Edition. Volume VI: Mahk–Mid. Leiden: E. J. Brill. pp. 915–916. ISBN 978-90-04-08112-3.
- Pollock, Sheldon (2003). Literary Cultures in History: Reconstructions from South Asia. University of California Press. pp. 1–1066. ISBN 0520228219.
- Sharma, Sunil (2000). Persian Poetry at the Indian Frontier: Masʻŝud Saʻd Salmân of Lahore. Orient Blackswan. pp. 1–208. ISBN 8178240092.
- Yusofi, G. H. (1983). "Abū Sahl Ḥamdowī". Encyclopaedia Iranica, Vol. I, Fasc. 4. pp. 369–370.
- Yusofi, G. H. (1984). "Aḥmad Maymandī". Encyclopaedia Iranica, Vol. I, Fasc. 6. pp. 650–652.

Preceded by Abu'l-Hasan Isfaraini	Vizier of the Ghaznavid Empire; 1013–1024	Succeeded by Hasanak Mikali
Preceded by Abu Sahl Hamdawi	Vizier of the Ghaznavid Empire; 1031–1032	Succeeded by Ahmad Shirazi
