= Mawdud of Ghazni =

Sultan of the Ghaznavid Empire from 1041 to 1050

Shahāb-ud-Dawla Mawdūd
- Ghaznavid Sultan; Shahāb-ud-Dawla
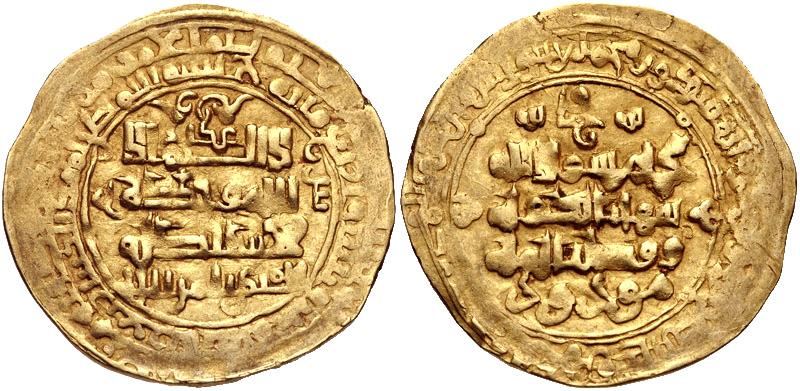
- Gold dinar minted with names of Shahāb-ud-Dawla Mawdūd and caliph al-Qa'im (432–440 AH/1041–1048 AD)

Sultan of the Ghaznavid Empire
- Reign: 19 March 1041 – 1050
- Predecessor: Muhammad of Ghazni
- Successor: Mas'ud II
- Born: Ghazni; Ghaznavid Empire
- Died: c. 1050; Ghazni; Ghaznavid Empire
- Burial: c. 1050; Ghazni (now in Afghanistan)
- Issue: Mas'ud II
Names
- Shahāb-ud-Dawla Mawdūd bin Mas'ud
- House: Ghaznavid Dynasty
- Father: Mas'ud I
- Religion: Sunni Islam

Shahāb-ud-Dawla Mawdūd (Persian: شهاب‌الدوله مودود; died 1050), known as Mawdud of Ghazni (مودود غزنوی), was a sultan of the Ghaznavids from 1041 – 1050. He seized the throne of the sultanate from his uncle, Muhammad of Ghazni, in revenge for the murder of his father, Mas'ud I of Ghazni. His brother Majdud in Lahore did not recognize him as sultan, but his sudden death paved the way for Mawdud to exercise control over the eastern portion of the Ghaznavid Empire.

Mawdud inherited an empire whose entire western half was overrun by the Seljuk Empire and was battling to continue existing. During his reign the further reaches of the Indian conquests and vassal states also broke away. Mawdud was able to hold on to his Afghan realms and Indus valley territories while pushing north into Central Asia and stabilizing his western front with the Seljuqs.

Keikavus, author of the Qabus nama, was a guest at Mawdud's court for seven to eight years.

== Biography ==
=== Early life ===
In 1038, Mawdud was declared by his father as the heir of the Empire. Furthermore, Mawdud helped his father during his campaigns against the Seljuks and the Kara-Khanid Khanate. However, Mas'ud was eventually defeated by the Seljuks at the Battle of Dandanaqan in 1040, and chose to leave Greater Khorasan for India, but was taken captive by his own soldiers, and replaced with his brother Muhammad, who had him killed.

=== Reign ===
Mawdud, who was at Balkh during that time with his father's vizier Ahmad Shirazi, then invaded the domains of Muhammad, and then avenged his father by defeating and killing him at Jalalabad in 1041. Mawdud, now ruling over all of the Ghaznavid Empire except Lahore, which was under the control of his rebellious brother Majdud, then appointed Ahmad Shirazi as his vizier, while Abu Sahl Zawzani was appointed as his chief secretary. In 1042, Mawdud invaded the territories of the Seljuqs and briefly occupied Balkh and Herat. This greatly increased the fame of Mawdud and made the Karakhanid ruler Böritigin acknowledge him as his suzerain. In 1043, Ahmad Shirazi fell out of favor and was replaced with Abd al-Razzaq Maymandi as Mawdud's vizier. During the same time, a rebellion in Sistan was quelled by Mawdud's military slave Toghrul.

In 1043/4, Mawdud invaded Tukharistan but was repelled by the Seljuq prince Alp Arslan. Furthermore, Mawdud also sent soldiers to Sistan in order to exert his authority over the ruler of the region, the Nasrid Abu'l-Fadl Nasr. However, these actions were fruitless, and Sistan soon became a Seljuq vassal state, and thus the Ghaznavid borders were limited to Bost.

=== Campaigns in India ===
Following Majdud's death on 11 August 1043, Mawdud used the opportunity to capture Lahore. Mawdud then invaded Multan and repelled the Ismailis who lived in the region. Lahore's governor Faqih Salti marched against Abul Fateh Daud's son. The Ismaili forced withdrew to Mansura. Multan was surrendered to the Ghaznavids and the khutbah was now read for the Abbasid Caliphate than the Fatimids.

The deposition of Mas'ud gave opportunity for Indian powers to take offensive against the Ghaznavids. Sandanpal, grandson of Kabul Shah attacked Lahore with a coalition of Indian rulers but was defeated and killed. In 1043-4, a combined army of three Hindu princes led by Mahipal of Tomara dyansty, captured Hansi, Nagarkot, Thanesar and other cities from the Ghaznavids, then besieged Lahore, but were defeated.

In ca. 1050, Mawdud, with the aid of Böritigin and an army sent by the former Kakuyid ruler Garshasp I re-invaded Khorasan; Böritigin and his commander Qashgha invaded Khwarezm and Termez, but Mawdud died and thus the invasion failed. The Seljuqs then extended their rule as far as Vakhsh and appointed a certain Abu 'Ali ibn Shadhan as the governor of their new conquests. After this, Böritigin seems to have stopped recognizing the Ghaznavids as his suzerain. Mawdud was succeeded by his son, Mas'ud II.

== Sources ==
- Bosworth, C. E. (1975). "The early Ghaznavids". In Frye, R. N. (ed.). The Cambridge History of Iran, Volume 4: From the Arab Invasion to the Saljuqs. Cambridge: Cambridge University Press. pp. 162–198. ISBN 0-521-20093-8.
- Bosworth, C. E (1995). The Later Ghaznavids: Splendour and Decay: The Dynasty in Afghanistan and Northern India 1040–1186. Munshiram Manoharlal Publishers Private, Limited. ISBN 9788121505772.
- Davidovich, E. A. (1996). "The Karakhanids". History of Civilizations of Central Asia, Volume III: The Crossroads of Civilizations: A.D. 250 to 750. Paris: UNESCO. pp. 119–145. ISBN 92-3-103211-9.
- Bosworth, C. E. (1968). "The Political and Dynastic History of the Iranian World (A.D. 1000–1217)". In Frye, R. N. (ed.). The Cambridge History of Iran, Volume 5: The Saljuq and Mongol periods. Cambridge: Cambridge University Press. pp. 1–202. ISBN 0-521-06936-X.
- Bosworth, C. E. (1984). "AḤMAD ŠĪRĀZĪ". Encyclopaedia Iranica, Vol. I, Fasc. 6. London et al. pp. 660–661.
- Bosworth, C. E. "MAWDUD B. MASʿUD". Encyclopaedia Iranica. London et al.

Preceded by: Muhammad	Ghaznavid Ruler; 1041–1050	Followed by: Mas'ud II
