= Abd al-Razzaq Maymandi =

Vizier of the Ghaznavids

Abd al-Razzaq Maymandi (Persian: عبدالرزاق میمندی; died 11th-century) was a Persian vizier of the Ghaznavid Sultan Maw'dud Ghaznavi and Abd al-Rashid.

== Biography ==
Abd al-Razzaq was the son of Ahmad Maymandi, a prominent Persian nobleman who served as the vizier of the Ghaznavid Sultan Mahmud of Ghazni and the latter's son Mas'ud I of Ghazni. During his early life, Abd al-Razzaq, along with his brothers were tutored by Abu Sahl Zawzani.

He started his career during the reign of Mahmud of Ghazni, but when his father fell into disgrace in 1024, he along with Abd al-Razzaq were imprisoned at Nandana in Punjab. Mahmud died six years later, which threw the Ghaznavid Empire into a civil war; Mahmud's two sons Mas'ud I and Mohammad Ghaznavi both claimed the Ghaznavid throne. However, it was Mas'ud who managed to emerge victorious during the civil war. He then ordered the release of Abd al-Razzaq and Ahmad.

Abd al-Razzaq later participated in the battle of Dandanaqan against the Seljuq Turks. The Ghaznavid army, was, however, defeated and thus the Ghaznavid Empire lost all of Khorasan. During the reign of Ma'sud's successor, Maw'dud Ghaznavi, Abd al-Razzaq became a prominent figure in the Ghaznavid Empire and was appointed as his vizier in 1043. Abd al-Razzaq then served as the vizier of the Empire over seven years until the death of Mawdud in 1050. After the death of Maw'dud, civil war began once again. During the civil war, Abd al-Razzaq freed Abd al-Rashid from prison and proclaimed him as the Sultan of the Ghaznavid Empire.

In 1052, Toghrul of Ghazna, a Turkish slave general, deposed Abd al-Rashid and proclaimed himself as the Sultan of the Ghaznavid Empire. One year later, Farrukh-Zad of Ghazna, a Ghaznavid prince, defeated Toghrul and made order in the Ghaznavid Empire. Abd al-Razzaq also occupied high offices during the reign of Farrukh-Zad, but not as a vizier. Not much more is known about Abd al-Razzaq, he is last mentioned in 1058, and probably died a few years later. He had a nephew named Mansur ibn Sa'id, who also continued to occupy high offices under Ghaznavids.

== Sources ==
- Bosworth, C. E. (2001). "GHAZNAVIDS". Encyclopaedia Iranica, Vol. X, Fasc. 6. London et al. pp. 578–583.
- Bosworth, C. Edmund (2010). "ʿABD-AL-RAZZĀQ b. AḤMAD b. ḤASAN MEYMANDI". Encyclopaedia Iranica, Vol. I, Fasc. 2. London et al.: C. Edmund Bosworth. pp. 157–158.
- Bosworth, C. E. (2011). The Ornament of Histories: A History of the Eastern Islamic Lands AD 650-1041: The Persian Text of Abu Sa'id 'Abd Al-Hayy Gardizi. I.B.Tauris. pp. 1–169. ISBN 978-1-84885-353-9.
- C.E., Bosworth (2012). "Maymandī". Encyclopaedia of Islam, Second Edition. Leiden and New York: BRILL. ISBN 9789004161214.
- Richards, D.S. (2014). The Annals of the Saljuq Turks: Selections from al-Kamil fi'l-Ta'rikh of Ibn al-Athir. Routledge. pp. 1–320. ISBN 978-1-317-83254-6.
- Yusofi, G. H. (1983). "ABŪ SAHL ZŪZANĪ". Encyclopaedia Iranica, Vol. I, Fasc. 4. pp. 373–374.

Preceded by Abd al-Hamid ibn Ahmad Shirazi	Vizier of the Ghaznavid Empire; 1043 – 1052	Unknown
