= Abu'l-Ma'ali Nasrallah =

Vizier of the Ghaznavids

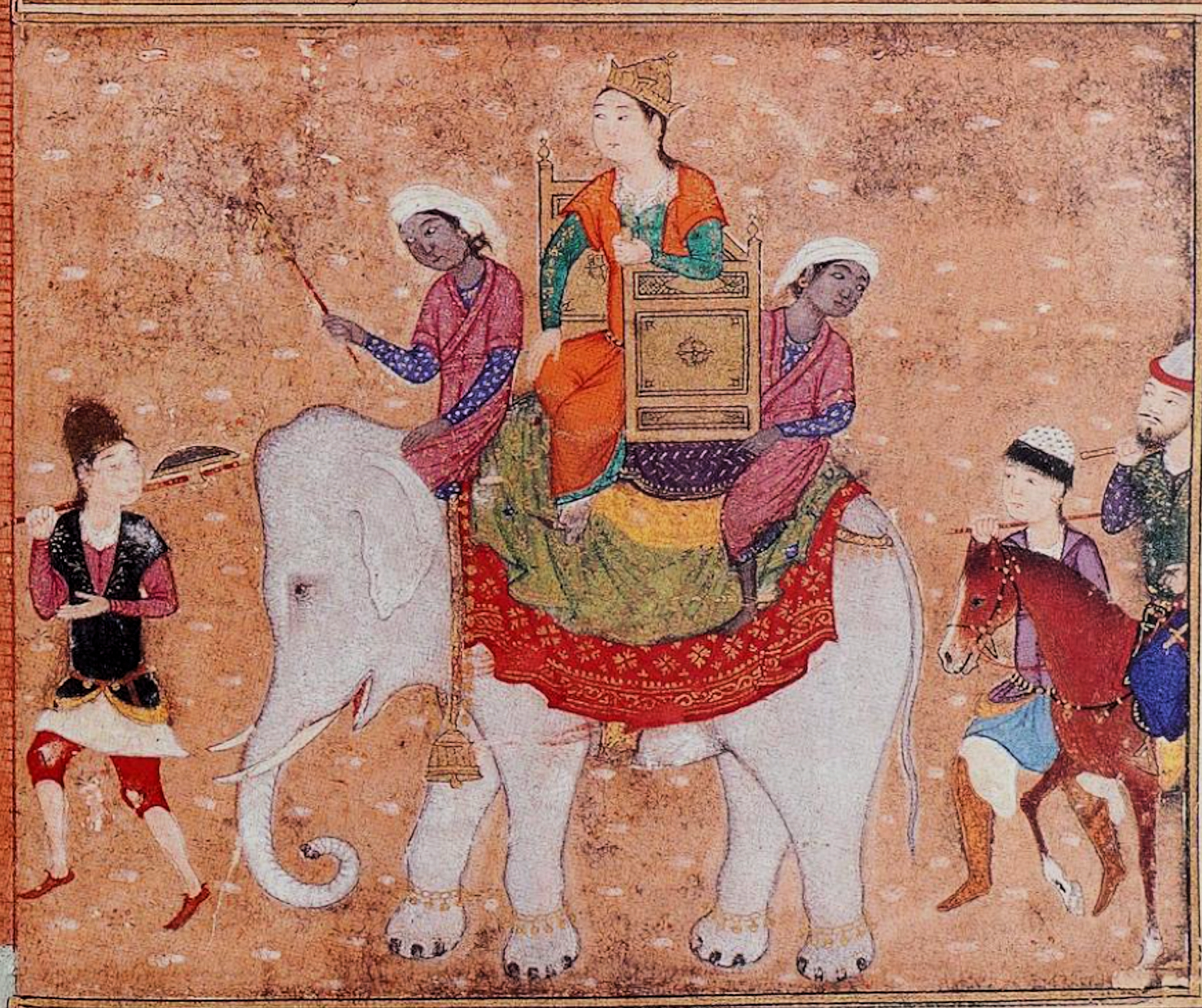
"The New King Paraded around the Town on a White Elephant". Kalila and Dimna of Abu'l-Mali Nasrallah, 1410-1425, Tabriz (resued by Baysunghur in Herat in 1431). Topkaki Saray Museum, H.362, fol. 169r.

Nasrallah ibn Muhammad ibn Abd al-Hamid Shirazi (Persian: نصرالله بن محمد بن عبدالحمید شیرازی), better known as Abu'l-Mali Nasrallah (ابوالمالی نصرالله), was a Persian poet and statesman who served as the vizier of the Ghaznavid Sultan Khusrau Malik.

== Biography ==
Nasrallah was born in Ghazni; he was the grandson of Abd al-Hamid Shirazi, a prominent Ghaznavid vizier, who himself was the son of the prominent Ghaznavid vizier Ahmad Shirazi, who was the son of Abu Tahir Shirazi, a secretary under the Samanids, whose family was originally from Shiraz in southern Iran. Nasrallah later became a secretary at the Ghaznavid court, and also became a poet.

== Kalila wa Dimna ==
Between 1143 and 1146, Nasrallah translated the Arabic translated Indian fable story Kalila wa Dimna to Persian, and dedicated it to Sultan Bahram-Shah.

During the reign of the Bahram-Shah's grandson, the last Ghaznavid Sultan Khusrau Malik, Nasrallah was appointed as his vizier, but later fell into disfavor and was imprisoned, and then executed.

== Sources ==
- Berthels, E. & Brujin, J. T. P. de (1993). "Naṣr Allāh b. Muḥammad". In Bosworth, C. E.; van Donzel, E.; Heinrichs, W. P. & Pellat, Ch. (eds.). The Encyclopaedia of Islam, Second Edition. Volume VII: Mif–Naz. Leiden: E. J. Brill. pp. 1016–1017. doi:10.1163/1573-3912_islam_SIM_5840. ISBN 978-90-04-09419-2.
- Bosworth, C. E. (1968). "The Political and Dynastic History of the Iranian World (A.D. 1000–1217)". In Boyle, John Andrew (ed.). The Cambridge History of Iran: The Saljuq and Mongol Periods. Vol. 5. Cambridge: Cambridge University Press. pp. 1–202. ISBN 0-521-06936-X.
- Bosworth, C. E. (2001). "GHAZNAVIDS". In Yarshater, Ehsan (ed.). Encyclopædia Iranica. Vol. X/6: Germany VI–Gindaros. London and New York: Routledge & Kegan Paul. pp. 578–583. ISBN 978-0-933273-55-9.

| Unknown | Vizier of the Ghaznavid Empire ??? | Unknown |
