= Tash Farrash =

Ghaznavid governor of Jibal (d. 1037)

Tash Farrash was a Turkic military officer of the Ghaznavid Empire in the mid-11th century. He is described as the chamberlain (hajib) of the Ghaznavid Sultan Mas'ud I. In 1031, he was appointed as the governor of Jibal by Mas'ud I. In 1033, Tash Farrash was sent on an expedition to Ray against the Turkmens, who had been causing disruption in the area; Tash Farrash managed to defeat the Turkmens and execute 50 of their chiefs, which included a prominent one named Yaghmur. However, Tash Farrash's tyranny towards the inhabitants of Jibal made Mas'ud I replace him with Abu Sahl Hamduwi as the governor of the region. Tash Farrash was later sent on another expedition against the Turkmens, but was defeated and killed by the Kakuyids in 1037.

== Sources ==
- Bosworth, C. E. (1968). "The Political and Dynastic History of the Iranian World (A.D. 1000–1217)". In Frye, R. N. (ed.). The Cambridge History of Iran, Volume 5: The Saljuq and Mongol periods. Cambridge: Cambridge University Press. pp. 1–202. ISBN 0-521-06936-X.
- Bosworth, C. E. (1975). "The early Ghaznavids". In Frye, R. N. (ed.). The Cambridge History of Iran, Volume 4: From the Arab Invasion to the Saljuqs. Cambridge: Cambridge University Press. pp. 162–198. ISBN 0-521-20093-8.
- Richards, D.S. (2014). The Annals of the Saljuq Turks: Selections from al-Kamil fi'l-Ta'rikh of Ibn al-Athir. Routledge. pp. 1–320. ISBN 978-1-317-83254-6.
- Bosworth, C.E. (1963). The Ghaznavids, 994-1040. Edinburgh University Press.
