= Begtoghdi =

Ghaznavid commander

Begtoghdi (بگتغدی; meaning “a prince has been born, has arisen”), also known by the Persianized form as Baktoghdi (بکتغدی), was a Turkic slave commander who served under the early Ghaznavid rulers, but later fell out of favor and was executed.

== Biography ==
Begtoghdi is first mentioned as a minor officer during the reign of Sultan Mahmud, but during the reign of the latter's son Mas'ud I, he rose to high offices; he was in 1035 appointed as the commander-in-chief of Khorasan, thus succeeding his comrade Ali Daya. Meanwhile, the Seljuq Turks under the leadership of Tughril, asked Mas'ud for asylum. Mas'ud, however, considered the nomadic Turks a dangerous threat and sent an army under Begtoghdi, who fought them near Nasa, but was defeated. However, another Ghaznavid officer named Sahib Husain Mikali, continued to fight, but was also defeated and was captured by Tughril's brother Chaghri Beg. Mas'ud was then forced to cede Nasa, Farava and Dihistan to the Seljuq in return for their recognition of Ghaznavid authority.

Because of his failure, Begtoghdi was replaced by another general named Subashi as commander-in-chief of Khorasan. In 1038, Begtoghdi, this time with Subashi, were sent by Mas'ud to combat the Seljuqs, but once again suffered a defeat near Sarakhs. Begtoghdi, along with his comrades Ali Daya and Subashi, are later mentioned as participating at the Battle of Dandanaqan, which resulted in a disastrous Ghaznavid defeat, and gave the Seljuqs the opportunity to conquer all of western Khorasan.

Mas'ud, who blamed Begtoghdi and his comrades for the disastrous Ghaznavid defeat, had them imprisoned and then shortly executed in India.

== Sources ==
- Bosworth, C. E. (1975). "The early Ghaznavids". In Frye, R. N. (ed.). The Cambridge History of Iran, Volume 4: From the Arab Invasion to the Saljuqs. Cambridge: Cambridge University Press. pp. 162–198. ISBN 0-521-20093-8.
- Bosworth, C. Edmund (1989). "BEGTOḠDÏ". Encyclopaedia Iranica, Vol. IV, Fasc. 1. London et al.: C. Edmund Bosworth. p. 86.
