= Abu'l-Hasan Isfarayini =

Vizier of the Ghaznavids (998–1010)

Abu'l-Hasan Ali ibn Fadl ibn Ahmad Isfarayini

Vizier of the Ghaznavid Empire
- In office 998–1010
- Monarch: Mahmud of Ghazni
- Preceded by: office established
- Succeeded by: Ahmad Maymandi

Personal details
- Born: Esfarayen, Khorasan
- Died: Ghazni, Ghaznavid Empire

Abu'l-Hasan Ali ibn Fadl ibn Ahmad Isfarayini (Persian: ابوالحسن علی بن فضل بن احمد اسفراینی, died 1013/14), commonly known as Abu'l-Hasan Isfarayini (ابوالحسن اسفراینی), was a Persian vizier of the Ghaznavid sultan Mahmud of Ghazni (r. 998–1030) from 998 to 1010.

== Biography ==
Isfarayini was most likely from the town of Isfarayin in the northwestern part of Khurasan. Not much is known about his early life; he began his career as a Samanid secretary (dabir) under the Turkic slave-general Fa'iq. During this period the Samanid dynasty was in heavy decline and was struggling for holding control over Khurasan and Transoxiana from several ambitious military leaders who had rebelled against their authority, the most dangerous ones being Fa'iq and the Simjurid Abu 'Ali Simjuri.

The Ghaznavid prince and Samanid general Sebüktigin, however, managed to defeat the rebels, but soon took control over Khurasan, while the remains of the Samanid dynasty in Bukhara was conquered by the Kara-Khanid Khanate. Isfarayini shortly changed his allegiance to the Ghaznavids, where he rose to prominent offices. In 997, Sebüktigin died and was succeeded by his son Ismail, who soon, however, was defeated by his brother Mahmud, who crowned himself as the new ruler of the Ghaznavid dynasty, and shortly appointed Isfarayini as his vizier, thus making Isfarayini become the first vizier of the Ghaznavid dynasty. Isfarayini later changed the administrate language of the Ghaznavid state from Arabic to Persian.

Isfarayini's main task was to find the money to finance the military campaigns of the Ghaznavids, and managed to accomplish that for a few years; he managed to raise a large sum in only two days. However, the situation became troublesome by drought and consequent bad harvest, and a plague that followed. Still in 1010/1, Isfarayini managed to raise a considerable amount in Herat, which, however, was not enough for Mahmud, who ordered him to also use his own money to finance the Ghaznavid military campaigns. Isfarayini, however, disobeyed, and went voluntarily to prison; his property was confiscated and when he was accused of extortion, he was brutally tortured, which resulted in his death in 1013/4. Some authors mention that one of the reasons for the downfall of Isfarayini was because of a quarrel between Mahmud and Isfarayini over a Turkic slave.

Isfarayini was succeeded by Ahmad Maymandi, who restored Arabic as the administrate language of the Ghaznavid state. Isfarayini had a son named Hajjaj, who became a prominent scholar, and an unnamed daughter.

== Sources ==
- Bosworth, C. E. (1975). "The early Ghaznavids". In Frye, R. N. (ed.). The Cambridge History of Iran, Volume 4: From the Arab Invasion to the Saljuqs. Cambridge: Cambridge University Press. pp. 162–198. ISBN 0-521-20093-8.
- Bosworth, C. E. (1983). "Abu'l-Ḥasan Esfarāʾīnī". In Yarshater, Ehsan (ed.). Encyclopædia Iranica. Vol. I/3: Ablution, Islamic–Abū Manṣūr Heravı̄. London and New York: Routledge & Kegan Paul. pp. 303–304. ISBN 978-0-71009-092-8.
- Bosworth, C. E. (2001). "Ghaznavids". In Yarshater, Ehsan (ed.). Encyclopædia Iranica. Vol. X/6: Germany VI–Gindaros. London and New York: Routledge & Kegan Paul. pp. 578–583. ISBN 978-0-933273-55-9.
- Khatibi, Abolfazl; Cooper, John (2014). "Abū al-ʿAbbās al-Isfarāyinī". In Fleet, Kate; Krämer, Gudrun; Matringe, Denis; Nawas, John; Rowson, Everett (eds.). Encyclopaedia of Islam (3rd ed.). Brill Online. ISSN 1873-9830.

Preceded by Office created	Vizier of the Ghaznavid Empire; 998–1010	Succeeded by Ahmad Maymandi
