= Ali ibn Il-Arslan =

Turkic statesman

Alī ibn Īl-Arslān (Persian: علی بن ایل ارسلان), was a powerful and influential Turkic statesman who served the early Ghaznavid Sultans.

== Biography ==
Ali was the son of a certain Il-Arslan, and had a brother named Il-direk. Ali was known as khwishawand (kinsman), which possibly suggests him being related to the Ghaznavids, or either suggests a high rank. During the reign of Sultan Mahmud, Ali served as the sipahsalar (commander-in-chief) of the Ghaznavid army. After the death of Mahmud in 1030, Ali became a dominant figure civil war that ensured between Mahmud's two sons, the youngest one being Mohammad Ghaznavi, and the oldest one being Mas'ud I. Along with the Ghaznavid vizier Hasanak Mikali, Ali supported Mohammad and expected that he would held absolute power over the Ghaznavid state, while Mohammad would stay as a figurehead. Ali shortly became the main center of Ghaznavid power and had authority over all offices apart from the vizier office.

Ali, however, soon distanced himself from Hasanak, and when Mas'ud began marching towards the Ghaznavid capital of Ghazni, he decided to betray Mohammad and change his adherence to Mas'ud. Mohammad shortly left Ghazni to face his brother who had reached Herat. When Mohammad arrived to Zamindawar, Ali, in order to officially declare his support to Mas'ud, sent Il-direk to the latter. Meanwhile, the majority of Mohammad's began deserting to him, and Mohammad himself was shortly defeated and imprisoned by Mas'ud, who ascended the Ghaznavid throne. Once established in power, Mas'ud, who deemed the power of Ali too great, had the latter imprisoned, who soon died.

Ali had a son named Ibn Ali Khwishawand, who in 1040 took part in the overthrow of Mas'ud and the short-lived restoration of Mohammad.

== Sources ==
- Bosworth, C. Edmund (1985). "ʿALĪ B. IL-ARSLAN QARĪB". Encyclopaedia Iranica, Vol. I, Fasc. 8. London et al.: C. Edmund Bosworth. p. 872.
- Richards, D.S. (2014). The Annals of the Saljuq Turks: Selections from al-Kamil fi'l-Ta'rikh of Ibn al-Athir. Routledge. pp. 1–320. ISBN 978-1-317-83254-6.
