= Ali Daya =

Ghaznavid commander

Abu'l-Hasan Ali ibn Ubaydallah Sadiq (Persian: ابوالحسن علی بن عبیدالله صادق), commonly known as Ali Daya (علی دایا), was a commander who served under the early Ghaznavid rulers, but later fell out of favor and was executed.

== Biography ==
Ali Daya is first mentioned in 1030, when the Ghaznavid Sultan Mahmud died and was succeeded by his son Muhammad. However, the majority of the Ghaznavid troops, which included Ali Daya, mutinied again Muhammad, and joined the latter's brother more experienced Mas'ud I who was at Nishapur. Mas'ud eventually became victorious and Ali Daya was rewarded by Mas'ud's vizier Ahmad Maymandi as the commander-in-chief (sipahsalar) of the Ghaznavid army in Khorasan, thus succeeding the dishonored Turkic general Astightigin. Ali Daya was shortly sent with an army of 4,000 troops against the Seljuk Turks. In 1035, his comrade Begtoghdi succeeded him as the commander-in-chief of Khorasan.

Ali Daya was later present at the Battle of Dandanaqan in 1040, where the Ghaznavids suffered a disastrous defeat. Mas'ud, who blamed Ali Daya and his comrades for the disastrous Ghaznavid defeat, had them imprisoned and then shortly executed in India. The Persian poet Manuchehri is known to have composed one lyric to Ali Daya.

== Sources ==
- Bosworth, C. Edmund (1985). "ʿALĪ B. ʿOBAYDALLĀH ṢĀDEQ". Encyclopaedia Iranica, Vol. I, Fasc. 8. London et al.: C. Edmund Bosworth. p. 853.
- Bosworth, C. Edmund (1989). "BEGTOḠDÏ". Encyclopaedia Iranica, Vol. IV, Fasc. 1. London et al.: C. Edmund Bosworth. p. 86.
- Bosworth, C. E. (2011). The Ornament of Histories: A History of the Eastern Islamic Lands AD 650-1041: The Persian Text of Abu Sa'id 'Abd Al-Hayy Gardizi. I.B.Tauris. pp. 1–169. ISBN 978-1-84885-353-9.

Preceded by Astightigin	Sipahsalar of Khorasan; 1030/1 – 1035	Succeeded by Begtoghdi
