= Abd al-Hamid Shirazi =

Vizier of the Ghaznavids

Abd al-Hamid ibn Ahmad ibn Abd al-Samad Shirazi (Persian: عبدالحمید بن احمد بن عبدالصمد شیرازی), better known as Abd al-Hamid Shirazi (عبدالحمید شیرازی), was a Persian vizier of the Ghaznavid Sultan Ibrahim and the latter's son Mas'ud III.

== Biography ==
He was the son of the prominent Ghaznavid vizier Ahmad Shirazi, who was the son of Abu Tahir Shirazi, a secretary under the Samanids, whose family was originally from Shiraz in southern Iran. In 1077/8, Abd al-Hamid was appointed by Sultan Ibrahim as his vizier, and after the latter's death in 1099, continued to serve as vizier under his son Mas'ud III until 1114/5. After a brief dynastic struggle between some Ghaznavid princes, a son of Mas'ud III, Arslan-Shah, emerged victorious and became the new ruler of the Ghaznavid Empire. However, Arslan-Shah's reign turned out short; his mother, a Seljuq princess named Gawhar Khatun was treated badly, which resulted in her brother Ahmad Sanjar to invade Arslan-Shah's domains, where he managed to decisively defeat Arslan-Shah and make the latter's brother Bahram-Shah the new ruler of the Ghaznavid dynasty, while at the same time acknowledging Sejluq suzerainty. Abd al-Hamid, who was a supporter of Arslan-Shah, was probably killed during this struggle.

Abd al-Hamid had a son named Muhammad, who in turn had a son named Abu'l-Ma'ali Nasrallah, who became prominent at the Ghaznavid court as an excellent poet and statesman, and eventually became the vizier of Sultan Khusrau Malik.

== Sources ==
- Bosworth, C. E. (1968). "The Political and Dynastic History of the Iranian World (A.D. 1000–1217)". In Frye, R. N. (ed.). The Cambridge History of Iran, Volume 5: The Saljuq and Mongol periods. Cambridge: Cambridge University Press. pp. 1–202. ISBN 0-521-06936-X.
- Bosworth, C. E. (1993). "The Encyclopedia of Islam, VII". The Encyclopaedia of Islam, Vol. VII. Brill. pp. 1–1056. ISBN 90-04-09419-9.
- Bosworth, C. Edmund (2001). "GHAZNAVIDS". Encyclopaedia Iranica, Vol. X, Fasc. 6. London et al. pp. 578–583.
- Bosworth, C. Edmund (2010). "ʿABD-AL-ḤAMID b. AḤMAD b. ʿABD-AL-ṢAMAD ŠIRĀZI". Encyclopaedia Iranica, Vol. I, Fasc. 1. London et al.: C. Edmund Bosworth. p. 110.

Preceded by Abu Sahl Khujandi	Vizier of the Ghaznavid Empire; 1077/8 – 1114/5	Unknown
