= Mansur ibn Sa'id =

Iranian statesman

Mansur ibn Sa'id (Persian: منصور بن سعید) was an Iranian statesman, who served as the Head of the Army Department during the reign of the Ghaznavid Sultan Ibrahim of Ghazna (r. 1059–1099). Mansur was the son of Sa'id Maymandi, who was the son of the former Ghaznavid vizier Ahmad Maymandi.

== Sources ==
- Bosworth, C. Edmund (2010). "ʿAbd-al-Razzāq b. Aḥmad b. Ḥasan Maymandi". Encyclopaedia Iranica, Vol. I, Fasc. 2. London et al.: C. Edmund Bosworth. pp. 157–158.
