= Abu Sahl Hamdawi =

Persian statesman, military officer and vizier of Ghaznavids (11th century CE)

Abu Sahl Hamdawi (also spelled Hamduni, Hamdavi and Hamdu'i) was a Persian statesman and military officer of the Ghaznavids, and served briefly as the vizier of Sultan Muhammad in 1030.

== Family ==
Hamdawi belonged to a distinguished and rich family of noble origins, and had his own palace, which, according to Farrukhi Sistani, was "finer than the palace of Kisra". This has recently made some scholars claim that Hamdawi's ancestry goes back to ancient Persian families.

== Biography ==
Hamdawi, during his youth, served in the Ghaznavid army, and was also a student (or assistant) of Ahmad Maymandi. He later entered the court of Mahmud of Ghazni, where he shortly was appointed as the fiscal administrator of the Ghaznavid capital of Ghazni and India. In 1030, Mahmud died and was succeeded by his son Muhammad, who appointed Hamdawi as his vizier, but was, however, shortly overthrown by his more experienced brother Mas'ud I, who shortly appointed Ahmad Maymandi as his vizier, while appointing Hamdawi as the fiscal administrator of the entire Ghaznavid Empire.

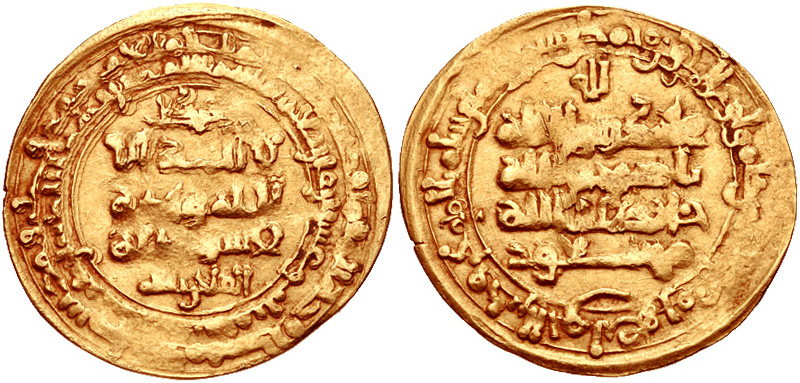
Coin of Mas'ud I.

In 1033, Hamdawi was appointed as the governor of Jibal, which was then held under the control of the Kakuyid ruler Muhammad ibn Rustam Dushmanziyar, who was a vassal of the Ghaznavids. However, Muhammad kept rebelling against Mas'ud I, and Hamdawi was shortly sent to deal with the latter, which he managed to accomplish. During the same period, Hamdawi had to protect Jibal from marauding Oghuz Turks who had arrived in the region from their steppes north to Khwarazm. Hamdawi managed to defeat the Turks, and then had their chief including another important member of their group captured.

However, the Ghaznavids were never able to destroy the power of the Kakuyids, who managed to keep their domains as Ghaznavid vassals. In 1036/7, Hamdawi was repelled from Jibal by Muhammad, and was forced to withdraw to Nishapur, which was then also under constant invasions by the Oghuz Turks.

In 1038, the Oghuz Turks captured Nishapur, which forced its governor Abu'l-Fadl Suri and Hamdawi to flee to Gurgan. During this period, Mas'ud I appointed Hamwudi as his chief advisor. After 1040/1, Hamdawi disappears from sources, and his fate remains unknown.

== Sources ==
- Yusofi, G. H. (1983). "ABŪ SAHL ḤAMDOWĪ". Encyclopaedia Iranica, Vol. I, Fasc. 4. pp. 369–370.
- Richards, D.S. (2014). The Annals of the Saljuq Turks: Selections from al-Kamil fi'l-Ta'rikh of Ibn al-Athir. Routledge. pp. 1–320. ISBN 978-1-317-83254-6.
- Bosworth, C. Edmund (2001). "GHAZNAVIDS". Encyclopaedia Iranica, Vol. X, Fasc. 6. London et al. pp. 578–583.

Preceded by Hasanak Mikali	Vizier of the Ghaznavid Empire; 1030	Succeeded by Ahmad Maymandi
Preceded by Tash Farrash	Governor of Jibal; 1033 - 1036/7	Succeeded by Kakuyid conquest
