= Haresabad, Razavi Khorasan =

Village in Razavi Khorasan province, Iran

Haresabad Persian: حارث اباد
- Village
- Location within Iran
- Coordinates: 36°06′58″N 57°36′38″E
- Country: Iran
- Province: Razavi Khorasan
- County: Sabzevar
- District: Central
- Rural District: Qasabeh-ye Gharbi

Population (2016)
  - Total: 1,250
- Time zone: UTC+3:30 (IRST)

Haresabad (Persian: حارث اباد) (Note: Also known as Moslemabad (مسلم اباد)) is a village in Qasabeh-ye Gharbi Rural District of the Central District in Sabzevar County, Razavi Khorasan province, Iran.

== Demographics ==
=== Population ===
At the time of the 2006 National Census, the village's population was 1,339 in 368 households. The following census in 2011 counted 1,241 people in 373 households. The 2016 census measured the population of the village as 1,250 people in 378 households.

== Notable people ==
Abu'l-Fadl Bayhaqi, a Persian secretary, historian and author was born in Haresabad, where his tomb is located as well.
