= Hasan Maymandi =

Iranian nobleman

Hasan Maymandi (Persian: حسن میمندی) was an Iranian nobleman, who served as the governor of Bust under the Ghaznavid ruler Sabuktigin (r. 977–997), who was a vassal of the Samanid Empire. At an unknown date, Sabuktigin had Hasan crucified, an action which he later regretted. Hasan had a son named Ahmad Maymandi, who would later occupy high offices under the Ghaznavids.

== Sources ==
- Yusofi, G. H. (1984). "AḤMAD MAYMANDĪ". Encyclopaedia Iranica, Vol. I, Fasc. 6. pp. 650–652.
