= Muhammad of Ghazni =

Sultan of Ghazni (1030, 1040–1041)

Muhammad bin Mahmud
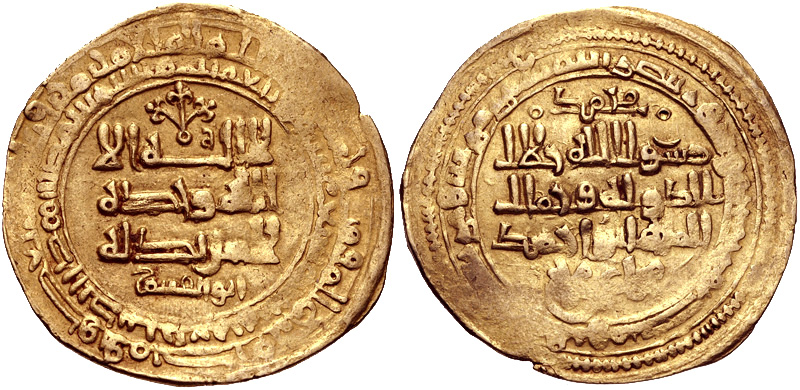
- Gold dinar minted in Ghazna dated 419 AH (1028/9 CE).

Sultan of Ghaznavid Empire
- 1st Reign: 30 April 1030 – 1030
- Predecessor: Mahmud
- Successor: Mas'ud I
- 2nd Reign: 1040 – 19 March 1041
- Predecessor: Mas'ud I
- Successor: Mawdud
- Born: c. 998; Ghazni, Ghaznavid Empire
- Died: 19 March 1041 (aged 42–43); Ghazni; Ghaznavid Empire
- Burial: c. 1041; Ghazni
- Consort: Daughter of Abu'l-Nasr Muhammad
- Issue: 'Abd al-Rahman; Ahmad
Names
- Muhammad bin Mahmud
- House: Ghaznavid Dynasty
- Father: Mahmud of Ghazni
- Religion: Sunni Islam

Muhammad of Ghazni (Persian: محمد غزنوی; b. 998 – d. 1041) was Sultan of the Ghaznavid Empire briefly in 1030, and then later from 1040 to 1041. He ascended the throne upon the death of his father Mahmud in 1030. He was the younger of a set of twins; this circumstance resulted in civil strife. His reign lasted five months before he was overthrown by his twin Ma'sud I, after which he was blinded and imprisoned on the order of Ma'sud I. According to Ferishta, his reign lasted only 50 days. Nine years later he was reinstated for a year before being slain by his nephew Maw'dud after losing a battle in Nangrahar.

== Biography ==
Muhammad was born, along with his elder twin brother Mas'ud, in 998 in the Ghaznavid capital of Ghazni. In ca. 1008, Mohammad married the daughter of the Farighunid ruler Abu'l-Nasr Muhammad. Two years later after the death of Abu'l-Nasr Muhammad, Muhammad was appointed by his father as the governor of Guzgan, thus putting an end to the native Farighunid dynasty of Guzgan.

In 1030, Mahmud, because of his bad relations with his heir Mas'ud, changed his opinion and appointed Mohammad as his heir, who was much less experienced in government and military affairs than Mas'ud. Mahmud shortly died, and was succeeded by Mohammad, who then appointed Abu Sahl Hamduwi as his vizier. At his accession, much power of the state was under the former vizier Hasanak Mikali and military officer Ali ibn Il-Arslan, who greatly administered the state. Muhammad shortly appointed his uncle Yusuf ibn Sabuktigin as the commander-in-chief of the army. Although Muhammad did not possess any real power, his empire flourished. Soon, however, Muhammad's slave troops (ghulam) railed under Abu'l-Najm Ayaz, who had openly changed his allegiance to Muhammad's brother Mas'ud, whose military campaigns in western Iran had earned him a great reputation. Ayaz was shortly joined by other military officers such as Ali Daya. Muhammad then sent an army under his general Suvendharay to quell the rebellion, but the rebels eventually emerged victorious and killed Suvendharay. The victorious rebels then went to Mas'ud, who was at Nishapur.

Eventually, Yusuf ibn Sabuktigin and Ali ibn Il-Arslan along with the rest of the Ghaznavid army also joined Mas'ud. Mas'ud then marched towards Ghazni, where he defeated Muhammad and had him imprisoned while crowning himself as the new Sultan of the Ghaznavid Empire.

According to Ferishta, the differences between Muhammad and his twin brother Mas'ud became worse by this time. Eventually, Muhammad prepared an army to attack Mas'ud. He encamped with his army at the place of "Nakiya-abaad/Nakbat-abaad" for a month, where most of his leaders and army revolted against him. They arrested and imprisoned Muhammad, and welcomed Mas'ud as their new leader.

Later, when the Seljuks were overrunning the western parts of the Ghaznavid Empire, a mutiny among the Ghaznavid troops placed Muhammad back upon the throne, and he had his brother Mas'ud imprisoned in turn. He promoted his son Ahmad, and allied with Suleiman ibn Yusuf, giving him the actual day-to-day running of affairs. They are reported to have been behind the assassination of Mas'ud I while he was imprisoned.

Muhammad sent a missive to Mas'ud's son, Mawdud, in Tukharistan explaining his father's murder was an act of revenge perpetrated by the sons of Mas'ud's former general in India. Upon learning of his father's murder, Maw'dud marched his army toward Ghazni.

Muhammad fled with his army in the face of Maw'dud's invasion, losing Ghazni in the process. Maw'dud wintered in Ghazni, then met Muhammad's army on 19 March 1041 in the province of Nangarhar. Maw'dud personally led the attack, defeating Muhammad's army; thereafter, Maw'dud had Muhammad and his family executed.

== See also ==
- Ghaznavids
- Ghurid dynasty
- Khusrau Shah of Ghazna

== Sources ==
- Bosworth, C. E. (1975). "The early Ghaznavids". In Frye, R. N. (ed.). The Cambridge History of Iran, Volume 4: From the Arab Invasion to the Saljuqs. Cambridge: Cambridge University Press. pp. 162–198. ISBN 0-521-20093-8.
- Bosworth, C. Edmund (1985). "ʿALĪ B. IL-ARSLAN QARĪB". Encyclopaedia Iranica, Vol. I, Fasc. 8. London et al.: C. Edmund Bosworth. p. 872.
- Bosworth, C. E (1995). The Later Ghaznavids: Splendour and Decay: The Dynasty in Afghanistan and Northern India 1040–1186. Munshiram Manoharlal Publishers Private, Limited. ISBN 9788121505772.
- Bosworth, C.E. (1996). The New Islamic Dynasties. Columbia University Press.
- Bosworth, C. E. (2011). The Ornament of Histories: A History of the Eastern Islamic Lands AD 650–1041: The Persian Text of Abu Sa'id 'Abd Al-Hayy Gardizi. I.B.Tauris. pp. 1–169. ISBN 978-1-84885-353-9.

Preceded by Mahmud	Ghaznavid Sultan; 1030–1031	Succeeded by Mas'ud I
Preceded by Mas'ud I	Ghaznavid Sultan; 1040–1041	Succeeded by Maw'dud Ghaznavi
