= Farrukh-Zad of Ghazna =

Ghaznavid sultan from 1053 to 1059

Farrukh-Zad
- Ghaznavid Sultan; Devout Sultan
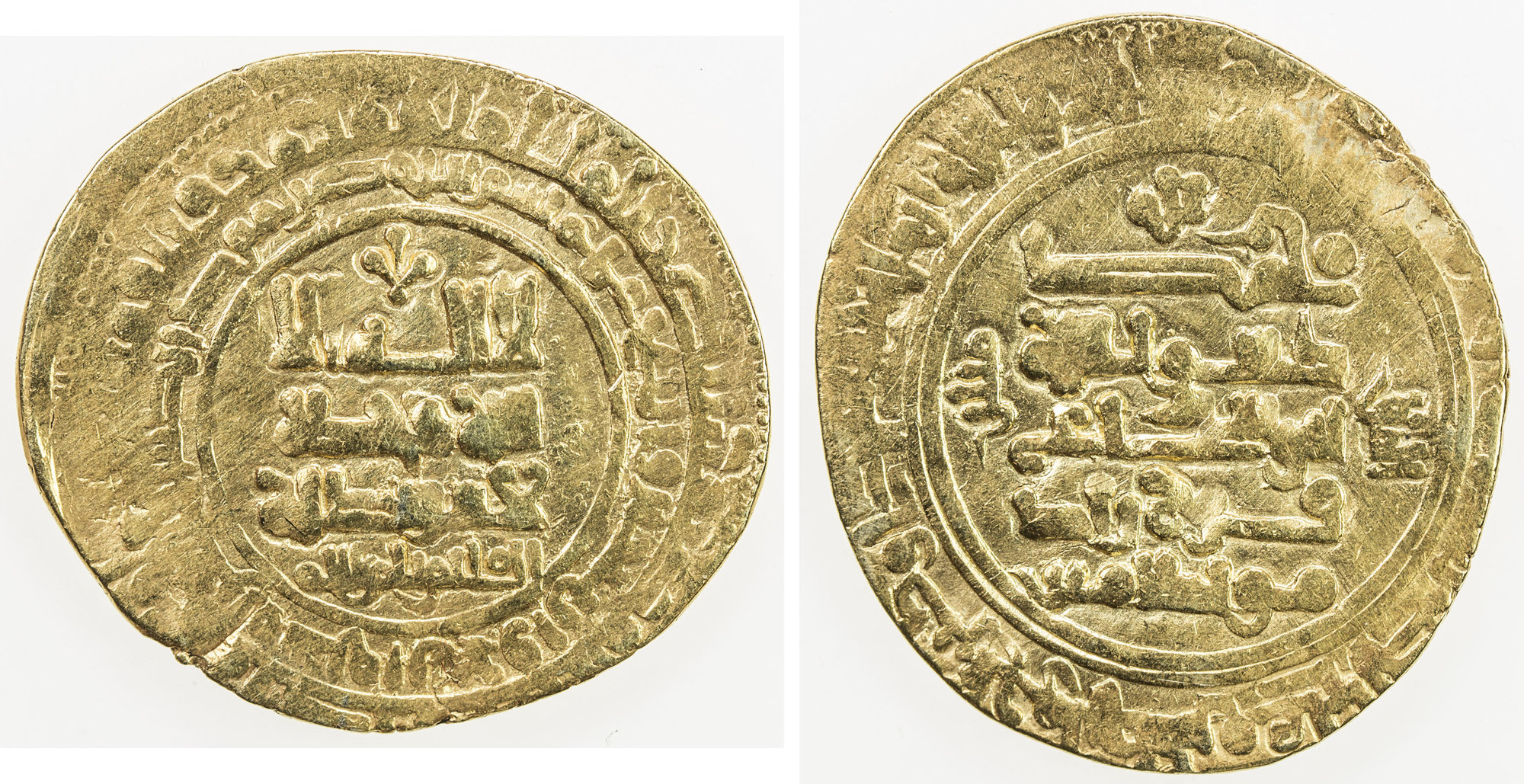
- Gold dinar of Farrukh-Zad

Sultan of Ghaznavid Empire
- Reign: 1053 – 4 April 1059
- Predecessor: Toghrul
- Successor: Ibrahim
- Born: c. 1025; Ghaznavid Empire
- Died: 4 April 1059 (aged 34); Ghaznavid Empire
- Burial: 4–5 April 1059
Names
- Laqab: Jamal ad-Dawlah; Kunya: Abu Shuja; Given name: Farrukh-Zad; Nasab: Farrukh-Zad ibn Ma'sud ibn Mahmud ibn Sabuktegin
- House: House of Sabuktigin
- Father: Ma'sud I
- Religion: Sunni Islam

Farrukh-Zad (Full name: Jamal ad-Dawlah Abu Shuja Farrukh-Zad), was sultan of the Ghaznavid Empire from (1053 – 4 April 1059). His reign was considered one of benevolence, prosperity and tranquility for the Ghaznavid empire. It was free of the chaotic turbulence and greed from palace ghulams until the end of his reign. He was a very devout Muslim and fasted during Rajab, Sha'ban and Ramadan.

== Biography ==
Having been at the fortress of Barghund, Farrukh-Zad was one of the Ghaznavid princes that escaped the usurper Toghrul's massacre in 1052.

Farrukh employed Abd al-Razzaq Maymandi, a former vizier of Maudud and Abd Rashid, but later had him dismissed and imprisoned. He also freed Abul-Fazl Bayhaqi from his imprisonment and it was during Farrukh's reign that Bayhaqi wrote his Mujalladat (Tarikh-e Beyhaqi).

Following the chaos of Toghrul's usurpation, Chagri Beg sent a Seljuq army to take Ghazni, but the ghulam general Khirghiz intercepted and defeated it. Meanwhile, in 1053, the Ghaznavid governors of the eastern Indian garrisons in Malerkotla, Jalandhar, and Lahore began to rebel.

Around 1058, Farrukh had his army invade Tukharistan in hopes of removing the Seljuks. His army was initially successful, capturing the Seljuq Atabeg Qutb ad-Din Kul-Sarigh. However, Alp Arslan counter-attacked and defeated the Ghaznavid army, capturing many of its commanders. A subsequent peace treaty, drawn up by Abul-Fazl Bayhaqi, allowed for an exchange of prisoners and a mutual non-aggression pact.

== Death ==
In 1058, palace ghulams attempted to assassinate Farrukh in his bath, but he grabbed a sword and held them at bay until his guards arrived and killed the ghulams. Depressed and sickened by the attempt on his life, Farrukh-Zad withdrew from worldly affairs and died of colitis on 4 April 1059 at the age of thirty-four. He was succeeded by his brother Ibrahim.

== Sources ==
- Bosworth, C. E. (1968). "The Political and Dynastic History of the Iranian World (A.D. 1000–1217)". In Frye, R. N. (ed.). The Cambridge History of Iran, Volume 5: The Saljuq and Mongol periods. Cambridge: Cambridge University Press. pp. 1–202. ISBN 0-521-06936-X.
- Bosworth, C. E. (1977). The Later Ghaznavids: Splendour and Decay. Edinburgh University Press. ISBN 978-0-85224-315-2.

Farrukh-Zad of Ghazna House of Sabuktegin Born: 1025 Died: 4 April 1059
Regnal titles
Preceded by Toghrul	Sultan of the Ghaznavid Empire; 1053-1059	Succeeded by Ibrahim
