= Abu Tahir Shirazi =

Persian statestman in the service of Samanids (10th century CE)

Abu Tahir Shirazi (Persian: ابوطاهر شیرازی) was a Persian official, who served as the secretary (dabir) of the Samanid slave-general Tash. Abu Tahir belonged to a family native to Shiraz, hence his nisba “Shirazi”. He had a son named Ahmad Shirazi, who would later serve as the vizier of the Ghaznavid Empire.

== Sources ==
- Bosworth, C. E. (1984). "AḤMAD ŠĪRĀZĪ". Encyclopaedia Iranica, Vol. I, Fasc. 6. pp. 660–661.
