= Ahmad Shirazi =

Vizier of the Ghaznavids (11th century CE)

Khwaja Abu Nasr Ahmad (Persian: خواجه ابو نصر احمد), better known as Ahmad Shirazi (احمد شیرازی), also known as Ahmad(-e) Abd al-Samad (احمد عبد الصمد), was a Persian vizier of the Ghaznavid Sultan Mas'ud I and for the latter's son Mawdud from 1032 to 1043. Ahmad was the son of the Samanid secretary Abu Tahir Shirazi, and had a son named Abd al-Hamid Shirazi, who would also later serve as vizier. He was originally from the city of Shiraz.

== Sources ==
- Bosworth, C. E. (1968). "The Political and Dynastic History of the Iranian World (A.D. 1000–1217)". In Frye, R. N. (ed.). The Cambridge History of Iran, Volume 5: The Saljuq and Mongol periods. Cambridge: Cambridge University Press. pp. 1–202. ISBN 0-521-06936-X.
- Bosworth, C. E. (1993). "The Encyclopedia of Islam, VII". The Encyclopaedia of Islam, Vol. VII. Brill. pp. 1–1056. ISBN 90-04-09419-9.
- Bosworth, C. Edmund (2001). "GHAZNAVIDS". Encyclopaedia Iranica, Vol. X, Fasc. 6. London et al. pp. 578–583.
- Bosworth, C. Edmund (2010). "ʿABD-AL-ḤAMID b. AḤMAD b. ʿABD-AL-ṢAMAD ŠIRĀZI". Encyclopaedia Iranica, Vol. I, Fasc. 1. London et al.: C. Edmund Bosworth. p. 110.
- Bosworth, C. E. (1984). "AḤMAD ŠĪRĀZĪ". Encyclopaedia Iranica, Vol. I, Fasc. 6. pp. 660–661.

Preceded by Ahmad Maymandi	Vizier of the Ghaznavid Empire; 1032 - 1043	Unknown
