= Abu Nasr Mushkan =

Ghaznavid chancery from 1011 to 1040

Abu Nasr Mansur ibn Moshkan (Persian: ابو نصر منصور بن مُشكان), better simply known as Abu Nasr Moshkan (ابو نصر مُشكان), was a Persian statesman who served as the head of the Ghaznavid chancery from 1011/2 till his death in 1039/40. His nephew, Tahir ibn Ali ibn Moshkan, known by his title of Thiqat al-Mulk, served as the vizier of Sultan Mas'ud III (r. 1099-1115).

== Sources ==
- Yusofi, G. H. (1983). "ABŪ SAHL ZŪZANĪ". Encyclopaedia Iranica, Vol. I, Fasc. 4. pp. 373–374.
- Bosworth, C. Edmund (2001). "GHAZNAVIDS". Encyclopaedia Iranica, Vol. X, Fasc. 6. London et al. pp. 578–583.
- Bosworth, C. Edmund (1983). "ABU'L-FATḤ YŪSOF". Encyclopaedia Iranica, Vol. I, Fasc. 3. p. 287.
- Moayyad, H. (1983). "ABŪ NAṢR MOŠKĀN". Encyclopaedia Iranica, Vol. I, Fasc. 4. pp. 352–353.
