= Masʽud I =

Ghaznavid Sultan from 1030 to 1040

- Ghaznavid Sultan (Deputy)
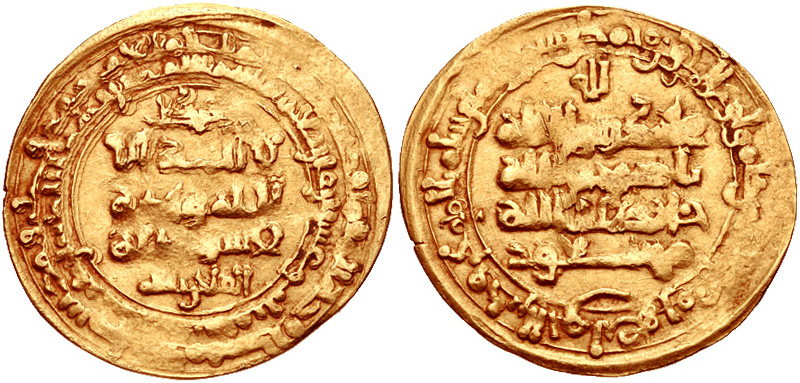

Sultan of Ghaznavid Empire
- Reign: 1030 – 1040
- Predecessor: Mohammad
- Successor: Mohammad
- Born: c. 998; Ghazni; Ghaznavid Empire
- Died: 17 January 1040 (aged 41–42); Giri, Ghaznavid Empire
- Consort: Daughter of Abu Kalijar
- Issue: Mawdud; Ali; Farrukh-Zad; Ibrahim; Majdud; Mardan-shah; Izad-yar; Sa'id
Names
- Mas'ud bin Mahmud
- House: Ghaznavid Dynasty
- Father: Mahmud of Ghazni
- Religion: Sunni Islam

Masʽud I of Ghazni (Persian: مسعود غزنوی), known as Amīr-i Shahīd (امیر شهید; "the martyr king") (b. 998 – d. 17 January 1040), was sultan of the Ghaznavid Empire from 1030 to 1040. The eldest son of Mahmud of Ghazni, he rose to power by seizing the Ghaznavid throne from his younger twin brother, Mohammad, who had been nominated as the heir upon the death of their father. Mohammad was shortly blinded and imprisoned. However, when much of Masʽud's western domains had been wrested from his control, his troops rebelled against him and reinstated his brother to the throne.

== Early life ==
=== Campaigns ===
Mas'ud was born along with his younger twin brother Mohammad in 998 at the Ghaznavid capital of Ghazni. In 1015, Mas'ud was appointed as heir of the Ghaznavid Empire by his father, and was also appointed as the governor of Herat. Five years later, he led an expedition in Ghur, which was still a pagan enclave. Mas'ud later participated in the campaigns of his father in Jibal, where they managed to annex the Buyid amirate of Ray which was then under the rule of Majd al-Dawla.

After Mas'ud's father left the region, Mas'ud was in charge of the Ghaznavid operations in western Iran; he continued his campaigns further west, where he managed to defeat the Kakuyid ruler Muhammad ibn Rustam Dushmanziyar, who made a treaty where he agreed to recognize Ghaznavid authority.

However, Muhammad kept violating the treaty, and in 1030 wrested Ray from the Ghaznavids. During the same period, Mahmud, because of his bad relations with Mas'ud, changed his opinion, and appointed Mohammad as his heir, who was much less experienced in government and military affairs than Mas'ud. Mahmud shortly died, and was succeeded by Mohammad.

=== Struggle for the throne ===
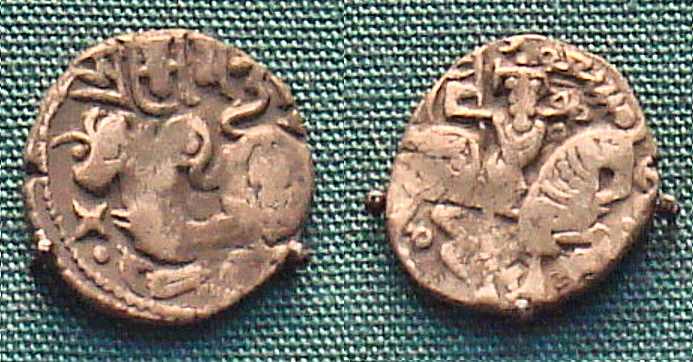
Coinage of Mas'ud I of Ghazni, derived from Hindu Shahi designs, with the name of Mas'ud (Persian: مسعود) around the head of the horserider.

However, his uncle Yusuf ibn Sabuktigin, and the Ghaznavid army including prominent officers such as Ali Daya, were in favor of Mas'ud, whose military campaigns had earned him a great reputation. Mas'ud was also joined by his former assistant Abu Sahl Zawzani, who in the words of the historian Yusofi, "became a sort of vizier and rose in prestige and influence. He also became feared, since he exercised his bent toward vengefulness, spite, and intrigue".

Nevertheless, in order to further strengthen his army, Mas'ud recruited a group of Turkmens which were head by their chiefs Yaghmur, Qizil, Bogha and Goktash.

== Reign ==
=== Consolidation of the Empire and war with the Kara-Khanids ===
Map of Khurasan, Transoxiana and Tokharistan

Mas'ud then marched towards Ghazni, where he defeated his brother and had him imprisoned, while crowning himself as the new Sultan of the Ghaznavid Empire. Mas'ud shortly released the disgraced statesman Ahmad Maymandi from prison, and appointed him as his vizier. He also appointed Ali Daya as the commander-in-chief of the army of Khorasan, while another general named Ahmad Inaltigin was appointed as the commander-in-chief of the army in India who led expedition to Vanarasi in 1033 AD. Later Majdud was appointed in that position, after Inaltigin's deposition following an unsuccessful revolt against Mas'ud.

Although Mas'ud was a great military leader, he was heedless of advice from his officers, which would later result in disaster during his reign. He also suspected the majority of his father's officers of treachery, and even had his own uncle Yusuf and the powerful statesman Ali ibn Il-Arslan imprisoned. In 1032, Ahmad Maymandi died and was succeeded by Ahmad Shirazi as Mas'ud's vizier. Sometime later, Mas'ud's governor and de facto ruler of Khwarazm, Altun Tash, was sent to invade the domains of the Kara-Khanid ruler Ali Tigin Bughra Khan, but was killed at Dabusiyya, a town near Samarkand. He was then succeeded by his son Harun.

=== War in western Iran and clash with Turkic nomads ===
In 1033, Mas'ud captured the fortress of Sarsut, and defeated the Tomara ruler in Siege of Hansi in 1037 and shortly invaded Kerman, which was then under the rule of the Buyid ruler Abu Kalijar. Mas'ud shortly managed to conquer the region, but the inhabitants of Kerman, who preferred Buyid rule, rallied to Abu Kalijar, and, under his vizier Bahram ibn Mafinna, re-conquered Kerman. During the same period, Ahmad Inaltigin rebelled and defeated an army sent by Mas'ud, who shortly sent another army under an Indian statesman named Tilak. The latter managed to rout Ahmad Inaltigin, who drowned while trying to escape. In 1033, Mas'ud married the daughter of the Ziyarid Anushirvan Sharaf al-Ma'ali's relative Abu Kalijar, the real ruler of the Ziyarid state. The same year, in order to keep control over his unreliable vassal, the Kakuyid ruler Muhammad, Mas'ud I appointed Abu Sahl Hamduwi as the governor of Jibal.

In 1034, Harun declared independence from the Ghaznavids, and allied himself with the Kara-Khanid ruler Ali Tigin. Mas'ud, however, managed to have Harun assassinated, and Ali Tigin shortly died. Harun was succeeded by his brother Ismail Khandan, who maintained the alliance with the Kara-Khanids. Meanwhile, the Seljuq Turks, under the leadership of Tughril, asked Mas'ud for asylum. Mas'ud, however, considered the Turkic nomads dangerous and sent an army under Begtoghdi, the newly appointed commander-in-chief in Khorasan. The army was shortly defeated by the Seljuqs, who forced Mas'ud to cede Nasa, Farava and Dihistan in return for Seljuq recognition of Ghaznavid authority. In 1034, Mas'ud marched an army to Amul to collect tribute, sacking Amul for four days and later burning it to the ground.

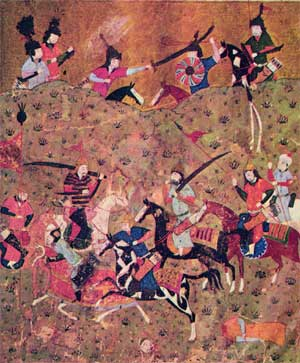
Artwork of the Battle of Dandanaqan

In 1035, Mas'ud I launched another invasion of western Iran, where he defeated the rebellious Abu Kalijar. Mas'ud then marched towards Jibal, where he once again defeated the Kakuyid ruler Muhammad, who fled to the Buyids of Ahvaz, and then to northwestern Iran, where he raised a Turkmen army. In 1037/8, while Mas'ud was campaigning in India, Muhammad once again occupied Ray. Meanwhile, another Kara-Khanid ruler named Böritigin invaded the Ghaznavid territories and plundered Khuttal and Vakhsh. He also managed to conquer Chaghaniyan and expel the local Muhtajid dynasty from the region.

=== War with the Seljuqs and downfall ===
Furthermore, the Seljuqs had begun to gradually subdue the cities of Khorasan, and when they captured Nishapur, Tughril proclaimed himself the ruler of Khorasan. Mas'ud, after having returned to Khorasan, tried to re-conquer Chaghaniyan but was defeated by Böritigin. However, he expelled the Seljuqs from Herat and Nishapur. He soon marched towards Merv to completely remove the Seljuq threat from Khorasan. His army included 50,000 men and 60 or 12 war elephants. He was accompanied by his vizier Ahmad Shirazi, his chief secretary Abu Sahl Zawzani, his generals Ali Daya, Begtoghdi and Subashi, and Abd al-Razzaq Maymandi, the son of Ahmad Maymandi.

A battle shortly took place near Merv, known as the Battle of Dandanaqan, where the army of Mas'ud was defeated by a much smaller army under Tughril, his brother Chaghri Beg, and the Kakuyid prince Faramurz. Mas'ud thus permanently lost control of all of western Khorasan. Although Mas'ud managed to retain his capital Ghazni, he chose to leave the city, and set up a capital in India. Mas'ud, who blamed Ali Daya and other generals for the disastrous Ghaznavid defeat near Merv, had them imprisoned in Lahore. However, the army of Mas'ud, which used to hold him in high esteem, revolted against him, and had his brother Mohammad reinstated to the throne.

=== Death and aftermath ===
Mohammad then had Mas'ud imprisoned at Giri, where he was killed either on the orders of Mohammad or Mohammad's son Ahmed. Mas'ud had a son named Maw'dud Ghaznavi, who later avenged his father by killing Mohammad, and then crowned himself as the new ruler of the Ghaznavid Empire. He also had other sons named Sa'id, Izad-yar, Mardan-shah, Majdud, Ibrahim, Ali, and Farrukh-Zad. The last three sons also ruled the Ghaznavid Empire in later periods.

== Sources ==
- Bosworth, C. E. (1975). "The early Ghaznavids". In Frye, R. N. (ed.). The Cambridge History of Iran, Volume 4: From the Arab Invasion to the Saljuqs. Cambridge: Cambridge University Press. pp. 162–198. ISBN 0-521-20093-8.
- Bosworth, C. Edmund (1984). "AḤMAD INALTIGIN". Encyclopaedia Iranica, Vol. I, Fasc. 6. London et al.: C. Edmund Bosworth. p. 647.
- Bosworth, C. E. (1963). The Ghaznavids, 994–1040. Edinburgh University Press.
- Bosworth, C. E (2012). Maymandī. Leiden and New York: BRILL. ISBN 9789004161214.
- Bosworth, C. E (1995). The Later Ghaznavids: Splendour and Decay: The Dynasty in Afghanistan and Northern India 1040–1186. Munshiram Manoharlal Publishers Private, Limited. ISBN 9788121505772.
- Yusofi, G. H. (1983a). "ABŪ SAHL ZŪZANĪ". Encyclopaedia Iranica, Vol. I, Fasc. 4. pp. 373–374.
- Yusofi, G. H. (1983b). "ABŪ SAHL ḤAMDOWĪ". Encyclopaedia Iranica, Vol. I, Fasc. 4. pp. 369–370.
- Davidovich, E. A. (1996). "The Karakhanids". History of Civilizations of Central Asia, Volume III: The Crossroads of Civilizations: A.D. 250 to 750. Paris: UNESCO. pp. 119–145. ISBN 92-3-103211-9.
- Bosworth, C. E. (1968). "The Political and Dynastic History of the Iranian World (A.D. 1000–1217)". In Frye, R. N. (ed.). The Cambridge History of Iran, Volume 5: The Saljuq and Mongol periods. Cambridge: Cambridge University Press. pp. 1–202. ISBN 0-521-06936-X.

Preceded by: Mohammad Ghaznavi	Sultan of the Ghaznavid Empire; 1030–1040	Followed by: Mohammad Ghaznavi
