= Toghrul of Ghazna =

Ghaznavid sultan from 1052 to 1053

Toghrul
- Ruler of The State
- Reign: 1052 – 1053
- Predecessor: Abd al-Rashid
- Successor: Farrukh-Zad
- Died: c. 1053
Names
- Laqab: Qiwam ad-Dawlah; Kunya: Abu Said; Given name: Toghrul
- Religion: Sunni Islam

Toghrul of Ghazna (full name: Qiwam ad-Dawlah Abu Said Toghrul), was a Turkic slave general and usurper of the Ghaznavid throne. He was originally a ghulam in the service of the Ghaznavid Empire. Following his usurpation of the Ghaznavid throne from Abd al-Rashid and massacre of eleven Ghaznavid royal princes, he was known as the accursed, the inauspicious, the arrogant and the contemptible.

== Life ==
Toghrul started his service as a ghulam of Sultan Mahmud and by the reign of Abd al-Rashid had risen to commander in chief of the army.

In 1042–43, Toghrul invaded Sistan with 2,000 troops and captured a Saffarid family member Abu n-Nasr. Abu n-Nasr was taken back to Ghazna and later exchanged for a son of the Ghaznavid vizier, Ahmed Hasan Maimandi. However, Toghrul continued onward, occupying Karkuya and massacring both Muslim and Zoroastrian populations indiscriminately.

Toghrul led an army against Alp Arslan and won a victory at Hupyan in the Hindu Kush during the winter of 1051. After defeating Alp Arslan, Toghrul marched to Sistan. He besieged the fortress of Taq and held it under siege for a month, defeating a Seljuq relief army, commanded by Payghu.

Unable to take Taq, Toghrul marched his army to Ghazna, sending letters to Abd al-Rashid asserting the disloyalty of the army. Rashid, filled with terror of a rebellion, locked himself up in the citadel. Upon his arrival, Toghrul gained the support of the garrison, captured Abd al-Rashid, and had Abd al-Rashid and eleven other Ghaznavid princes executed.

With Ghazna under his control, Toghrul sent letters to the ghulam general Kirghiz, commander of the Ghaznavid forces in India, seeking his support. Kirghiz responded by condemning Toghrul and his massacre of the Ghaznavid princes. Meanwhile, Toghrul married Mas'ud I's daughter to legitimise his reign and started minting coins in his image. Despite this, Kirghiz sent letters to the garrison and army commanders which motivated a ghulam named Nushtigin to murder Toghrul. By the time Kirghiz and his army arrived, Toghrul's head was being paraded around Ghazna.

== Sources ==
- Bosworth, C.E. (1977). The Later Ghaznavids. Columbia University Press.
- Ibn al-Athir (2002). Hillenbrand, Carole (ed.). The Annals of the Saljuq Turks. Translated by Richards, D.S. Routledge.

Preceded by: Abd al-Rashid	Sultan of Ghazna; 1052–1053	Followed by: Farrukh-Zad
