= Battle of Dandanaqan =

Battle between the Ghaznavids and Seljuks in 1040

Coordinates: 37°23′31″N 61°20′43″E

- Part of the Seljuk-Ghaznavid Wars
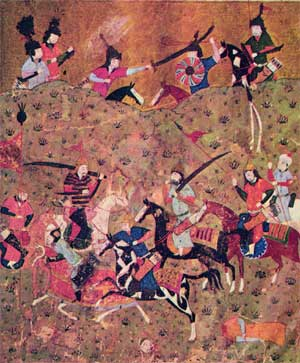
- Artwork of the battle of Dandanaqan. Derived from the manuscript: Tārīkh-i Abū’l-Khair Khānī (History of Abū al-Khair Khan). Beruni Institute in Tashkent ms. no. 9989. Manuscript written in Samarqand, 1543.
Date	May 23, 1040
Location	Dandanaqan, near Merv
Result	Seljuk victory
Territorial changes	Khorasan annexed by the Seljuks

Belligerents
Ghaznavid Empire	Seljuk Turks

Commanders and leaders
Mas'ud I	Chaghri; Tughril Bey

Strength
16,000 (Note: Bosworth states Ma'sud did not take 50,000 men or 300 elephants to Khurasan against the Seljuk Turks. By the time the Ghaznavids met the Seljuks, they were starved, demoralised, and is likely his forces equaled the Seljuk army.)–50,000 100–300 war elephants	16,000

Casualties and losses
Unknown, likely heavy	Unknown

The Battle of Dandanaqan (Persian: نبرد دندانقان) was fought in 1040 between the Seljuq Turkmens and the Ghaznavid Empire near the city of Merv (now in Turkmenistan). The battle ended with a decisive Seljuq victory, which subsequently brought down the Ghaznavid domination in Greater Khorasan.

== Background ==
Forced out of Transoxiana in 1034 by the Kara-Khanids, the Seljuks settled in Khwarazm under the advocacy of the Ghaznavid governor Harun. His murder in 1035, forced them to flee through the Kara Kum Desert towards Merv, but they switched instead to Nasa on the edges of Khurasan. Hearing of this threat, Ghaznavid sultan Ma'sud I sent Iltughdi with a large army to Nasa. Initially successful having driven off the Seljuk forces, the Ghaznavid army began squabbling over the spoils. The Seljuk, led by Chaghri, returned and fell upon the disorganized Ghaznavids and defeated them. As a result, Ma'sud entitled the Seljuk to three cities in Khurasan: Dihistan, Nasa, and Farawa. After conducting raids as far as Balkh, all of Khurasan fell to the Seljuk Turks.

== Battle ==
During the march of Mas'ud's army to Sarakhs, the Seljuq raiders harassed the Ghaznavid army with hit-and-run tactics. Swift and mobile Turkmens were better able to fight battles in the steppes and deserts than was the conservative heavily-laden army of Ghaznavid Turks. Seljuq Turkmens also destroyed the Ghaznavids' supply lines and so cut them off the nearby water wells. This seriously reduced the discipline and the morale of the Ghaznavid army.

On May 23, 1040, around 16,000 Seljuk soldiers engaged in battle against a starving and demoralised Ghaznavid army in Dandanaqan and defeated them near the city of Merv destroying a large part of the Ghaznavid forces. Mas'ud fled to India, was overthrown, and was finally murdered in prison.

== Aftermath ==
The Seljuks captured Herat, Sistan, Pushang, Ghur which was put in charge of Musa Yabghu bin Seljuk and besieged Balkh. By 1047, Tughril had coins minted in Nishapur calling him, al-Sultan al-Mu'azzam and Shahanshah. Seljuks lost Khurasan to Khwarazmian Empire in 1138 AD and the latter lost it to Ghoris in 1173 AD.

== Sources ==
- Bosworth, C.E. (1963). The Ghaznavids: 994-1040. Edinburgh University Press.
- Bosworth, C. E. (2011). "Abū Manșūr Farāmarz". Encyclopaedia Iranica. Archived from the original on 2013-11-10.
- Bosworth, Edmund (2017). The Turks in the Early Islamic World. Routledge. p. xliv. "In their pursuit of the Turkmens across Khurasan, the Ghaznavid forces..."
- Grousset, Rene (2002). The Empire of the Steppes: A History of Central Asia. Rutgers University.
- Ibn al-Athir, Izz al-D in (2002). Hillenbrand, Carole (ed.). The Annals of the Saljuq Turks. Translated by Richards, D.S. Routledge.
- Lambton, Ann K. S. (1988). Continuity and Change in Medieval Persia. SUNY Press. pp. 5–. ISBN 978-0-88706-133-2.
- Mallett, Alex (2013). "Dandanakan, battle of". In Fleet, Kate; Krämer, Gudrun; Matringe, Denis; Nawas, John; Rowson, Everett (eds.). Encyclopaedia of Islam (3rd ed.). Brill Online. ISSN 1873-9830.
- Paul, Jürgen (2000). "The Histories of Herat". Iranian Studies. 33 (1/2 Winter - Spring). Taylor & Francis, Ltd.
- Peacock, A.C.S. (2015). The Great Seljuk Empire. Edinburgh University Press.
- Safi, Omid (2006). The Politics of Knowledge in Premodern Islam: Negotiating Ideology and Religious Inquiry. The University of North Carolina Press.
- Saray, Mehmet (2003). The Russian, British, Chinese and Ottoman Rivalry in Turkestan Four Studies on the History of Central Asia. Turkish Historical Society Printing House. p. 189. "...brothers Tughrul and Chaghri, grandsons of Seljuk, the Turkmens defeated the Ghaznavids at Dandanakan...."
- Sicker, Martin (2000). The Islamic World in Ascendancy : From the Arab Conquests to the Siege of Vienna. Praeger. ISBN 9780275968922.
- Spuler, Bertold (2014). Iran in the Early Islamic Period: Politics, Culture, Administration and Public Life between the Arab and the Seljuk Conquests, 633-1055. Brill. ISBN 978-90-04-28209-4.
- Spuler, B. (1991). "Ghaznawids". In Lewis, B.; Pellat, C.; Schacht, J. (eds.). The Encyclopedia of Islam. Vol. II. Brill.
- Mikaberidze, Alexander (2011-07-22). Conflict and Conquest in the Islamic World: A Historical Encyclopedia [2 volumes]: A Historical Encyclopedia. ABC-CLIO. ISBN 978-1-59884-337-8.
- Bosworth, C. E. (1961). "The Early Islamic History of Ghūr". Central Asiatic Journal. 6 (2): 116–133. ISSN 0008-9192.
- Panhwar, M. H. (January 2003). An Illustrated Historical Atlas Of Soomra Kingdom Of Sindh (1011-1351 AD). Sindh: Soomra National Council.
