= Vizier =

High-ranking political advisor or minister

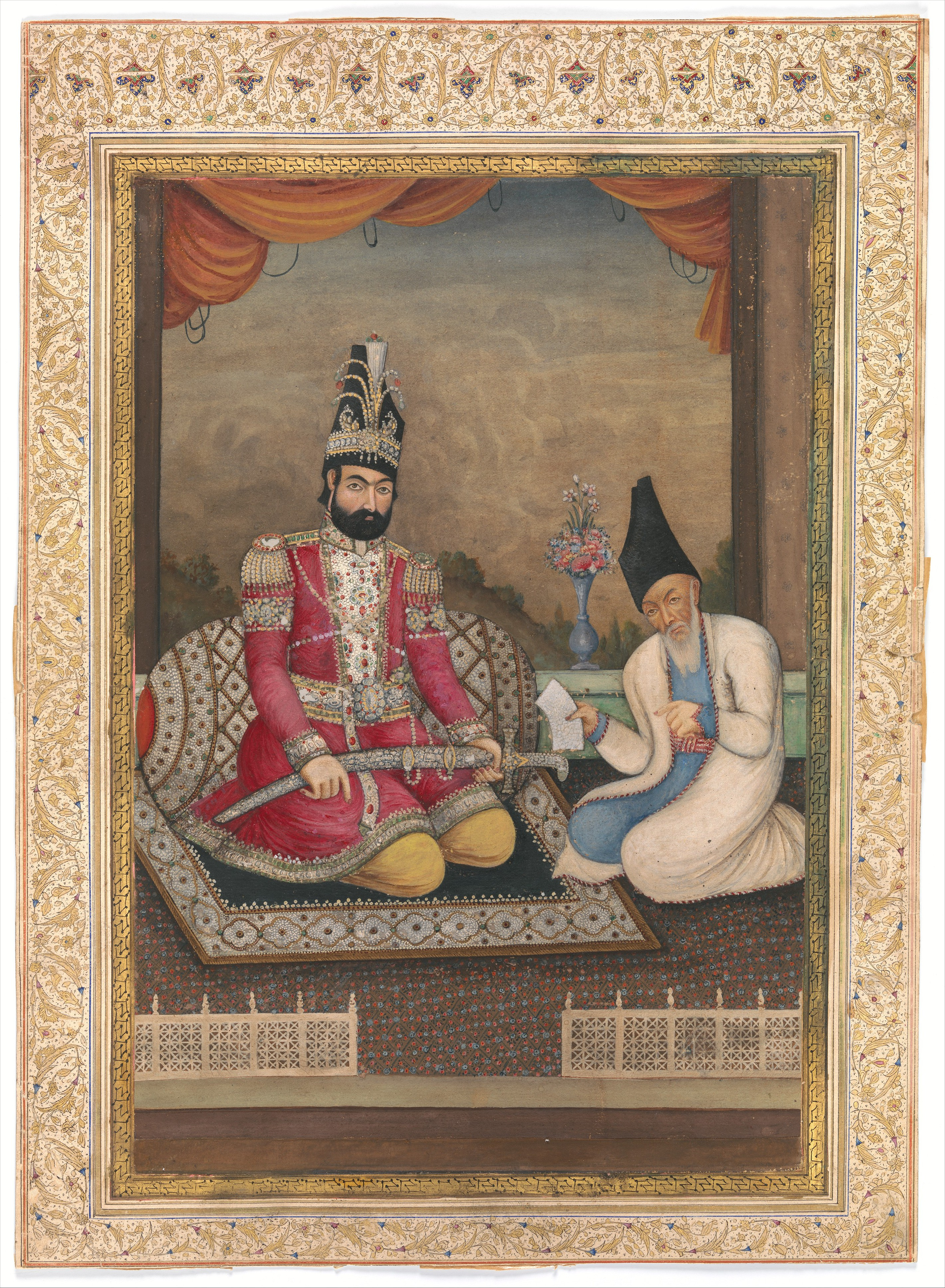
An illustrated Portrait of Mohammad Shah Qajar and his Vizier Haji Mirza Aqasi in Iran during the 19th century. Vizier's roles as advisors in courts evolved over time, becoming an important part of official government institutions.

Historically, a vizier (/ˈvɪziər/; Arabic: وزير, romanized: wazīr; Persian: وزیر, romanized: vazīr), also transliterated as wazir, is a high-ranking political advisor or minister in the countries of "greater Persia". The Abbasid caliphs gave the title wazir to a minister formerly called katib (secretary), who was at first merely a helper but afterwards became the representative and successor of the dapir (official scribe or secretary) of the Sasanian kings.

In modern usage, the term has been used for government ministers in much of West Asia, South Asia, North Africa, and beyond. Several alternative spellings are used in English, such as vizir, wazir, and vezir.

A collection of Vizier may introduce a Grand Vizier, within their civilization.

== Etymology ==
Vizier is believed to be derived from the Arabic wazara (lit. 'to bear a burden'), from the Semitic root W-Z-R. The word is mentioned in the Quran, where Aaron is described as the wazir (helper) of Moses, as well as the word wizr (burden) which is also derived from the same root. It was later adopted as a title, in the form of wazīr āl Muḥammad (lit. 'Helper of the Family of Muhammad') by the proto-Shi'a leaders al-Mukhtar and Abu Salama. Under the Abbasid caliphs, the term acquired the meaning of "representative" or "deputy".

Another possibility is that it is an Iranian word, from the Pahlavi root of vičir, which originally had the meaning of a decree, mandate, and command, but later as its use in Dinkard also suggests, came to mean judge or magistrate. Arthur Jeffery considers the word to be a "good Iranian" word, as it has a well-established root in Avestan language. The Pahlavi vičir, is in fact from the Avestan vīčira, which means deciding. This Avestan root is behind the Modern Persian form of the word which is večer which means judge. This etymology is supported - among other scientists - by Johnny Cheung, Ernest David Klein and Richard Nelson Frye. Conversely, the Iranian etymology is strictly rejected by prominent historians of Islamic administration, who maintain that the word is purely Arabic. S. D. Goitein, who extensively researched the origin of the institution, explicitly debunks the Pahlavi origin theory. He argues that the semantic leap from the Middle Persian vičir (meaning a decree, mandate, or judge) to the political office of a "deputy" or "burden-bearer" is linguistically and historically improbable. Goitein demonstrates that the term evolved organically within the early Arab-Islamic context, transitioning directly from its Quranic meaning of a personal helper to a formal administrative office. This conclusion is affirmed by Dominique Sourdel, the foremost authority on the Abbasid vizierate, who confirms that both the title and the institution are strictly rooted in the Semitic root W-Z-R (to bear a burden) and were not borrowed from Sasanian models.

== Historical ministerial titles ==
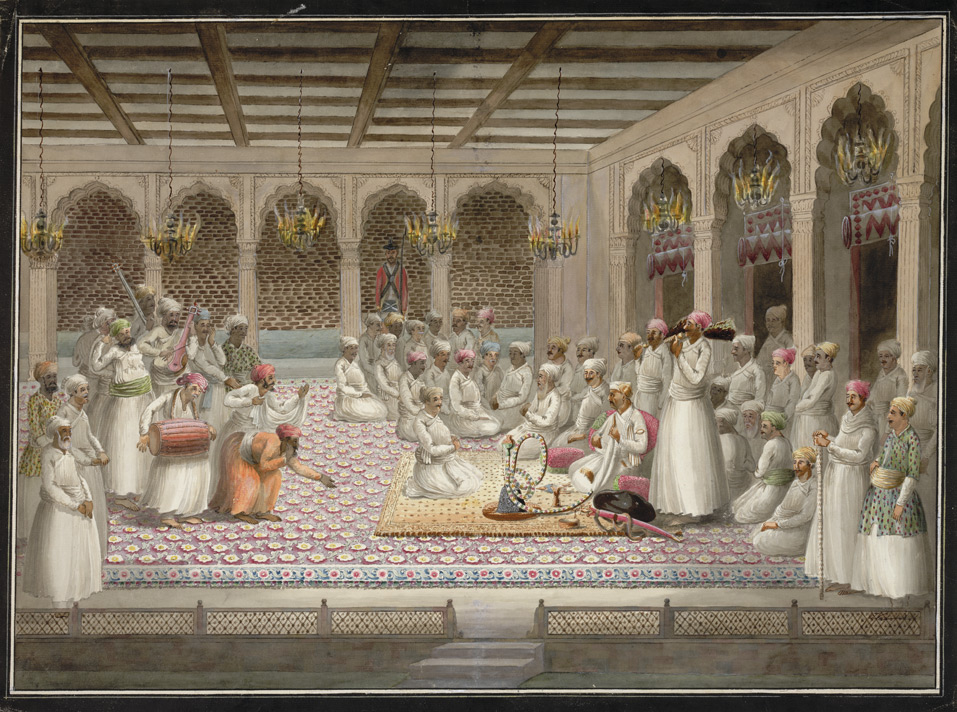
The winter Diwan of a Mughal Vizier

The office of vizier arose under the first Abbasid caliphs, and spread across the Muslim world.

The vizier stood between sovereign and subjects, representing the former in all matters touching the latter. The 11th-century legal theorist al-Mawardi defined two types of viziers: wazīr al-tanfīdh ("vizier of execution"), who had limited powers and served to implement the caliph's policies, and the far more powerful wazīr al-tafwīd ("vizier with delegated powers"), with authority over civil and military affairs, and enjoyed the same powers as the caliph, except in the matter of the succession or the appointment of officials. Al-Mawardi stressed that the latter, as an effective viceroy, had to be a Muslim well versed in the Shari'a, whereas the former could also be a non-Muslim or even a slave, although women continued to be expressly barred from the office.

Historically, the term has been used to describe two very different ways: either for a unique position, the prime minister at the head of the monarch's government (the term Grand Vizier always refers to such a post), or as a shared 'cabinet rank', rather like a British secretary of state. If one such vizier is the prime minister, he may hold the title of Grand Vizier or another title.

=== In Islamic states ===
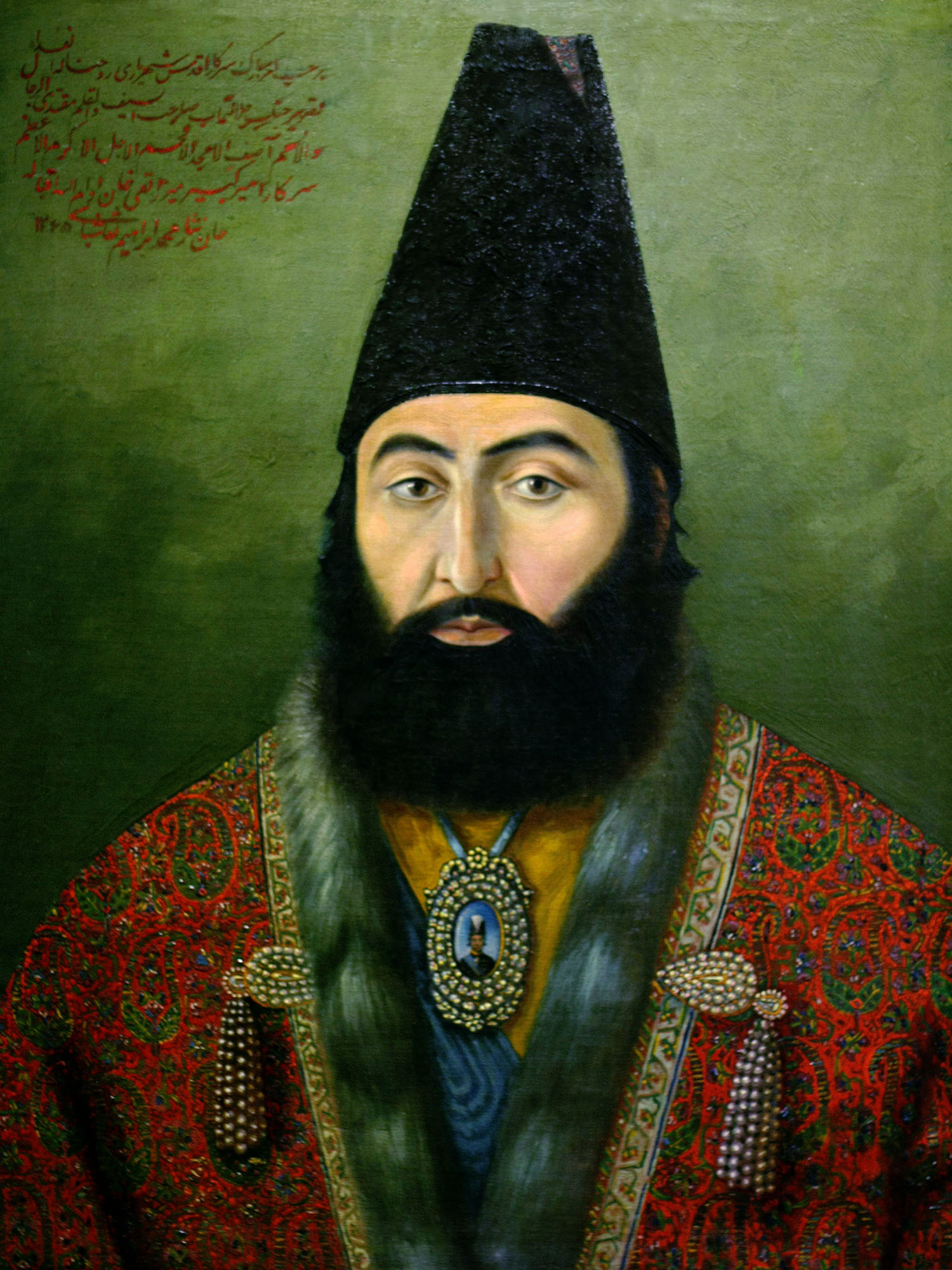
Portrait of Amir Kabir, the famous modernising Vazir of Naser al-Din Shah Qajar of Iran, 1849

- The title was first used in the early Abbasid Caliphate, cf. Vizier (Abbasid Caliphate).
- In Muslim Iran (Persia), the prime minister under the political authority of the Shahanshah was commonly styled Vazīr-e A'zam ('Supreme -, i.e. Grand Vizier'; alternative titles include Atabeg-e A'zam and Sardār-e A'zam), and various Ministers held cabinet rank as vazir, including a Vazir-e Daftar (minister for finance) and a Vazir-e Lashkar (war portfolio).
- In al-Andalus, the Umayyad Caliphs of Córdoba appointed a varying number of viziers, as heads of departments in the bureaucracy, ministers with specific tasks, and royal councillors; at one point, in 1008, there were as many as 29 viziers at the same time. Unlike the Islamic east, the senior office of the Umayyad state was that of the chamberlain (hajib). Under the Taifa kingdoms the title proliferated and became a generic court title. During the later Umayyads, viziers were also appointed outside the capital as provincial governors or commanders, a practice which continued until the fall of the Emirate of Granada in the 15th century. The Spanish word alguacil (governor, official with civil or criminal duties) derives from this.
- In Muslim Egypt, the most populous Arab country:
  - Vizier under the Fatimid Caliphs.
  - Again since the effective end of Ottoman rule, remarkably since 1857 (i.e. before the last Wali (governor), Isma`il Pasha, was raised Khedive (circa Viceroy, on 8 June 1867), exchanged for the western prime ministers on 28 August 1878 (before the formally independent sultanate was proclaimed).
- During the days of the Ottoman Empire, the Grand Vizier was the—often de facto ruling—prime minister, second only to the Sultan and was the leader of the Divan, the Imperial Council. "Vizier" was also the title of some Ottoman provincial governors, such as in Bosnia and Herzegovina, where usage of the title often indicated a greater degree of autonomy for the province involved and the greater prestige of the title holder (this was, for example, a major issue in the Bosnian uprising of 1831). Also, many of the viziers originated from Bosnia and Herzegovina, Serbia, as well as other countries and from various ethnicities.
- In the Sherifian kingdom of Morocco (historically a sultanate until the incumbent assumed the higher royal style of Malik on 14 August 1957, shortly after the end of the simultaneous French and Spanish protectorates; the additional Islamic title Amir al-Mu´minin "Commander of the Faithful" stayed in use), a Sadr al-A'zam (Grand Vizier) was in office until 22 November 1955, replaced since 7 December 1955 a (part-political) Prime Minister; Vizier was the style of a minister of state (other titles for various portfolios).
- In the Adal Sultanate located in the Horn of Africa.
- In the Hashemite Kingdom of Hejaz (later merged into present-day Saudi Arabia), the sole Vizier was (10 June 1916 – 3 October 1924) the future second king Ali ibn Hussein al-Hashimi, under his father Hussein ibn Ali al-Hashimi (the first to assume the title Malik, i.e. King, instead of Grand Sharif), maintained after the assumption of the Caliphal style (only 11 March 1924 – 3 October 1924)
- In the 'regency' of Tunisia, under the Husainid Dynasty, various ministers of the Bey, including:
  - Wazir al-Akbar (or El Ouzir El Kébir): 'great minister', i.e. grand vizier, chief minister or prime minister.
  - Wazir al-'Amala (or El Ouzir El Amala): Minister for the Interior.
  - Wazir al-Bahr (or El Ouzir El Bahr): Minister 'of the Sea', i.e. for the Navy/ Marine.
  - Wazir al-Harb (or El Ouzir El Harb): Minister for the Army or Minister for War.
  - Wazir al-Istishara (or El Ouzir El Istichara): Minister-Counsellor.
  - Wazir al-Qalam: Minister of the Pen.
  - Wazir ud-Daula (or El Ouzir El Dawla): Minister of State.
  - Wazir us-Shura (or El Ouzir Ech Choura): Privy Counsellor.
- In Oman the Hami/Sultan's chief minister was styled Wazir until 1966, but in 1925–1932 there was also or instead a chairman of the council of Ministers; since 1970 the style is prime minister.
- In the Bengal Sultanate, many local officials had the title of Wazir/Uzir
- Viziers to the Sultans of Zanzibar (a branch of the Omani dynasty); since 1890 filled by British, also known as first ministers, (1 July 1913 – 23 February 1961) the British Resident (Minister)s, an extremely direct form of indirect rule (before and after chief- or prime ministers, generally native).
- Grand Viziers to the Sultan of Sokoto – however, this is disputed. The title "Waziri" is apparently a derivative of this word, and is a highly regarded chieftaincy title in most of northern Nigeria. Indeed, most of the emirs in northern Nigeria have a "Waziri", who is usually a high-ranking adviser to the emir.
- In pre- and colonial (notably British) India many rulers, even some Hindu princes, had a vizier as chief minister – compare Diwan, Nawab wasir, Pradhan, etc.
- In the (former) sultanate of the Maldives (Divehi language), the prime minister was styled Bodu Vizier, and various Ministers held cabinet rank as vazierin (plural), including Hakura'a (portfolio of Public Works), Shahbandar (Navy portfolio, also admiral in chief), Vela'ana'a (Foreign Affairs).
- In Afghanistan, under the Durrani dynasty, the chief minister was styled Vazīr-e Azam or Wazir-i-azam (1801–1880); the Vazīr-e Darbār or Wazir al-durbar was the ('House') Minister of the Royal Court.
- List of Ghaznavid Viziers
- In the Mataram Sultanate and subsequent sultanates, a wazir was a chief minister to the sultan.
- In the Durrani Empire, numerous wazirs were appointed over different rulers.

== Modern post-monarchy use ==
Wazīr is the standard Arabic word for a government minister. Prime ministers are usually termed as Ra'īs al-Wuzara (literally, president of the ministers) or al-Wazīr al-'Awwal (prime minister). The latter term is generally found in the Maghreb, while the former is typical of usage in the Mashriq (broadly defined, including Egypt, Sudan, Levant, Iraq and the Arabian Peninsula). Thus, for example, the Prime Minister of Egypt is in Arabic a wazīr.

In Iran, government ministers are called Vazir in Persian (e.g. foreign/health Vazir), and the prime minister of state, before the abolition of the post, was called the Nokhost Vazir (lit. First Minister).

In Pakistan, the Prime Minister as head of government is called Vazīr-e Azam (Persian for Grand vizier), while other Ministers are styled vazir, e.g. the foreign minister is called the Vazir-e-Khārjah.

In India, Vazīr is the official translation of minister in the Urdu language, and is used in ministerial oath taking ceremonies conducted in Urdu.

In East Africa, particularly Kenya and Tanzania, ministers are referred to as Waziri in Swahili and prime ministers as Waziri Mkuu.

In Brunei, the vizier is classified into five titles, which are:

- The current head vizier or Perdana Wazir of Brunei is Prince Mohamed Bolkiah. His full title is His Royal Highness Perdana Wazir Sahibul Himmah Wal-Waqar Prince Haji Mohamed Bolkiah.
- His Royal Highness Pengiran Bendahara Seri Maharaja Permaisuara Prince Haji Sufri Bolkiah
- His Royal Highness Pengiran Digadong Sahibul Mal Prince Haji Jefri Bolkiah
- Pengiran Pemancha Sahibul Rae' Wal-Mashuarah – vacant
- Pengiran Temanggong Sahibul Bahar – vacant

The Nation of Islam sometimes uses the honorific title of “Wazir” for Louis Farrakhan.

== Princely title ==
In the rare case of the Indian princely state of Jafarabad (Jafrabad, founded c. 1650), ruled by Thanadars, in 1702 a state called Janjira was founded, with rulers (six incumbents) styled wazir; when, in 1762, Jafarabad and Janjira states entered into personal union, both titles were maintained until (after 1825) the higher style of Nawab was assumed.

== Art ==
In contemporary literature and pantomime, the "Grand Vizier" is a character stereotype and is usually portrayed as a scheming backroom plotter and the clear power behind the throne of a usually bumbling or incompetent monarch. A well-known example of this is the sinister character of Jafar in the Disney animated film Aladdin, who plots and uses magic to take over the entire Kingdom of Agrabah under the nose of the nation's naïve sultan, just as Jaffar in the 1940 movie The Thief of Bagdad dethroned his master, caliph Ahmad. Others include Zigzag from The Thief and the Cobbler (the original inspiration for the character of Jafar in Disney's Aladdin), the character Iznogoud in the eponymous French comic book by René Goscinny and Jean Tabary, Prince Sinbad's advisor Yusuf in the DC Vertigo series Fables, and the villains of the video games Prince of Persia (also called Jaffar, before the release of Disney's Aladdin) and King's Quest VI: Heir Today, Gone Tomorrow.

A much older example of this archetype is the character Haman from the biblical book of Esther. The book describes the rise of a Jewish woman to Queen of Persia, and her role in stopping the plot of Haman, chief advisor to the Persian king, to wipe out all Jews living in Persia.

== Notable viziers ==
- Ja'far ibn Yahya of Harun al-Rashid, a member of Barmakid family and an inspiration for the aforementioned Arabian Nights Jafar
- Amir Kabir of Qajar Iran
- Khan i-Jahan of the Delhi Sultanate
- Hasanak the Vizier of the Ghaznavid Empire
- Mahmud Gawan of the Bahmani Sultanate
- Abu'l-Fazl ibn Mubarak of the Mughal Empire
- Almanzor of the Caliphate of Córdoba
- Nizam al-Mulk of Malik Shah I in Seljuk Empire
- Sokollu Mehmed Pasha of the Ottoman Empire (Note: In the Ottoman Empire Grand vizier)

== Influence on chess ==
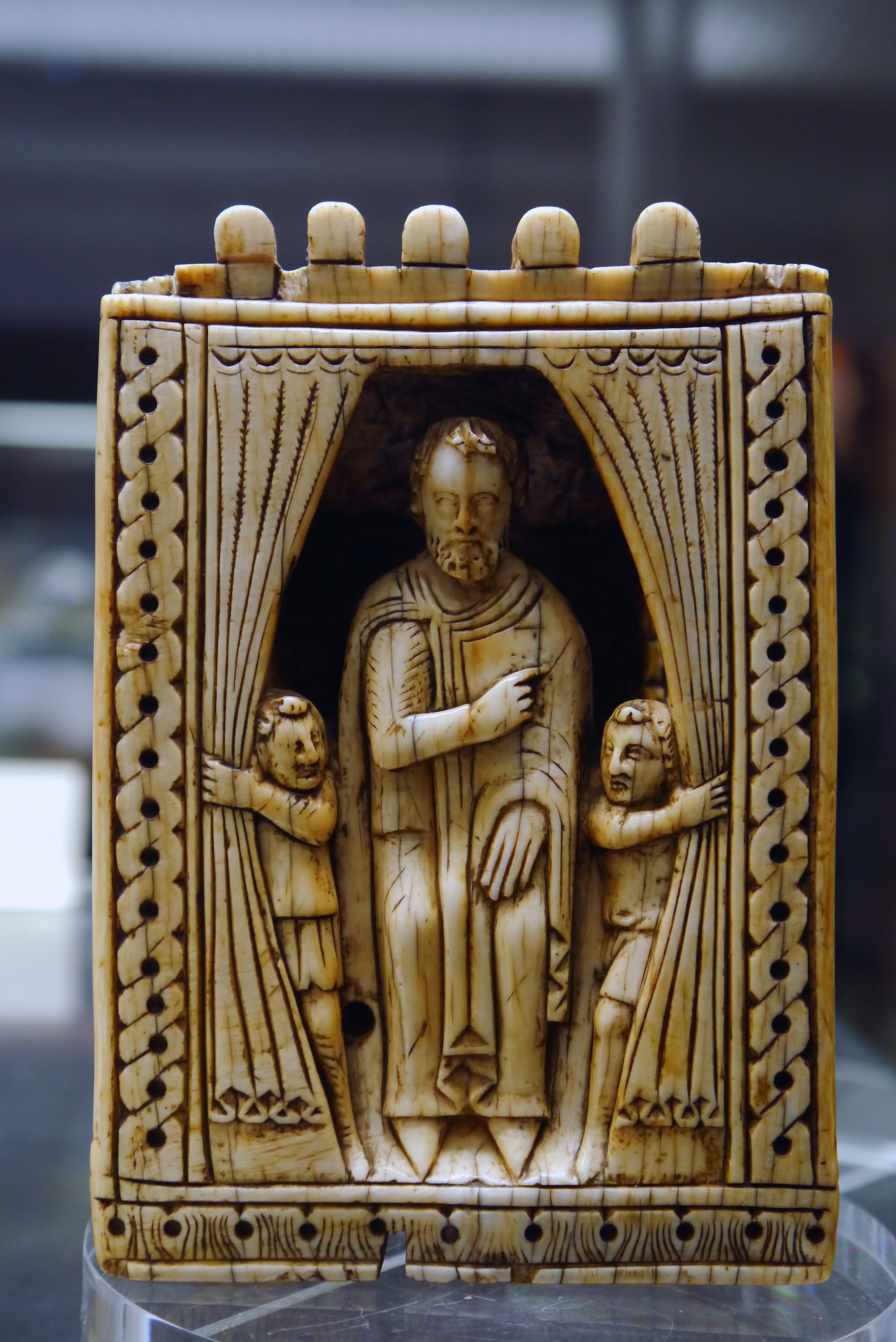
Ivory chess vizier, Italy, 12th century

In Shatranj, from which modern chess developed, the piece corresponding to the modern chess "queen" (though far weaker, only able to move one or two squares diagonally) was often called Wazīr. Up to the present, the word for the queen piece in chess is still called by variants of the word "vazīr" in many Middle Eastern, Central Asian and East European languages.

== Playing card rank ==
In Ganjifa cards, the vizier is a face card holding the second-highest rank in a suit, after the king. In Mamluk Kanjifa, there are two vizier ranks: the first vizier (na'ib malik), and the second vizier (na'ib thani). When Mamluk Kanjifa was introduced to Europe, the two ranks were transformed into the knight and knave in Latin-suited playing cards, and into the ober and unter in Swiss- and German-suited playing cards. The vizier may have had an important role in early playing card games as the Arabic term for vizier (na'ib) became synonymous to the name for playing cards in the Italian Renaissane (naibi) and even in Spain today (naipes).

In the Mysore Chad Ganjifa, the Vizier (Amatya or Mantri), is one of six court cards. It ranks third, after the King (Raja) and Queen (Rajni), and before the Knight (Senani), Jack (Padathi or Sevaka), and Banner (Dhwaja). In these cards, the vizier is depicted sitting in a ratha.

In Nabagunjara Ganjifa, the vizier is depicted as Arjuna.

== See also ==
- List of grand viziers of Persia
- Wasita (title)
- Wuzurg framadar

== Sources ==
- Bianquis, Th. (2002). "Wazīr. I. In the Arab World 2. The Fāṭimid caliphate". In Bearman, P. J.; Bianquis, Th.; Bosworth, C. E.; van Donzel, E. & Heinrichs, W. P. (eds.). The Encyclopaedia of Islam, Second Edition. Volume XI: W–Z. Leiden: E. J. Brill. pp. 188–190. ISBN 978-90-04-12756-2.
- Carmona, A. (2002). "Wazīr. I. In the Arab World 4. Muslim Spain". In Bearman, P. J.; Bianquis, Th.; Bosworth, C. E.; van Donzel, E. & Heinrichs, W. P. (eds.). The Encyclopaedia of Islam, Second Edition. Volume XI: W–Z. Leiden: E. J. Brill. pp. 191–192. ISBN 978-90-04-12756-2.
- Eddé, Anne-Marie (2002). "Wazīr. I. In the Arab World 3. The Ayyūbids". In Bearman, P. J.; Bianquis, Th.; Bosworth, C. E.; van Donzel, E. & Heinrichs, W. P. (eds.). The Encyclopaedia of Islam, Second Edition. Volume XI: W–Z. Leiden: E. J. Brill. pp. 190–191. ISBN 978-90-04-12756-2.
- İnalcık, Halil (2002). "Wazīr. III. In the Ottoman Empire". In Bearman, P. J.; Bianquis, Th.; Bosworth, C. E.; van Donzel, E. & Heinrichs, W. P. (eds.). The Encyclopaedia of Islam, Second Edition. Volume XI: W–Z. Leiden: E. J. Brill. pp. 194–197. ISBN 978-90-04-12756-2.
- Lambton, Ann K. S. (2002). "Wazīr. II. In Persia". In Bearman, P. J.; Bianquis, Th.; Bosworth, C. E.; van Donzel, E. & Heinrichs, W. P. (eds.). The Encyclopaedia of Islam, Second Edition. Volume XI: W–Z. Leiden: E. J. Brill. pp. 192–194. ISBN 978-90-04-12756-2.
- Zaman, Muhammad Qasim (2002). "Wazīr. I. In the Arab World 1. The ʿAbbāsids.". In Bearman, P. J.; Bianquis, Th.; Bosworth, C. E.; van Donzel, E. & Heinrichs, W. P. (eds.). The Encyclopaedia of Islam, Second Edition. Volume XI: W–Z. Leiden: E. J. Brill. pp. 185–188. ISBN 978-90-04-12756-2.
- Etymology OnLine
