= Kesuj =

Village in Isfahan province, Iran

Kesuj Persian: كسوج
- Village
- Location within Iran
- Coordinates: 33°24′04″N 52°13′48″E
- Country: Iran
- Province: Isfahan
- County: Ardestan
- District: Mahabad
- Rural District: Hombarat

Population (2016)
  - Total: 98
- Time zone: UTC+3:30 (IRST)

Kesuj (Persian: كسوج) (Note: Also romanized as Kesūj; also known as Kesūch, Kosūch, and Kosvach) is a village in, and the capital of, Hombarat Rural District in Mahabad District of Ardestan County, Isfahan province, Iran. The previous capital of the rural district was the village of Kachu Sang.

== Demographics ==
=== Population ===
At the time of the 2006 National Census, the village's population was 71 in 22 households, when it was in Garmsir Rural District of the Central District. The following census in 2011 counted 48 people in 22 households. The 2016 census measured the population of the village as 98 people in 36 households.

In 2019, the rural district was separated from the district in the formation of Mahabad District. Kesuj was transferred to Hombarat Rural District in 2023.
