= Hombarat Rural District =

Rural district in Isfahan province, Iran

Hombarat Rural District Persian: دهستان همبرات
- Rural District
- Location within Iran
- Coordinates: 33°18′N 52°15′E
- Country: Iran
- Province: Isfahan
- County: Ardestan
- District: Mahabad
- Established: 1993
- Capital: Kesuj

Population (2016)
  - Total: 830
- Time zone: UTC+3:30 (IRST)

Hombarat Rural District (Persian: دهستان همبرات) is in Mahabad District of Ardestan County, Isfahan province, Iran. Its capital is the village of Kesuj. The previous capital of the rural district was the village of Kachu Sang.

== Demographics ==
=== Population ===
At the time of the 2006 National Census, the rural district's population (as a part of the Central District) was 728 in 285 households. There were 554 inhabitants in 232 households at the following census of 2011. The 2016 census measured the population of the rural district as 830 in 232 households. The most populous of its 39 villages was Shirazan, with 127 people.

In 2019, the rural district was separated from the district in the formation of Mahabad District.

=== Other villages in the rural district ===
- Aliabad-e Pain
- Arderancheh
- Astaneh
- Bam Sareh
- Band Astaneh
- Davaran
- Deh Gerdian
- Duk
- Gunian
- Hombar
- Homsar
- Lashgar Kuh
- Lij
- Penart
- Rownaq
- Rudkhaneh
- Shideh
- Sina
- Taleqan
- Vandabad
