= Rudkhaneh, Isfahan =

Village in Isfahan province, Iran

Rudkhaneh Persian: رودخانه
- Village
- Location within Iran
- Country: Iran
- Province: Isfahan
- County: Ardestan
- District: Mahabad
- Rural District: Hombarat

Population (2016)
  - Total: 16
- Time zone: UTC+3:30 (IRST)

Rudkhaneh (Persian: رودخانه) (Note: Also romanized as Rūdkhāneh; also known as Darreh Chāleh Mes̄qālī) is a village in Hombarat Rural District of Mahabad District in Ardestan County, Isfahan province, Iran.

== Demographics ==
=== Population ===
At the time of the 2006 National Census, the village's population was seven in four households, when it was in the Central District. The following census in 2011 counted 16 people in four households. The 2016 census measured the population of the village as 16 people in five households.

In 2019, the rural district was separated from the district in the formation of Mahabad District.
