= Dowlatabad, Ardestan =

Village in Isfahan province, Iran

Dowlatabad Persian: دولت آباد
- Village
- Location within Iran
- Coordinates: 33°36′32″N 52°12′00″E
- Country: Iran
- Province: Isfahan
- County: Ardestan
- District: Mahabad
- Rural District: Garmsir

Population (2016)
  - Total: 67
- Time zone: UTC+3:30 (IRST)

Dowlatabad (Persian: دولت آباد) (Note: Also romanized as Dowlatābād; also known as Daulatābād and Dowlatābād-e Mūghār) is a village in Garmsir Rural District of Mahabad District in Ardestan County, Isfahan province, Iran.

== Demographics ==
=== Population ===
At the time of the 2006 National Census, the village's population was 141 in 42 households, when it was in the Central District. The following census in 2011 counted 132 people in 44 households. The 2016 census measured the population of the village as 67 people in 28 households.

In 2019, the rural district was separated from the district in the establishment of Mahabad District.
