= Khorramabad, Ardestan =

Village in Isfahan province, Iran

Khorramabad Persian: خرم اباد
- Village
- Location within Iran
- Coordinates: 33°25′00″N 52°07′46″E
- Country: Iran
- Province: Isfahan
- County: Ardestan
- District: Mahabad
- Rural District: Garmsir

Population (2016)
  - Total: 47
- Time zone: UTC+3:30 (IRST)

Khorramabad (Persian: خرم اباد) (Note: Also romanized as Khorramābād) is a village in Garmsir Rural District of Mahabad District in Ardestan County, Isfahan province, Iran.

== Demographics ==
=== Population ===
At the time of the 2006 National Census, the village's population was 66 in 19 households, when it was in the Central District. The following census in 2011 counted 53 people in 20 households. The 2016 census measured the population of the village as 47 people in 20 households.

In 2019, the rural district was separated from the district in the establishment of Mahabad District.
