= Mughar, Iran =

Village in Isfahan province, Iran

Mughar Persian: موغار
- Village
- Location within Iran
- Coordinates: 33°34′14″N 52°11′47″E
- Country: Iran
- Province: Isfahan
- County: Ardestan
- District: Mahabad
- Rural District: Garmsir

Population (2016)
  - Total: 1,139
- Time zone: UTC+3:30 (IRST)

Mughar (Persian: موغار) (Note: Also romanized as Mūghār; also known as Moghār and Moqār) is a village in, and the capital of, Garmsir Rural District in Mahabad District of Ardestan County, Isfahan province, Iran. The previous capital of the rural district was the village of Mahabad, now a city.

== Demographics ==
=== Population ===
At the time of the 2006 National Census, the village's population was 1,272 in 340 households, when it was in the Central District. The following census in 2011 counted 1,071 people in 323 households. The 2016 census measured the population of the village as 1,139 people in 385 households, the most populous in its rural district.

In 2019, the rural district was separated from the district in the establishment of Mahabad District.
