= Bam Sareh =

Village in Isfahan province, Iran

Bam Sareh Persian: بام ساره
- Village
- Location within Iran
- Coordinates: 33°18′06″N 52°15′38″E
- Country: Iran
- Province: Isfahan
- County: Ardestan
- District: Mahabad
- Rural District: Hombarat

Population (2016)
  - Total: Below reporting threshold
- Time zone: UTC+3:30 (IRST)

Bam Sareh (Persian: بام ساره) (Note: Also romanized as Bām Sāreh) is a village in Hombarat Rural District of Mahabad District in Ardestan County, Isfahan province, Iran.

== Demographics ==
=== Population ===
At the time of the 2006 National Census, the village's population was seven in five households, when it was in the Central District. The following censuses in 2011 and 2016 counted a population below the reporting threshold.

In 2019, the rural district was separated from the district in the formation of Mahabad District.
