= Band Astaneh =

Village in Isfahan province, Iran

Band Astaneh Persian: بنداستانه
- Village
- Location within Iran
- Coordinates: 33°17′59″N 52°17′33″E
- Country: Iran
- Province: Isfahan
- County: Ardestan
- District: Mahabad
- Rural District: Hombarat

Population (2016)
  - Total: 10
- Time zone: UTC+3:30 (IRST)

Band Astaneh (Persian: بنداستانه) (Note: Also romanized as Band Āstāneh) is a village in Hombarat Rural District of Mahabad District in Ardestan County, Isfahan province, Iran.

== Demographics ==
=== Population ===
At the time of the 2006 National Census, the village's population was 22 in six households, when it was in the Central District. The following census in 2011 counted 15 people in four households. The 2016 census measured the population of the village as 10 people in four households.

In 2019, the rural district was separated from the district in the formation of Mahabad District.
