= Sarhangcheh =

Village in Isfahan province, Iran

Sarhangcheh Persian: سرهنگچه
- Village
- Location within Iran
- Country: Iran
- Province: Isfahan
- County: Ardestan
- District: Mahabad
- Rural District: Garmsir

Population (2016)
  - Total: 80
- Time zone: UTC+3:30 (IRST)

Sarhangcheh (Persian: سرهنگچه) is a village in Garmsir Rural District of Mahabad District in Ardestan County, Isfahan province, Iran.

== Demographics ==
=== Population ===
At the time of the 2006 National Census, the village's population was 89 in 25 households, when it was in the Central District. The following census in 2011 counted 83 people in 29 households. The 2016 census measured the population of the village as 80 people in 30 households.

In 2019, the rural district was separated from the district in the establishment of Mahabad District.
