= Hasanabad, Garmsir =

Village in Isfahan province, Iran

Hasanabad Persian: حسن اباد
- Village
- Location within Iran
- Coordinates: 33°35′20″N 52°14′44″E
- Country: Iran
- Province: Isfahan
- County: Ardestan
- District: Mahabad
- Rural District: Garmsir

Population (2016)
  - Total: 279
- Time zone: UTC+3:30 (IRST)

Hasanabad (Persian: حسن اباد) (Note: Also romanized as Ḩasanābād) is a village in Garmsir Rural District of Mahabad District in Ardestan County, Isfahan province, Iran.

== Demographics ==
=== Population ===
At the time of the 2006 National Census, the village's population was 245 in 50 households, when it was in the Central District. The following census in 2011 counted 247 people in 61 households. The 2016 census measured the population of the village as 279 people in 79 households.

In 2019, the rural district was separated from the district in the establishment of Mahabad District.
