= Goruh-e Sarhangcheh =

Village in Isfahan province, Iran

Goruh-e Sarhangcheh Persian: گروه سرهنگچه
- Village
- Country: Iran
- Province: Isfahan
- County: Ardestan
- District: Mahabad
- Rural District: Garmsir

Population (2016)
  - Total: 16
- Time zone: UTC+3:30 (IRST)

Goruh-e Sarhangcheh (Persian: گروه سرهنگچه) (Note: Also romanized as Gorūh-e Sarhangcheh) is a village in Garmsir Rural District of Mahabad District in Ardestan County, Isfahan province, Iran.

== Demographics ==
=== Population ===
At the time of the 2006 National Census, the village's population was 40 in nine households, when it was in the Central District. The following census in 2011 counted 25 people in eight households. The 2016 census measured the population of the village as 16 people in seven households.

In 2019, the rural district was separated from the district in the establishment of Mahabad District.
