= Khoshkabad, Isfahan =

Village in Isfahan province, Iran

Khoshkabad Persian: خشک آباد
- Village
- Location within Iran
- Coordinates: 33°35′15″N 52°14′26″E
- Country: Iran
- Province: Isfahan
- County: Ardestan
- District: Mahabad
- Rural District: Garmsir

Population (2016)
  - Total: 284
- Time zone: UTC+3:30 (IRST)

Khoshkabad (Persian: خشک آباد) (Note: Also romanized as Khoshkābād; also known as Khosgābād, Khoshkbād, and Khowshābād) is a village in Garmsir Rural District of Mahabad District in Ardestan County, Isfahan province, Iran.

== Demographics ==
=== Population ===
At the time of the 2006 National Census, the village's population was 320 in 65 households, when it was in the Central District. The following census in 2011 counted 347 people in 87 households. The 2016 census measured the population of the village as 284 people in 91 households.

In 2019, the rural district was separated from the district in the establishment of Mahabad District.
