= Duk, Isfahan =

Village in Isfahan province, Iran

Duk Persian: دوك
- Village
- Location within Iran
- Coordinates: 33°16′17″N 52°16′15″E
- Country: Iran
- Province: Isfahan
- County: Ardestan
- District: Mahabad
- Rural District: Hombarat

Population (2016)
  - Total: 18
- Time zone: UTC+3:30 (IRST)

Duk (Persian: دوك) (Note: Also romanized as Dūk) is a village in Hombarat Rural District of Mahabad District in Ardestan County, Isfahan province, Iran.

== Demographics ==
=== Population ===
At the time of the 2006 National Census, the village's population was 52 in 20 households, when it was in the Central District. The following census in 2011 counted 15 people in seven households. The 2016 census measured the population of the village as 18 people in eight households.

In 2019, the rural district was separated from the district in the formation of Mahabad District.
