= Shamsabad, Ardestan =

Village in Isfahan province, Iran

Shamsabad Persian: شمس اباد
- Village
- Location within Iran
- Country: Iran
- Province: Isfahan
- County: Ardestan
- District: Mahabad
- Rural District: Garmsir

Population (2016)
  - Total: 224
- Time zone: UTC+3:30 (IRST)

Shamsabad (Persian: شمس اباد) (Note: Also romanized as Shamsābād) is a village in Garmsir Rural District of Mahabad District in Ardestan County, Isfahan province, Iran.

== Demographics ==
=== Population ===
At the time of the 2006 National Census, the village's population was 35 in seven households, when it was in the Central District. The following census in 2011 counted 58 people in nine households. The 2016 census measured the population of the village as 22 people in four households.

In 2019, the rural district was separated from the district in the establishment of Mahabad District.
