= Homsar =

Homsar may refer to:

- Homsar, Iran, a village in Isfahan Province, Iran
- Homsar, a fictional character in Homestar Runner
