= Ghaznavid campaigns in Persia =

Ghaznavid conquests in Persia and adjoining territories

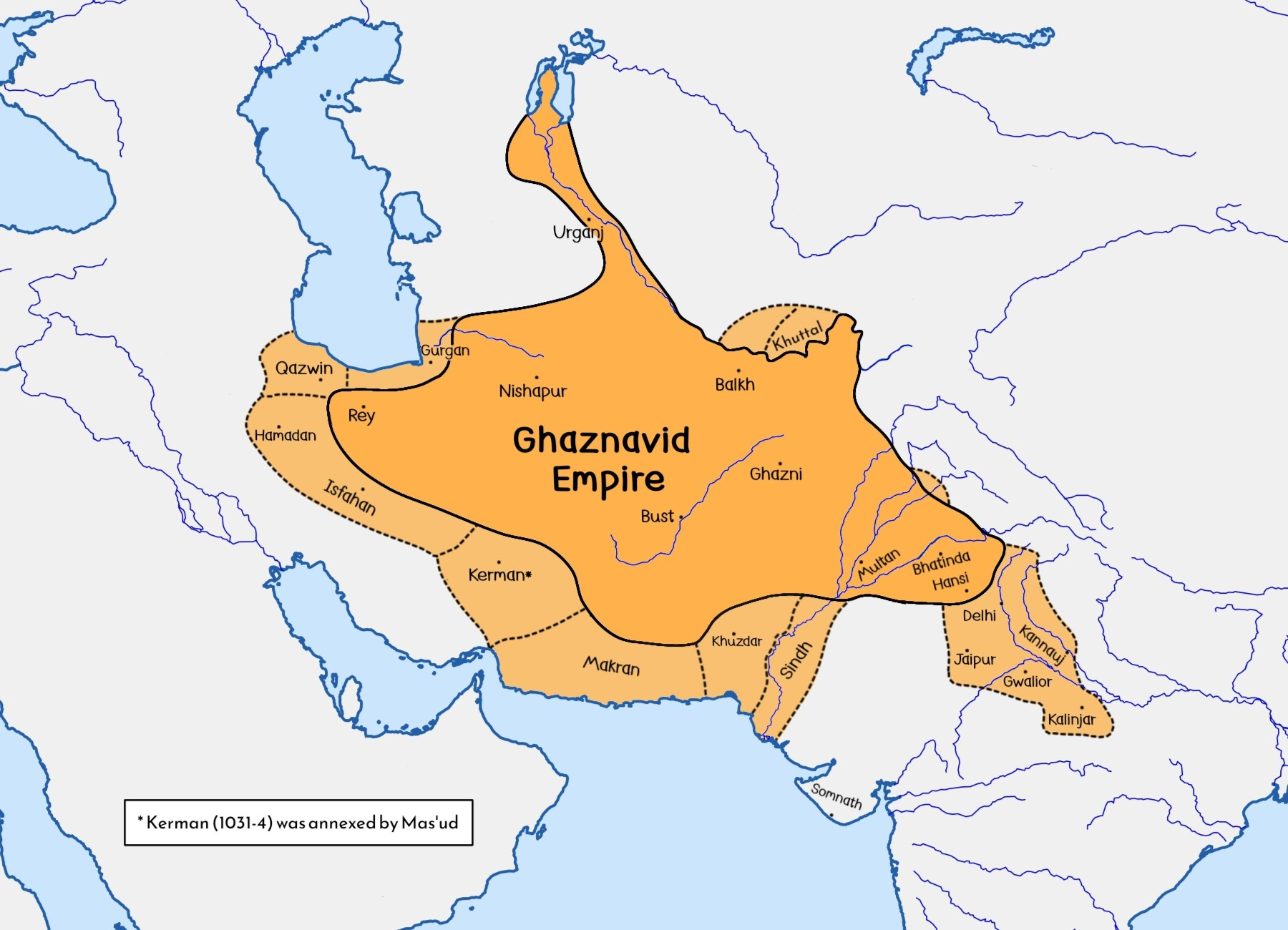
- Western territories of the Ghaznavid Empire after Persian campaigns
Date	1012, 1026–37
Location	Persia (modern-day Iran)
Result	Ghaznavid victory
Territorial changes	Ray, Hamadan, Isfahan, Tabaristan, Jibal annexed by the Ghaznavids. All territories lost by 1037. See § Aftermath

Belligerents
Ghaznavids; Supported by: Ziyarids (from 1012)	Ziyarids (until 1012); Buyids; Kakuyids; Sallarids; Rawadids; Ma'danids

Commanders and leaders
Mahmud of Ghazni # Arslan Jadhib; Mas'ud I Hajib 'Ali; Marzuban bin Hasan; Abu Sahl Hamdawi; Yariq-Toghmash; Tash Farrash †	Qabus; Majd al-Dawla (POW); Abu Dulaf; Manuchihr (surrendered); Isa of Makran; Ala al-Dawla Muhammad; Ibrahim bin Marzuban; Bahram bin Mafinna

Strength
1029: 8,000 cavalry (Note: Against Buyids of Ray in 1029.); 1030: 4,000 cavalry; 3,000 infantry (Note: Against Ma'danids in 1030.); 1034: 4,000 cavalry; 2,500 infantry; 5 elephants (Note: Against Buyids of Kerman)	1037: 1,500 (Note: Kakuyid force in 1037 in Ray.); 1030: 20,000 infantry; 6,000 cavalry; 10 elephants (Note: Ma'danid forces in 1030.); 1034: 10,000 (Note: Buyids of Kerman)

The Ghaznavid campaigns in Persia, (modern-day Iran) was a series of expeditions and conquests led by Ghaznavid Empire based in Ghazni. The Ghaznavids under Mahmud of Ghazni and Mas'ud, expanded their empire into Persia, targeting regions of Makran, Ray, Hamadan, Ishfahan, Tabaristan, Jibal, Fars, Kurdistan adjoining land of Sistan, Khorasan and parts of northern Persia. The conquests mostly occurred between 1026 and 1034 except Tabaristan which was subdued in 1012 AD. These campaigns were driven by ambitions of territorial expansion and spread of Sunni Islam, often conflicting with the local Persian dynasties like the Buyids, Kakuyids, Ziyarids, Ma'danids and Sallarids, also secured regions through diplomacy.

In 1012, following the subjugation of the Ziyarids in Tabaristan, the Ghaznavids expanded into Makran between 1026 and 1031, installing a loyal vassal. Sultan Mahmud led the main westward offensive in 1029, annexing Ray, deposing the Buyid ruler Majd al-Dawla in May, and capturing the Sallarid ruler Ibrahim bin Marzuban in September. The Rawwadids of Azerbaijan submitted too. Following Mahmud's death in 1030, his successor Mas'ud I captured Hamadan and Isfahan from the Kakuyids. Ghaznavid authority peaked quickly. However between 1031 and 1034, a Buyid counter-offensive expelled the Ghaznavids from Kerman. By 1037, the Kakuyid recaptured Ray and Hamadan, reversing the territorial gains in western Persia.

== Background ==
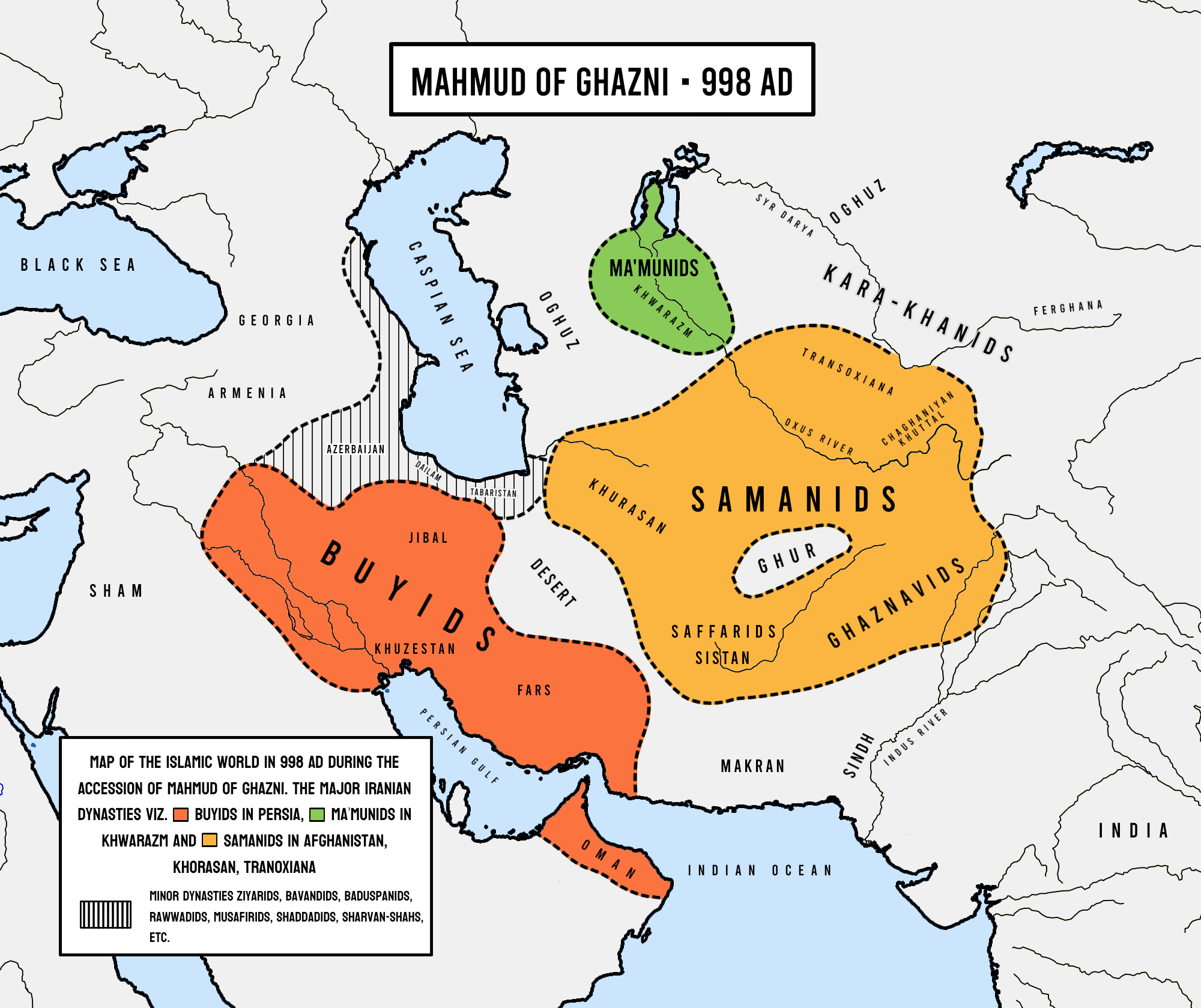
The Ghaznavid domains under Samanid suzerainty in 998 during Mahmud's first year of reign. The Buyids in Persia and Ma'munids in Khwarazm along with other minor Iranian dynasties.

Mahmud of Ghazni (r. 998–1030) waged wars against perceived enemies of Sunni Islam, targeting Shi'ite Buyids in modern Iraq and Iran, who controlled the Abbasid Caliphate in Baghdad, and the Shi'ite Fatimids in Egypt, who claimed a rival caliphate against the Abbasids. Mahmud and his son Mas‘ud aimed to overthrow both the Buyids and Fatimids.

Mahmud's initial policy with the Buyids was one of non-intervention until his final year. In 1016–17, he sent military aid to the rebellious Buyid governor of Kerman, Qawam al-Dawla, against his brother Sultan al-Dawla of Fars, but the troops failed to restore Qawam's position. Later, when another succession dispute arose in Kerman, Mahmud chose not to intervene. After Fakhr al-Dawla's death in 997 AD, Majd al-Dawla acceded the Buyid throne at the age of nine. His mother Sayyida became the regent of the empire. In 1028, after his mother's death Majd became the de facto ruler. His incapability and lack of administration led decline of Buyid rule. According to contemporary historian Bayhaqi, Ghaznavid vizier Ahmad Maymandi asked Sultan Mahmud regarding the non-intervene policy towards the Buyids. In which he replied if a man ruled Ray, he would need a permanent army in Nishapur to counter the Buyid threat. However, with a woman in power, he perceived no significant threat to Khorasan.

== Conflicts with Ziyarids ==
The region of Tabaristan during Iranian Intermezzo

Ziyarid emir Qabus who ruled Jurjan and Tabaristan, succeeded his brother in 978 but was defeated by the Buyid emir Mu'ayyidad al-Dawlah in 981, forcing him to seek refuge with the Samanid amir Nuh. Despite attempts, amir Nuh could not restore Qabuss rule. In 997, Sabuktigin promised to help Qabus regain his kingdom but shortly died. His successor sultan Mahmud offered support but demanded quick repayment for the campaign's costs, which Qabus refused as he was in war with his brother for throne. After death of Ziyarid amir of Tabaristan Fakhr al-Dawla, Qabus retook Jurjan in 998 and expanded into Tabaristan and Jibal. In 1011–12, his army deposed him for cruelty, installing his son Manuchihr. Mahmud supported the other son of Qabus, Dara, to claim the throne, but Manuchihr secured his position by acknowledging Mahmud as overlord, paying 50,000 dinars annually. Following the acceptance of overlord, Mahmud married off one of his daughters to Manuchihr who remained under him, aiding Mahmud's campaigns and hosting him in Jurjan in 1029.

After Mahmud captured Ray from Buyids, Manuchihr, fearing an attack, turned hostile, blocking routes to Ghazna. Enraged, Mahmud marched on Jurjan, prompting Manuchihr to cease and pay a 500,000 dinar fine. Mahmud forgave him and returned to Ghazna. Manuchihr died soon after in 1029, one year before Mahmud. After Manuchihr's death in 1030, his son Anushirwan had to pay another levy of 500,000 dinars in order to secure recognition from Ghazna.

== Conflicts with Makran ==
The historical region of Makran in present-day Iran and Pakistan, comprised the strip of sea-coast from the Gulf of Oman to Sindh and a part of Kerman and Balochistan. In 970, Makran was under the Ma'danid dynasty, (Note: Based in Turbat present-day Balochistan, Pakistan) a vassal state of the Buyids of Kerman. Following the decline of Buyid dominance, its ruler named Mad'an by Bayhaqi shifted its alliance to Sabuktigin and then Mahmud. In 1025–26 AD, during Sultan Mahmud's absence on the Somnath expedition, Ma'dan died, leaving sons Isa and Abu'l-Mu'askar to vie for succession. The nobles and military supported Isa. Abu'l-Mu'askar was defeated and fled to Sistan. In 1026 AD, he sought help of Sultan Mahmud in Ghazni. Fearing Mahmud's support for his brother, Isa acknowledged Mahmud as overlord, securing his rule over Makran and agreeing to support Abu’l-Mu’askar. In 1029, when Mahmud was busy in conflict with the Seljuks in Khorasan, Isa stopped paying tribute and declared independence.

Mahmud resolved to install Abu'l-Mu'askar to the throne and sent 4,000 cavalry, 3,000 infantry supported by Iraqi Turkmen auxiliaries. But he died in 1030 A.D. Shortly after his accession, Mas'ud sent a large army under the command of Yariq-Toghmash, accompanying Abu'l-Mu'askar to Makran in 1031. Yariq-Toghmash commanded selected muqaddams and 2,000 branded cavalry. Hearing of the advance of the imperial forces, Isa collected a large force of 20,000 infantry and 6,000 cavalry. Isa also arrayed ten elephants in front of his army. The moment disorder appeared in the Ghaznavid ranks during the battle, Toghmash urged the soldiers to rush to action. The Ghaznavids emerged victorious and Isa fell fighting. Abu'l-Mu'askar was installed as ruler of Makran and Toghmash returned to Ghazni. Therefore, Mas'ud successfully replaced Isa and installed Abu'l-Mu'askar.

== Campaigns in Persia ==
=== Mahmud's conflict the Buyid dynasty ===
==== Conquest of Ray ====
In 1029, the Daylamite troops terrorised Ray and threatened the incapable ruler Majd al-Dawla, who sought Sultan Mahmud's help. Seizing the opportunity, Mahmud sent 8,000 cavalries under Hajib 'Ali to capture Majd al-Dawla. Mahmud himself marched to Jurjan to block Seljuk interference. In May 1029, Majd al-Dawla, welcomed 'Ali who put him in surveillance. Ali then captured Ray. Mahmud entered the city on May 26, 1029, without resistance, seizing immense wealth, including 500,000 dinars worth of jewels, 260,000 dinars in coin money, over 30,000 dinars gold and silver vessels. Majd al-Dawla and his son Abu Dulaf was sent to prison in India, successfully annexed Ray and Jibal. The Ghaznavid army then overrun Dailam, Kurdistan and Fars against other local rulers.

=== Conflict with the Sallarid dynasty ===
Map of Azerbaijan, known as Shirvan during Iranian Intermezzo

After capture of Buyid territories, neighbouring states offered allegiance except Ibrahim bin Marzuban of Dailam (commonly known as Salar), ruler of Zanjan, Abhar, Sarjahān and Shahrazūr. For his hostility Sultan Mahmud sent a large army against him under Marzuban bin Hasan, who was an old rival of the Sallarid and had taken refuge with the Ghaznavids. Marzuban making an alliance with some of the Daylamite chieftains, advanced against the Salar and captured Qazwin. After Mahmud returned to Ghazni Salar defeating Marzuban retook Qazwin.

Mahmud placed Masud incharge of newly conquered territories and tasked him with subduing remaining Buyid territories. Masud, accompanied by Marzuban, besieged the Salar at the fortified stronghold of Sarjahan. Masud bribed the Sallarid officers to reveal weak point of the fort. The Salar left with no choice engaged the besiegers in battle on 13 September 1029 but was defeated and captured. His son subsequently submitted, recognised the Ghaznavids and agreed to pay tribute. Mas'ud then moved to subdued Hamadan and Isfahan. The neighbouring country of Azerbaijan under Rawadid dynasty was also forced to pay tribute to Ghazni.

=== Mas'ud's war with the Buyids ===
==== Campaign of Hamadan and Isfahan ====
Mas'ud, after returning to Ray, continued the conquest of Buyid territories, targeting Kakuyids of Hamadan and Isfahan. He captured Hamadan and then advanced to Isfahan, which he seized in January 1030 from Ala'u'd-Dawla Kakuwih, (governor of Hamadan and Isfahan) also known as Ibn Kakuwih. Through the Caliph's mediation, influenced by Ala al-Dawla's kinsman Jalalu'd-Dawlah in Baghdad, Mas'ud permitted Ala al-Dawla to govern Isfahan as his deputy and tributary, contingent on an annual tribute of 20,000 dinars.

On 26 May 1030, Mas'ud learned of his father Sultan Mahmud's death, prompting him to return to Ray, appoint Hasan-i-Sulaimani as governor, and march to Nishapur to secure the throne amid an anticipated succession dispute with his brother.

==== Campaign of Kerman (1031–1034) ====
The success in Makran encouraged Mas'ud to intervene in the Buyid province of Kerman. Masu'd sent envoy to caliph al-Qa'im stating his ambition to attack the Buyids. First capturing Oman from Makran and proceeding westwards liberating Abbasids from Buyid control further attacking the Byzantines and Fatimids. In 1031 AD, Ghaznavid army under Mas'ud, invaded Kirman (which was under the control of Buyids of Fars and Khuzistan) but defeated. In 1033 AD Mas'ud seized Buyid province of Kirman but a year later in 1034, 'Imad al-Din Abu Kalijar dispatched an army from Fars, led by his vizier Bahram bin Mafinna, which expelled the Ghaznavid garrison, forcing them to retreat to Nishapur. The 4000 cavalry, 2500 infantry and five elephants sent in 1034 to Kerman were beaten by a Buyid relieving force of 10,000.

== Aftermath ==
After capture of Ray from Majd al-Dawla, Mahmud carried out campaign against heretical sects like Qarmatians, Batinis, Mazdakites and Mu‘tazilites. Thousands of adherents were executed, while others were imprisoned and transported to Khorasan. Their residences were searched, confiscating and destroying texts associated with their heretical beliefs. Books aligning with the Sultan's views were transferred to the capital Ghazni. Mahmud wrote in his fath-nama to the caliph Al-Qadir spoke of cleansing Jibal of the "infidel Batiniyya and evil-doing innovators" He had ambitions to expand further into Iraq and face the Fatimids in Syria and Egypt, but his death in 1030 halted the plans. Ghaznavid rule in central and western Persia was short lived, lasting less than a decade whereas in Ray it lasted only seven years. The Sallarid and Rawadid dynasty in north-western region of Persia, paid tribute but did not remain under Ghaznavid influence for long. Following Mas'ud's succession, Kakuyids overthrew Ghaznavid suzerainty, captured Ray until Ghaznavid governor Abu Sahl Hamdawi drove him away from his capital Ishfahan for two years and seized his minister Ibn Sina's library containing heretical books. In 1033 AD, a Daylamite rebellion in Qazwin and Qum was suppressed. In 1037–38 AD, Kakuyids under Ala al-Dawla reoccupied Ray killing its governor Tash Farrash forcing Ghaznavids to abandon it. Although Coins were minted in the name of Mas'ud until Seljuks captured Ray. Mas'ud followed Mahmud's ambition to fully conquer the Shi'ite Buyid territories but was halted in 1040 at the Battle of Dandanqan, where Mas'ud's army was defeated by the Seljuks, who seized Khorasan. Parts of Persian territories were still occupied by Ghaznavids up to 1149 AD. By 1055 AD, Sultan Tughril (r. 1037–1063) of the Seljuk Empire took over the Buyid dominions of Western Persia and Iraq, also protected Baghdad from the hands of the Fatimids before 1060.

== See also ==
- Ghaznavid-Samanid war
- Ghaznavid-Saffarid war
- Kara-Khanid invasion of Khorasan
- Ghaznavid-Hindu Shahi Wars
- Ghaznavid conquest of Khwarazm
- Battle of Nasa
- Battle of Sarakhs
- Battle of Dandanaqan

== Bibliography ==
- Nazim, Muhammad (1931). The Life and Times of Sultan Mahmud of Ghazna. Cambridge University Press.
- Bosworth, C.E. (1963). The Ghaznavids, 994-1040. Edinburgh University Press.
- Frye, R. N. (1975). The Cambridge History of Iran. Vol. 4. Cambridge University Press. ISBN 978-0-521-20093-6.
- Asimov, M. S. (1998). History of civilizations of Central Asia: The Age of Achievement: A.D. 750 to the End of the Fifteenth Century. Vol. IV. UNESCO Publishing. ISBN 978-92-3-103467-1.
- Boyle, J. A. (1968). The Cambridge History of Iran. Vol. 5. Cambridge University Press. ISBN 978-0-521-06936-6.
- Mikaberidze, Alexander (2011-07-22). Conflict and Conquest in the Islamic World: A Historical Encyclopedia [2 volumes]: A Historical Encyclopedia. ABC-CLIO. ISBN 978-1-59884-337-8.
- Raza, S. Jabir (2013). "Mukran and the Ghaznavids". Proceedings of the Indian History Congress. 74: 196–204. ISSN 2249-1937.
- Panhwar, M. H. (January 2003). An Illustrated Historical Atlas Of Soomra Kingdom Of Sindh (1011-1351 AD). Sindh: Soomra National Council.
