= Vandabad =

Village in Isfahan province, Iran

Vandabad Persian: ونداباد
- Village
- Location within Iran
- Coordinates: 33°21′04″N 52°14′50″E
- Country: Iran
- Province: Isfahan
- County: Ardestan
- District: Mahabad
- Rural District: Hombarat

Population (2016)
  - Total: 10
- Time zone: UTC+3:30 (IRST)

Vandabad (Persian: ونداباد) (Note: Also romanized as Vandābād) is a village in Hombarat Rural District of Mahabad District in Ardestan County, Isfahan province, Iran.

== Demographics ==
=== Population ===
At the time of the 2006 National Census, the village's population was 14 in six households, when it was in the Central District. The following census in 2011 counted 11 people in five households. The 2016 census measured the population of the village as 10 people in six households.

In 2019, the rural district was separated from the district in the formation of Mahabad District.
