= Jafarabad, Mahabad =

Village in Isfahan province, Iran

Jafarabad Persian: جعفرآباد
- Village
- Location within Iran
- Coordinates: 33°36′49″N 52°13′18″E
- Country: Iran
- Province: Isfahan
- County: Ardestan
- District: Mahabad
- Rural District: Garmsir

Population (2016)
  - Total: 157
- Time zone: UTC+3:30 (IRST)

Jafarabad (Persian: جعفرآباد) (Note: Also romanized as Ja‘farābād; also known as Ja‘farābād-e Mūghār (جعفرآباد موغار)) is a village in Garmsir Rural District of Mahabad District in Ardestan County, Isfahan province, Iran.

== Demographics ==
=== Population ===
At the time of the 2006 National Census, the village's population was 183 in 45 households, when it was in the Central District. The following census in 2011 counted 134 people in 43 households. The 2016 census measured the population of the village as 157 people in 52 households.

In 2019, the rural district was separated from the district in the establishment of Mahabad District.
