= Lashgar Kuh =

Village in Isfahan province, Iran

Lashgar Kuh Persian: لشگركوه
- Village
- Location within Iran
- Coordinates: 33°18′32″N 52°14′37″E
- Country: Iran
- Province: Isfahan
- County: Ardestan
- District: Mahabad
- Rural District: Hombarat

Population (2016)
  - Total: 14
- Time zone: UTC+3:30 (IRST)

Lashgar Kuh (Persian: لشگركوه) (Note: Also romanized as Lashgar Kūh; also known as Lā Kūheh and Lākūh) is a village in Hombarat Rural District of Mahabad District in Ardestan County, Isfahan province, Iran.

== Demographics ==
=== Population ===
At the time of the 2006 National Census, the village's population was eight in five households, when it was in the Central District. The following census in 2011 counted nine people in five households. The 2016 census measured the population of the village as 14 people in seven households.

In 2019, the rural district was separated from the district in the formation of Mahabad District.
