= Deh Gerdian =

Village in Isfahan province, Iran

Deh Gerdian Persian: ده گرديان
- Village
- Location within Iran
- Coordinates: 33°20′30″N 52°16′04″E
- Country: Iran
- Province: Isfahan
- County: Ardestan
- District: Mahabad
- Rural District: Hombarat

Population (2016)
  - Total: Below reporting threshold
- Time zone: UTC+3:30 (IRST)

Deh Gerdian (Persian: ده گرديان) (Note: Also romanized as Deh Gerdīān; also known as Deh-e Gerdyān Rownaq) is a village in Hombarat Rural District of Mahabad District in Ardestan County, Isfahan province, Iran.

== Demographics ==
=== Population ===
At the time of the 2006 National Census, the village's population was 13 in six households, when it was in the Central District. The following census in 2011 counted 16 people in six households. The 2016 census measured the population of the village as below the reporting threshold.

In 2019, the rural district was separated from the district in the formation of Mahabad District.
