= Arderancheh =

Village in Isfahan province, Iran

Arderancheh Persian: اردرانچه
- Village
- Location within Iran
- Coordinates: 33°16′05″N 52°13′40″E
- Country: Iran
- Province: Isfahan
- County: Ardestan
- District: Mahabad
- Rural District: Hombarat

Population (2016)
  - Total: 23
- Time zone: UTC+3:30 (IRST)

Arderancheh (Persian: اردرانچه) (Note: Also romanized as Ārderāncheh; also known as Ardāncheh) is a village in Hombarat Rural District of Mahabad District in Ardestan County, Isfahan province, Iran.

== Demographics ==
=== Population ===
At the time of the 2006 National Census, the village's population was 26 in 12 households, when it was in the Central District. The following census in 2011 counted 16 people in nine households. The 2016 census measured the population of the village as 23 people in 12 households.

In 2019, the rural district was separated from the district in the formation of Mahabad District.
