= Kachu Sang =

Village in Isfahan province, Iran

Kachu Sang Persian: كچوسنگ
- Village
- Location within Iran
- Coordinates: 33°17′12″N 52°13′58″E
- Country: Iran
- Province: Isfahan
- County: Ardestan
- District: Mahabad
- Rural District: Hombarat

Population (2016)
  - Total: 91
- Time zone: UTC+3:30 (IRST)

Kachu Sang (Persian: كچوسنگ) (Note: Also romanized as Kachū Sang) is a village in, and the former capital of, Hombarat Rural District in Mahabad District of Ardestan County, Isfahan province, Iran. The capital of the rural district has been transferred to the village of Kesuj.

== Demographics ==
=== Population ===
At the time of the 2006 National Census, the village's population was 51 in 25 households, when it was in the Central District. The following census in 2011 counted 66 people in 30 households. The 2016 census measured the population of the village as 91 people in 41 households.

In 2019, the rural district was separated from the district in the formation of Mahabad District.
