= Astaneh, Ardestan =

Village in Isfahan province, Iran

Astaneh Persian: استانه
- Village
- Location within Iran
- Coordinates: 33°17′30″N 52°17′18″E
- Country: Iran
- Province: Isfahan
- County: Ardestan
- District: Mahabad
- Rural District: Hombarat

Population (2016)
  - Total: 120
- Time zone: UTC+3:30 (IRST)

Astaneh (Persian: استانه) (Note: Also romanized as Āstāneh) is a village in Hombarat Rural District of Mahabad District in Ardestan County, Isfahan province, Iran.

== Demographics ==
=== Population ===
At the time of the 2006 National Census, the village's population was 60 in 21 households, when it was in the Central District. The following census in 2011 counted 44 people in 17 households. The 2016 census measured the population of the village as 120 people in 45 households.

In 2019, the rural district was separated from the district in the formation of Mahabad District.
