= Gol Anjireh =

Village in Isfahan province, Iran

Gol Anjireh Persian: گل انجيره
- Village
- Location within Iran
- Coordinates: 33°21′46″N 52°11′05″E
- Country: Iran
- Province: Isfahan
- County: Ardestan
- District: Mahabad
- Rural District: Garmsir

Population (2016)
  - Total: Below reporting threshold
- Time zone: UTC+3:30 (IRST)

Gol Anjireh (Persian: گل انجيره) (Note: Also romanized as Gol Ānjīreh; also known as Golānjīr) is a village in Garmsir Rural District of Mahabad District in Ardestan County, Isfahan province, Iran.

== Demographics ==
=== Population ===
At the time of the 2006 National Census, the village's population was seven in four households, when it was in the Central District. The following censuses in 2011 and 2016 counted a population below the reporting threshold.

In 2019, the rural district was separated from the district in the establishment of Mahabad District.
