= Gunian =

Village in Isfahan province, Iran

Gunian Persian: گونيان
- Village
- Location within Iran
- Coordinates: 33°15′41″N 52°14′06″E
- Country: Iran
- Province: Isfahan
- County: Ardestan
- District: Mahabad
- Rural District: Hombarat

Population (2016)
  - Total: 121
- Time zone: UTC+3:30 (IRST)

Gunian (Persian: گونيان) (Note: Also romanized as Gūnīān; also known as Goneyān) is a village in Hombarat Rural District of Mahabad District in Ardestan County, Isfahan province, Iran.

== Demographics ==
=== Population ===
At the time of the 2006 National Census, the village's population was 86 in 34 households, when it was in the Central District. The following census in 2011 counted 106 people in 41 households. The 2016 census measured the population of the village as 121 people in 45 households.

In 2019, the rural district was separated from the district in the formation of Mahabad District.
