= Davaran, Isfahan =

Village in Isfahan province, Iran

Davaran Persian: داوران
- Village
- Location within Iran
- Coordinates: 33°14′05″N 52°16′05″E
- Country: Iran
- Province: Isfahan
- County: Ardestan
- District: Mahabad
- Rural District: Hombarat

Population (2016)
  - Total: 106
- Time zone: UTC+3:30 (IRST)

Davaran (Persian: داوران) (Note: Also romanized as Dāvarān) is a village in Hombarat Rural District of Mahabad District in Ardestan County, Isfahan province, Iran.

== Demographics ==
=== Population ===
At the time of the 2006 National Census, the village's population was 46 in 14 households, when it was in the Central District. The following census in 2011 counted 54 people in 16 households. The 2016 census measured the population of the village as 106 people in 30 households.

In 2019, the rural district was separated from the district in the formation of Mahabad District.
