= Aliabad-e Pain, Isfahan =

Village in Isfahan province, Iran

Aliabad-e Pain Persian: علي ابادپائين
- Village
- Location within Iran
- Coordinates: 33°10′N 52°17′E
- Country: Iran
- Province: Isfahan
- County: Ardestan
- District: Mahabad
- Rural District: Hombarat

Population (2016)
  - Total: Below reporting threshold
- Time zone: UTC+3:30 (IRST)

Aliabad-e Pain (Persian: علي ابادپائين) (Note: Also romanized as ‘Alīābād-e Pā’īn; also known as ‘Alīābād) is a village in Hombarat Rural District of Mahabad District in Ardestan County, Isfahan province, Iran.

== Demographics ==
=== Population ===
At the time of the 2006 National Census, the village's population was 15 in four households, when it was in the Central District. The village did not appear in the following census of 2011. The 2016 census measured the population of the village as below the reporting threshold.

In 2019, the rural district was separated from the district in the formation of Mahabad District.
