= Shideh =

Village in Isfahan province, Iran

Shideh Persian: شيده
- Village
- Location within Iran
- Coordinates: 33°20′24″N 52°18′50″E
- Country: Iran
- Province: Isfahan
- County: Ardestan
- District: Mahabad
- Rural District: Hombarat

Population (2016)
  - Total: 5
- Time zone: UTC+3:30 (IRST)

Shideh (Persian: شيده) (Note: Also romanized as Shīdeh) is a village in Hombarat Rural District of Mahabad District in Ardestan County, Isfahan province, Iran.

== Demographics ==
=== Population ===
At the time of the 2006 National Census, the village's population was 17 in 11 households, when it was in the Central District. The following census in 2011 counted 12 people in eight households. The 2016 census measured the population of the village as five people in four households.

In 2019, the rural district was separated from the district in the formation of Mahabad District.
