= Shirazan =

Village in Isfahan province, Iran

Shirazan Persian: شيرازان
- Village
- Location within Iran
- Coordinates: 33°17′43″N 52°15′13″E
- Country: Iran
- Province: Isfahan
- County: Ardestan
- District: Mahabad
- Rural District: Hombarat

Population (2016)
  - Total: 127
- Time zone: UTC+3:30 (IRST)

Shirazan (Persian: شيرازان) (Note: Also romanized as Shīrāzān; also known as Shīrzān) is a village in Hombarat Rural District of Mahabad District in Ardestan County, Isfahan province, Iran.

== Demographics ==
=== Population ===
At the time of the 2006 National Census, the village's population was 78 in 25 households, when it was in the Central District. The following census in 2011 counted 19 people in 12 households. The 2016 census measured the population of the village as 127 people in 48 households, the most populous in its rural district.

In 2019, the rural district was separated from the district in the formation of Mahabad District.
