= Sina, Iran =

Village in Isfahan province, Iran

Sina Persian: سينا
- Village
- Location within Iran
- Coordinates: 33°18′25″N 52°15′57″E
- Country: Iran
- Province: Isfahan
- County: Ardestan
- District: Mahabad
- Rural District: Hombarat

Population (2016)
  - Total: Below reporting threshold
- Time zone: UTC+3:30 (IRST)

Sina (Persian: سينا) (Note: Also romanized as Sīnā) is a village in Hombarat Rural District of Mahabad District in Ardestan County, Isfahan province, Iran.

== Demographics ==
=== Population ===
At the time of the 2006 National Census, the village's population was seven in four households, when it was in the Central District. The following censuses in 2011 and 2016 counted a population below the reporting threshold.

In 2019, the rural district was separated from the district in the formation of Mahabad District.
