= Hoseynabad, Ardestan =

Village in Isfahan province, Iran

Hoseynabad Persian: حسين آباد
- Village
- Location within Iran
- Country: Iran
- Province: Isfahan
- County: Ardestan
- District: Mahabad
- Rural District: Garmsir

Population (2016)
  - Total: 206
- Time zone: UTC+3:30 (IRST)

Hoseynabad (Persian: حسين آباد) (Note: Also romanized as Ḩoseynābād) is a village in Garmsir Rural District of Mahabad District in Ardestan County, Isfahan province, Iran.

== Demographics ==
=== Population ===
At the time of the 2006 National Census, the village's population was 317 in 92 households, when it was in the Central District. The following census in 2011 counted 279 people in 85 households. The 2016 census measured the population of the village as 206 people in 69 households.

In 2019, the rural district was separated from the district in the establishment of Mahabad District.
