= Sahamiyeh, Ardestan =

Village in Isfahan province, Iran

Sahamiyeh Persian: سهاميه
- Village
- Location within Iran
- Country: Iran
- Province: Isfahan
- County: Ardestan
- District: Mahabad
- Rural District: Garmsir

Population (2016)
  - Total: 19
- Time zone: UTC+3:30 (IRST)

Sahamiyeh (Persian: سهاميه) (Note: Also romanized as Sahāmīyeh; also known as Nahumīyeh, Sarai, and Sarāy) is a village in Garmsir Rural District of Mahabad District in Ardestan County, Isfahan province, Iran.

== Demographics ==
=== Population ===
At the time of the 2006 National Census, the village's population was 36 in 12 households, when it was in the Central District. The following census in 2011 counted 27 people in nine households. The 2016 census measured the population of the village as 19 people in seven households.

In 2019, the rural district was separated from the district in the establishment of Mahabad District.
