= Dasht-e Azadegan, Isfahan =

Village in Isfahan province, Iran

Dasht-e Azadegan Persian: دشت ازادگان
- Village
- Location within Iran
- Country: Iran
- Province: Isfahan
- County: Ardestan
- District: Mahabad
- Rural District: Garmsir

Population (2016)
  - Total: 17
- Time zone: UTC+3:30 (IRST)

Dasht-e Azadegan (Persian: دشت ازادگان) (Note: Also romanized as Dasht-e Āzādegān) is a village in Garmsir Rural District of Mahabad District in Ardestan County, Isfahan province, Iran.

== Demographics ==
=== Population ===
At the time of the 2006 National Census, the village's population was 30 in seven households, when it was in the Central District. The following census in 2011 counted 20 people in five households. The 2016 census measured the population of the village as 17 people in four households.

In 2019, the rural district was separated from the district in the establishment of Mahabad District.
