= Heydarabad, Garmsir =

Village in Isfahan province, Iran

Heydarabad Persian: حيدراباد
- Village
- Location within Iran
- Coordinates: 33°35′50″N 52°12′37″E
- Country: Iran
- Province: Isfahan
- County: Ardestan
- District: Mahabad
- Rural District: Garmsir

Population (2016)
  - Total: 323
- Time zone: UTC+3:30 (IRST)

Heydarabad (Persian: حيدراباد) (Note: Also romanized as Ḩeydarābād) is a village in Garmsir Rural District of Mahabad District in Ardestan County, Isfahan province, Iran.

== Demographics ==
=== Population ===
At the time of the 2006 National Census, the village's population was 276 in 69 households, when it was in the Central District. The following census in 2011 counted 322 people in 89 households. The 2016 census measured the population of the village as 323 people in 96 households.

In 2019, the rural district was separated from the district in the establishment of Mahabad District.
