= Rahmatabad, Mahabad =

Village in Isfahan province, Iran

Rahmatabad Persian: رحمت آباد
- Village
- Location within Iran
- Coordinates: 33°36′13″N 52°12′40″E
- Country: Iran
- Province: Isfahan
- County: Ardestan
- District: Mahabad
- Rural District: Garmsir

Population (2016)
  - Total: 381
- Time zone: UTC+3:30 (IRST)

Rahmatabad (Persian: رحمت آباد) (Note: Also romanized as Raḩmatābād) is a village in Garmsir Rural District of Mahabad District in Ardestan County, Isfahan province, Iran.

== Demographics ==
=== Population ===
At the time of the 2006 National Census, the village's population was 501 in 123 households, when it was in the Central District. The following census in 2011 counted 455 people in 126 households. The 2016 census measured the population of the village as 381 people in 121 households.

In 2019, the rural district was separated from the district in the establishment of Mahabad District.
