= Taleqan, Isfahan =

Village in Isfahan province, Iran

Taleqan Persian: طالقان
- Village
- Location within Iran
- Coordinates: 33°16′21″N 52°11′50″E
- Country: Iran
- Province: Isfahan
- County: Ardestan
- District: Mahabad
- Rural District: Hombarat

Population (2016)
  - Total: 0
- Time zone: UTC+3:30 (IRST)

Taleqan (Persian: طالقان) (Note: Also romanized as Ţāleqān) is a village in Hombarat Rural District of Mahabad District in Ardestan County, Isfahan province, Iran.

== Demographics ==
=== Population ===
At the time of the 2006 National Census, the village's population was 18 in six households, when it was in the Central District. The following census in 2011 counted a population below the reporting threshold. The 2016 census measured the population of the village as zero.

In 2019, the rural district was separated from the district in the formation of Mahabad District.
