= Seri Jahan =

Village in Isfahan province, Iran

Seri Jahan Persian: سريجهن
- Village
- Location within Iran
- Coordinates: 33°23′32″N 52°10′44″E
- Country: Iran
- Province: Isfahan
- County: Ardestan
- District: Mahabad
- Rural District: Garmsir

Population (2016)
  - Total: 28
- Time zone: UTC+3:30 (IRST)

Seri Jahan (Persian: سريجهن) (Note: Also romanized as Sarī Jahan and Serī Jahan; also known as Sar Jahan, Sīr Jahand, Sīrī Jahan, and Sīrījahan) is a village in Garmsir Rural District of Mahabad District in Ardestan County, Isfahan province, Iran.

== Demographics ==
=== Population ===
At the time of the 2006 National Census, the village's population was 53 in 14 households, when it was in the Central District. The following census in 2011 counted 28 people in 13 households. The 2016 census measured the population of the village as 28 people in 10 households.

In 2019, the rural district was separated from the district in the establishment of Mahabad District.
