= Mas'ud II =

Ghaznavid sultan in 1048

Sultan of Ghaznavid Empire
- Reign: 1048–1048
- Predecessor: Mawdud of Ghazni
- Successor: Ali
- Born: ? Ghaznavid Empire
- Died: c. 1048; Ghaznavid Empire
Names
- Mas'ud bin Mawdud
- Dynasty: House of Sabuktigin
- Father: Mawdud of Ghazni
- Religion: Sunni Islam

Mas'ud ibn Mawdud ibn Mas'ud (Persian: مسعود ابن مودود ابن مسعود, romanized: Masʿūd ibn Mawdūd ibn Masʿūd), commonly known as Mas'ud II, was Ghaznavid sultan for sometime in 1048. Masud was the son and successor of Mawdud of Ghazni, and ruled for a short period from (r. 1048 – 1048). He was succeeded by his uncle Ali after his death in 1048.
