= Mahabad, Isfahan =

City in Isfahan province, Iran

Mahabad Persian: مهاباد
- City
- Location within Iran
- Coordinates: 33°31′38″N 52°13′08″E
- Country: Iran
- Province: Isfahan
- County: Ardestan
- District: Mahabad
- Established as a city: 1995

Population (2016)
  - Total: 3,727
- Time zone: UTC+3:30 (IRST)

Mahabad (Persian: مهاباد) (Note: Also romanized as Mahābād; also known as Mahbād) is a city in, and the capital of, Mahabad District in Ardestan County, Isfahan province, Iran. As a village, Mahabad was the capital of Garmsir Rural District until its capital was transferred to the village of Mughar. At the same time, Mahabad was converted to a city.

== Demographics ==
=== Population ===
At the time of the 2006 National Census, the city's population was 4,081 in 1,059 households, when it was in the Central District. The following census in 2011 counted 3,656 people in 1,082 households. The 2016 census measured the population of the city as 3,727 people in 1,158 households.

In 2019, the city and the rural district were separated from the district in the formation of Mahabad District.
