= Ghaznavid Empire =

Medieval Muslim Turkic dynasty and state (977–1186)

Ghaznavid Empire غزنویان Ġaznaviyān
- 977–1186
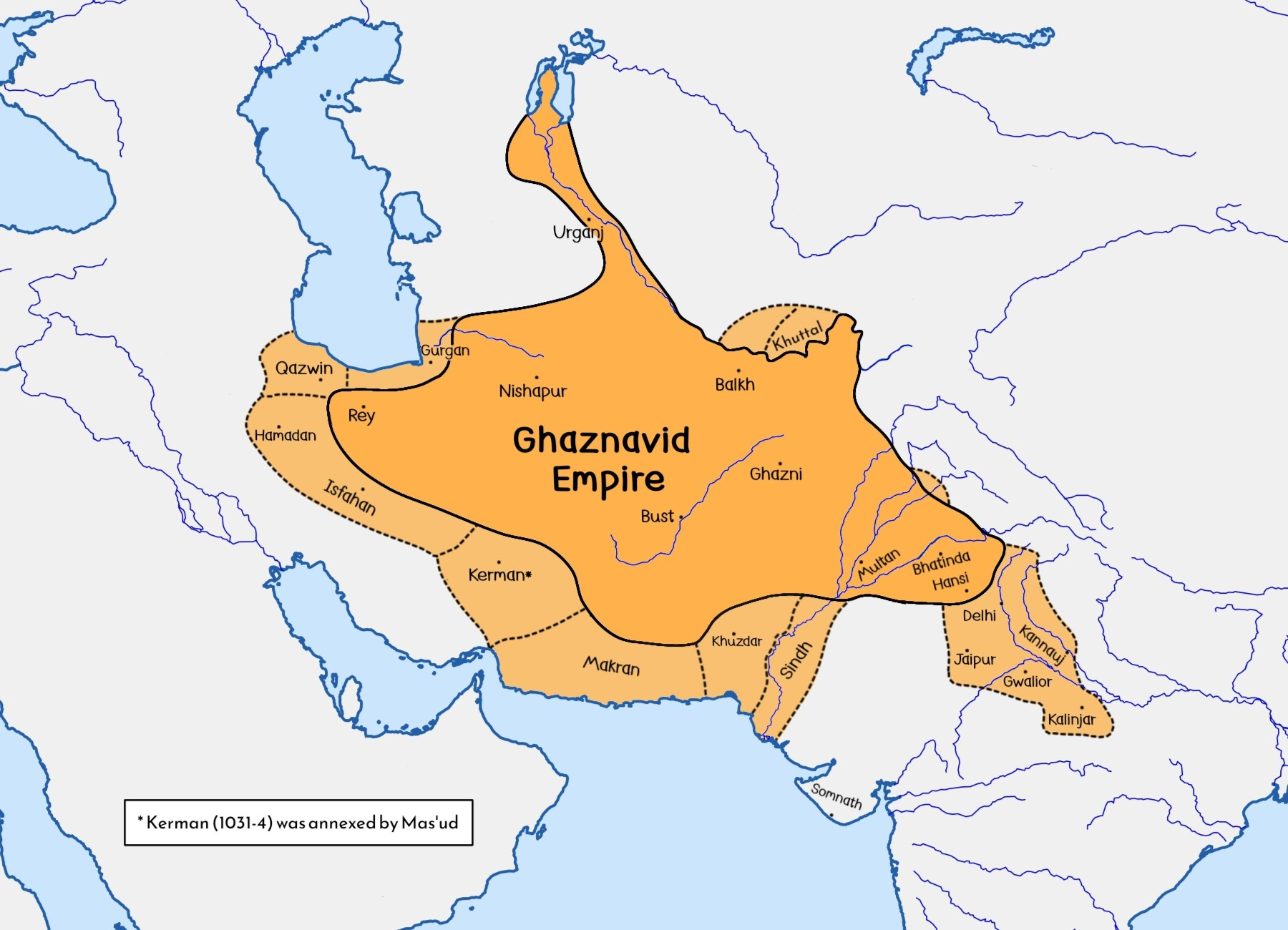
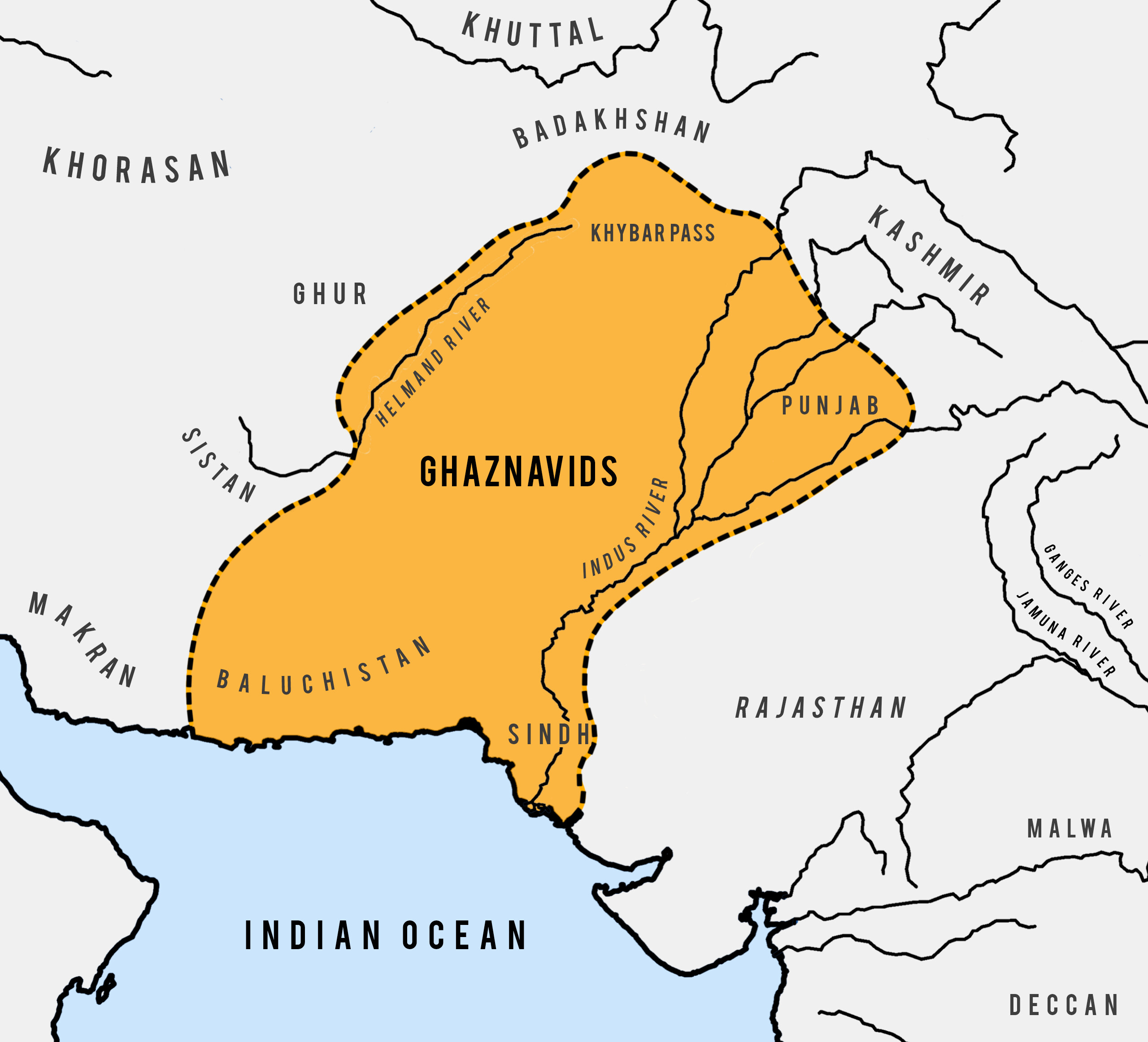
- Capital: Ghazni (977–1163); Lahore (1163–1186)
- Common languages: Persian (Note: "Indeed, since the formation of the Ghaznavids state in the tenth century until the fall of Qajars at the beginning of the twentieth century, most parts of the Iranian cultural regions were ruled by Turkic-speaking dynasties most of the time. At the same time, the official language was Persian, the court literature was in Persian, and most of the chancellors, ministers, and mandarins were Persian speakers of the highest learning and ability.") (official and court language; lingua franca); Sanskrit (coinage); Arabic (coinage and theology); Turkic (military)
- Religion: Sunni Islam (Hanafi)
- Government: Hereditary monarchy
- Sultan
  - 977–997: Sabuktigin (first)
  - 1160–1186: Khusrau Malik (last)
- Vizier
  - 998–1013: Abu'l-Hasan Isfaraini (first mentioned)
  - 12th century: Abu'l-Ma'ali Nasrallah (last mentioned)
- Historical era: Medieval
  - Established: 977
  - Hindu Shahi Wars: 977–1026
  - Campaigns in India: 977–1167
  - Battle of Ghazni: 998
  - Campaigns in Persia: 1026–34
  - Battle of Dandanaqan: 1040
  - Battle of Ghazni: 1117
  - Siege of Lahore: 1186

Area
- 1029 est.: 3,400,000 km^{2} (1,300,000 sq mi)
Preceded by
| Samanids |
| Saffarid dynasty |
| Ma'munids |
| Farighunids |
| Hindu Shahis |
| Emirate of Multan |
| Chaulukya dynasty |
| Branches of Rashtrakuta dynasty |
| Pratihara dynasty |
| Habbari dynasty |
| Buyid dynasty |
| Ziyarid dynasty |
| Kakuyids |
Succeeded by
| Seljuk Empire |
| Ghurid dynasty |

The Ghaznavid Empire (Persian: غزنویان, romanized: Ġaznaviyān) was a culturally Persianate, (Note: The Ghaznavids also claimed ancestry from the last Sasanian Shah, Yazdgerd III, but this was "a fictitious genealogy" they themselves had promulgated.) Sunni Muslim state of Turkic Karluk origin. Flourishing from 977 to 1186, the empire spread from the Oxus to the Indus Valley at its greatest extent. The dynasty was founded by Sabuktigin upon his succession to the rule of Ghazna after the death of his father-in-law, Alp Tigin, who was an ex-general of the Samanid Empire from Balkh.

Sabuktigin's son, Mahmud of Ghazni, expanded the Ghaznavid Empire to the Amu Darya, the Indus River and the Indian Ocean in the east and to Rey and Hamadan in the west. Under the reign of Mas'ud I, the Ghaznavid dynasty began losing control over its western territories to the Seljuk Empire after the Battle of Dandanaqan in 1040, resulting in a restriction of its holdings to modern-day Afghanistan, Pakistan and Northern India.

In 1151, Sultan Bahram Shah lost Ghazni to the Ghurid sultan Ala al-Din Husayn. The Ghaznavids retook Ghazni but lost the city to the Ghuzz Turks who in turn lost it to Muhammad of Ghor. In response, the Ghaznavids fled to Lahore, their regional capital. In 1186, Lahore was conquered by the Ghurid sultan, Muhammad of Ghor, and its Ghaznavid ruler, Khusrau Malik, was imprisoned and later executed.

== Rise to power ==
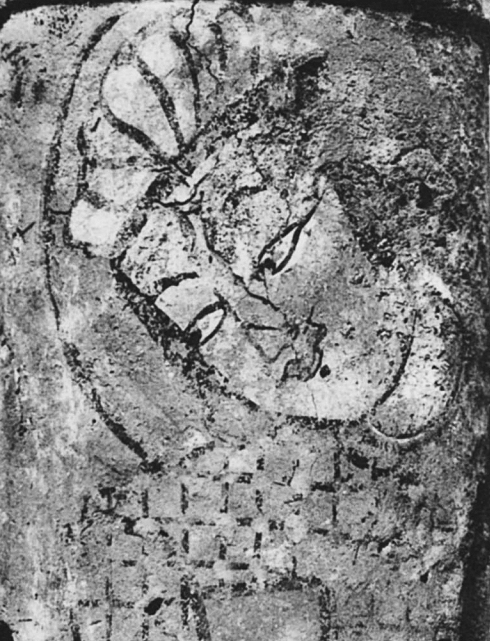
Ghaznavid portrait, Palace of Lashkari Bazar. Schlumberger noted that the turban, the small mouth and the strongly slanted eyes were characteristically Turkic. c. 11th century

Two military families arose from the Turkic slave-guards of the Samanid Empire, the Simjurids and Ghaznavids, who ultimately proved disastrous to the Samanids. The Simjurids received an appanage in the Kohistan region of eastern Khorasan. The Samanid generals Alp Tigin and Abu al-Hasan Simjuri competed for the governorship of Khorasan and control of the Samanid Empire by placing on the throne emirs they could dominate after the death of Abd al-Malik I in 961. His death created a succession crisis between his brothers.

A court party instigated by men of the scribal class – civilian ministers rather than Turkic generals – rejected the candidacy of Alp Tigin for the Samanid throne. Mansur I was installed instead, and Alp Tigin prudently retired to south of the Hindu Kush, where he captured Ghazna and became the ruler of the city as a Samanid authority. The Simjurids enjoyed control of Khorasan south of the Amu Darya but were hard-pressed by a third great Iranian dynasty, the Buyid dynasty, and were unable to survive the collapse of the Samanids and the subsequent rise of the Ghaznavids.

The struggles of the Turkic slave generals for mastery of the throne with the help of shifting allegiance from the court's ministerial leaders both demonstrated and accelerated the Samanid decline. Samanid weakness attracted into Transoxiana the Karluks, a Turkic people who had recently converted to Islam. They occupied Bukhara in 992, establishing in Transoxania the Kara-Khanid Khanate.

Alp Tigin's died in 963, and after two ghulam governors and three years, his slave Sabuktigin became the governor of Ghazna.

== Domination ==
=== Sabuktigin ===
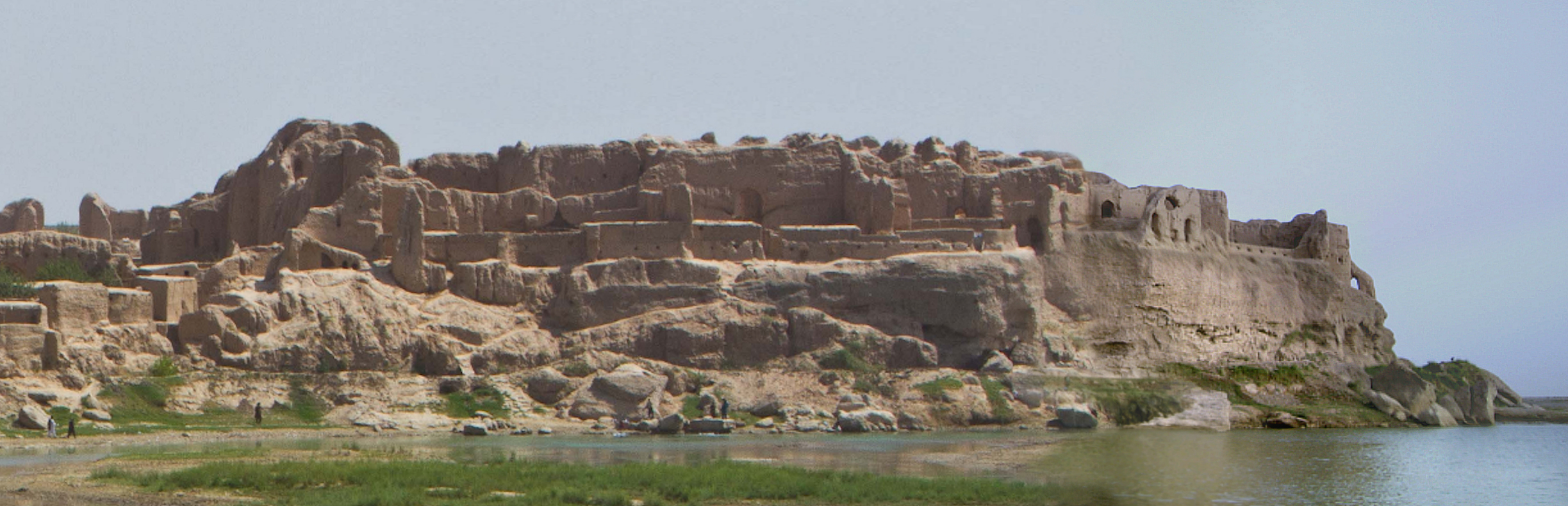
Ghaznavid fortress of Lashkari Bazar in Lashkargah, ancient Bost, southern Afghanistan. It was founded by Mahmud of Ghazni in 998–1030 CE.

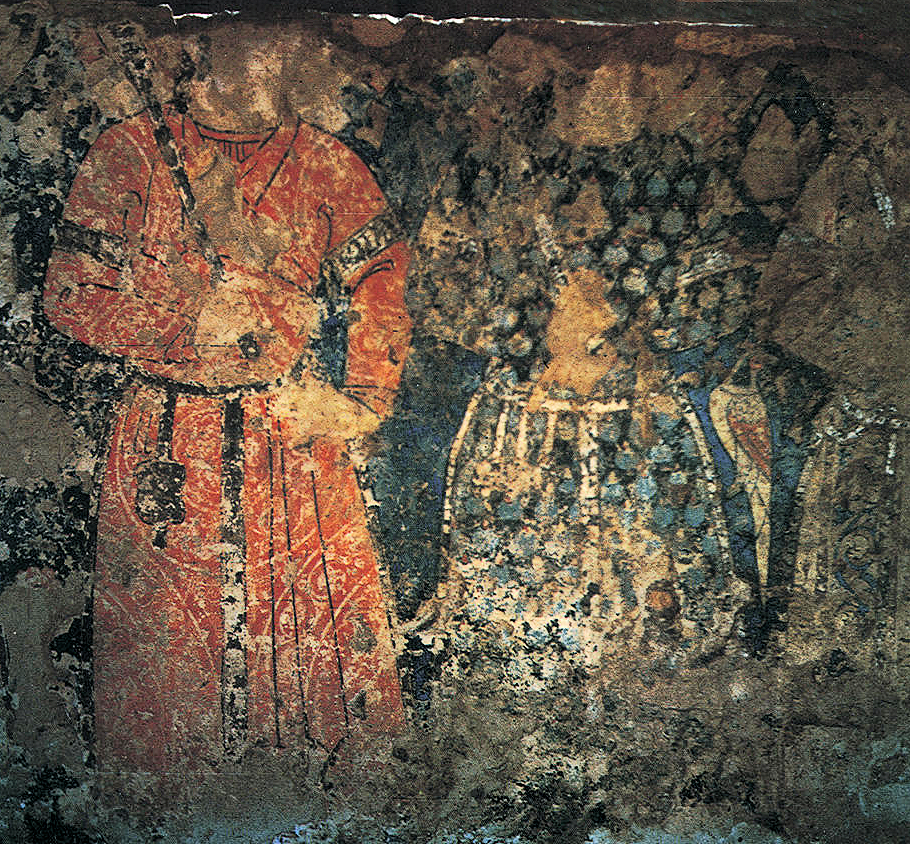
Figures in the wall paintings from the Ghaznavid palace of Lashkari Bazar, probably dating to the period of Mahmud of Ghazni. Black-and-white line drawing of the left figure, by the discoverer Daniel Schlumberger (1978). The figures wear the typical Turkic attire.

Sabuktigin lived as a mamluk, Turkic slave-soldier, (Note: The Ghaznavids were a dynasty of Turkic slave-soldiers...) during his youth and later married the daughter of his master Alptigin, who fled to Ghazna following a failed coup attempt, and conquered the city from the local Lawik rulers in 962. After Alptigin death, his son Abu Ishaq Ibrahim governed Ghazna for three years. His death was followed by the reign of a former ghulam of Alptigin, Bilgetigin. Bilgetigin's rule was so harsh the populace invited Abu Bakr Lawik back. It was through Sabuktigin's military ability that Lawik was removed, Bilgetigin was exiled, and Sabuktigin gained the governorship.

Once established as governor of Ghazna, Sabuktigin was asked to intervene in Khurasan, at the insistence of the Samanid emir, and after a victorious campaign received the governorships of Balkh, Tukharistan, Bamiyan, Ghur and Gharchistan. Sabuktigin inherited a governorship in turmoil. In Zabulistan, the typical military fief system (mustaghall) were being changed into permanent ownership (tamlik) which resulted in the Turkic soldiery unwilling to take up arms. Sabuktigin reformed the system making them all a mustaghall-type fief. In 976, he ended the conflict between two Turkic ghulams at Bust and restored the original ruler. Later that same year, Sabuktigin campaigned against Qusdar, catching the ruler(possibly Mu'tazz b. Ahmad) off guard and obtaining an annual tribute from him.

After the death of Sabuktigin, his son by Alptigin's daughter, Ismail, was given Ghazna. (Note: Kaushik Roy states Turkic nobles at Balkh chose Ismail as Emir.) Another son, Abu'l-Muzaffar Nasr, was given the governorship of Bust, while in Khorasan, the eldest son Mahmud, was given command of the army. Sabuktigin's intent was to ensure governorships for his family, despite the decaying influence of the Samanid Empire, and did not consider his dynasty as independent. Ismail, upon gaining his inheritance, quickly travelled to Bust and did homage to Emir Abu'l-Harith Mansur b. Nuh. Mahmud, who had been left out of any significant inheritance, proposed a division of power, to which Ismail refused. Mahmud marched on Ghazna and subsequently Ismail was defeated and captured in 998 at the Battle of Ghazni.

=== Mahmud of Ghazni ===
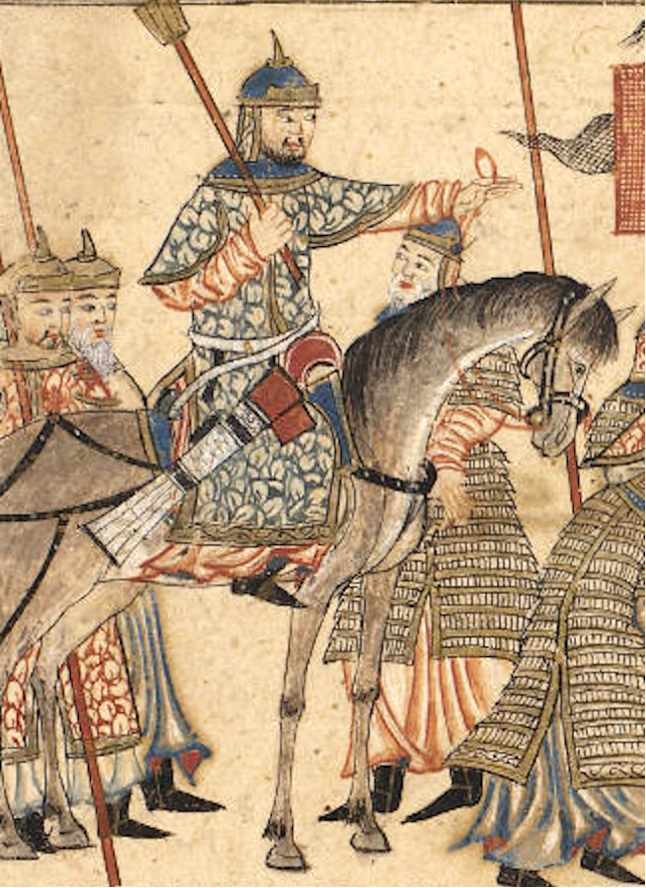
Mahmud of Ghazni. Jamiʿ al-Tawarikh, 1314-15

In 998, Mahmud, son of Sabuktigin, succeeded to the governorship, and Ghazni and the Ghaznavid dynasty became perpetually associated with him. He emphasized his loyalty in a letter to the caliph, saying that the Samanids had only been replaced because of their treason. Mahmud received the governorship of Khurasan and titles of Yamin al-Dawla and Amin al-Milla. As a representative of caliphal authority, he championed Sunni Islam by campaigning against the Ismaili and Shi'ite Buyids. He completed the conquest of the Samanid and Shahi territories, including the Ismaili Kingdom of Multan, Sindh, as well as some Buwayhid territory.

By all accounts, the rule of Mahmud was the golden age and height of the Ghaznavid Empire. Mahmud carried out seventeen expeditions through northern India to establish his control and set up tributary states, and his raids also resulted in the looting of a great deal of plunder. He established his authority from the borders of Ray to Samarkand, from the Caspian Sea to the Yamuna.

During Mahmud's reign (997–1030), the Ghaznavids settled 4,000 Turkmen families near Farana in Khorasan. By 1027, due to the Turkmen raiding neighbouring settlements, the governor of Tus, Arslan Jadhib, led military strikes against them. The Turkmen were defeated and scattered to neighbouring lands. Still, as late as 1033, Ghaznavid governor Tash Farrash executed fifty Turkmen chiefs for raids into Khorasan.

==== Indian conquests ====
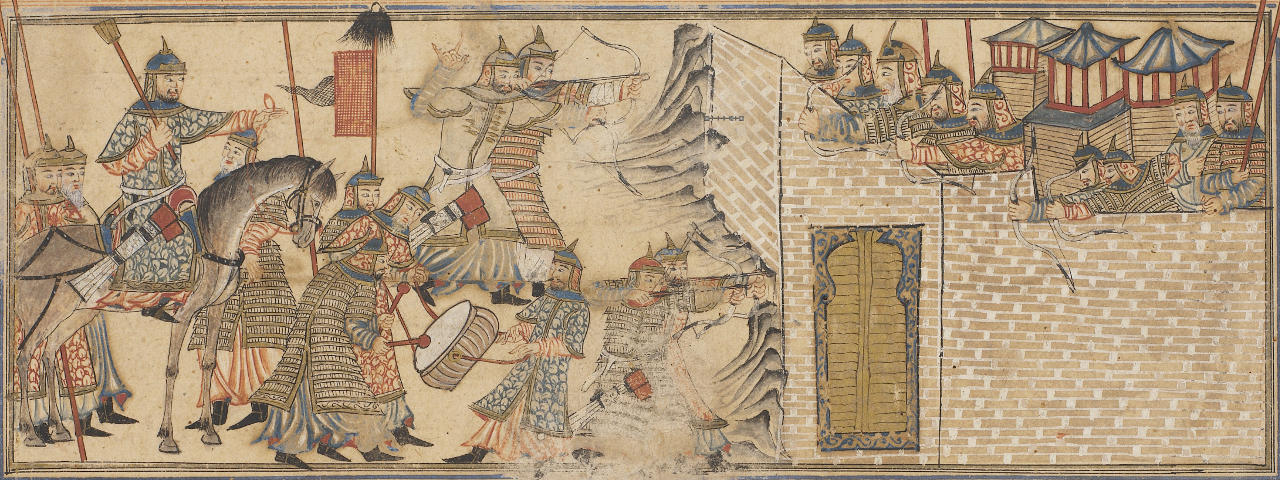
Mahmud of Ghazni conquering Qasdar (modern Khuzdar) in India. Jamiʿ al-Tawarikh

Mahmud of Ghazni led incursions deep into India, as far as Mathura, Kannauj and Somnath. In 1001, he defeated the Hindu Shahi in the Battle of Peshawar. In 1004-5, he invaded the Principality of Bhatiya and in 1006 the neighbouring Emirate of Multan. In 1008-9, he again vanquished the Hindu Shahis at the Battle of Chach, and established Governors in the conquered areas. In India, the Ghaznavids were called Turushkas ("Turks") or Hammiras (from the Arabic Amir "Commander").

In 1018, he laid waste the city of Mathura, which was "ruthlessly sacked, ravaged, desecrated and destroyed". According to Muhammad Qasim Hindu Shah, writing an "History of Hindustan" in the 16th-17th century, the city of Mathura was the richest in India. When it was attacked by Mahmud of Ghazni, "all the idols" were burnt and destroyed during a period of twenty days, gold and silver was smelted for booty, and the city was burnt down. In 1018 Mahmud also captured Kanauj, the capital of the Pratiharas, and then confronted the Chandelas, from whom he obtained the payment of tribute. In 1026, he raided and plundered the Somnath Temple, taking away a booty of 20 million dinars.

The wealth brought back from Mahmud's Indian expeditions to Ghazni was enormous, and contemporary historians (e.g., Abolfazl Beyhaghi, Ferdowsi) give glowing descriptions of the magnificence of the capital and of the conqueror's munificent support of literature. Mahmud died in April 1030 and had chosen his son, Mohammed, as his successor.

== Decline ==
=== Twin sons of Mahmud ===
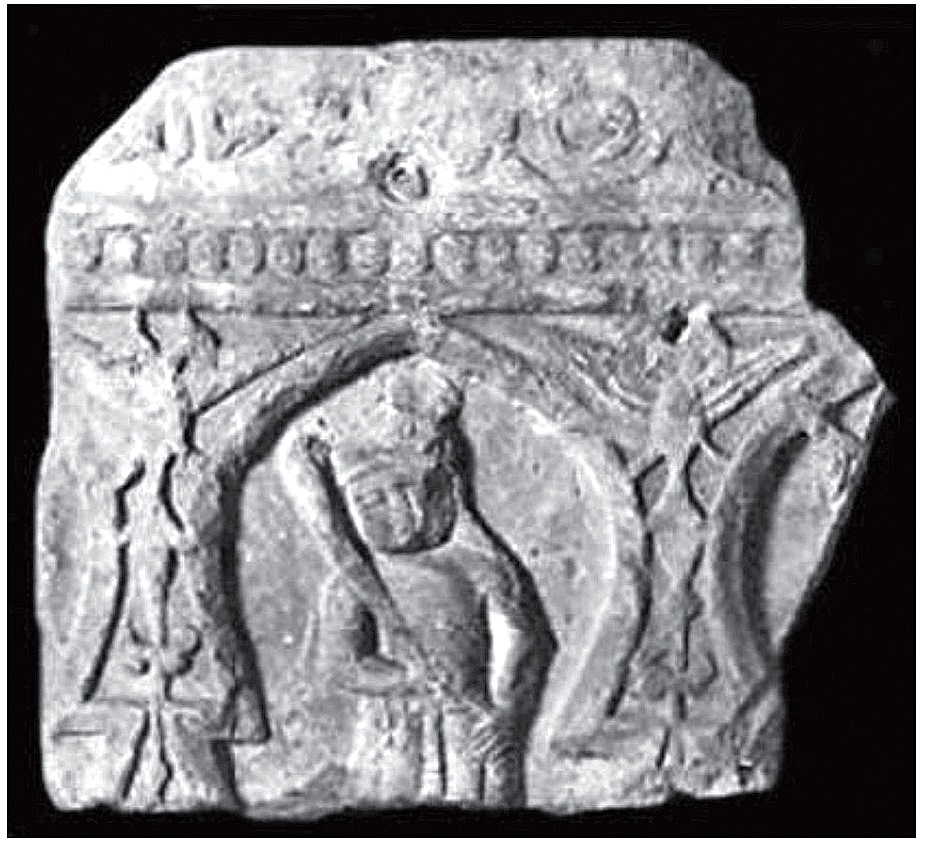
Dado panel with club-bearer and abraded inscription, possibly from Rawza, Ghazni. 11th-12th century (National Museum of Afghanistan Kabul, 1958, inv. no. KM58.2.X).

Mahmud left the empire to his son Mohammed, who was mild, affectionate and soft. His brother, Mas'ud, asked for three provinces that he had won by his sword, but his brother did not consent. Mas'ud had to fight his brother, and he became king, blinding and imprisoning Mohammed as punishment. Mas'ud was unable to preserve the empire and following a disastrous defeat at the Battle of Dandanaqan in 1040, he lost all the Ghaznavid lands in Persia and Central Asia to the Seljuks, plunging the realm into a "time of troubles". His last act was to collect all his treasures from his forts in hope of assembling an army and ruling from India, but his own forces plundered the wealth and he proclaimed his blind brother as king again. The two brothers now exchanged positions: Mohammed was elevated from prison to the throne, while Mas'ud was consigned to a dungeon after a reign of ten years and was assassinated in 1040. Mas'ud's son, Madood, was governor of Balkh, and in 1040, after hearing of his father's death, he came to Ghazni to claim his kingdom. He fought with the sons of the blind Mohammed and was victorious. However, the empire soon disintegrated and most kings did not submit to Madood. In a span of nine years, four more kings claimed the throne of Ghazni.

=== Ibrahim ===
In 1058, Mas'ud's son Ibrahim, a great calligrapher who wrote the Koran with his own pen, became king. Ibrahim re-established a truncated empire on a firmer basis by arriving at a peace agreement with the Seljuks and a restoration of cultural and political linkages. Under Ibrahim and his successors the empire enjoyed a period of sustained tranquility. Shorn of its western land, it was increasingly sustained by riches accrued from raids across Northern India, where it faced stiff resistance from Indian rulers such as the Paramara of Malwa and the Gahadvala of Kannauj. He ruled until 1098.

=== Mas'ud III ===
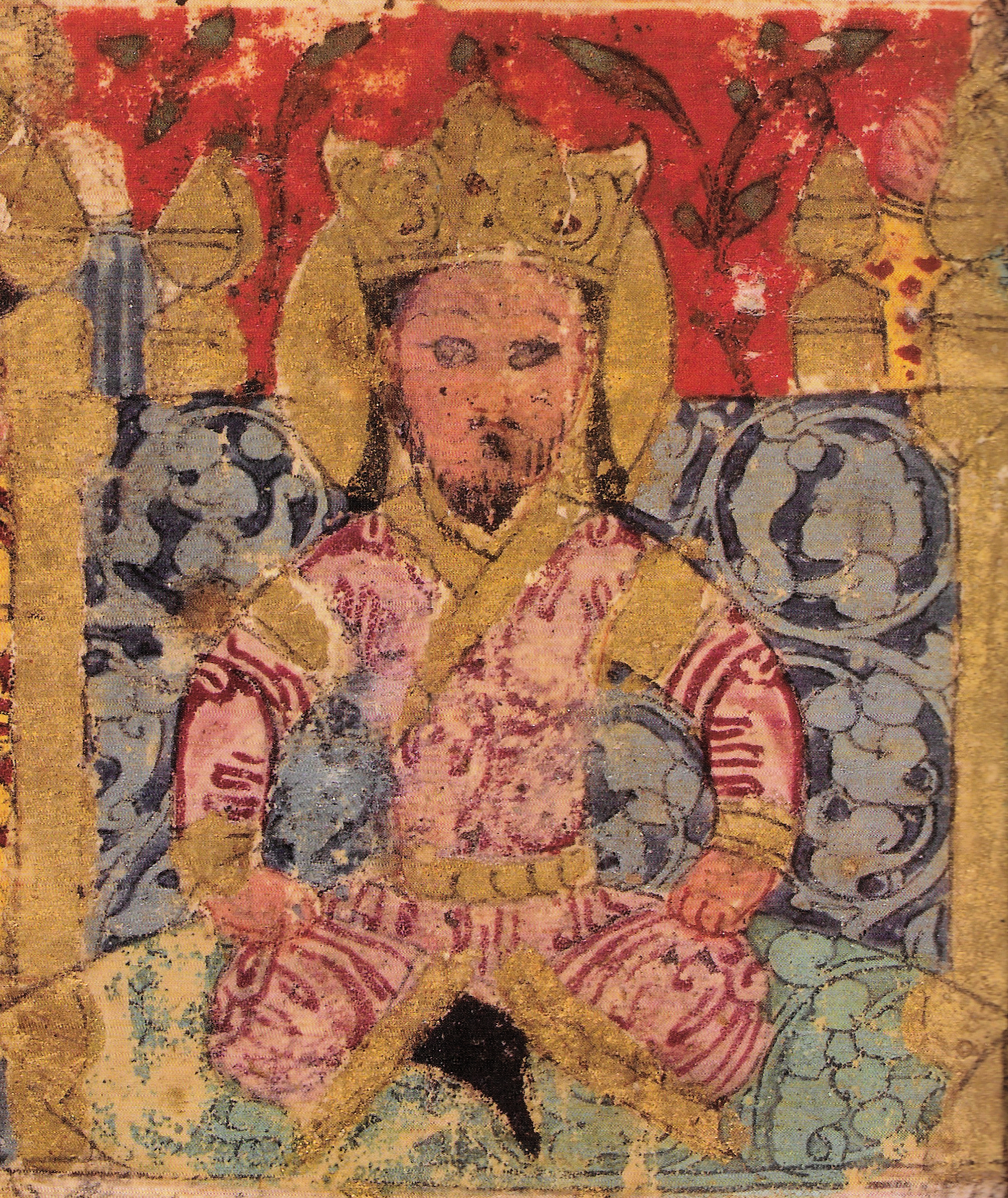
Portrait of Ghaznavid ruler Bahrām Shāh (d. 1152), (Kalila and Dimna, folio 6a, end of 13th century, Topkapi H.363).

Mas'ud III became king for sixteen years, with no major event in his lifetime, prolonging the period of peace established by his predecessor Ibrahim.

Mas'ud built the Palace of Sultan Mas'ud III and one of the Ghazni Minarets. Signs of weakness in the state became apparent when he died in 1115, with internal strife between his sons ending with the ascension of Sultan Bahram Shah as a Seljuk vassal. Bahram Shah defeated his brother Arslan for the throne at the Battle of Ghazni in 1117.

=== Sultan Bahram Shah ===
Sultan Bahram Shah was the last Ghaznavid King, ruling Ghazni, the first and main Ghaznavid capital, for thirty-five years. In 1148 he was defeated in Ghazni by Sayf al-Din Suri, but he recaptured the capital the next year. Ala al-Din Husayn, a Ghorid King, conquered the city in 1151, in revenge for his brother Kutubbuddin's death, who was son-in-law of the king but was publicly punished and killed for a minor offence. Ala al-Din Husayn then razed the city, burning it for 7 days, after which he became known as "Jahānsuz" (World Burner). Ghazni was restored to the Ghaznavids by the intervention of the Seljuks, who came to the aid of Bahram. Ghaznavid struggles with the Ghurids continued in subsequent years as they nibbled away at Ghaznavid territory, and Ghazni and Zabulistan were lost to a group of Oghuz Turks before being captured by the Ghurids. Ghazni fell to the Ghurids around 1170.

=== Late Ghaznavids ===
The last Ghaznavid king Khusrau Malik had his capital in Lahore, Punjab, until the Ghurid invasion of the subcontinent.

After the fall of Ghazni in 1163, the Ghaznavids established themselves in Lahore, their regional capital for Indian territories since its conquest by Mahmud of Ghazni, which became the new capital of the Late Ghaznavids. Ghaznavid power in northwestern India continued until the Ghurid conquest of Lahore by Muhammad of Ghor in 1186, deposing the last Ghaznavid ruler Khusrau Malik. Both Khusrau Malik and his son were imprisoned and summarily executed in Firozkoh in 1191, extinguishing the Ghaznavid lineage.

== Military and tactics ==
The core of the Ghaznavid army was primarily made up of Turks, as well as thousands of native Afghans who were trained and assembled from the area south of the Hindu Kush in what is now Afghanistan. During the rule of Sultan Mahmud, a new, larger military training center was established in Bost (now Lashkar Gah). This area was known for blacksmiths where war weapons were made. After capturing and conquering the Punjab region, the Ghaznavids began to employ Hindus in their army.

Ghaznavid soldiers, circa 1100 (Cleveland Museum of Art, 1980.179)

The Indian soldiers, whom Romila Thapar presumed to be Hindus, were one of the components of the army with their commander called sipahsalar-i-Hinduwan and lived in their own quarter of Ghazna practicing their own religion. Indian soldiers under their commander Suvendhray remained loyal to Mahmud. They were also used against a Turkic rebel, with the command given to a Hindu named Tilak according to Baihaki.

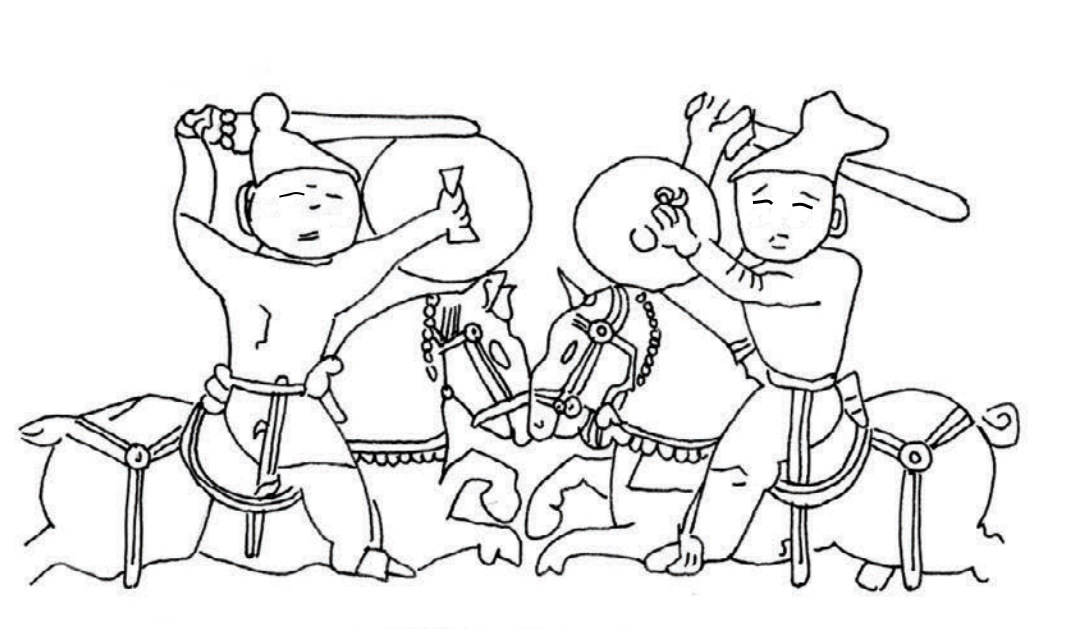
Confronted warriors. Drawing from carved marble relief from Ghazna, Ghaznawid, c.1100 CE. David Collection, inv. 22/1989, Copenhagen, Denmark.

Like the other dynasties that arose out of the remains of the Abbasid Caliphate, the Ghaznavid administrative traditions and military practice came from the Abbasids. The Arabian horses, at least in the earliest campaign, were still substantial in Ghaznavid military incursions, especially in dashing raids deep into hostile territory. There is a record of '6000 Arab horse' being sent against king Anandapala in 1008, and evidence of this Arabian cavalry persists until 1118 under the Ghaznavid governor in Lahore.

Due to their access to the Indus-Ganges plains, the Ghaznavids, during the 11th and 12th centuries, developed the first Muslim army to use war elephants in battle. The elephants were protected by armour plating on their fronts. The use of these elephants was a foreign weapon in other regions that the Ghaznavids fought in, particularly in Central Asia.

== State and culture ==
Although the dynasty was of Central Asian Turkic origin, it was thoroughly Persianised in terms of language, culture, literature and habits (Note: "The Ghaznavids inherited Samanid administrative, political, and cultural traditions and laid the foundations for a Persianate state in northern India. ...") (Note: Nizam al-Mulk also attempted to organise the Saljuq administration according to the Persianate Ghaznavid model.) and has been regarded as a "Persian dynasty". (Note: Firdawsi was writing his Shah-nama. One of the effects of the renaissance of the Persian spirit evoked by this work was that the Ghaznavids were also persianized and thereby became a Persian dynasty") The official religion of Ghaznavids was Sunni Islam and Hanafi law of school (fiqh).

According to Clifford Edmund Bosworth:

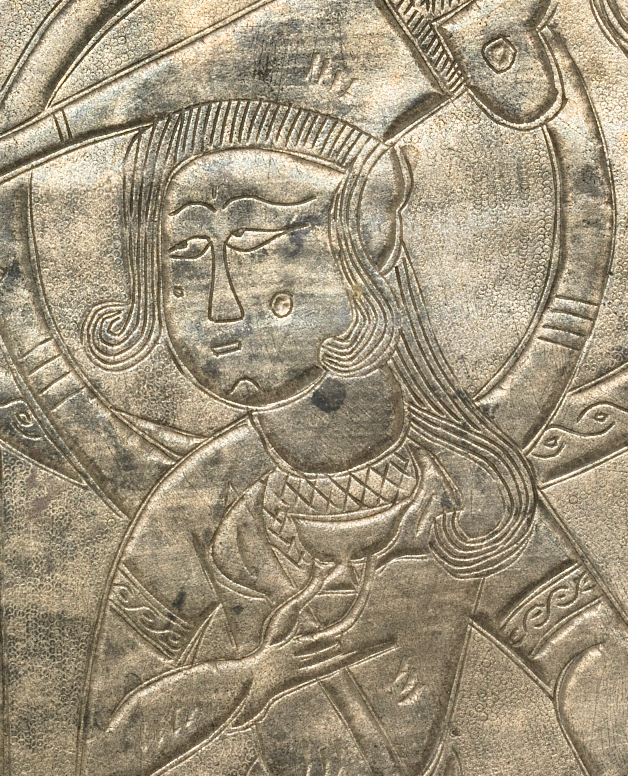
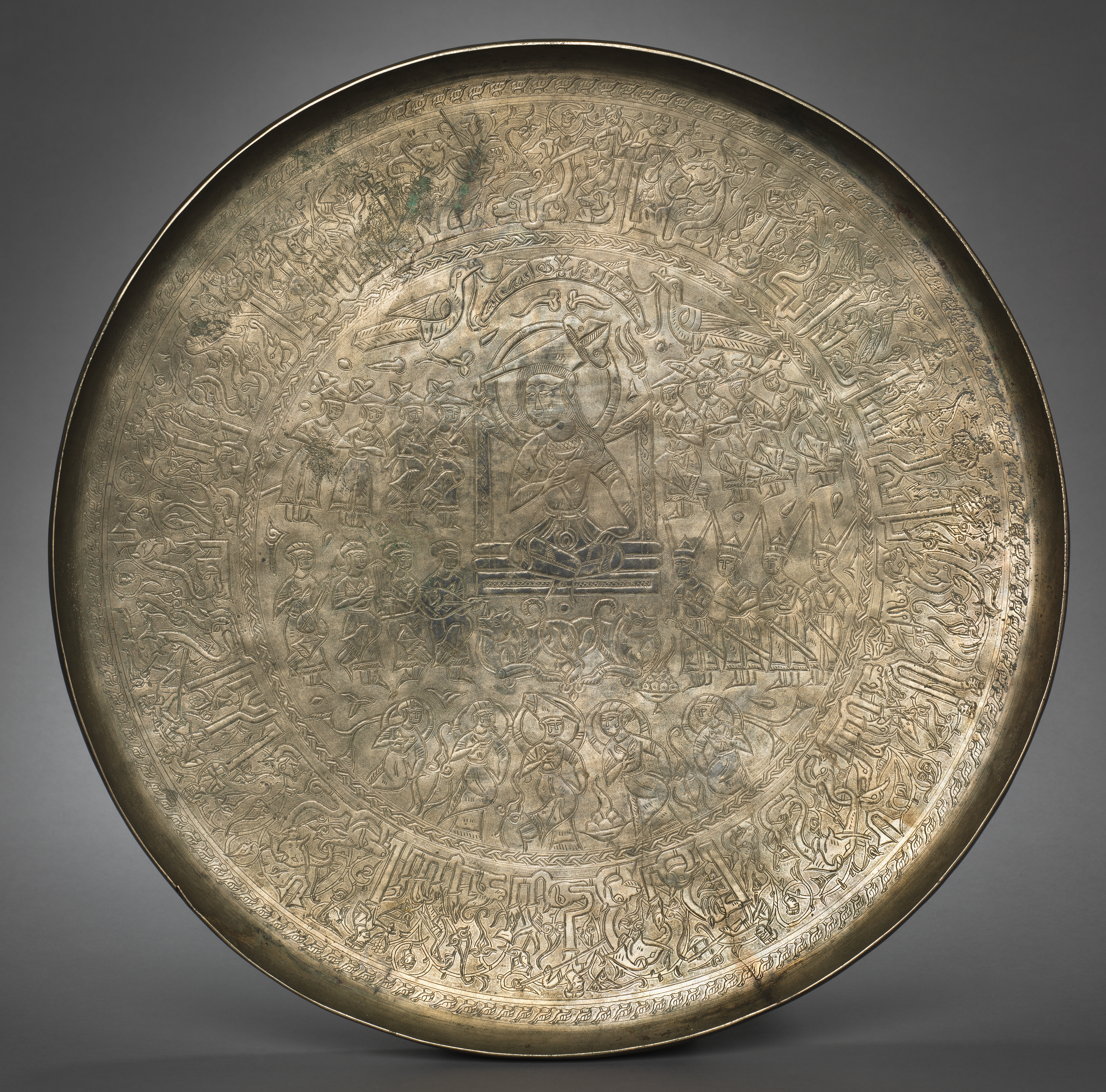
Ghaznavid Sultan and his court, on a brass salver plate. Dated circa 1100, Ghaznavid period, Afghanistan, probably Herat or Ghazni. Cleveland Museum of Art. The sultan is seated in the traditional cross-legged Turkish posture, and "the round faces and almond eyes of the figures reflect the Turkish facial type of that period". Inscriptions in Arabic.

The Ghaznavid sultans were ethnically Turkish, but the sources, all in Arabic or Persian, do not allow us to estimate the persistence of Turkish practices and ways of thought amongst them. Yet given the fact that the essential basis of the Ghaznavids' military support always remained their Turkish soldiery, there must always have been a need to stay attuned to their troops' needs and aspirations; also, there are indications of the persistence of some Turkish literary culture under the early Ghaznavids (Köprülüzade, pp. 56–57). The sources do make it clear, however, that the sultans' exercise of political power and the administrative apparatus which gave it shape came very speedily to be within the Perso-Islamic tradition of statecraft and monarchical rule, with the ruler as a distant figure, buttressed by divine favor, ruling over a mass of traders, artisans, peasants, etc., whose prime duty was obedience in all respects but above all in the payment of taxes. The fact that the personnel of the bureaucracy which directed the day-to-day running of the state, and which raised the revenue to support the sultans' life-style and to finance the professional army, were Persians who carried on the administrative traditions of the Samanids, only strengthened this conception of secular power.

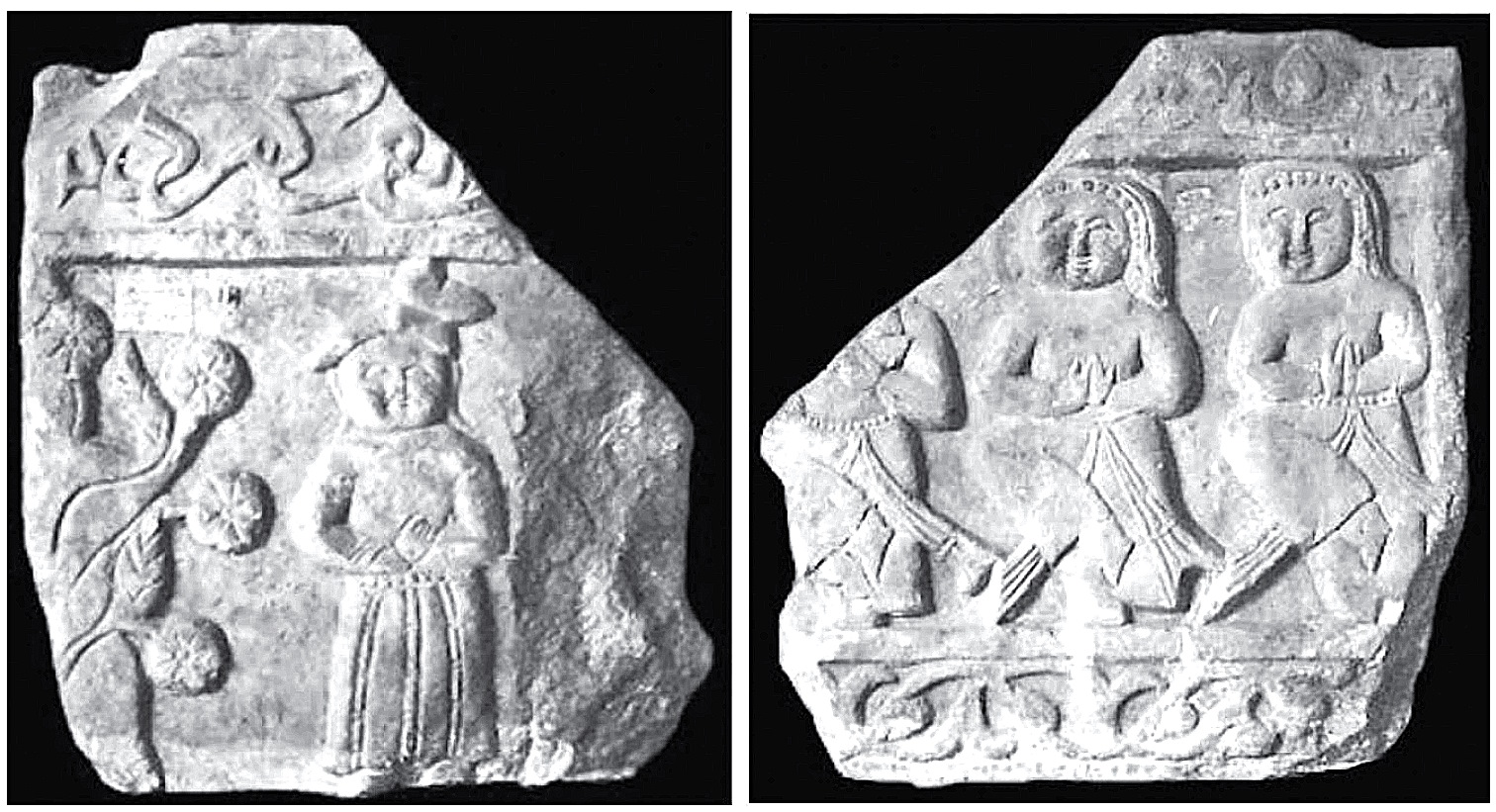
Frieze from Ghazni, depicting Ghanavids with round faces and prominent cheekbones, wearing Turkic clothes. 11th-12th century, Kabul Museum (inv. 58.2.1). The inscription is in Persian.

Persianisation of the state apparatus was accompanied by the Persianisation of high culture at the Ghaznavid court... The level of literary creativity was just as high under Ebrāhīm and his successors up to Bahrāmšāh, with such poets as Abu’l-Faraj Rūnī, Sanāʾī, ʿOṯmān Moḵtārī, Masʿūd-e Saʿd-e Salmān, and Sayyed Ḥasan Ḡaznavī. We know from the biographical dictionaries of poets (taḏkera-ye šoʿarā) that the court in Lahore of Ḵosrow Malek had an array of fine poets, none of whose dīvāns has unfortunately survived, and the translator into elegant Persian prose of Ebn Moqaffaʿ’s Kalīla wa Demna, namely Abu’l-Maʿālī Naṣr-Allāh b. Moḥammad, served the sultan for a while as his chief secretary. The Ghaznavids thus present the phenomenon of a dynasty of Turkish slave origin which became culturally Persianised to a perceptibly higher degree than other contemporary dynasties of Turkish origin such as Saljuqs and Qarakhanids.

Persian literary culture enjoyed a renaissance under the Ghaznavids during the 11th century. The Ghaznavid court was so renowned for its support of Persian literature that the poet Farrukhi traveled from his home province to work for them. The poet Unsuri's short collection of poetry was dedicated to Sultan Mahmud and his brothers Nasr and Yaqub. Another poet of the Ghaznavid court, Manuchehri, wrote numerous poems about the merits of drinking wine.

Sultan Mahmud, modelling the Samanid Bukhara as a cultural center, made Ghazni into a center of learning, inviting Ferdowsi and al-Biruni. He even attempted to persuade Avicenna, but was refused. Mahmud preferred that his fame and glory be publicized in Persian and hundreds of poets assembled at his court. He brought whole libraries from Rayy and Isfahan to Ghazni and even demanded that the Khwarizmshah court send its men of learning to Ghazni. Due to his invasion of Rayy and Isfahan, Persian literary production was inaugurated in Azerbaijan and Iraq.

The Ghaznavids continued to develop historical writing in Persian that had been initiated by their predecessors, the Samanid Empire. The historian Abu'l-Fadl Bayhaqi's Tarikh-e Beyhaqi, written in the latter half of the 11th century, is an example.

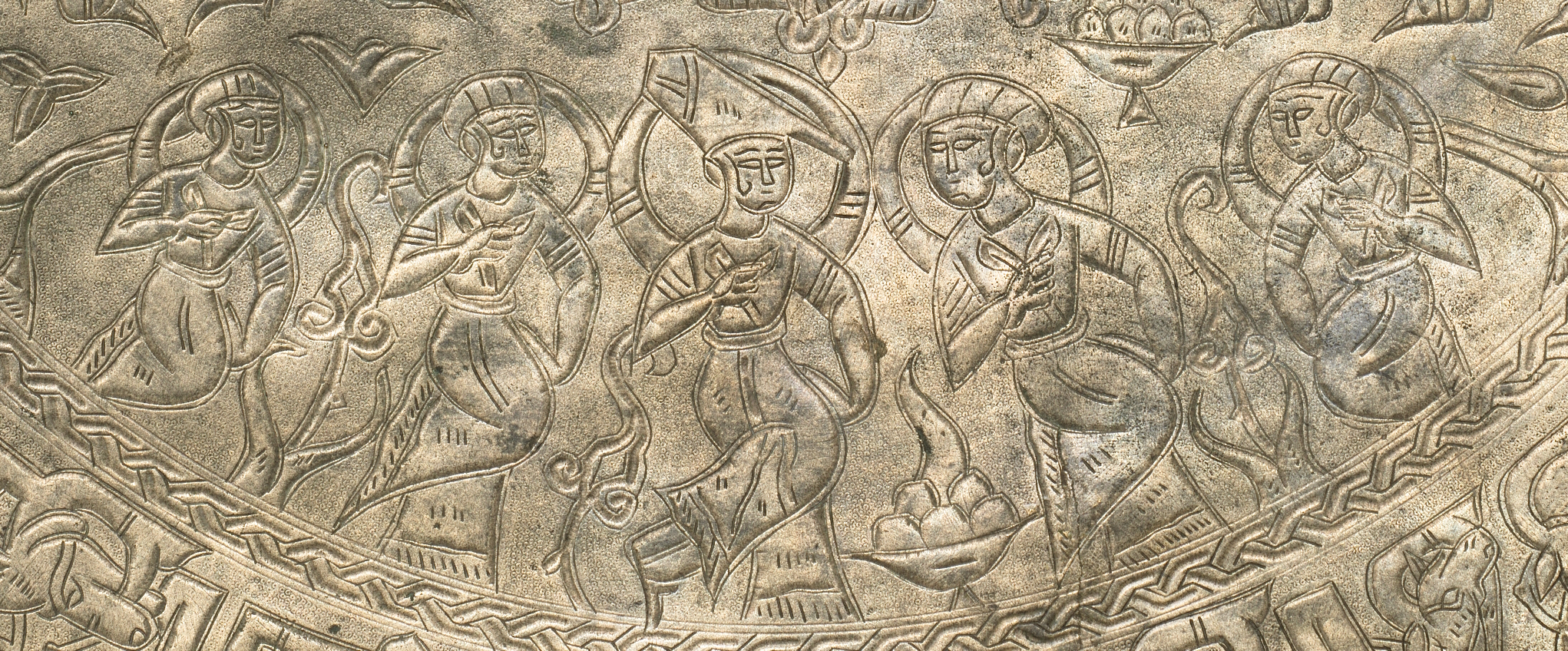
Ghaznavid court scene, circa 1100 (Cleveland Museum of Art, 1980.179)

Although the Ghaznavids were Turkic and their military leaders were generally of the same stock, as a result of the original involvement of Sabuktigin and Mahmud of Ghazni in Samanid affairs and in the Samanid cultural environment, the dynasty became thoroughly Persianized, so that in practice one cannot consider their rule over Iran one of foreign domination. They also copied their administrative system from the Samanids. In terms of cultural championship and the support of Persian poets, they were more Persian than their ethnically-Iranian rivals, the Buyid dynasty, whose support of Arabic letters in preference to Persian is well known.

The 16th century Persian historian, Firishta, records Sabuktigin's genealogy as descended from the Sasanian kings: "Subooktu-geen, the son of Jookan, the son of Kuzil-Hukum, the son of Kuzil-Arslan, the son of Ferooz, the son of Yezdijird, king of Persia." However, modern historians believe this was an attempt to connect himself with the history of old Persia.

Historian Bosworth explains: "In fact with the adoption of Persian administrative and cultural ways the Ghaznavids threw off their original Turkish steppe background and became largely integrated with the Perso-Islamic tradition." As a result, Ghazni developed into a great centre of Arabic learning.

With Sultan Mahmud's invasions of North India, Persian culture was established at Lahore, which later produced the famous poet, Masud Sa'd Salman. Lahore, under Ghaznavid rule in the 11th century, attracted Persian scholars from Khorasan, India and Central Asia and became a major Persian cultural centre. One of the most significant early works on Sufism, the Kashf al-mahjub, was written in Lahore by Abu al-Hasan Hujwiri al-Ghaznawi. It was also during Mahmud's reign that Ghaznavid coinage began to have bilingual legends consisting of Arabic and Devanagari script. The entire range of Persianate institutions and customs that would come to characterize the political economy of most of India would be implemented by the later Ghaznavids.

The Persian culture established by the Ghaznavids in Ghazna and Eastern Afghanistan survived the Ghurid invasion in the 12th century and endured until the invasion of the Mongols.

== Art and Architecture ==
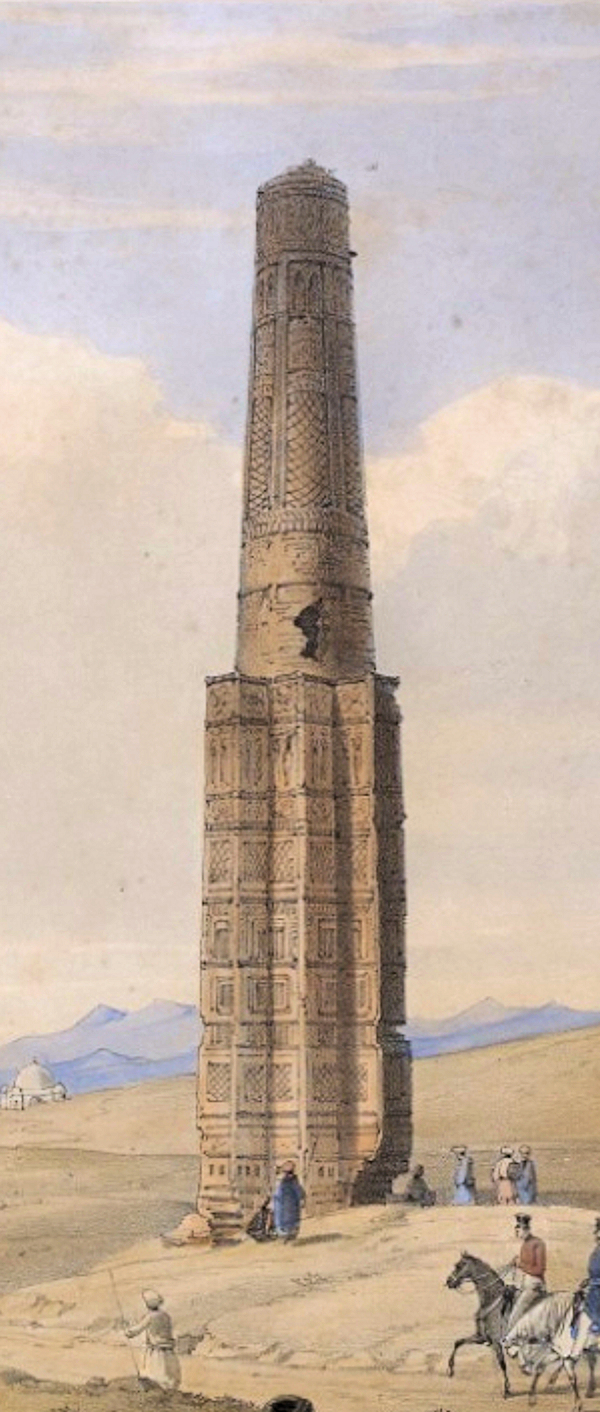
Mas'ud III's minaret in Ghazni was at least 44 meters tall, before its top half crumbled in 1902 due to an earthquake. It was built between 1099 and 1115 CE. It stood next to the Palace of Sultan Mas'ud III.

During the Ghaznavid era, artistic production was at its height, due to increased patronage from elites and the economic benefits of spoils gained from increasing raids and forced tributes from India. The height of which being the attack on the Somnath Temple in Kathiawar peninsula, resulting in a large hoard of treasure being taken into the empire. Ghaznavid art focused on adapting ancient artistic techniques to new materials and mediums, especially in the etching of precious metals, to leave a lasting impression on the Islamic art world. In the plastic arts, bronze-works appear to be influenced by earlier Samanid pieces, yet are unique enough that early versions of trademarks are visible on some pieces. Two bronze ewers, analysed by Eva Baer, denote an influence from more contemporary ceramics in their shape and construction, while bearing both archaic methods of hatching and novel "oval... with a triangular base" designs, along with the artist’s signatures.

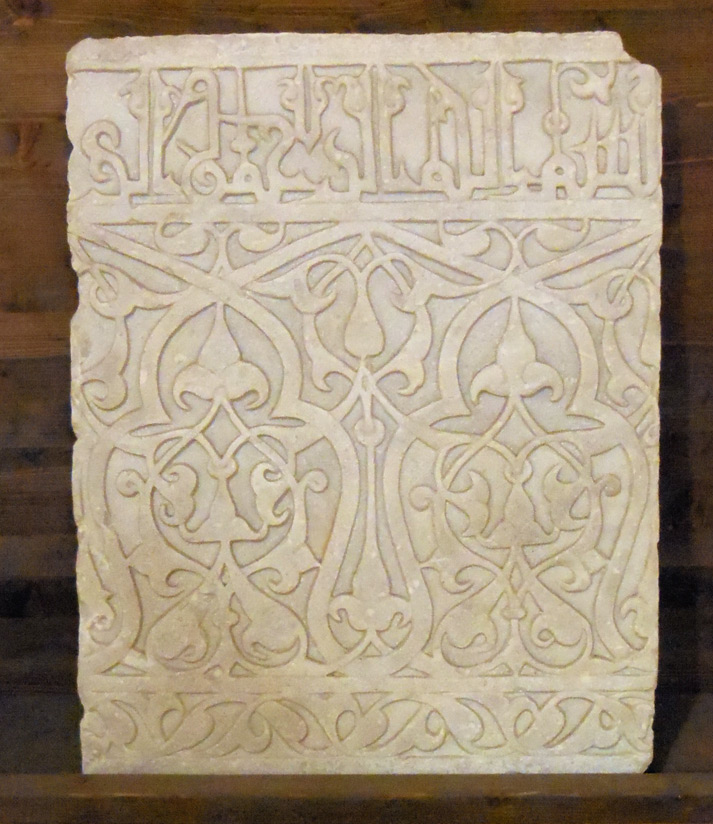
Marble wall border, Palace of Sultan Mas'ud III, Ghazni, Afghanistan, 12th century CE.

Other works such as the garden murals added by Mas'ud I in the Herat palace complex had representational depictions including lewd subject matter of nude figures in "convivial" scenes. The capital, Ghazni, was also considered a center for lyrical poetry in the eastern Islamic world due to poets being able to form genres and styles over a long period of time.

Ghaznavid architecture was especially able to flourish, specifically in marble reliefs with geometric, vegetal, and epigraphic designs. Due to their capital, Ghazni, being near an important trade route it resulted in influences from all aver the region. Near the Palace of Mas'ud III there is a minaret that was constructed of baked and unbaked pressed clay bricks and it is surrounded by a courtyard with four iwans. Excavations at this sites courtyard have uncovered numerous carved marble panels that feature trefoil arches, scrollwork, and inscriptions in Persian and Arabic. One of the more celebrated works is a marble panel from the courtyard of Sultan Mas'ud III's palace, now in the Brooklyn Museum, which has a Kufic script above intricate vegetal motifs. The use of marble instead of more common stucco or brick along with detailed calligraphy reflect both the Ghaznavids' wealth and their artistry.

=== Symbols ===
Since the time of Mahmud till Bahram-Shah of Ghazna, black banner with an image of a lion were used. Mahmud and his successors received diplomas, titles, and banners from the Abbasid Caliphs in recognition of their sovereignty and victories. Since the Abbasids used black banners, these were likely sent to the Ghaznavids. Unsuri suggests that Mahmud, like his descendants, bore a lion's image on his banner. His grandson Ibrahim is also said to have carried a lion emblem, confirming the continuity of this symbol. The Seljuks also carried banners bearing a lion's image, and it is possible that Ibrahim adopted the symbol under their influence, since he had to ally with Malik Shah. Before his time, there is no clear evidence of such imagery even in the verses referring to Mahmud. About Sanjar's banner, several verses of poet Anvari describe the lion emblem, and later petty rulers such as Firoz Shah and Malik Shah likewise used banners with the lion motif. Like Mahmud, also used the crescent as a symbol on his banner. He carried a black canopy and a white crown, while Mas'ud III had a falcon on his canopy. These emblems, noted by poets such as Sayyid Hasan, highlight the continuity of symbolic imagery within the Ghaznavid dynasty.

== Legacy ==
The Ghaznavids and other polities in continental Asia c. 1100

At its height, the Ghaznavid empire grew from the Oxus to the Indus Valley and was ruled from 977 to 1186. The history of the empire, Tarikh Yamini, was written by Muhammad ibn Abd al-Jabbar al-Utbi, who documented the Ghaznavid's achievements, including regaining lost territory from their rivals, the Kara-Khanids, in present-day Iran and Afghanistan.

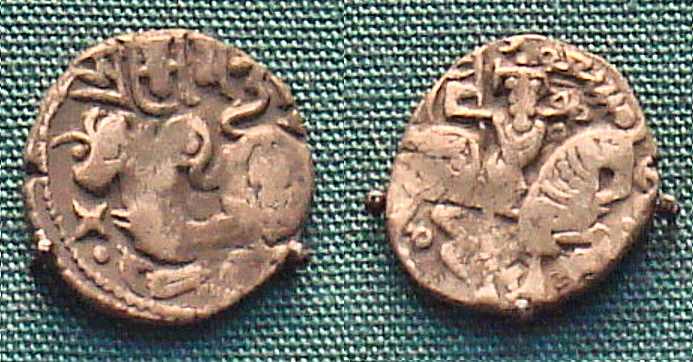
Coinage of Mas'ud I of Ghazni (1030–1041), derived from Hindu Shahi designs, with the name of Mas'ud (Persian: مسعود) around the head of the horserider.

In addition to the wealth accumulated through raiding Indian cities, and exacting tribute from Indian rajas, the Ghaznavids also benefited from their position as an intermediary along the trade routes between China and the Mediterranean. The Ghaznavid rulers are generally credited with spreading Islam into the Indian subcontinent.

They were, however, unable to hold power for long and by 1040 the Seljuk Empire had taken over their Persian domains and a century later the Ghurids took over their remaining sub-continental lands.

The Ghaznavid conquests facilitated the beginning of the Turko-Afghan period into India, which would be further conducted by the Ghurids until the Turko-Afghans successfully established themselves in the Delhi Sultanate.

== List of rulers ==
| # | Laqab | Personal Name | Reign | Succession right | Notes |
|---|---|---|---|---|---|
| 1 | Nasir-ud-din نصر الدين; Defender of the Faith | Sabuktigin | 977–997 | | |
| 2 | No title | Ismail | 997–998 | son of Sabuktigin | |
| 3 | Yamin ad-Dawlah Abu Qasim یمین الدولہ ابو لقاسم; Right-hand man of the State | Mahmud | 998–1030 | first son of Sabuktigin | |
| 4 | Jalal ad-Dawlah جلال الدولہ; Dignity of the State | Muhammad | 1030; 1st reign | second son of Mahmud | |
| 5 | Shihab ad-Dawlah شھاب الدولہ; Star of the State | Masud I | 1030–1041 | first son of Mahmud | Was overthrown, imprisoned and executed, following the battle of Dandanaqan |
| — | Jalal ad-Dawlah جلال الدولہ; Dignity of the State | Muhammad | 1041; 2nd reign | second son of Mahmud | Raised to the throne following the removal of Masud I. |
| 6 | Shihab ad-Dawlah شھاب الدولہ; Star of the State | Mawdud | 1041–1048 | son of Masud I | Defeated Muhammad at the battle of Nangrahar and gained the throne. |
| 7 | ? ? | Masud II | 1048 | son of Mawdud | |
| 8 | Baha ad-Dawlah بھاء الدولہ; Splendor of the State | Ali | 1048–1049 | son of Masud I | |
| 9 | Izz ad-Dawlah عز الدولہ; Glory of the State | Abd al-Rashid | 1049–1052 | fifth son of Mahmud | |
| 10 | Qiwam ad-Dawlah قوام الدولہ; Support of the State | Toghrul | 1052–1053 | Turkish mamluk general | Usurped the Ghaznavid throne after massacring Abd al-Rashid and eleven other Ghaznavid princes. |
| 11 | Jamal ad-Dawlah جمال الدولہ; Beauty of the state | Farrukh-Zad | 1053–1059 | son of Masud I | |
| 12 | Zahir ad-Dawlah ظھیر الدولہ; Help of the State | Ibrahim | 1059–1099 | son of Masud I | |
| 13 | Ala ad-Dawlah علاء الدولہ; Blessing of the State | Mas'ūd III | 1099–1115 | son of Ibrahim | |
| 14 | Kamal ad-Dawlah کمال الدولہ; Perfection of the State | Shir-Zad | 1115–1116 | son of Masud III | Murdered by his younger brother Arslan ibn Mas'ud. |
| 15 | Sultan ad-Dawlah سلطان الدولہ; Sultan of the state | Arslan-Shah | 1116–1117 | son of Masud III | Took the throne from his older brother Shirzad, but faced a rebellion from his other brother Bahram Shah, who was supported by the sultan of the Great Seljuq Empire, Ahmad Sanjar. |
| 16 | Yamin ad-Dawlah یمین الدولہ; Right-hand man of the state | Bahram Shah | 1117–1157 | son of Masud III | Under Bahram-Shah, the Ghaznavid empire became a tributary of the Great Seljuq Empire. Bahram was assisted by Ahmad Sanjar, sultan of the Great Seljuq empire, in securing his throne. |
| 17 | Muizz ad-Dawlah معزالدولہ; Honor of the State | Khusrau Shah | 1157–1160 | son of Bahram-Shah | |
| 18 | Taj ad-Dawlah تاج الدولہ; Crown of the state | Khusrau Malik | 1160–1186 | son of Khusrau-Shah | |

== Family tree of the Ghaznavid sultans ==
Ghaznavid sultans family tree

Qara Bajkam
Sabuktigin (r. 977–997); Emir of Ghazna | Bughrachuq (died 998); Governor of Herat
Mahmud (r. 998–1030); Sultan of Ghazna | Nasr (997– ?); Governor of Bust | Ismail (r. 997–998); Emir of Ghazna | Yusuf | Hurra-yi Khuttali; Princess married Mamunid ruler Ma'mun II.
Muhammad (r. 1030, 1041); Sultan of Ghazna | Masʽud I (r. 1030–1041); Sultan of Ghazna | Abd al-Rashid (r. 1049–1052); Sultan of Ghazna
'Abd al-Rahman | Ahmad
Mawdud (r. 1041–1048); Sultan of Ghazna | Ali (r. 1048–1049); Sultan of Ghazna | Farrukh-Zad (r. 1053–1059); Sultan of Ghazna | Ibrahim (r. 1059–1099); Sultan of Ghazna | Majdud | Mardan-shah | Izad-yar | Sa'id
Mas'ud II (r. 1048); Sultan of Ghazna | Mas'ud III (r. 1099–1115); Sultan of Ghazna
Shir-Zad (r. 1115–1116); Sultan of Ghazna | Arslan-Shah (r. 1116–1117); Sultan of Ghazna | Bahram-Shah (r. 1117–1157); Sultan of Ghazna
Khusrau-Shah (r. 1157–1160); Sultan of Ghazna
Khusrau Malik (r. 1160–1186); Sultan of Ghazna

Notes:
- http://www.iranicaonline.org/articles/ghaznavids Table 1. Genealogical chart of the Ghaznavid rulers.
- C.E. Bosworth, The Ghaznavids:994–1040, Edinburgh University Press, 1963.

== See also ==
- List of battles involving the Ghaznavid Empire
- History of Afghanistan
- History of Pakistan
- List of Sunni Muslim dynasties

== Sources ==
- Khan, Ghulam Mustafa (1949). "A History of Bahram Shah of Ghaznin". Islamic Culture. Vol. XXIII no. 1-4. Hyderabad: The Islamic Culture Board. pp. 62–199.
- Ahmadi, Wali (2004). "The Institution of Persian Literature and the Genealogy of Bahar's "Stylistics"". British Journal of Middle Eastern Studies. 31 (2 (Nov.)). Taylor & Francis, Ltd.
- Alam, Muzaffar; Nalini, Françoise Delvoye; Gaborieau, Marc (2000). The making of Indo-Persian Culture: Indian and French Studies. Manohar Publishers & Distributors.
- Amirsoleimani, Soheila (1999). "Truths and Lies: Irony and Intrigue in the Tārīkh-i Bayhaqī: The Uses of Guile: Literary and Historical Moments". Iranian Studies. 32 (2, Spring). Taylor & Francis, Ltd. doi:10.1080/00210869908701955.
- Arjomand, Said Amir (2012). "Patrimonial state". In Böwering, Gerhard; Crone, Patricia; Mirza, Mahan (eds.). The Princeton Encyclopedia of Islamic Political Thought. Princeton University Press.
- Asher, Catherine B.; Talbot, Cynthia (2006). India Before Europe. Cambridge University Press.
- Bosworth, C.E. (1963). The Ghaznavids: 994–1040. Edinburgh University Press.
- Bosworth, C.E. (1968). "The Development of Persian Culture under the Early Ghaznavids". Iran. 6. Taylor & Francis, Ltd.: 33–44. doi:10.2307/4299599. JSTOR 4299599.
- Bosworth, C.E. (1975). "The Early Ghaznavids". In Bosworth, C. E. (ed.). The Cambridge History of Iran. Vol. 4. Cambridge University Press.
- Bosworth, Clifford Edmund (1977). The Later Ghaznavids: Splendour and Decay. Edinburgh University Press. ISBN 978-0-85224-315-2.
- Bosworth, C.E. (1994). "Rulers of Makrān and Quṣdār in the Early Islamic Period". Studia Iranica. 23 (2). Peeters Publishers: 199–209. doi:10.2143/SI.23.2.2014304.
- Bosworth, C.E. (1996). The New Islamic Dynasties. Columbia University Press.
- Asimov, M.S.; Bosworth, C.E., eds. (1998). History of Civilizations of Central Asia. Vol. IV, part 1:The historical, social and economic setting. UNESCO. ISBN 978-92-3-103467-1.
- Bosworth, C.E. (2006). "Ghaznavids". Encyclopaedia Iranica.
- Eaton, Richard M. (2019). India in the Persianate Age: 1000–1765. Penguin UK. ISBN 978-0-14-196655-7.
- Houtsma, Martijn Theodoor (1987). E.J. Brill's first encyclopaedia of Islam, 1913–1936. Vol. 2. BRILL. p. 151. ISBN 978-90-04-08265-6.
- Katouzian, Homa (2003). Iranian history and politics:The Dialectic of State and Society. Routledge.
- Kennedy, Hugh (1986). The Prophet and the Age of the Caliphates: The Islamic Near East from the Sixth to the Eleventh Century. Taylor & Francis.
- Khanbaghi, Aptin (2016). "Champions of the Persian Language: The Mongols or the Turks?". In De Nicola, Bruno; Melville, Charles (eds.). The Mongols' Middle East: Continuity and Transformation in Ilkhanid Iran. Brill. pp. 195–215.
- Levi, Scott Cameron; Sela, Ron, eds. (2010). Islamic Central Asia: an anthology of historical sources. Indiana University Press.
- Lewis, Bernard (1992). The World of Islam. London: Thames and Hudson. ISBN 978-0-500-27624-2.
- Meisami, J. S. (1993). "The Past in Service of the Present: Two Views of History in Medieval Persia". Poetics Today:Cultural Processes in Muslim and Arab Societies: Medieval and Early Modern Periods. 14 (2, (Summer)). Duke University Press.
- Meisami, Julie Scott (1999). Persian historiography to the end of the twelfth century. Edinburgh University Press.
- Notghi, Hamid; Sabri-Tabrizi, Gholam-Reza (1994). "Hail to Heydarbaba: A Comparative View of Popular Turkish & Classical Persian Poetical Languages". British Journal of Middle Eastern Studies. 21 (2). Taylor & Francis, Ltd.: 240–251. doi:10.1080/13530199408705603.
- Poliakova, E. A. (1984). "The Development of a Literary Canon in Medieval Persian Chronicles: The Triumph of Etiquette". Iranian Studies. 17 (2/3 (Spring–Summer)). Taylor & Francis, Ltd.: 237–256. doi:10.1080/00210868408701630.
- Rowson, E.K. (1998). "Ghaznavids". In Meisami, Julie Scott; Starkey, Paul (eds.). Encyclopedia of Arabic Literature. Vol. 1. Routledge.
- Raza, S. Jabir (2014). "Coinage and Metallurgy Under the Ghaznavid Sultan Mahmud". Proceedings of the Indian History Congress. 75: 224–231. ISSN 2249-1937. JSTOR 44158383.
- Roy, Kaushik (2015). Warfare in Pre-British India – 1500BCE to 1740CE. Routledge.
- Roy, Kaushik (2016). Military Manpower, Armies and Warfare in South Asia. Routledge.
- Schwartzberg, Joseph E. (1978). A Historical atlas of South Asia. Chicago: University of Chicago Press. p. 146, map XIV.2 (l). ISBN 0226742210. Archived from the original on 24 February 2021.
- Sharlet, Jocelyn (2011). Patronage and Poetry in the Islamic World: Social Mobility and Status in the Medieval Middle East and Central Asia. Tauris Academic Studies.
- Spooner, Brian; Hanaway, William L. (2012). Literacy in the Persianate World: Writing and the Social Order. University of Pennsylvania Press.
- Spuler, B. (1970). "The Disintegration of the Caliphate in the East". In Holt, P.M.; Lambton, Ann K.S.; Lewis, Bernard (eds.). Cambridge History of Islam. Vol. IA: The Central islamic Lands from Pre-Islamic Times to the First World War. Cambridge University Press.
- Yagnik, Achyut; Sheth, Suchitra (2005), The Shaping of Modern Gujarat: Plurality, Hindutva, and Beyond, Penguin Books India, p. 39, ISBN 978-0-14-400038-8
- Spuler, B. (1991). "Ghaznawids". In Lewis, B.; Pellat, C.; Schacht, J. (eds.). The Encyclopedia of Islam. Vol. II. Brill.
- Taagepera, Rein (1997). "Expansion and Contraction Patterns of Large Polities: Context for Russia". International Studies Quarterly. 41 (3):(September) (3). Wiley: 475–504. doi:10.1111/0020-8833.00053.
- Thapar, Romila (2004). Somanatha: The Many Voices of a History. Penguin Books India. ISBN 1-84467-020-1.
- Turchin, Peter; Adams, Jonathan M.; Hall, Thomas D (2006). "East-West Orientation of Historical Empires". Journal of World-Systems Research. 12 (2):(December). University of Pittsburgh Press. ISSN 1076-156X.
- Wink, Andre (2002). Al-Hind: The Making of the Indo-Islamic World. Vol. 2. Brill.
- Yarshater, E. (1960). "The Theme of Wine-Drinking and the Concept of the Beloved in Early Persian Poetry". Studia Islamica. 13. Brill.
- Yarshater, Ehsan (2008). "Iran". Welcome to Encyclopaedia Iranica. Encyclopaedia Iranica.
- Ziad, Homayra (2006). "Ghaznavids". In Meri, J. (ed.). Medieval Islamic Civilization: An Encyclopedia. Routledge.
- Aggarwal, Neil Krishan (4 July 2017). "Using culture and psychology to counter the Taliban's violent narratives". International Review of Psychiatry. 29 (4). Taylor & Francis: 313–319. doi:10.1080/09540261.2017.1343530. ISSN 0954-0261. PMID 28805126.
