= Homsar, Iran =

Village in Isfahan province, Iran

Homsar Persian: همسار
- Village
- Location within Iran
- Coordinates: 33°15′54″N 52°15′04″E
- Country: Iran
- Province: Isfahan
- County: Ardestan
- District: Mahabad
- Rural District: Hombarat

Population (2016)
  - Total: 44
- Time zone: UTC+3:30 (IRST)

Homsar (Persian: همسار) (Note: Also romanized as Homsār) is a village in Hombarat Rural District of Mahabad District in Ardestan County, Isfahan province, Iran.

== Demographics ==
=== Population ===
At the time of the 2006 National Census, the village's population was 82 in 25 households, when it was in the Central District. The following census in 2011 counted 71 people in 27 households. The 2016 census measured the population of the village as 44 people in 20 households.

In 2019, the rural district was separated from the district in the formation of Mahabad District.
