= Ali of Ghazna =

Ghaznavid sultan from 1048 to 1049

Ali ibn Mas'ud علی ابن مسعود

Sultan of the Ghaznavid Empire
- Reign: 1048–1049
- Predecessor: Mas'ud II
- Successor: Abd al-Rashid of Ghazna
- Died: c. 1050
- Dynasty: Ghaznavid
- Father: Mas'ud I
- Religion: Sunni Islam

Ali ibn Mas'ud (Persian: علی ابن مسعود, romanized: ʿAlī ibn Masʿūd) was the Ghaznavid sultan, ruling from 1048 to 1049. The son of Mas'ud I (r. 1030–1040), Ali succeeded his nephew Mas'ud II (r. 1048). Although Abdur Rashid sent an army led by his vizier to Sistan to arrest Ghaznavi, the vizier changed sides and defeated Ali and replaced him with Abd al-Rashid and he was killed in 1050.

== Bibliography ==
- Bosworth, C.E. (1977). The Later Ghaznavids. Columbia University Press.
- Litvinsky, B. A. (1996). History of civilizations of Central Asia. OCLC 1179534386.
