= LIJ =

LIJ or Lij may refer to:

- Laj, West Azerbaijan (also Līj), an Iranian village in Mokriyan-e Sharqi Rural District
- Ligurian language (ISO 639-3 code: lij), a Gallo-Italic language spoken primarily in the territories of the former Republic of Genoa
- Lij, a title of the Ethiopian aristocracy and court
- Lishui Airport (IATA code LIJ), an airport in China
- Long Island Jewish Medical Center, a clinical and academic hospital within the Northwell Health system
- Los Ingobernables de Japon, a Japanese professional wrestling stable
