= Garmsir Rural District =

Rural district in Isfahan province, Iran

Garmsir Rural District Persian: دهستان گرمسير
- Rural District
- Location within Iran
- Coordinates: 33°38′N 52°17′E
- Country: Iran
- Province: Isfahan
- County: Ardestan
- District: Mahabad
- Established: 1987
- Capital: Mughar

Population (2016)
  - Total: 3,218
- Time zone: UTC+3:30 (IRST)

Garmsir Rural District (Persian: دهستان گرمسير) is in Mahabad District of Ardestan County, Isfahan province, Iran. Its capital is the village of Mughar. The previous capital of the rural district was the village of Mahabad, now a city.

== Demographics ==
=== Population ===
At the time of the 2006 National Census, the rural district's population (as a part of the Central District) was 3,781 in 973 households. There were 3,388 inhabitants in 993 households at the following census of 2011. The 2016 census measured the population of the rural district as 3,218 in 1,061 households. The most populous of its 45 villages was Mughar, with 1,139 people.

In 2019, the rural district was separated from the district in the formation of Mahabad District.

=== Other villages in the rural district ===
- Bolhur
- Dasht-e Azadegan
- Dowlatabad
- Gol Anjireh
- Goruh-e Sarhangcheh
- Hasanabad
- Heydarabad
- Hoseynabad
- Jafarabad
- Khorramabad
- Khoshkabad
- Omidiyeh
- Rahmatabad
- Sahamiyeh
- Sarhangcheh
- Seri Jahan
- Shamsabad
