= Mahabad District =

District in Isfahan province, Iran

Mahabad District Persian: بخش مهاباد
- District
- Location within Iran
- Coordinates: 33°36′N 52°17′E
- Country: Iran
- Province: Isfahan
- County: Ardestan
- Established: 2019
- Capital: Mahabad
- Time zone: UTC+3:30 (IRST)

Mahabad District (Persian: بخش مهاباد) is in Ardestan County, Isfahan province, Iran. Its capital is the city of Mahabad, whose population at the time of the 2016 National Census was 3,727 people in 1,158 households.

== History ==
In 2019, Garmsir and Hombarat Rural Districts, and the city of Mahabad were separated from the Central District in the formation of Mahabad District.

== Demographics ==
=== Administrative divisions ===
Mahabad District
Administrative Divisions
Garmsir RD
Hombarat RD
Mahabad (city)
RD = Rural District
