= Ibn Duraid =

Iraqi lexicographer

- إبن دريد
- Born: Abū Bakr Muḥammad ibn al-Ḥasan al-Azdī ibn Durayd; 837/838 CE; Basra, Abbasid Caliphate (modern-day Iraq)
- Died: August 13, 933 CE; Baghdad, Abbasid Caliphate (modern-day Iraq)
- Occupations: Philologist, Lexicographer, Poet

Academic background
- Influences: Abū Hātim as-Sijistāni, ar-Riāshi, Abd ar-Rahmān Ibn Abd Allah, Abū Othmān Saīd Ibn Hārūn al-Ushnāndāni, al-Tawwazī, al-Ziyādi

Academic work
- Era: Middle Abbasid era
- Notable works: Jamharat al-Lugha, Kitāb al-Ishtiqāq, al-Malāḥin
- Influenced: Abū al-Faraj al-Iṣbahānī

Abū Bakr Muhammad ibn al-Ḥasan ibn Duraid al-Azdī al-Baṣrī ad-Dawsī Al-Zahrani (أبو بكر محمد بن الحسن بن دريد بن عتاهية الأزدي البصري الدوسي الزهراني), or Ibn Duraid (إبن دريد) (c. 837-933 CE), a leading grammarian of Baṣrah, was described as "the most accomplished scholar, ablest philologer and first poet of the age", was from Baṣra in the Abbasid era. Ibn Duraid is best known today as the lexicographer of the influential dictionary, the Jamharat al-Lugha (جمهرة اللغة). The fame of this comprehensive dictionary of the Arabic language is second only to its predecessor, the Kitab al-'Ayn of al-Farahidi.

== Life ==
Ibn Duraid was born in Baṣrah, on "Sālih Street", (233H / c. 837CE) in the reign of the Abbasid caliph Al-Mu'tasim; Among his teachers were Abū Hātim as-Sijistāni, ar-Riāshi (Abū al-Faḍl al-'Abbās ibn al-Faraj al-Riyāshī)), Abd ar-Rahmān Ibn Abd Allah, surnamed nephew of al-Asmāi (Ibn Akhī’l Asmāi), Abū Othmān Saīd Ibn Hārūn al-Ushnāndāni, author of Kitāb al-Maāni, al-Tawwazī, and al-Ziyādi. He quoted from the book Musālamāt al-Ashrāf (Gestures of Friendship of the Nobles) written by his paternal uncle al-Ḥasan ibn Muḥammad. Ibn Duraid himself identified with the Qahtanite Arabs, the larger confederacy of which Azd is a sub-group. Ibn Khallikān in his biographical dictionary gives his full name as:

Abū Bakr M. b. al-Hasan b. Duraid b. Atāhiya b. Hantam b. Hasan b. Hamāmi b. Jarw Wāsī b. Wahb b. Salama b. Hādir b. Asad b. Adi b. Amr b. Mālik b. Fahm b. Ghānim b. Daus b. Udthān b. Abd Allāh b. Zahrān b. Kaab b. al-Hārith b. Kaab b. Abd Allāh b. Mālik b. Nasr b. al-Azd b. al-Gauth b. Nabt b. Mālik b. Zaid b. Kahlān b. Saba b. Yashjub b. Yārub b. Kahtān, of the Azd tribe, native of Baṣrah.

Ibn al-Nadim writing two centuries earlier gives a slightly curtailed genealogy with some variation:

Abū Bakr Muḥammad ibn al-Ḥasan ibn Durayd bin 'Atāhiyah ibn Ḥantam ibn Ḥasan, son of Ḥamāmī, whose name came from a village in the region of 'Umān called Ḥamāmā and who was the son of Jarw ibn Wāsi' ibn Wahb bin Salamah ibn Jusham ibn Ḥādir ibn Asad bin 'Adī ibn 'Amr ibn Mālik ibn Naṣr ibn Azd ibn al-Ghawth.

When Basra was attacked by the Zanj and Ar-Riāshī murdered in 871 he fled to Oman, then ruled by Muhallabi. He is said to have practiced as a physician although no works on medical science by him are known to survive. After twelve years Khallikan says he returned to Basra for a time and then moved to Persia In Al-Nadim's account he moved to Jazīrat Ibn 'Umārah (this may refer to the Baṣra suburb) before he moved to Persia where he was under the protection of the governor Abd-Allah Mikali and his sons, and where he wrote his chief works. Abd-Allah appointed him director of the government office for Fars province and it is said while there each time his salary was paid he donated almost it all to the poor. In 920 he moved to Baghdad, and received a monthly pension of fifty dinars from the caliph Al-Muqtadir in support of his literary activities which continued to his death. In Baghdad he became an acquaintance of Muhammad ibn Jarir al-Tabari.

=== Illness and death ===
Ibn Khallikan reports many tales of Ibn Duraid's fondness of wine and alcohol so when towards the age of ninety Ibn Duraid suffered partial paralysis following a stroke, he managed to cure himself by drinking theriac , he resumed his old habits and continued to teach. However the palsy returned the next year much more severe so he could only move his hands. He would cry out in pain when anyone entered his room. His student Abū Alī Isma’il al-Kāli al-Baghdādi remarked: The Almighty has punished him for saying in his Maksūraī:

"Oh Time! You have met someone who, were the heavenly spheres to fall upon him, would not utter complaint".

He remained paralysed and in pain for two more years, although his mind remained sharp and he answered, as quick as thought, questions from students on points of philology. To one such, Abū Hātim, he responded:

Had the light of my eyes been extinguished, you would not have found one as able to quench your thirst for knowledge".

His last words were in reply to Abū Alī:

"Hāl al-jarīd dūn al-karīd" (the choking stops the verse).

(These were the proverbial words of the jahiliyya poet ʿAbīd ibn al-Abraṣ uttered on the point of being put to death on the orders of the last king of Hīra, an-Nomān Ibn al-Mundir al-Lakhmi, and commanded to first recite some of his verse.)

Ibn Duraid died in August of 933, on a Wednesday, He was buried on the east bank of the Tigris River in the Abbasiya cemetery, and his tomb was next to the old arms bazaar near the As-Shārī 'l Aazam. The celebrated muʿtazilite philosopher cleric Hāshim Abd as-Salām al-Jubbāi died the same day. Some of Baghdad cried "Philology and theology have died on this day!"

== Works ==
He is said to have written over fifty books of language and literature. As a poet his versatility and range was proverbial and his output too prodigious to count. His collection of forty stories were much cited and quoted by later authors, though only fragments survive. Perhaps drawing on his Omani ancestry, his poetry contains some distinctly Omani themes.

=== Kitāb al-Maqṣūrah ===
- Maqṣūrah (مقصورة) i.e. "Compartment", or "Short Alif" (maqsūr); also known as Kasīda; is a eulogium to al-Shāh 'Abd-Allāh Ibn Muḥammad Ibn Mīkāl and his son Abu'l-Abbas Ismail; editions by A. Haitsma (1773), E. Scheidius (1786), and N. Boyesen (1828). Various commentaries on the poem exist in manuscript (cf. C. Brockelmann, Gesch. der Arab. lit., i. 211 ff., Weimar 1898).

=== Kitāb al-Ishtiqāq ===
- Al-Ištiqāq Kitāb Dida aš-šu‘ūbīya wa fī Yufasir Ištiqāq al-'Asmā' al-'Arabīati (الاشتقاق كتاب ضد الشعوبية وفيه يفسر اشتقاق الأسماء العربية) (Book of Etymology Against Shu'ubiyya and Arabic Name Etymologies Explained); abbr., Kitāb ul-Ištiqāq (الاشتقاق) (ed., Wüstenfeld, Göttingen, 1854): Descriptions of etymological ties of Arabian tribal names and the earliest polemic against the "šu‘ūbīya" populist movement.

=== Jamhara fi 'l-Lughat ===
- Jamhara fi 'l-Lughat (جمهرة اللغة) (The Main Part, The Collection) on the science of language, or Arabic language dictionary, Owing to the fragmented process of the text's dictation, the early parts made in Persia and later parts from memory in Baghdad, with frequent additions and deletions evolved from a diversity of transcriptions, additions and deletion, led to inconsistencies. The grammarian Abū al-Fatḥ 'Ubayd Allāh ibn Aḥmad collected several of the various manuscripts and produced a corrected copy which ibn Duraid read and approved. Originally in three manuscript volumes, the third largely comprised an extensive index. Published in Hyderabad, India in four volumes (1926, 1930). The historian Al-Masudi praised Ibn Duraid as the intellectual heir of Al-Khalil ibn Ahmad al-Farahidi, the compiler of the first Arabic dictionary, the Kitab al-'Ayn (كتاب العين), i.e. "The Source Book". in his Kitāb al-Fihrist Al-Nadīm reports a written account by Abū al-Fatḥ ibn al-Naḥwī that Ibn Duraid examined the manuscript of Kitāb al-'Ayn at Baṣrah in 248H/ 862CE. Al-Nadim also names ibn Duraid among a group of scholar proofreaders who corrected the Kitāb al-'Ayn. However while Ibn Duraid's dictionary builds on al-Farahidi's – indeed Niftawayh, a contemporary of Ibn Duraid's, even accused him of plagiarizing from al-Farahidi – Ibn Duraid departs from the system which had been followed previously, of a phonetic progression of letter production that began with the 'deepest' letter, the glottal pharyngeal letter "ع" (عين), i.e. ʿayn meaning "source". Instead he adopted the abjad, or Arabic alphabetic ordering system that is the universal standard of dictionary format today.

=== Other Titles ===
- al-'Ashrabat (Beverages) (الأشربة)
- al-'Amali (Dictation) (الأمالي) (educational translation exercises)
- as-Siraj wa'l-lijam (Saddle and Bridle) (السرج واللجام)
- Kitab al-Khayl al-Kabir (Great Horse Book) (كتاب الخيل الكبير)
- Kitab al-Khayl as-Saghir (Little Horse Book) (كتاب الخيل الصغير)
- Kitab as-Silah (Book of Weapons) (كتاب السلاح)
- Kitab al-Anwa (The Tempest Book) (كتاب الأنواء); astrological influence on weather
- Kitab al-Mulaḥḥin (The Composer Book) (كتاب الملاحن)
- al-Maqsur wa'l-Mamdud (Limited and Extended)(المقصور والممدود)
- Dhakhayir al-Hikma (Wisdom Ammunition) (ذخائر الحكمة)
- al-Mujtanaa (The Select) (المجتنى) (Arabic)
- as-Sahab wa'l-Ghith (Clouds and Rain) (السحاب والغيث)
- Taqwim al-Lisan (Eloqution) (تقويم اللسان)
- Adaba al-Katib (Literary Writer) (أدب الكاتب)
- al-Wishah (The Ornamental Belt) (الوشاح) didactic treatise
- Zuwwar al-Arab (Arab Pilgrims) (زوار العرب)
- al-Lughat (Languages) (اللغات); dialects and idiomatic expressions.
- Fa'altu wa-Af'altu (Verb and Active Participle) (فَعَلْتُ وأَفْعَلْتُ)
- al-Mufradat fi Gharib al-Qurān (Rare Terms in the Qurān) (المفردات في غريب القرآن)

== Commentaries on his work ==
- Abū Bakr Ibn al-Sarrāj; Commentary on the Maqṣūrah called Kitāb al-Maqṣūr wa-al-Mamdūd (The Shortened and the Lengthened)
- Abū Sa’īd al-Sirāfī, (a judge of Persian origin); Commentary on the Maqṣūrah
- Abu 'Umar al-Zahid; Falsity of "Al-Jamharah" and a Refutation of Ibn Duraid
- Al-'Umari (a judge of Tikrīt); Commentary on the "Maqṣūrah" of Abū Bakr Ibn Durayd

== See also ==
- List of Arab scientists and scholars
