= Shah ibn Mikal =

- Allegiance: Abbasid Caliphate
- Service years: c. 863 – 880
- Rank: Military commander
- Conflicts: Fifth Fitna, 870 Alid revolt of Ali ibn Zayd al-Talibi
- Children: Muhammad

Shah ibn Mikal or al-Shah ibn Mikal, was an Iranian nobleman from the Mikalid family, who served as a military commander of the Abdallah ibn Tahir, the governor of Khorasan and later directly served under Abbasid caliphs.

== Career ==
He was the son of Mikal, a nobleman who had left Iraq and settled in Khurasan, and could trace his descent back to the Sogdian ruler Divashtich. Shah also had a brother named Muhammad ibn Mikal, who, during his early career, along with Shah, played an important role under the Tahirid governor Abdallah ibn Tahir al-Khurasani. In 864/865, Muhammad was killed during a battle at Ray. During the Caliphal Civil War of 865–866 between the two Abbasids al-Musta'in and al-Mu'tazz, Shah, along with the majority of the Iranians and Arabs sided with al-Musta'in, while the majority of the Turkic military officers sided with al-Mu'tazz. On March 20 865, Shah, along with the two other military officers Bundar al-Tabari and Khalid ibn 'Imran, fought the Turks near Baghdad, but were defeated and forced to withdraw. In the end, the civil war resulted in a victory for al-Mu'tazz. Shah, along with many other supporters of al-Musta'in, however, managed to successfully change their allegiance to al-Mu'tazz.

In 870, Shah was sent under an army to suppress the revolt of the Alid Ali ibn Zayd al-Talibi, which he managed to accomplish. During the Zanj Rebellion, Shah was in 880 appointed as one of the commanders of the cavalry. Nothing more is known about Shah; he later died in the late 9th-century.

== Family ==
Shah had a son named Muhammad ibn Shah, who was in 892 appointed by the Abbasid caliph Al-Mu'tadid as the commander of his guards. Shah also had a nephew named Abd-Allah Mikali, who was the son of his brother Muhammad.

== Sources ==
- Kennedy, Hugh (2001). The Armies of the Caliphs: Military and Society in the Early Islamic State. New York: Routledge. ISBN 0-415-25093-5.
- Al-Tabari, Abu Ja'far Muhammad ibn Jarir (1985–2007). Ehsan Yar-Shater (ed.). The History of Al-Ṭabarī. Vol. 40 vols. Albany, NY: State University of New York Press.
- Bulliet, R. W. (1984). "ĀL-E MĪKĀL". Encyclopaedia Iranica, Vol. I, Fasc. 7. p. 764. Archived from the original on 2014-03-19.
- C.E., Bosworth (2012). "Mīkālīs". Encyclopaedia of Islam, 2nd Ed. Leiden and New York: BRILL. ISBN 9789004161214.
