= Mikalids =

Medieval aristocratic family

The Mikalid family (Persian: آل میکال, romanized: Āl-e Mīkāl), also known as the Mikalis, was a prominent Iranian aristocratic family of Khorasan from the 9th century to the 11th century. They were descended from the pre-Islamic nobility of Samarkand.

== History ==
Map of Khorasan, Transoxiana and Tokharistan

The family were descendants of the Sasanian king Bahram V Gur (420–438). A descendant of Bahram V bore the title of sur and ruled Sogdia probably during the sixth century. There were five members of the family bearing the title of sur, the fifth of the family was a certain Divashtich, who according to Sogdian and Arabic documents found in 1933, bore the titles of "Sogdian king", "ruler of Samarkand" and "ruler of Panjikant". In 722, Divashtich was defeated and killed by the Arabs in Zarafshan, and his son Tarkhun was taken as a prisoner of war to Iraq, where his family lived for three generations.

In the fourth generation, a member of the family named Mikal ibn Abd al-Wahid, settled in Khorasan at the beginning of the ninth century, where his descendants continued to live, using the family name Mikal, which is derived from the latter.

Mikal ibn Abd al-Wahid's sons, Muhammad ibn Mikal and Shah ibn Mikal, served as military commanders for the Tahirids in Baghdad, Ray and Nishapur, where Muhammad resided in, and had a son, named Abd-Allah Mikali. The latter served under the Saffarid Amr ibn al-Layth in Sistan, and then under his rebellious general Sebük-eri and finally as governor of Ahvaz under the caliph Al-Muqtadir (908–932). His son Abu'l-Abbas Ismail served as head of the chancery of the Samanids and as rais of Nishapur. He died in 973. He had three sons; one named Abu Muhammad Abd-Allah, who would obtain the offices of his father, another one named Abu Ja'far Mikali, and the last one named Abu'l-Qasim Ali, a military officer who fought with the Byzantines and the pagan Turks in their steppes. After the fall of the Samanids, the Mikalids began serving the Ghaznavids, who were the new masters of Khorasan. A certain Mikalid nobleman named Hasanak Mikali, rose to high offices, and by 1024 became the vizier of the Ghaznavid ruler Mahmud of Ghazni.

Mahmud later died in 1030, and a civil war shortly ensured between his two sons, the youngest one being Muhammad, and the oldest one being Mas'ud I. Hasanak, along with a Turkic magnate named Ali ibn Il-Arslan, supported Muhammad, and both expected that they would hold absolute power over the Ghaznavid state, while Muhammad would stay as a figurehead. However, Ali, including other Ghaznavid statesman, began to become more distant from Hasanak, and changed their adherence to Mas'ud I.

Hasanak, however, continued to support Mohammad, but in the end was defeated and imprisoned by the latter. Through the efforts of Hasanak's opponent Abu Sahl Zawzani, Mas'ud then had charged Hasanak of infidelity, and had him executed on 14 February 1032. Another Mikalid named Sahib Husain Mikali, served as an administration and military officer under the Ghaznavids, but was captured by the Seljuq Turks during a battle. However, he later became the vizier of the Seljuq ruler Tughril.

There were also outstanding scholars, poets, and arts benefactors from the Mikalid family. The family continued to be mentioned at the end of the 11th century, and thereafter disappears from sources.

== List of Mikalids ==
- Mikal ibn Abd al-Wahid
- Muhammad ibn Mikal, Tahirid general
- Shah ibn Mikal, Tahirid general
- Muhammad ibn Shah, Abbasid general
- Abd-Allah Mikali, Saffarid commander and governor of the Abbasid province of Ahvaz
- Abu'l-Abbas Ismail, Samanid official and rais
- Abu'l-Qasim Ali, Abbasid and Samanid military officer
- Abu Muhammad Abd-Allah, Samanid official and rais
- Abu Ja'far Mikali, Samanid official and rais
- Hasanak Mikali, vizier of Mahmud of Ghazni and rais of Nishapur
- Khwaja Ali Abu'l-Qasim ibn Abdallah, rais of Ghazni in the first half of the 11th century
- Abu'l-Muzaffar Ali ibn Abu'l-Qasim, son of Khwaja, and rais of Ghazni. He died in 1055
- Sahib Husain Mikali, Ghaznavid officer and later Seljuq officer (getting briefly second vizier of Tughril)

== See also ==
- Samanids
- Ghaznavids
- Bu Halim Shaybani family

== Sources ==
- Bosworth, C. E. (1968). "The Political and Dynastic History of the Iranian World (A.D. 1000–1217)". In Frye, R. N. (ed.). The Cambridge History of Iran, Volume 5: The Saljuq and Mongol periods. Cambridge: Cambridge University Press. pp. 1–202. ISBN 0-521-06936-X.
- Bosworth, C. Edmund (1985). "ʿALĪ B. IL-ARSLAN QARĪB". Encyclopaedia Iranica, Vol. I, Fasc. 8. London: C. Edmund Bosworth.
- Bulliet, R. W. (1984). "ĀL-E MĪKĀL". Encyclopaedia Iranica, Vol. I, Fasc. 7.
- Hansen, Valerie (2012). The Silk Road. Oxford University Press. pp. 1–304. ISBN 9780195159318. "Diwashini."
- Jalilov, A. H. (1996). "The Arab Conquest of Transoxania". In Litvinsky, Boris Anatolevich; Dani, Ahmad Hasan; Samghabadi, R. Shabani (eds.). History of Civilizations of Central Asia: The crossroads of civilizations, A.D. 250 to 750. UNESCO. ISBN 9789231032110.
- Marshak, Boris (2002). "PANJIKANT". Encyclopedia Iranica, Online Edition.
- Marshak, Boris (1994). "DĒWĀŠTĪČ". Encyclopaedia Iranica, Vol. II, Fasc. 3. pp. 334–335.
- Nashat, Guity; Beck, Lois (2003). Women in Iran from the Rise of Islam to 1800. University of Illinois Press. pp. 1–253. ISBN 978-0-252-07121-8.
