= Imad al-Dawla Muhammad ibn Ali =

Ghaznavid commander

Imad al-Dawla Muhammad ibn Ali (Persian: عماد الدوله محمد بن علی), was a military officer from the Bu Halim Shaybani family, who served as the commander-in-chief in India under the Ghaznavids.

== Biography ==
Imad al-Dawla Muhammad belonged to the Bu Halim Shaybani family; he was the son of a certain Ali, and had a brother named Rabi ibn Ali. The last mentioned member of the Bu Halim before Imad al-Dawla Muhammad was Najm al-Din Zarir, who was the son of Bu Halim, the eponymous founder of the family. Imad al-Dawla Muhammad and his brother are first mentioned during the reign of Sultan Arslan-Shah, where Imad al-Dawla Muhammad is mentioned as the commander-in-chief (sipahsalar) of the Ghaznavid army in India, and his brother Rabi ibn Ali is also mentioned, but his office is unknown.

However, Arslan-Shah's reign turned out short; his mother, a Seljuq princess named Gawhar Khatun was treated badly, which resulted in her brother Ahmad Sanjar to invade Arslan-Shah's domains, where he managed to decisively defeat Arslan-Shah and make the latter's brother Bahram-Shah the new ruler of the Ghaznavid dynasty, while at the same time acknowledging Sejluq suzerainty. However, Arslan-Shah managed to survive the invasion, and fled to India, where he was supported by the Bu Halim brothers and other officers.

After Ahmad Sanjar left the Ghaznavid capital of Ghazni, Arslan-Shah returned to the capital, where he defeated Bahram-Shah, but Ahmad Sanjar shortly returned and defeated Arslan-Shah, who once again fled, but was captured by a Seljuq commander, and was executed. However, the two Bu Halim brothers kept opposing Bahram-Shah; Imad al-Din Muhammad, who was still in India, managed to withstand an attack by Bahram-Shah, but in the end was defeated and captured at Lahore in 1119 by the latter.

However, because of Imad al-Din Muhammad's great service in India to the Ghaznavids, Bahram-Shah pardoned him and restored him as the commander-in-chief of the Ghaznavid army in India. However, Imad al-Din Muhammad, along with several of his sons such as Mu'tasim ibn Muhammad, shortly rebelled against Bahram-Shah, but he along with his sons were killed by an army sent by Bahram-Shah. After this event, mention of the Bu Halim family completely disappears.

== Sources ==
- Bosworth, C. Edmund (1989). "BŪ ḤALĪM ŠAYBĀNĪ FAMILY". Encyclopaedia Iranica, Vol. IV, Fasc. 5. London et al.: C. Edmund Bosworth. p. 489.
