= Bu Halim Shaybani family =

The Bu Halim Shaybani family (Persian: بو حلیم شیبانی), also simply known as the Bu Halim family (بو حلیم), was a family of governors and military commanders from Khorasan, which served the Ghaznavid Empire during the 11th and 12th-century.

== History ==
The family was native to Jajarm in north-western Khorasan, but under its eponymous founder Bu Halim, the family migrated further west to eastern Khorasan, then ruled by the Ghaznavid Sultan Ibrahim (r. 1059-1099).

Bu Halim's son, Najm al-Din Zarir, well known, was a commander under Ibrahim's son and successor Mas'ud III (r. 1099-1115) and is known to have made raids into India; he invaded Malwa and then further penetrated to Kalinjar and then as far to the Ganges. After this, Najm al-Din Zarir is no longer mentioned in any sources, and mention of the family first re-appears during the reign of Arslan-Shah, where two Bu Halim notables are mentioned; Imad al-Dawla Muhammad ibn Ali, the commander-in-chief (sipahsalar) of the Ghaznavid army in India, and his brother Rabi ibn Ali, whose office is unknown.

However, Arslan-Shah's reign was short. His mother, a Seljuq princess named Gawhar Khatun, was treated badly, which resulted in her brother Ahmad Sanjar invading Arslan-Shah's domains, where he decisively defeated Arslan-Shah and made the latter's brother Bahram-Shah the new ruler of the Ghaznavid dynasty, while at the same time acknowledging Sejluq suzerainty. However, Arslan-Shah managed to survive the invasion, and fled to Kurram District in present day Pakistan, where he was supported by the Bu Halim brothers and other officers.

After Ahmad Sanjar left the Ghaznavid capital of Ghazni, Arslan-Shah returned to the capital, where he defeated Bahram-Shah, but Ahmad Sanjar shortly returned and defeated Arslan-Shah, who once again fled, but was captured by a Seljuq commander, and was executed. However, the two Bu Halim brothers kept opposing Bahram-Shah. Imad al-Din Muhammad, who was still in India, managed to withstand an attack by Bahram-Shah, but in the end was defeated and captured at Lahore in 1119 by the latter.

Because of Imad al-Din Muhammad's great service in India to the Ghaznavids, Bahram-Shah pardoned him and restored him as the commander-in-chief of the Ghaznavid army in India. However, Imad al-Din Muhammad, along with several of his sons such as Mu'tasim ibn Muhammad, shortly rebelled against Bahram-Shah, but he and his sons were killed by an army sent by Bahram-Shah. After this event, mention of the Bu Halim family completely disappears.

== See also ==
- Mikalids
- Ahmad Maymandi

== Sources ==
- Bosworth, C. Edmund (1989). "BŪ ḤALĪM ŠAYBĀNĪ FAMILY". Encyclopaedia Iranica, Vol. IV, Fasc. 5. London et al.: C. Edmund Bosworth. p. 489.
