= Sahib Husain Mikali =

Iranian Politician

Sahib Husain Mikali (Persian: صاحب حسین میکالی), was an Iranian statesman from the Mikalid family, who served the Ghaznavids and later the Seljuqs.

== Biography ==
Sahib is first mentioned as in sources as serving as the ra'is of his native city, Nishapur. In 1035, the Ghaznavid ruler Mas'ud I sent an army under Begtoghdi and Sahib Husain against the Seljuqs, who were stationing near Sarakhs. A battle shortly ensured, which resulted in the withdrawal of most of the Ghaznavid troops under Begtoghdi, while Sahib Husain continued to fight the Seljuqs, but was also defeated and was captured by the Seljuq Chaghri Beg. Sahib Husain later served as the vizier of the Seljuq ruler Tughril. His period as a vizier was only short; in 1054/5 he was replaced by al-Kunduri as the vizier of Tughril, and nothing is known about him after.

== Sources ==
- Bosworth, C. E. (1968). "The Political and Dynastic History of the Iranian World (A.D. 1000–1217)". In Frye, R. N. (ed.). The Cambridge History of Iran, Volume 5: The Saljuq and Mongol periods. Cambridge: Cambridge University Press. pp. 45–46. ISBN 0-521-06936-X.
- Bosworth, C. E. (1975). "The early Ghaznavids". In Frye, R. N. (ed.). The Cambridge History of Iran, Volume 4: From the Arab Invasion to the Saljuqs. Cambridge: Cambridge University Press. pp. 162–198. ISBN 0-521-20093-8.
- Bosworth, C. E. (2011). The Ornament of Histories: A History of the Eastern Islamic Lands AD 650-1041: The Persian Text of Abu Sa'id 'Abd Al-Hayy Gardizi. I.B.Tauris. pp. 1–169. ISBN 978-1-84885-353-9.
- Bosworth, C. E. (2012). "Mīkālīs". In P. Bearman (ed.). Encyclopaedia of Islam New Edition Online (EI-2 English). Leiden and New York: BRILL. doi:10.1163/1573-3912_islam_SIM_5190. ISBN 9789004161214.
- Bulliet, R. W. (1984). "ĀL-E MĪKĀL". Encyclopaedia Iranica, Vol. I, Fasc. 7. p. 764. Archived from the original on 19 March 2014.

Unknown	Vizier of the Seljuq Empire ??? – 1054/1055	Succeeded by Al-Kunduri
