= Abu'l-Abbas Ismail =

Samanid official

- Persian: ابوالقاسم عباس اسماعیل

Head of Chancery
- In office 958–973
- Succeeded by: Abu Muhammad Abd-Allah

Personal details
- Born: Khorasan, Samanid Empire (present-day Iran)
- Died: 973 CE
- Children: 3+, including Abu Muhammad, Abu Ja'far, and Abu'l-Qasim
- Parent: Abd-Allah Mikali (father)
- Relatives: Mikalid family

Abu'l-Abbas Ismail (Persian: ابوالقاسم عباس اسماعیل; died 973 CE), was an Iranian statesman from the Mikalid family, who served the Abbasids, and later the Samanids.

== Biography ==
He was the son of Abd-Allah Mikali, a powerful magnate of the Saffarids, and later the governor of Ahvaz under the Abbasids. When Abu'l-Abbas became old enough, he also began serving the Abbasids and later became the patron of his tutor, the poet Ibn Duraid. Abu'l-Abbas later moved to Nishapur, in his homeland Khorasan, then under the control of the Iranian Samanids. In 958, he was appointed as the head of chancery by the vizier of the Samanid ruler Abd al-Malik I, Abu Ja'far 'Utbi. Abu'l-Abbas would keep this office until his death in 973.

He had three sons; one named Abu Muhammad Abd-Allah, who would obtain the offices of his father, another one named Abu Ja'far Mikali, and the last one named Abu'l-Qasim Ali, a military officer who fought with the Byzantines and the pagan Turks in their steppes.

== Sources ==
- Bulliet, R. W. (1984). "ĀL-E MĪKĀL". Encyclopaedia Iranica, Fasc. 7. Vol. 1. p. 764. Archived from the original on 2014-03-19.
- C.E., Bosworth (2012). "Mīkālīs". Mīkālīs. Leiden and New York: BRILL. ISBN 9789004161214.
