= List of military ranks of imperial Iran =

Military ranks in imperial Iran

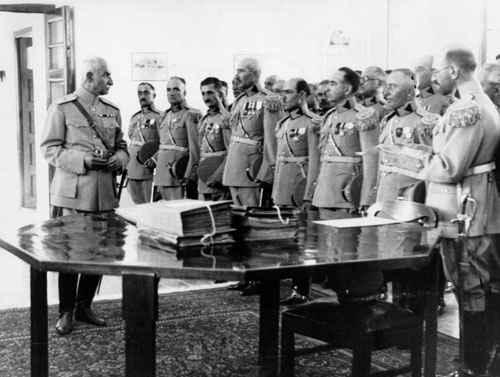
Reza Shah with the commanders of the Imperial Iranian Army, c. 1940.

This list includes all military ranks of Iran from the beginning of the Achaemenid Empire to the end of Pahlavi Iran.

== Military ranks in ancient Iran ==
The Achaemenid Empire army (spāda) was organized on a decimal system, which was highly superior to its Greek rivals and had not been used in any Asian army until the Mongol era.

- Commander-in-Chief of the army: «*spādapati-»: the general with full national authority
- «*baivarapati-»: Commander of a ten-thousand-strong corps of the army.
- «*hazārapati-»: Commander of a thousand-strong regiment.
- «*θatapati-»: Commander of a hundred-strong company.
- «*daθapati-»: Commander of a ten-strong squad.

The ancient Persian army was divided into controllable units under a single commander. These units were based on a Decimal system. For example, in the Achaemenid Empire army, the smallest unit consisted of 10 soldiers, called a Group (daθa "ten"), commanded by a Sergeant (daθapati "daθapati"). Next was a 100-soldier unit called a Company (military unit) (θata "hundred") led by a Captain (armed forces) (θatapati "θatapati"). A 1,000-strong unit was called a Regiment (hazāra) led by a Colonel (hazārapati "hazārapati"), and a 10,000-strong unit was a Division (military) (baivara) led by a major general (baivarapati "baivarapati"). The entire Achaemenid armed forces formed a Corps (spāda-), commanded by a lieutenant general (spādapati "spādapati").

During the Parthian Empire, the armed forces were called spāδ, and the Commander-in-Chief was spāδbad. In the Parthian army, a company was called wast, a regiment was drafš, and a division was gund. Their commanders were wast-sālār, drafš-sālār, and gund-sālār, respectively.

During the Sasanian Empire, the Corps (spāh) was also organized based on the Decimal system, and the commander was referred to as Lieutenant general (spāhbed). A Squad was called "radag" (radag) and a Company was called "tahm" (tahm), with its commander being called [[Lieutenant|tahmdār]] (tahmdār). Five-hundred-strong Battalion (wašt) units were led by a wašt-sālār (wašt-sālār). A 1,000-strong Derafsh (drafš) was led by a drafš-sālār (drafš-sālār), and a 5,000-strong Division called Gond (gund) and was led by a gund-sālār (gund-sālār).

Comparison
Army	Units	Number of troops	Commander
Achaemenid	*daθa-	10	*daθapati-
Achaemenid	*θata-	100	*θatapati-
Achaemenid	*hazāra-	1,000	*hazārapati-
Achaemenid	*baivara-	10,000	*baivarapati-
Achaemenid	*spāda-	60,000	*spādapati- or *kārana-
Parthian	"radag	10	*radagpān
Parthian	wast	10	wast-sālār
Parthian	drafš	1000	drafš-sālār
Parthian	gund	10,000	gund-sālār
Parthian	spāδ	60,000	spāδpat or spāδbad
Sasanian	radag	10	*radagbān
Sasanian	tahm	100	tahmdār
Sasanian	wašt	500	wašt-sālār
Sasanian	drafš	1,000	drafš-sālār
Sasanian	gund	5,000	gund-sālār
Sasanian	spāh	10,000	spāhbed
Sasanian	artēštārān	An army	artēštārān-sālār

== Military ranks in the Safavid, Afsharid, Zand, and early Qajar eras ==
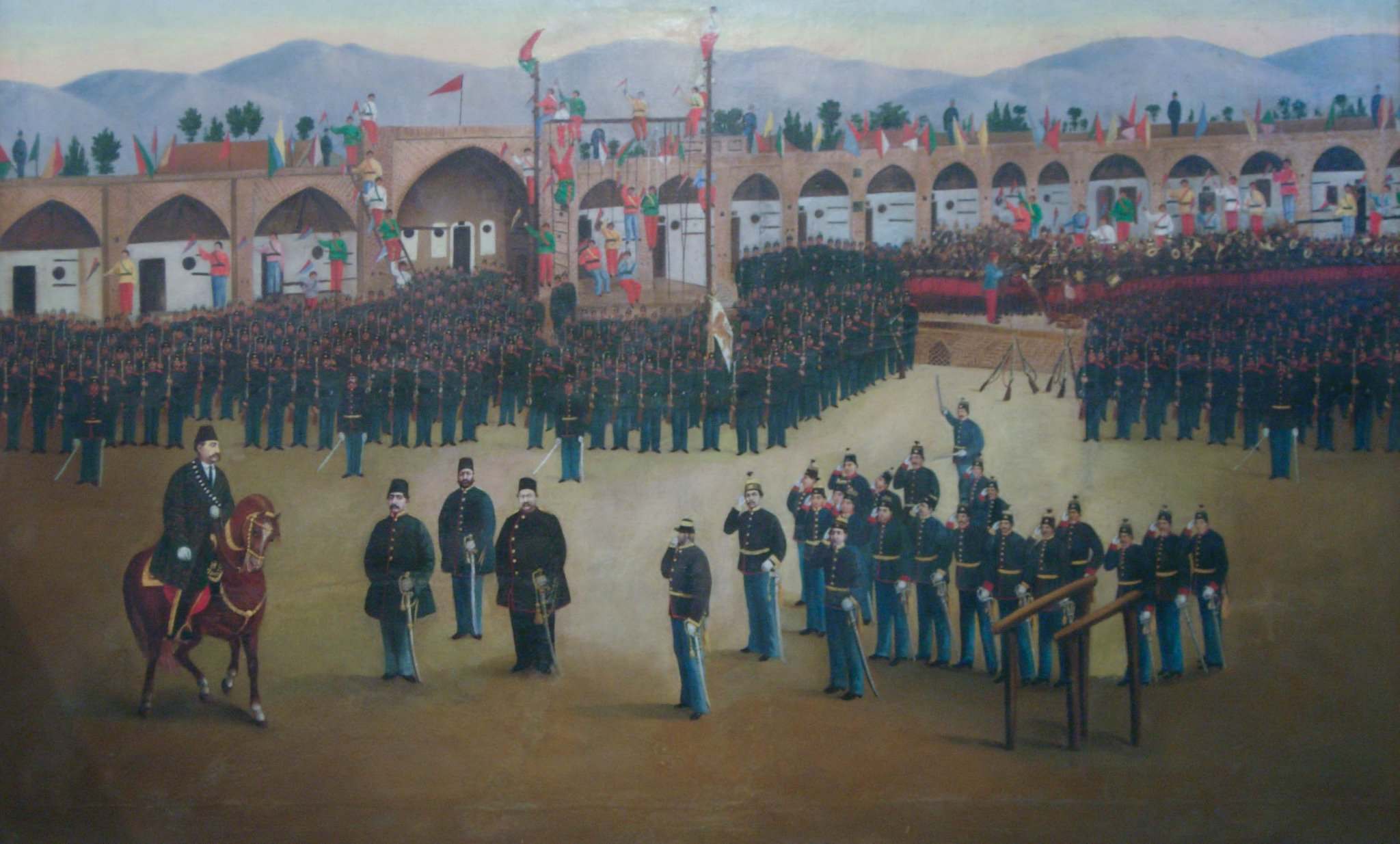
Naser al-Din Shah Qajar's visit to the National Garden, Tehran.

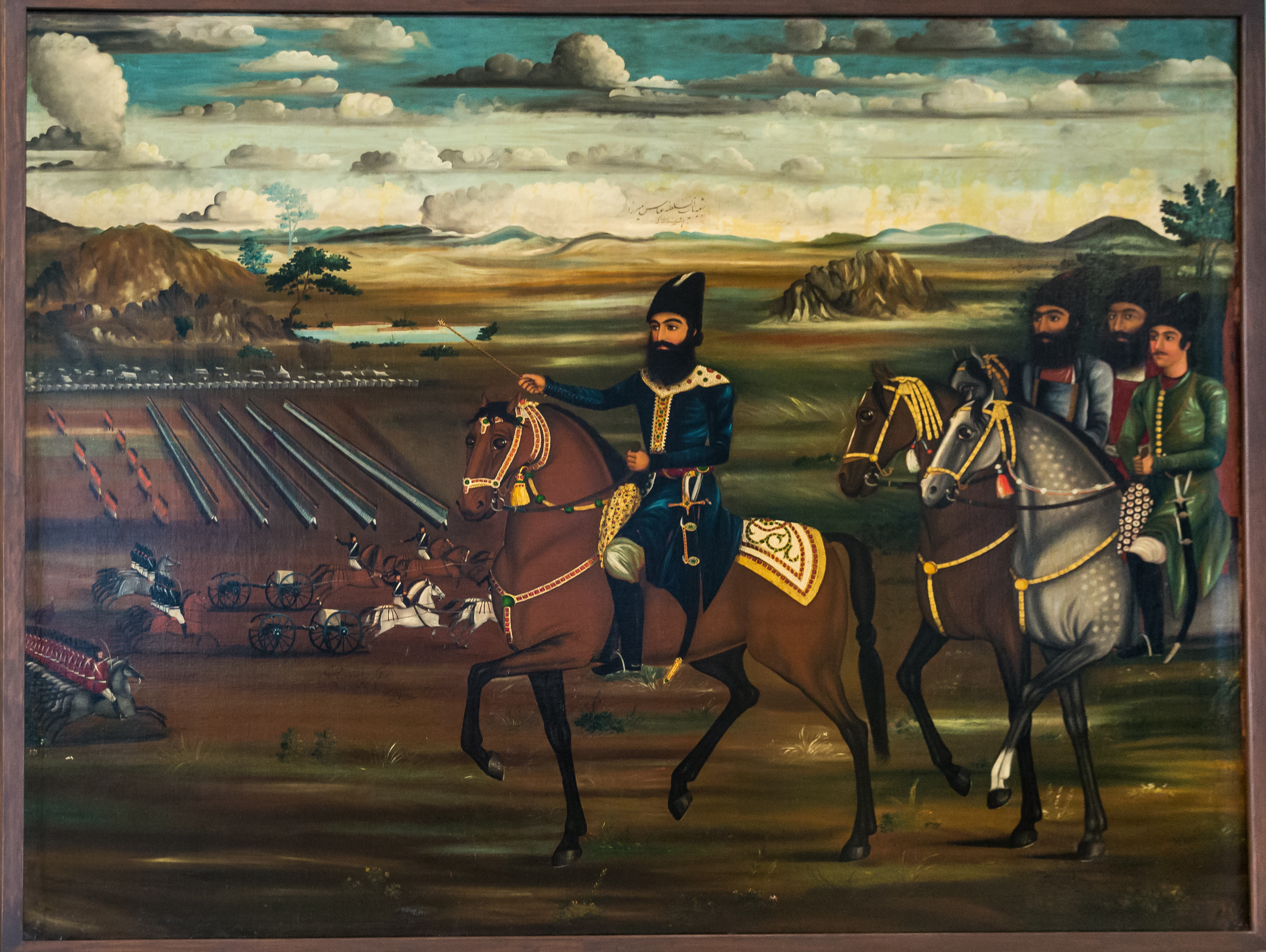
Crown Prince Abbas Mirza's review of the army by Allahverdi Afshar, 1816

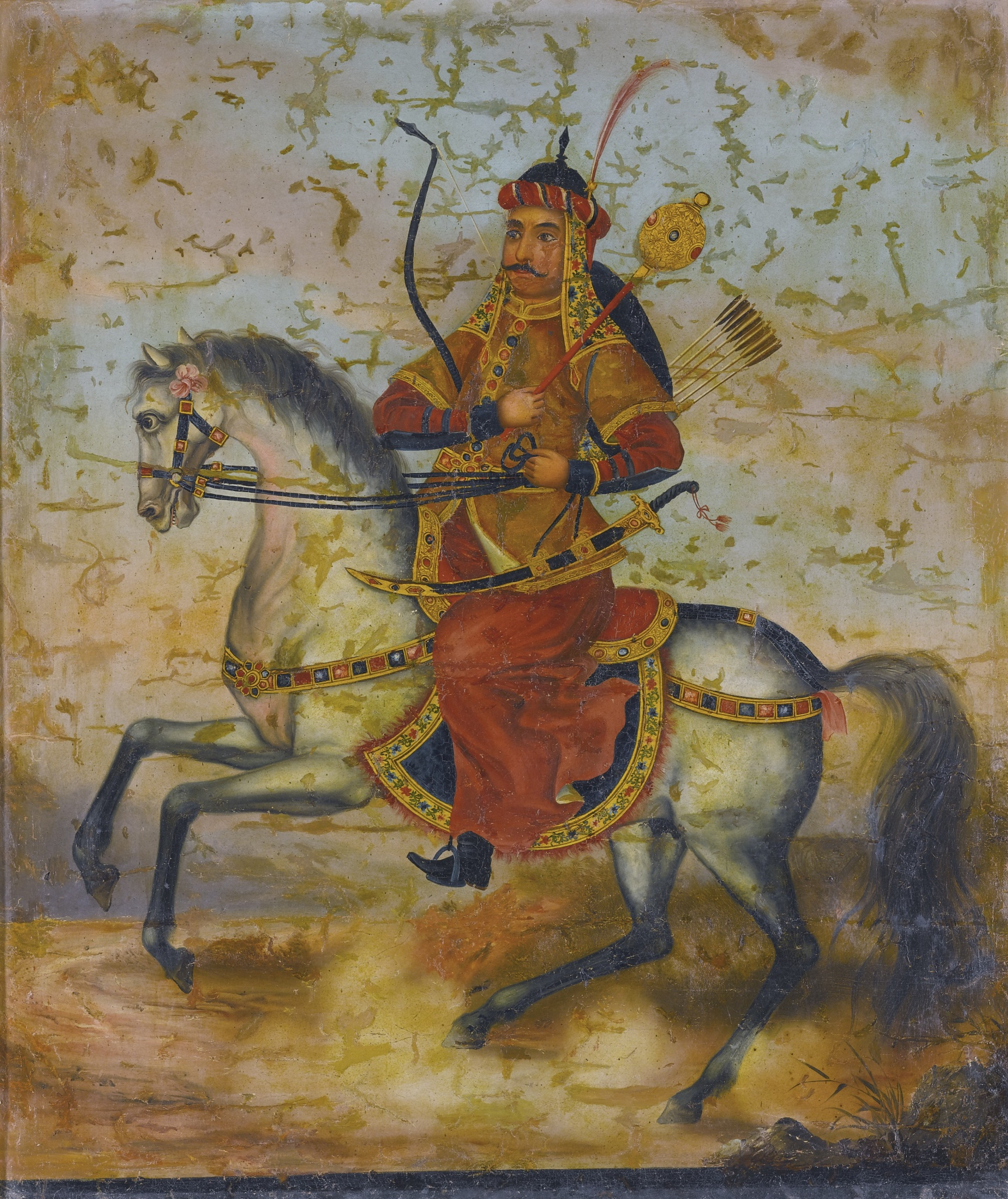
19th century painting of an ancient Iranian armed commander on horseback.

The names of these ranks are primarily derived from the Azerbaijani language, and there was not much change in them until the Qajar era. These ranks were often defined based on the number of subordinates under each commander.

- "Khan": Commander of eight to ten thousand soldiers
- "Sultan": Initially, he was a rank higher than "MeenBaashi" and lower than "Khan", but later he was demoted to the command of one hundred men (YoozBaashi) and was eventually called "SarWaan" (equivalent with the Captain).
- "EekeeominBaashi" or "DovvominBaashi": Commander of two thousand soldiers
- "MeenBaashi": Commander of a thousand soldiers
- "BashYoozBaashi" or "PaansadBaashi": Commander of five hundred soldiers
- "YoozBaashi" (Centurion): Commander of one hundred soldiers
- "AalliBaashi" or "PanjaahBaashi": Commander of fifty soldiers
- "OonBaashi" or "DahBaashi": Commander of ten soldiers

== Military ranks of Iran during the Qajar era ==
Military ranks of Iran during the Pahlavi era were as follows:

Military ranks of Qajar era
Modern title	Qajar era title
ArteshBod	Noyan A'zam
SepahBod	Amir Noyan
SarLashgar	Amir Toman
SarTeep	MeerPanj
SarHang	Sarhang
SarHang II	Nayeb Sarhang
SarGord	Yaavar
SarWaan	Sultan
SotWaan I	Nayeb Avval
SotWaan II	Nayeb Dovvom
Ostowaar I	Moeen Nayeb I
Ostowaar II	Moeen Nayeb II
SarGoroohBaan	Vakil Avval
GoroohBaan I	Vakil Raast
GoroohBaan II	Vakil Chap
SarJookheh	SarJooqeh
Soldier I	Taabeen Avval
Soldier II	Taabeen Dovvom
Soldier	Taabeen

After the reforms initiated by Brigadier General Claude Matthieu, Count Gardane in the Iranian military, transformations in this area also took place. At that time, ranks or degrees of swordsmen were mentioned, each having three levels.

- "Noyan" or "Amir Noyan": This rank was also referred to as commander-in-chief or general. The first-level Noyan was called "Noyan-e A'zam." If considered a rank above "Amir Toman", it would be equivalent to Lieutenant general in modern armies; however, in ancient writings, Noyan was considered the commander of a hundred thousand men, making it equivalent to "ArteshBod" (Colonel general). Although the entire Iranian army on that time, did not have this many soldiers, it rendered the "Amir Noyan" as a ceremonial rank.

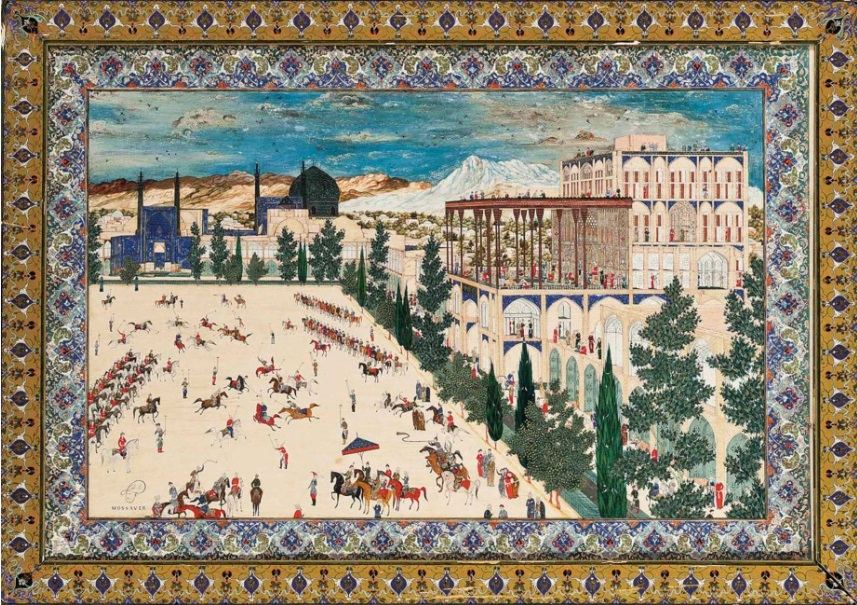
A painting of "Ali Qapu Palace", Isfahan, Iran. A military exercise in presence of the shah of the time.

- "Amir Toman": The term "Toman" in Mongolian language means ten thousand, and the "Amir Toman" was regarded as the commander of ten thousand men.

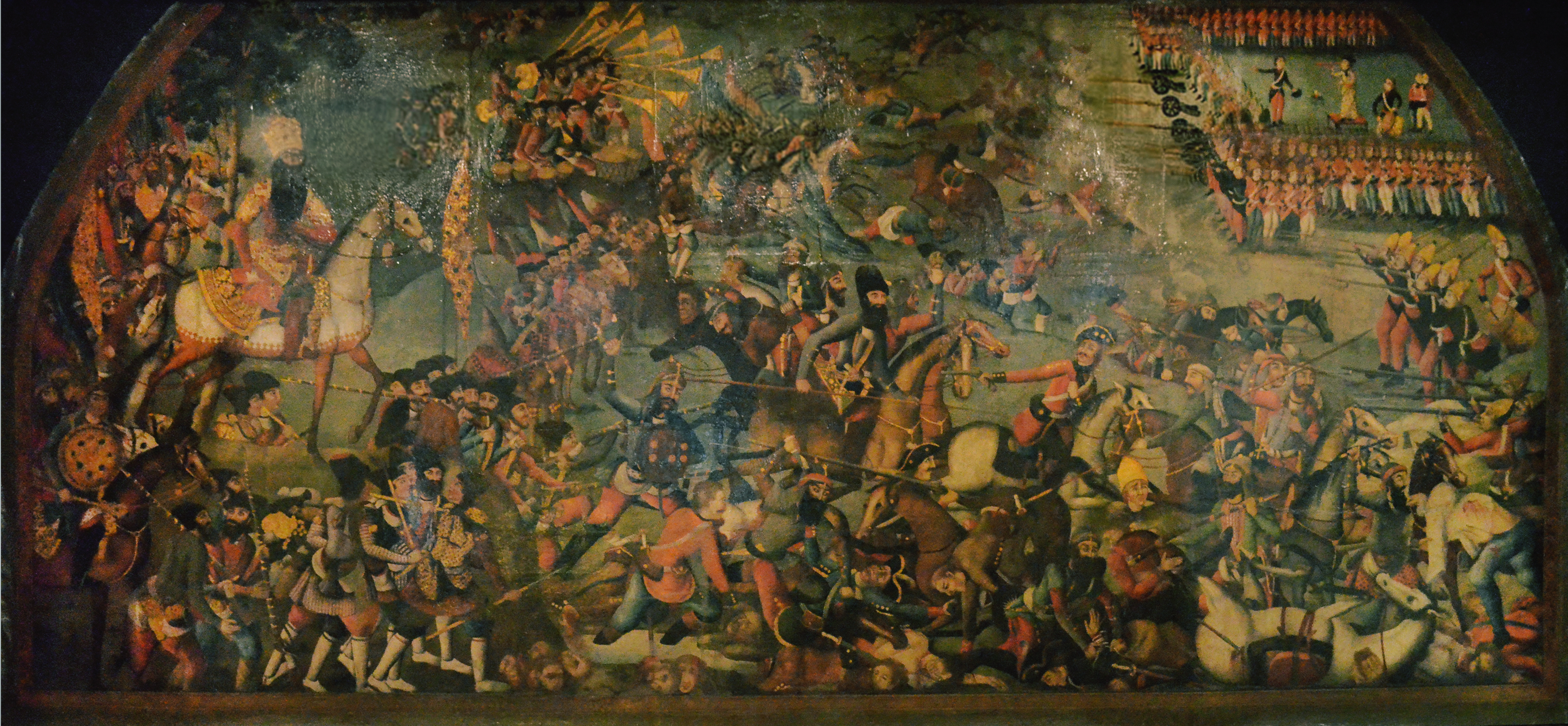
Fath Ali Shah Qajar's victory at Yerevan in the Russo-Persian War (1804–1813) by Mirza Baba

- "SarTeep"
- "SarHang"
- "Yaavar"
- "Sultan"
- "Nayeb"
- "BeigZadeh"

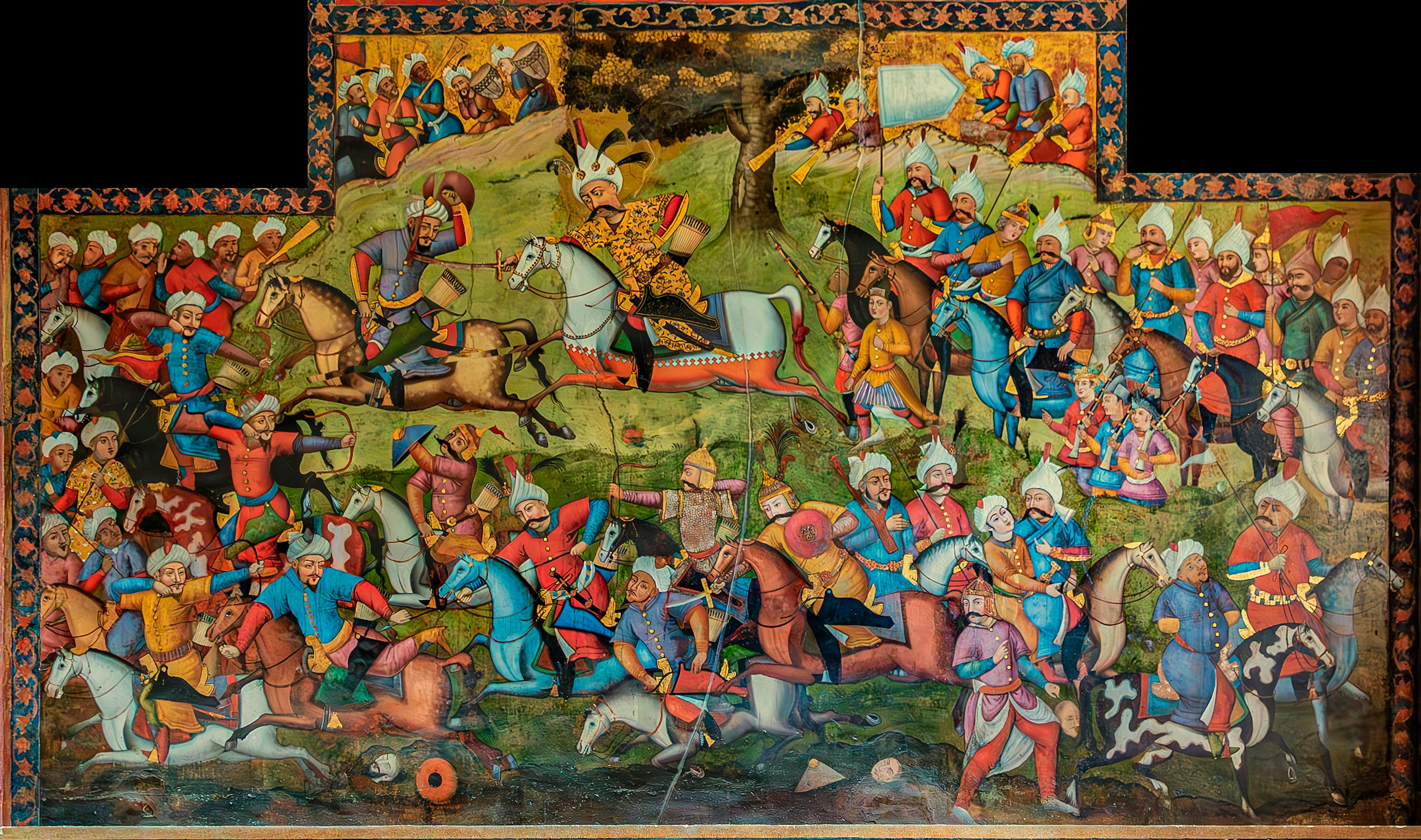
Ismail I defeats Muhammad Shaybani at the Battle of Merv.

Following these, the following ranks are listed that do not include three levels:

- "VakilBaashi"
- "Vakil"
- "SarJooqeh"

Below these ranks is "Taabeen," which has two levels:

- "Taabeen I"
- "Taabeen II"

During the tenure of Mirza Aqa Khan Nuri, a rank called "Amir Panjeh" or "MeerPanj", lower than "Amir Toman" and higher than "SarTeep", was introduced with three levels. Later, it was abolished, and "MeerPanj" became equivalent to "First-class SarTeep".

In the late Qajar era, further modifications were made to the ranks.

Ranks in the "State Gendarmerie of Iran" (called "Amniyeh") were largely taken from French language, e.g., "General," "Colonel," "Major," "Captain," "Lieutenant," "Aspirant," "Gendarme," etc.

== The ranks of the police force ==
The ranks of the police force (called Shahrbani or Nazmiyeh) from 1936 to around 1946, during the Pahlavi era, were as follows:

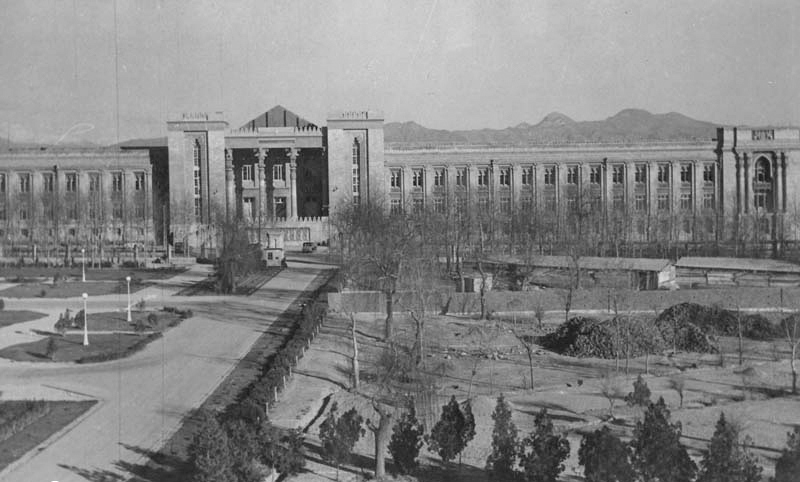
"Tehran Police Force Fortress" (called "Shahrbani" or "Nazmiyeh") in the 1940s.

"Iranian Police Force" symbol during the Pahlavi era.

Police rank	Army equivalent	Old name in Nazmiyeh
SarPaas	SarTeep	SarTeep
PaasYaar I	Sarhang	Sarhang
Sarhang II	Sarhang	Nayeb Sarhang
Yaavar	Sargord	Yaavar
SarBahr	Sarvan	Sultan
RasadBaan I	Sotvan I	Nayeb I
RasadBaan II	Sotvan II	Nayeb II
SarPaasBaan I	GoroohBaan I	VakilBaashi
SarPaasBaan II	GoroohBaan II	Vakil Raast
SarPaasBaan III	GoroohBaan III	Vakil Chap
PaasBaan	Sarbaz	Aazhaan

== See also ==
- Military history of Iran
- Air force history of Iran
- Naval history of Iran
- Persian war elephants
- Military history of Rey, Iran
- Fall of Babylon
- Afsharid navy
- Military of Afsharid Iran
- Nader Shah's Sword
- Tofangchis
- Zamburak
