= Muhammad ibn Mikal =

Tahirid governor

Muhammad ibn Mikal was an Iranian nobleman from the Mikalid family, who served as a military commander of the Tahirid governor. He was the son of Mikal, a nobleman who had left Iraq and settled in Khurasan, and could trace his descent back to the Sogdian ruler Divashtich. Muhammad also had a brother named Shah ibn Mikal, who, during his early career, along with Muhammad, played an important role under the Tahirid ruler Abdallah ibn Tahir al-Khurasani. In 864, the Alid Hasan ibn Zayd conquered Tabaristan from the Tahirids, while another Alid named Muhammad ibn Ja'far ibn al-Hasan expelled the Tahirid governor of Ray, and captured the city. The Tahirid governor Muhammad ibn Tahir shortly sent an army from Khurasan under Muhammad ibn Mikal, who managed to recapture the city and capture Muhammad ibn Ja'far. Hasan, however, quickly made a counter-attack under his Dailamite general Wajin, who managed to rout the army of Muhammad ibn Mikal, and kill the latter.

Muhammad had a son named Abd-Allah Mikali, who achieved prominence under the Saffarids, a dynasty which had conquered Khurasan from the Tahirids.

== Sources ==
- Al-Tabari, Abu Ja'far Muhammad ibn Jarir (1985–2007). Ehsan Yar-Shater (ed.). The History of Al-Ṭabarī. Vol. 40 vols. Albany, NY: State University of New York Press.
- Bulliet, R. W. (1984). "ĀL-E MĪKĀL". Encyclopaedia Iranica, Vol. I, Fasc. 7. p. 764. Archived from the original on 2014-03-19.
- C.E., Bosworth (2012). "Mīkālīs". Leiden and New York: BRILL. ISBN 9789004161214 http://referenceworks.brillonline.com/entries/encyclopaedia-of-islam-2/mikalis-SIM_5190?s.num=1&s.f.s2_parent=s.f.book.encyclopaedia-of-islam-2&s.q=Mikali.
