= Abd-Allah Mikali =

Iranian statesman

- Persian: عبد الله میکالی

Governor of Ahvaz
- In office ?–?

Personal details
- Died: 920 CE
- Children: Abu'l-Abbas Ismail
- Parent: Muhammad ibn Mikal (father)

Abd-Allah Mikali (Persian: عبد الله میکالی; died 920 CE) was an Iranian statesman from the Mikalid family, who served the Saffarids, and later the Abbasids.

== Biography ==
Abd-Allah was the son of Muhammad ibn Mikal, a prominent Mikalid commander who served the Tahirids of Khorasan. Abd-Allah is first mentioned as a high-ranking official of the Saffarid ruler Amr ibn al-Layth. Amr was killed in 901, and was succeeded by his grandson Tahir ibn Muhammad ibn Amr. Tahir, however, was only a figurehead, while the real power was held by his uncle Al-Layth, his ghulam Sebük-eri, and by Abd-Allah himself. Sebük-eri later rebelled against Tahir, and was joined by Abd-Allah. They soon transferred their allegiance to the Abbasid Caliphate, where Abd-Allah was appointed as governor of Ahvaz. Abd-Allah died in 920, leaving a son named Abu'l-Abbas Ismail, who began serving as head of the administration of the Samanids.

== Sources ==
- Bosworth, C.E. (1975). "The Ṭāhirids and Ṣaffārids". In Frye, R.N. (ed.). The Cambridge History of Iran, Volume 4: From the Arab Invasion to the Saljuqs. Cambridge: Cambridge University Press. pp. 90–135. ISBN 0-521-20093-8.
- Bulliet, R. W. (1984). "ĀL-E MĪKĀL". Encyclopaedia Iranica, Vol. I, Fasc. 7. p. 764. Archived from the original on 2014-03-19.
- C.E., Bosworth (2012). Mīkālīs. Leiden and New York: BRILL. ISBN 9789004161214.
