= Karatay Medrese =

Madrasa in Konya, Turkey

Coordinates: 37°52′29″N 32°29′34″E

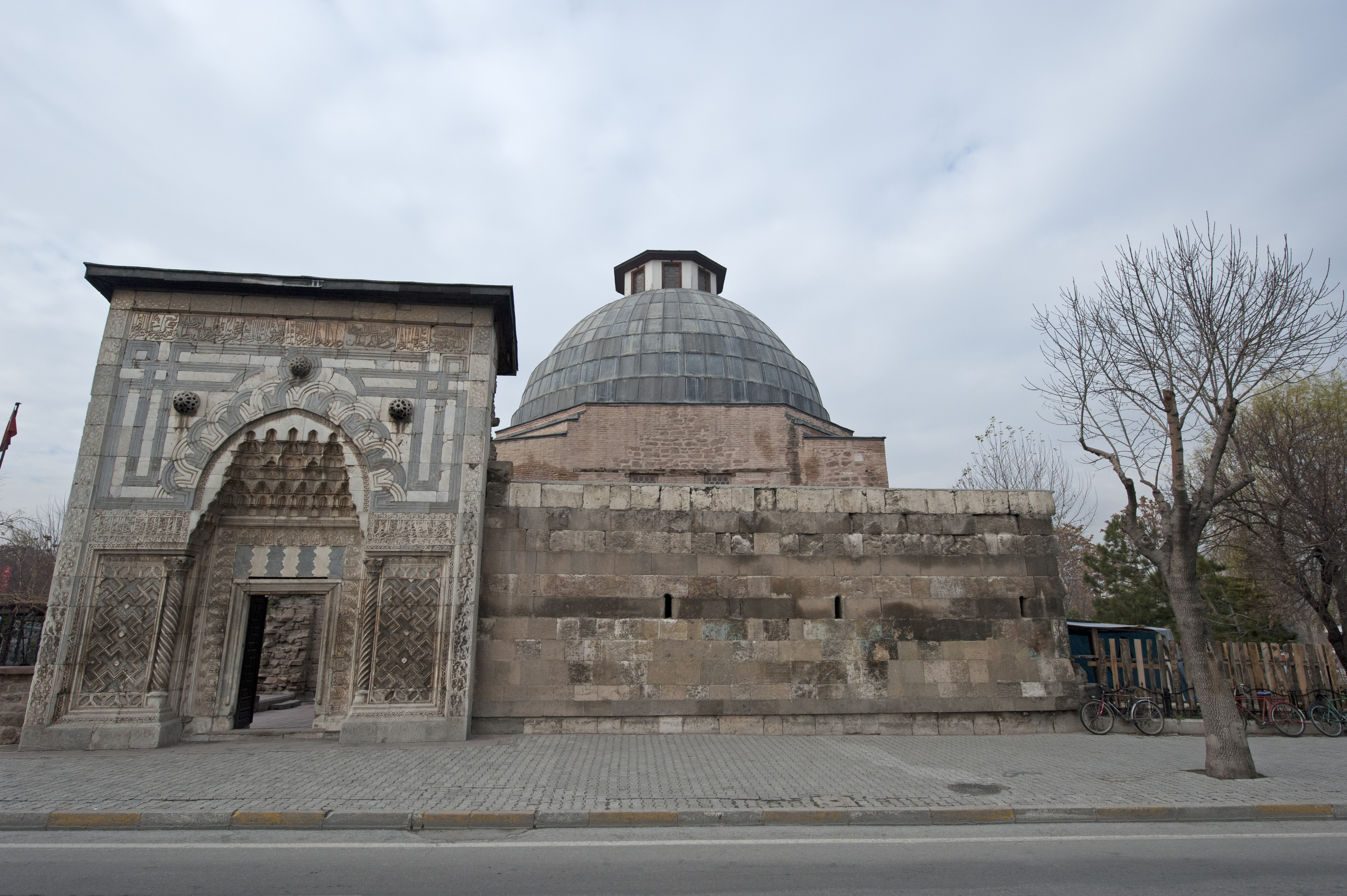

Religion
- Affiliation: Islam
- District: Konya
- Province: Konya
- Region: Central Anatolia

Location
- Location: Konya, Turkey
- Interactive map of Karatay Medrese

Architecture
- Type: Madrasa
- Style: Seljuk
- Completed: 1251
- Minaret: 1

Karatay Medrese (Turkish: Karatay Medresesi) is a madrasa (a school with a frequently but not absolutely religious focus) in Konya, Turkey located at the foot of the citadel hill, across from the ruins of the Seljuk palace and in view of the Alâeddin Mosque. Since 1954, the building has served as a museum displaying a collection of historic tile art, particularly from the Seljuk period. The madrasa and the Karatay Han, a caravanserai completed in the 1240s, are the largest extant monuments in Konya and its immediate regions.

== History ==
It was founded in 1251 by the vizier Jalal al-Din Qaratay (d. 1254) during the joint rule of the brothers Kayqubad II, Kaykaus II, and Kilij Arslan IV. The madrasa was built next to the Küçük Karatay Medrese, which no longer exists. The monument was built after the Mongol invasions of Anatolia and as a result the design is not strictly Seljuk in nature. Jalal al-Din is most likely buried in a side room of the Karatay Medrese, which contains a cenotaph.

In the records of Shams al-Din Ahmad Aflaki, a biographer of Rumi, the madrasa was a place where gatherings of both Sufis and scholars took place. Despite the recorded presence of Sufis, the document listing the madrasa's endowment (waqfiyya) states: "And he [the founder] stipulated that the müderris (teacher of Islamic law in a madrasa) should be Hanafi...", likely because the Seljuk rulers were largely Hanafi.

The tile manufacture of the madrasa was likely coordinated by Muhammad al-Tusi, a master ceramicist from the Iranian city of Tus in Khurasan, who was also responsible for the tile decoration of the Sırçalı Medrese.

== Architecture ==
The madrasa has a rectangular floor plan measuring approximately 31.5 by 26.5 metres (103 by 87 ft). It is entered through a vestibule on the southeast side, at the corner of the building. From the outside, the entrance features a highly ornate stone portal featuring Arabic inscriptions, geometric and floral motifs, ablaq masonry (alternating bands of grey and white marble), and a muqarnas canopy over the doorway. The portal, which is not joined to the body of the building, is similar to that of the Alâeddin Mosque; the stonework is likely the work of craftsmen from northern Syria in the 1220s. It is possible that the portal had been previously built at the same time as the Alâeddin Mosque and was reused for the madrasa.

Exterior

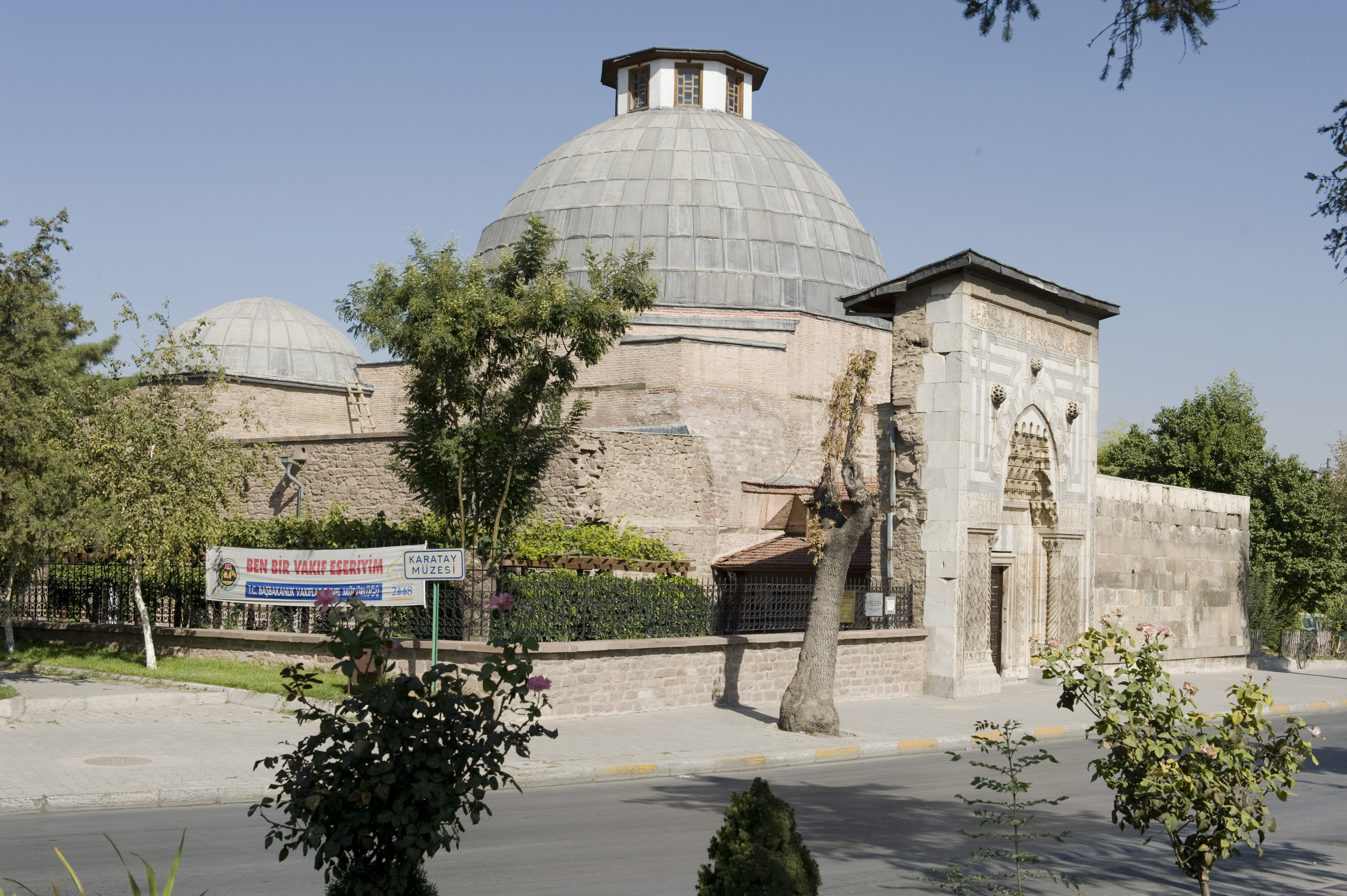
Exterior of the madrasa

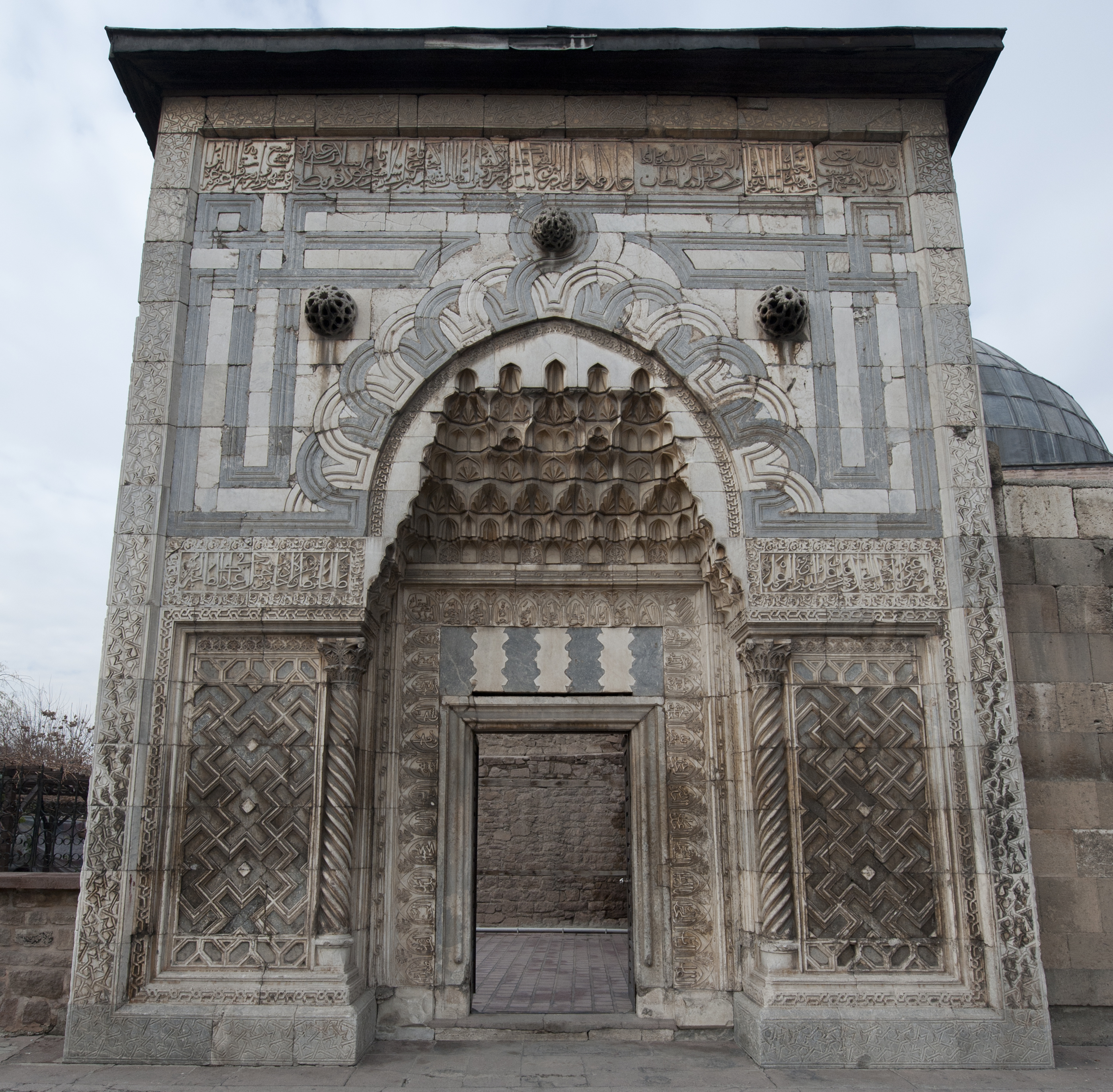
The entrance portal

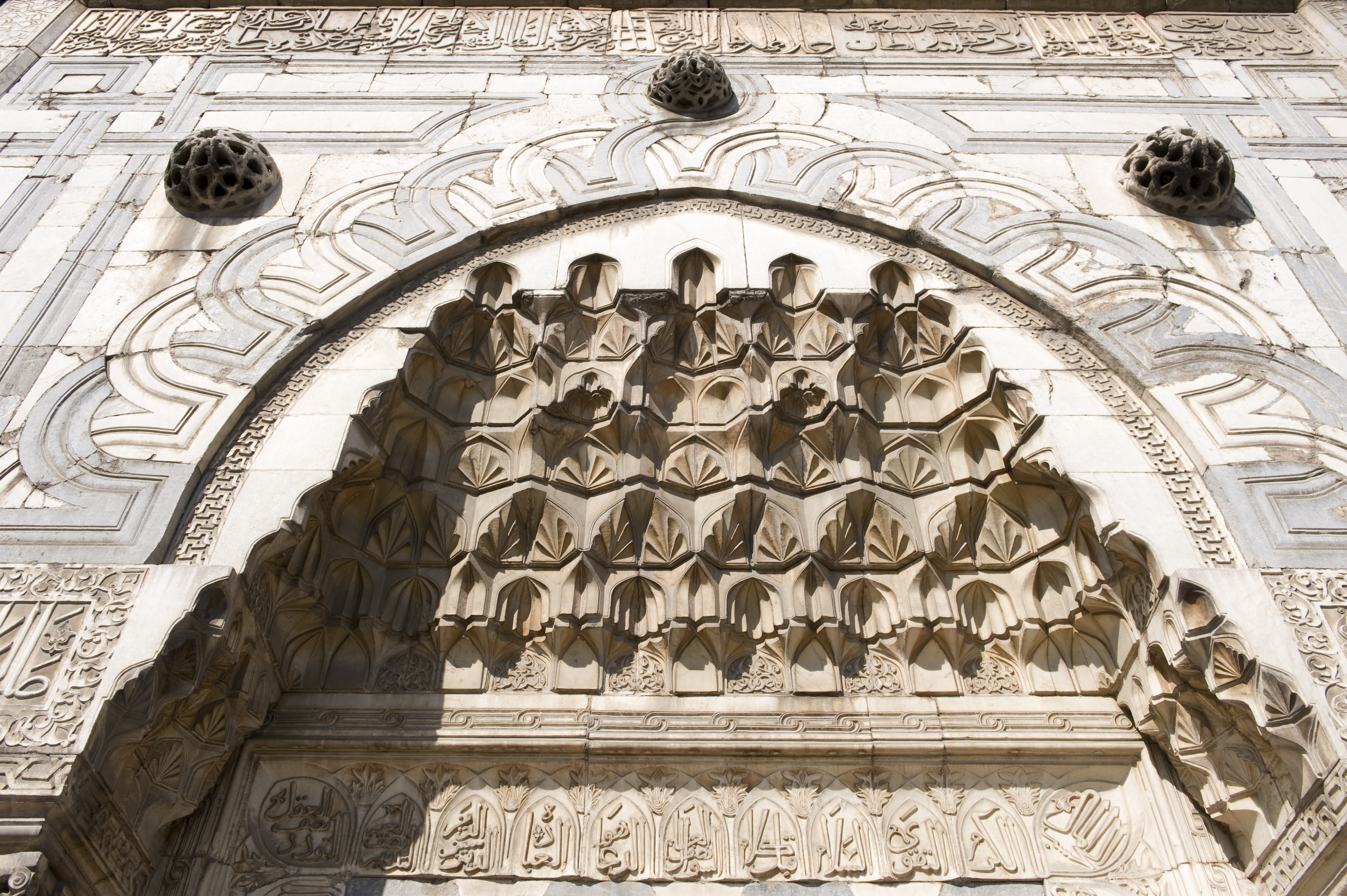
Detail of the ablaq and muqarnas stonework in the portal

The vestibule gives access to a larger domed hall or central court, measuring 12 by 12 metres (39 by 39 ft). In the middle of the hall is a square water basin. At the summit of the dome is an oculus about 5 metres (16 ft) wide. The dome and the transitional elements (also known as "Turkish triangles") below it are covered is covered by a rich revetment of tiles and mosaic tilework, predominantly in black and turquoise. The tiles feature elaborate geometric motifs, as well as interlacing Kufic inscriptions along the base of the dome and around the oculus. The lower areas of the walls are decorated with hexagonal turquoise tiles adorned with gold ornamentation, most of which are inscriptions.

Around this main hall a number of doorways lead to what were formerly small private rooms or sleeping quarters for students, but these fell into ruin by the 20th century and their current form dates from a reconstruction in the 1970s. On the west side of the hall is an iwan (a vaulted room that opens directly on the main hall). Two domed rooms also exist on either side of the iwan, accessed directly from the main hall. These were likely classrooms, of which the iwan was likely the main one while the others may have been intended for winter use. The one on the north side of the iwan was also ruined in modern times. The southern one was used as a burial chamber and contains a cenotaph, most likely that of the founder, Jalal ad-Din Qaratay.

Interior

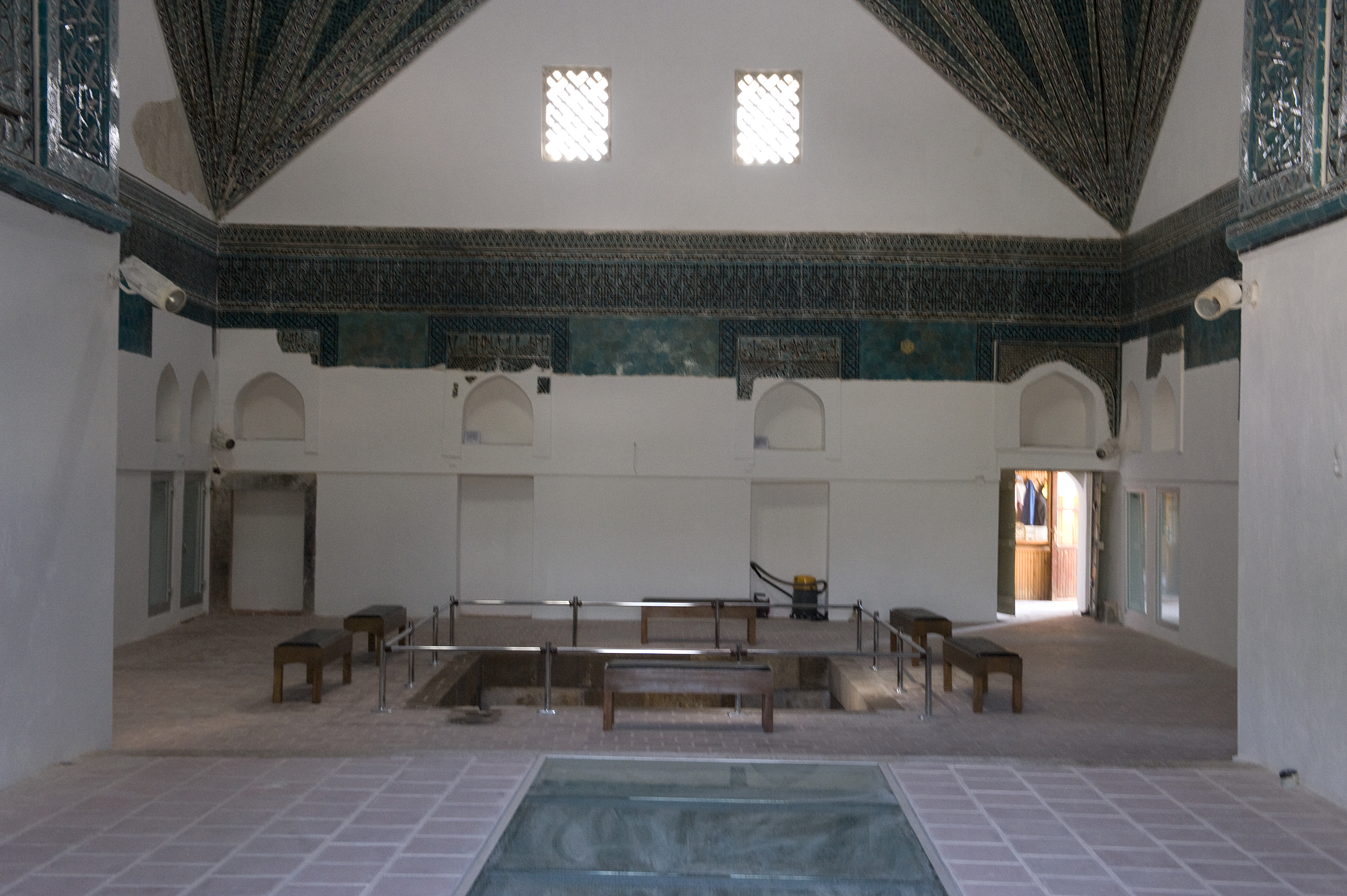
Main hall of the madrasa/museum

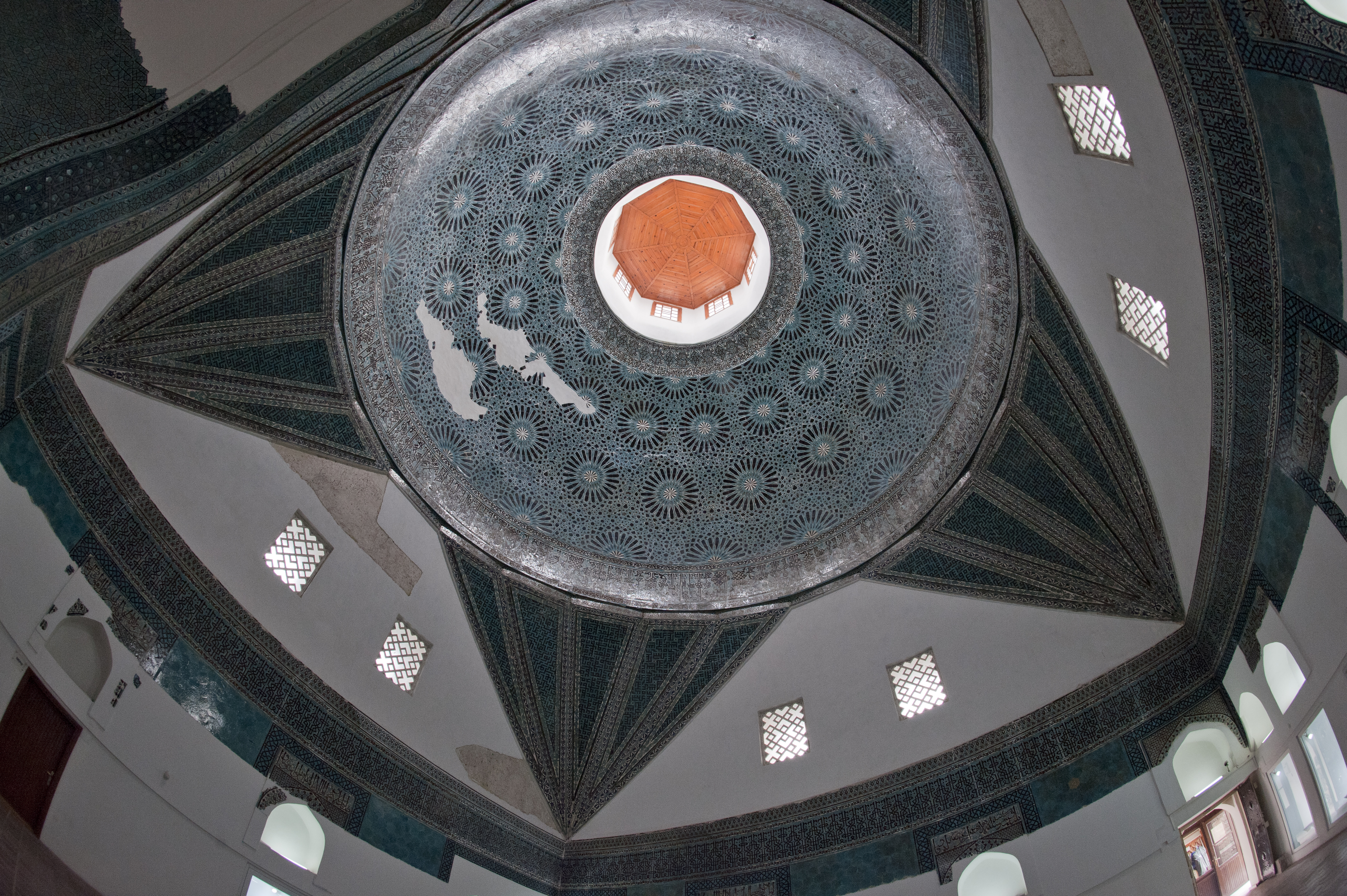
Dome above the main hall

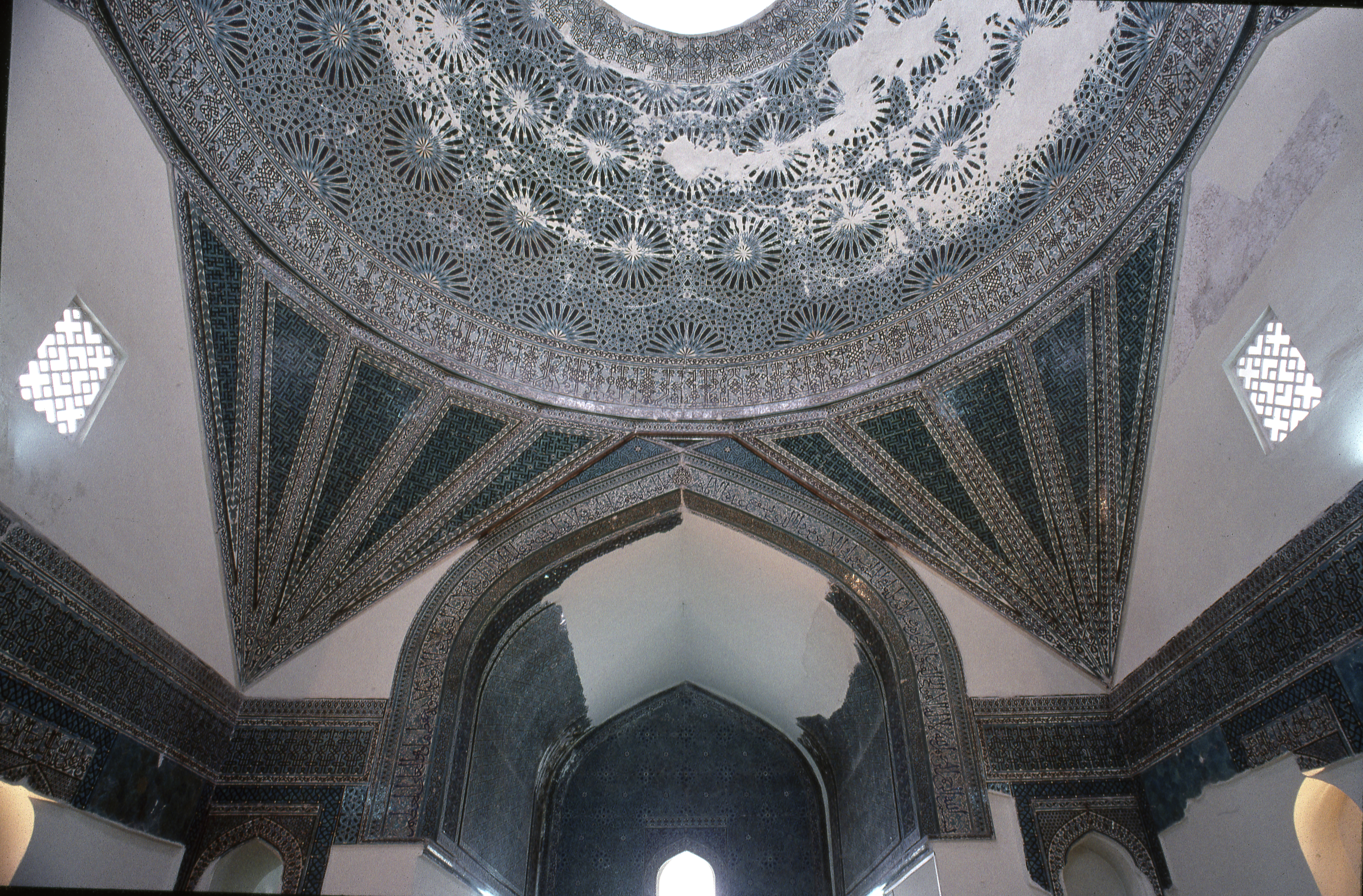
View of the dome transition, with the arch of the iwan visible below it

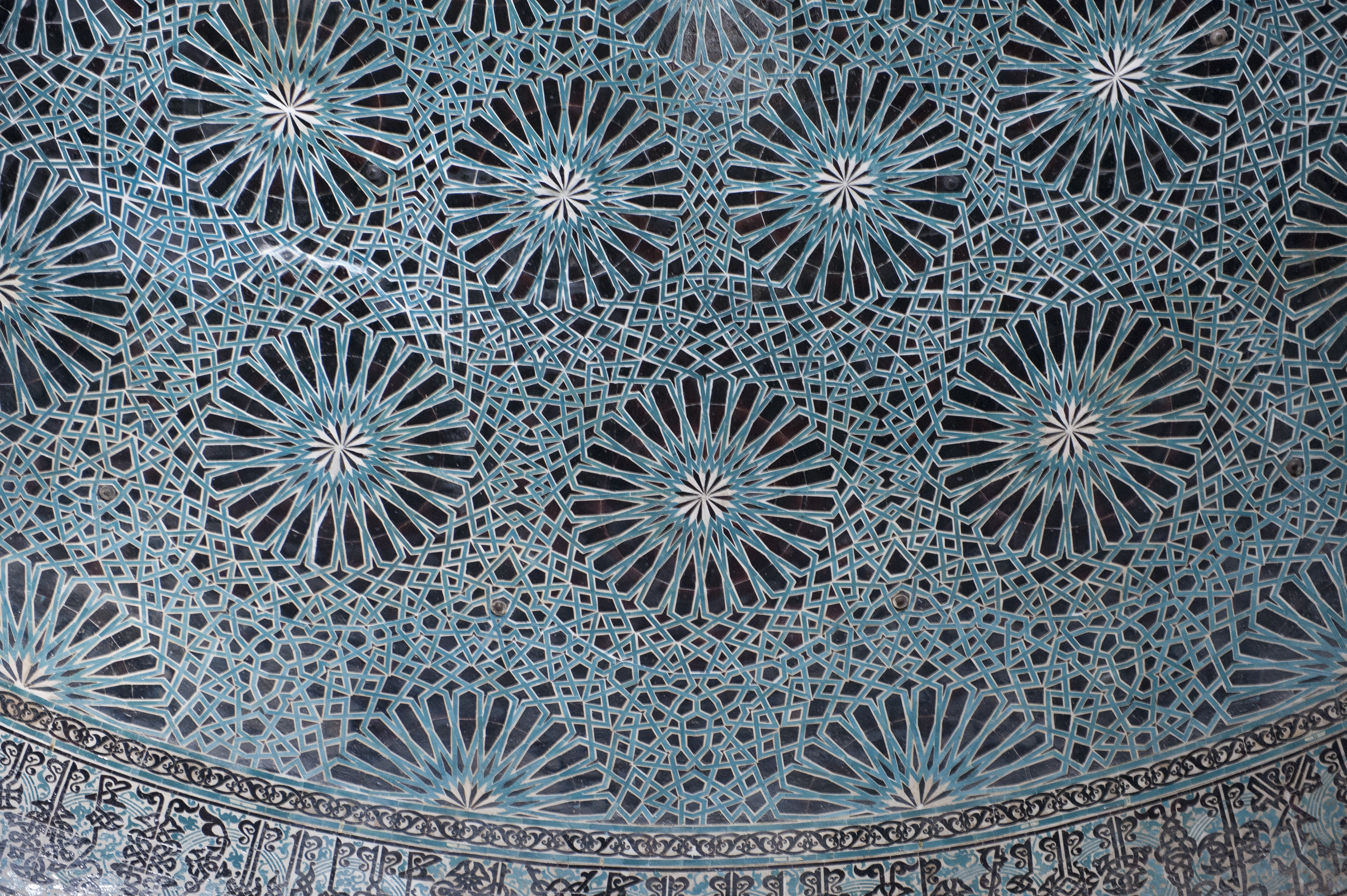
Detail of tilework in the dome

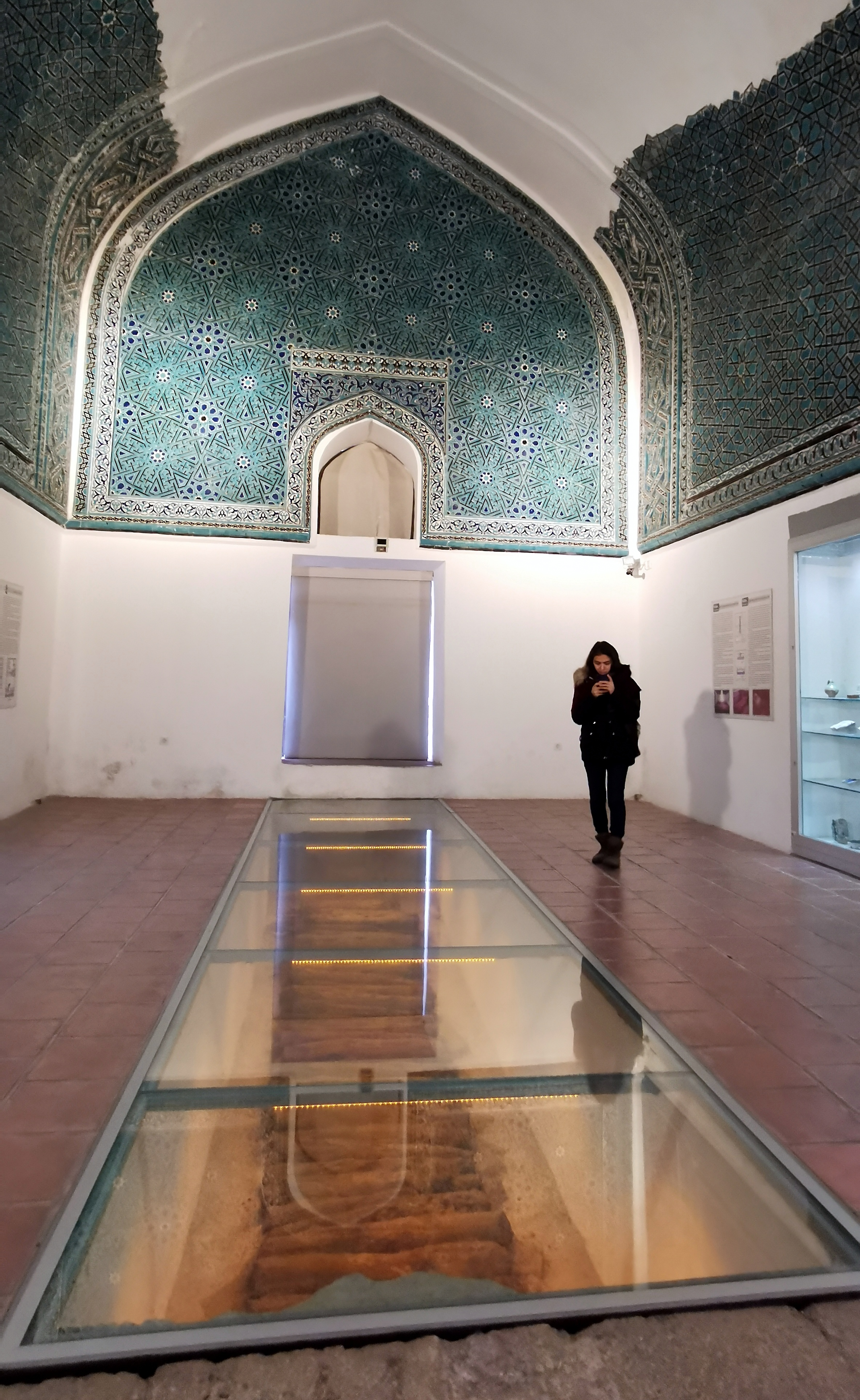
The iwan branching off the main hall

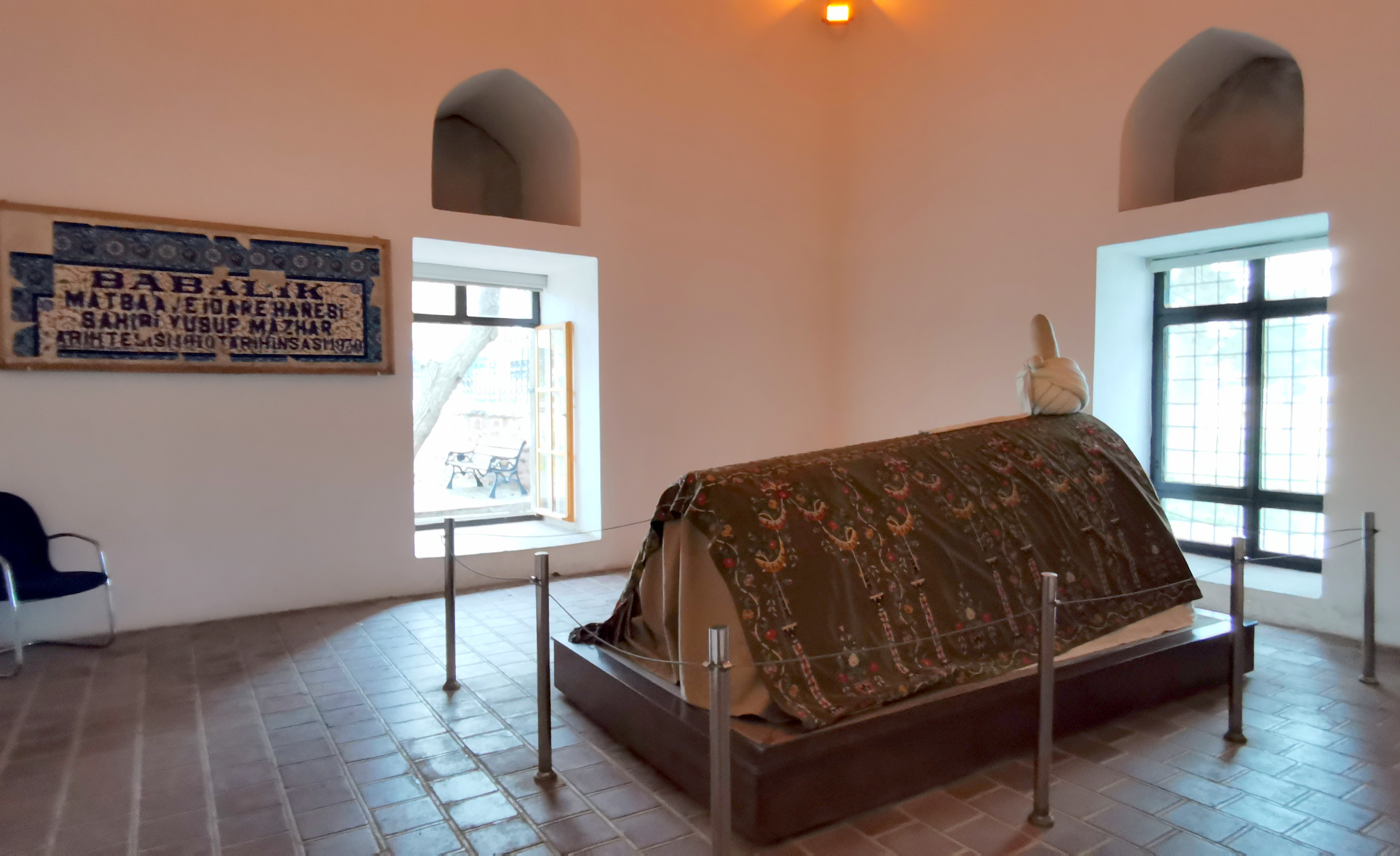
Tomb chamber at the southwest corner, where Jalal al-Din Qaratay is likely buried

== Museum ==
Since 1954, the place serves as a museum where Seljuk tiles are united, while artifacts in stone or in wood are on display in İnce Minareli Medrese, also in Konya. The collection of Karatay Museum was particularly enriched by the finds collected from the Kubadabad Palace royal summer residence on Lake Beyşehir shore, at eighty miles from Konya to the west, which was excavated since the 1960s.

A restoration of the building was carried out in 2006. Another restoration project was in progress as of 2019.

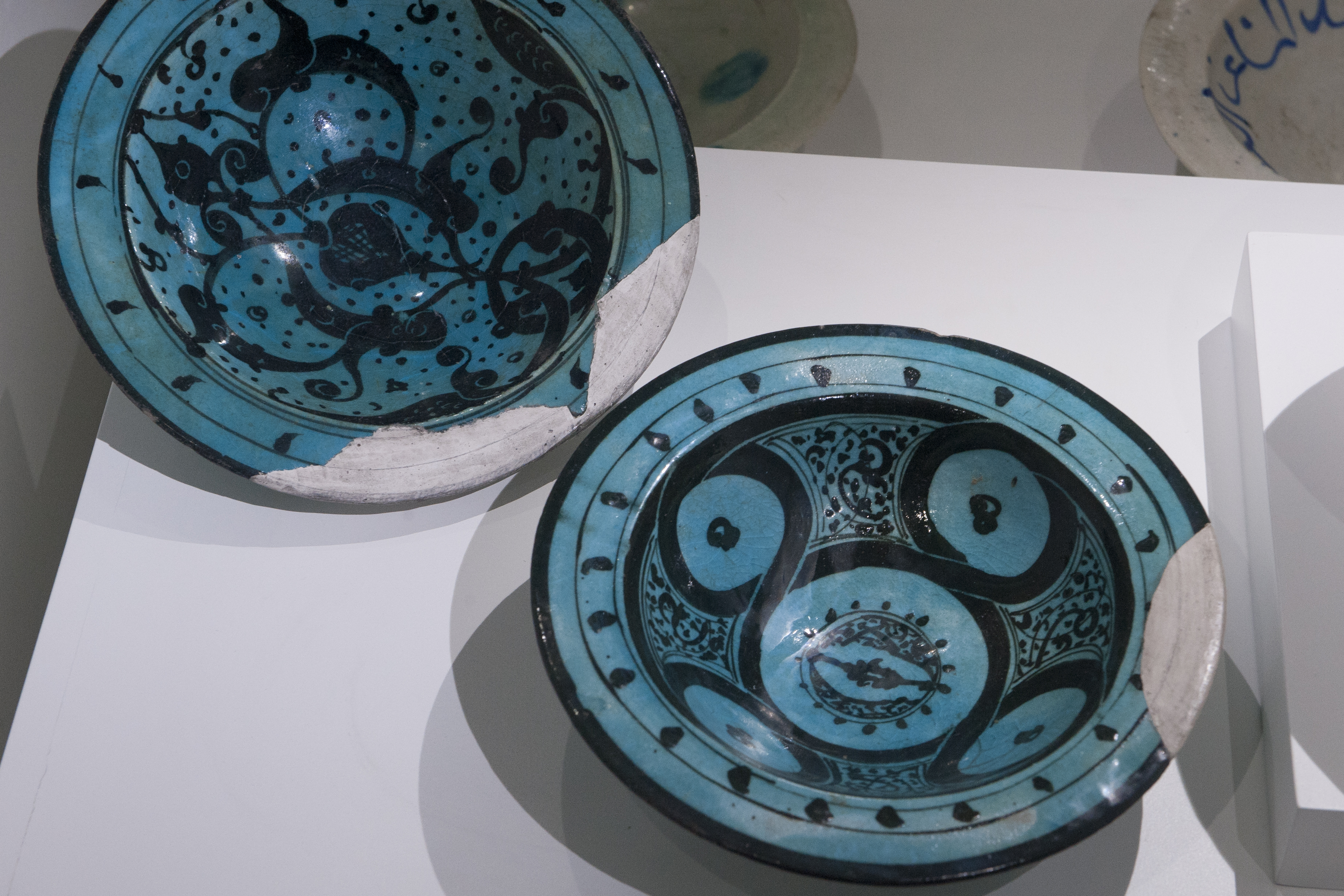
Ceramic plates on display as part of the museum

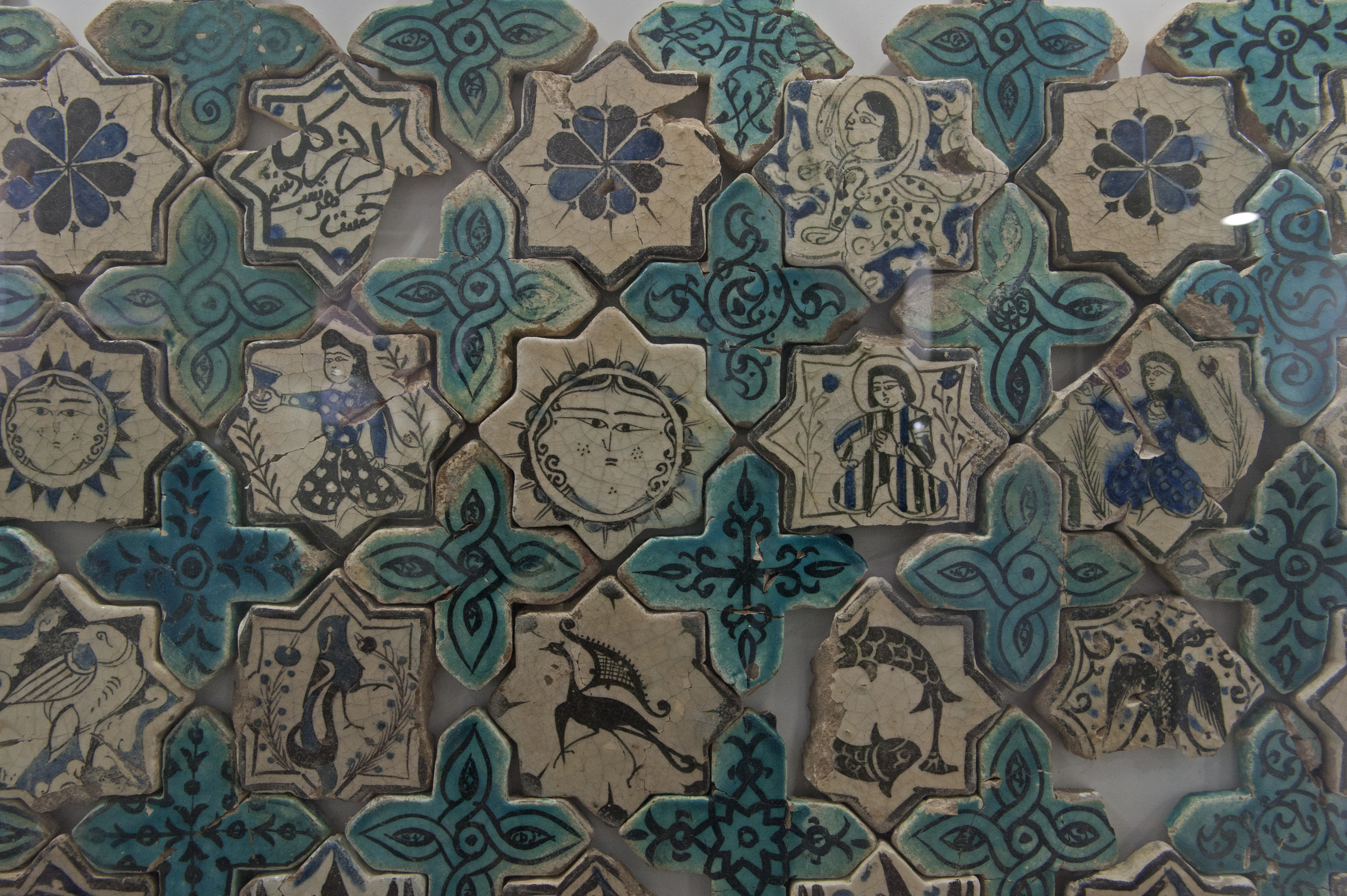
Reconstituted tile mosaic from Kubadabad Palace on display

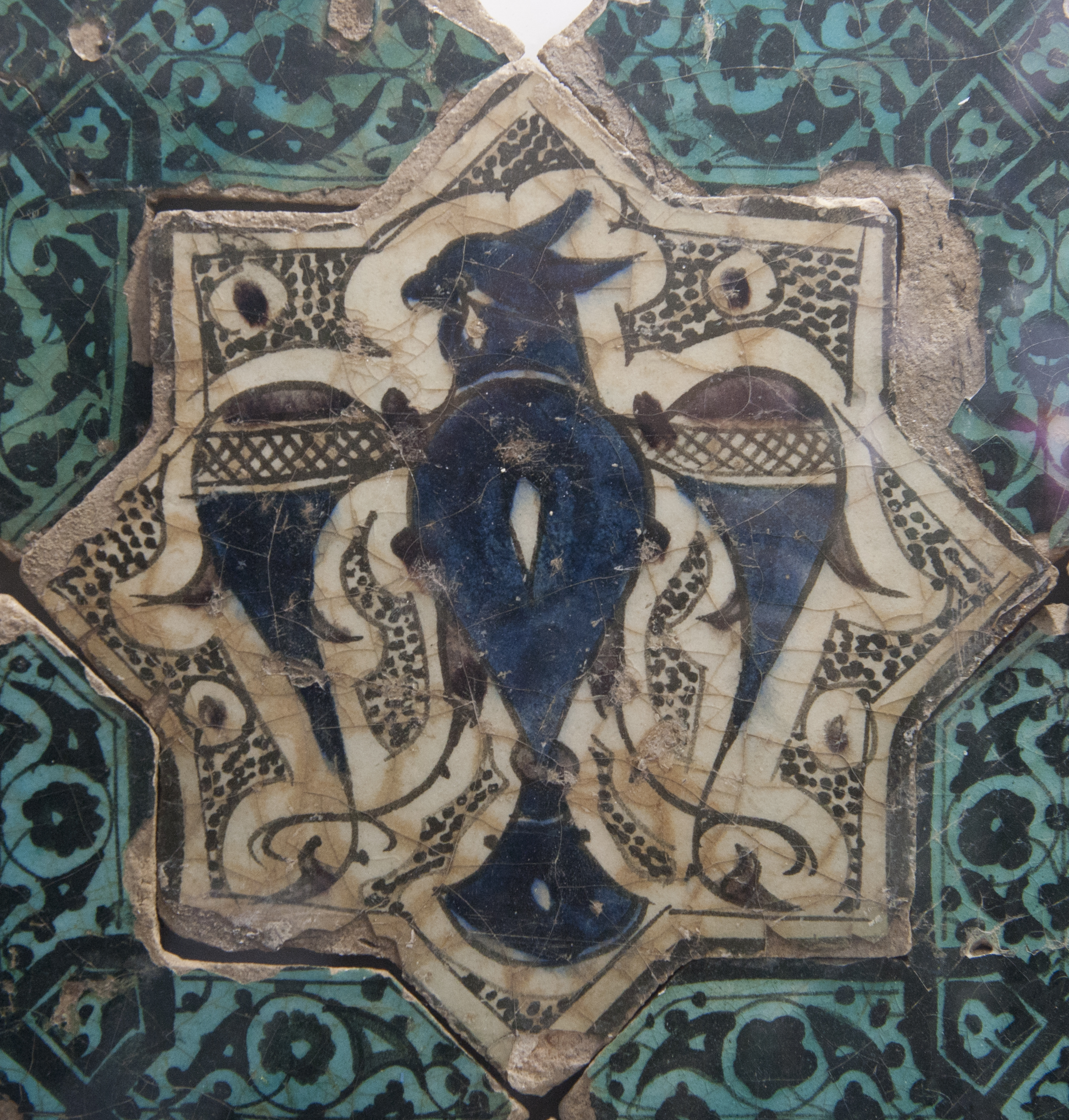
Kubadabad Palace tile

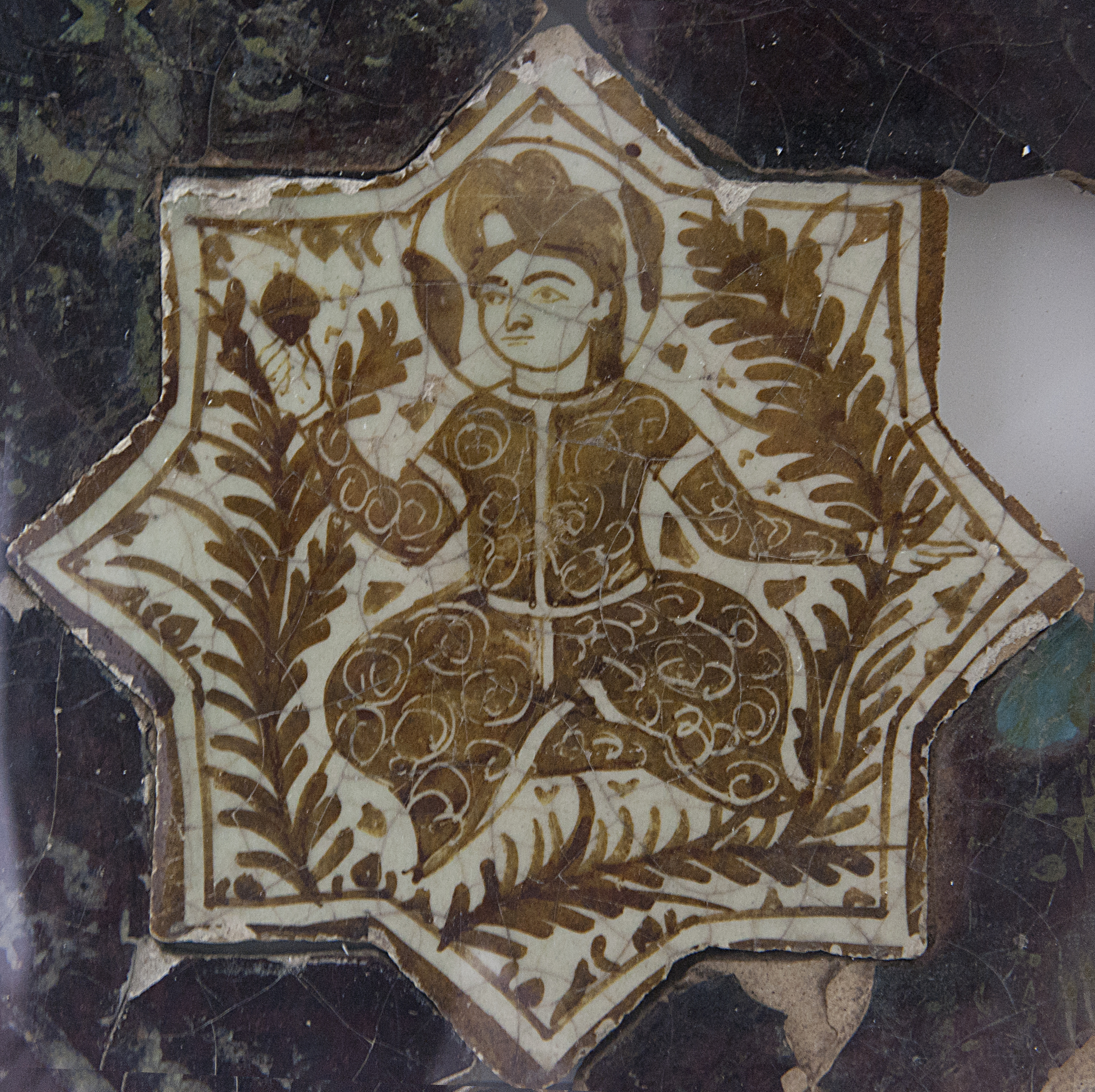
Kubadabad Palace tile

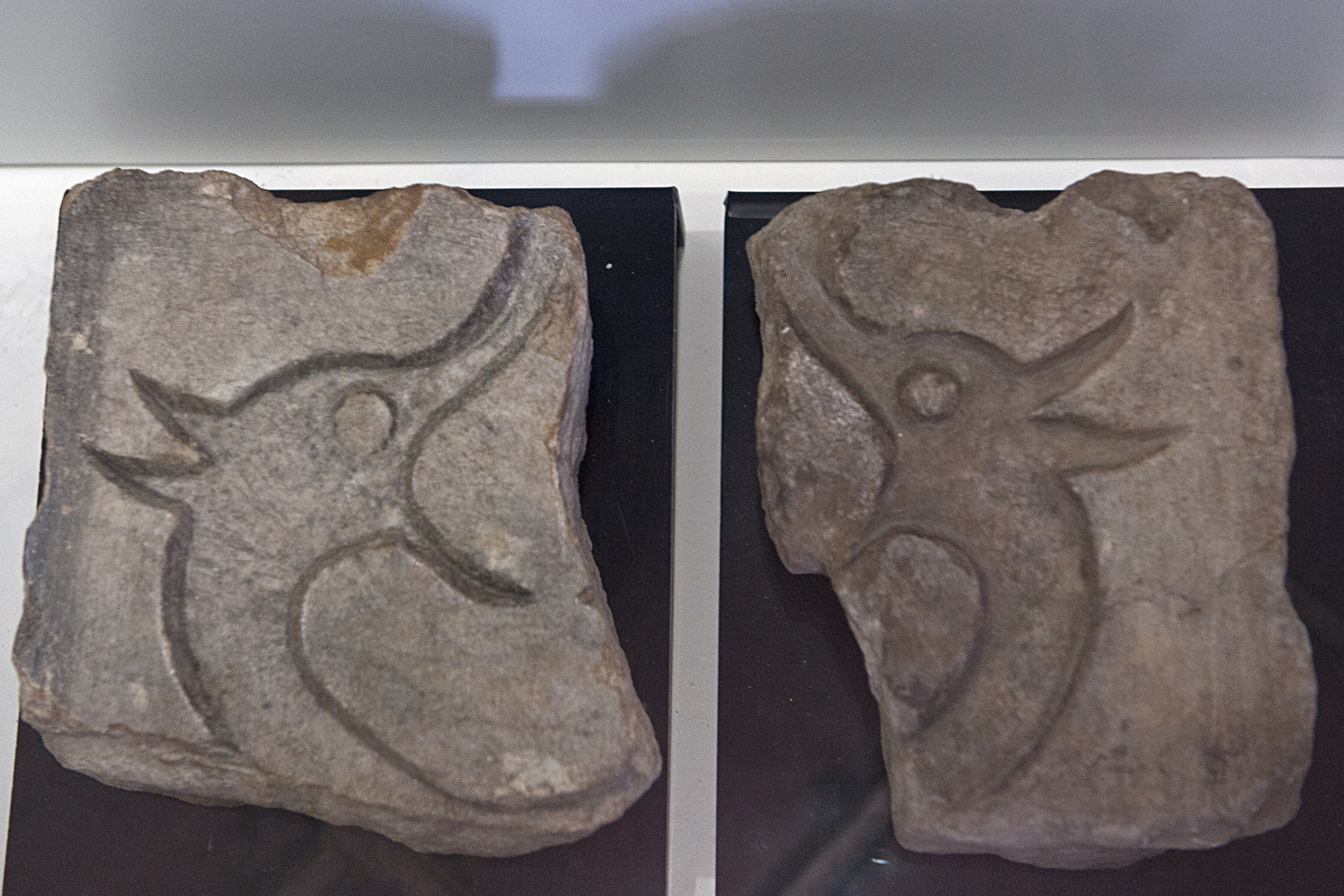
Fragments of gypsum decorations
