= Artuklu (disambiguation) =

Artuklu is another name of the Artuqids, a dynasty in Anatolia.

Artuklu may also refer to:

- Artuklu, Mardin, a district of Mardin Province, Turkey
- Artuklu Ilgazi, a bey of that dynasty
- Artuklu Palace, a palace near Diyarbakir, Turkey
