= Kubadabad Palace =

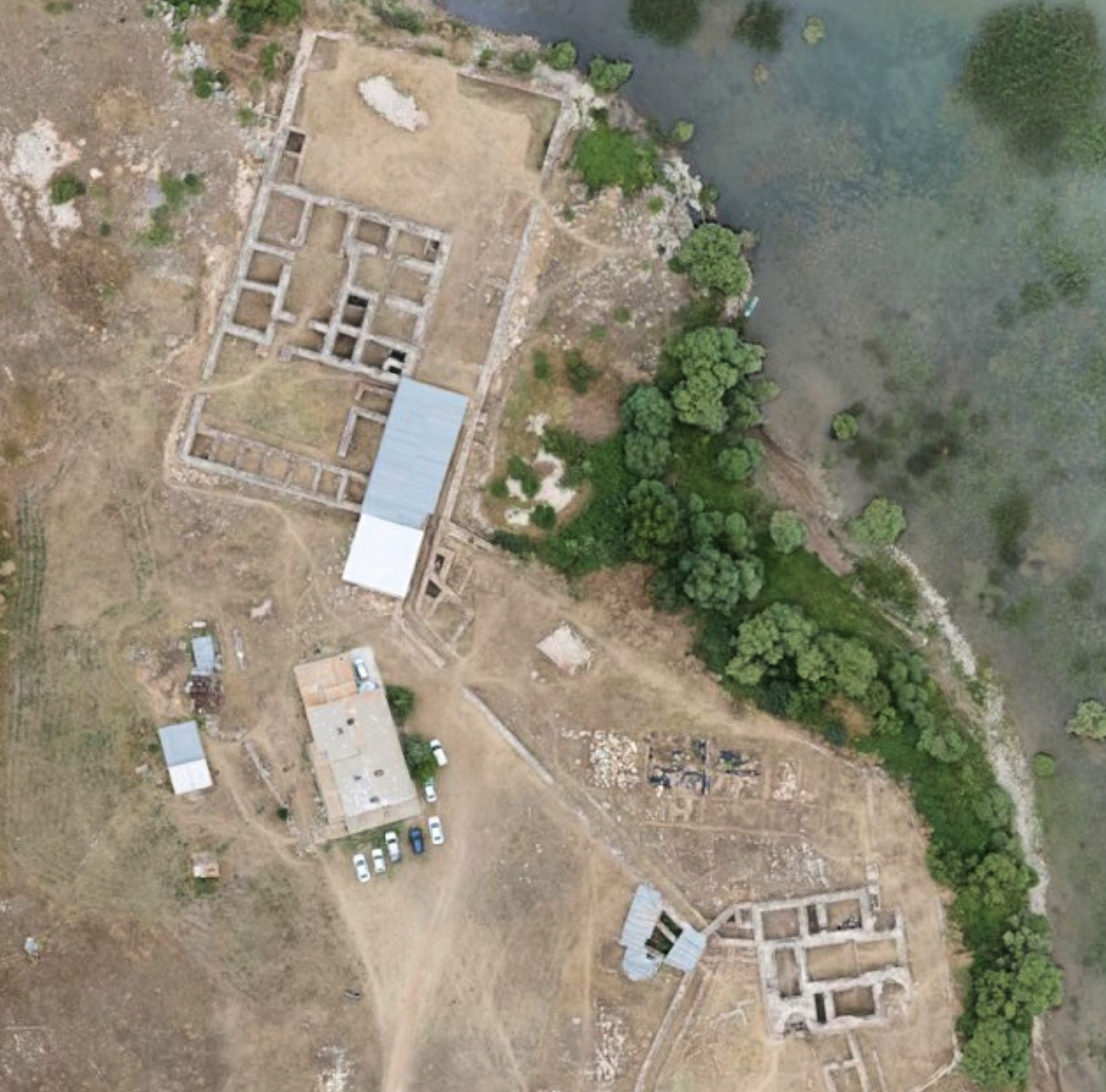
- Great Palace (top) and Small Palace (bottom) of Kubadabad

- Location within Turkey

General information
- Type: Palace
- Location: Lake Beyşehir, Turkey
- Coordinates: 37°44′36.5″N 31°26′21.4″E
- Construction started: Early 13th century
- Owner: Turkish state

Kubadabad Palace or Kubad Abad Palace (also spelled Qubadabad Palace; Turkish: Kubadabad Sarayı) was a complex of summer residences built for sultan Kayqubad I (1220–1237), ruler of the Sultanate of Rum. The palace is located on the southwestern shores of Lake Beyşehir in south-west Central Anatolia, Turkey, just over 100 kilometers west of the Seljuq capital at Konya.

== Site ==
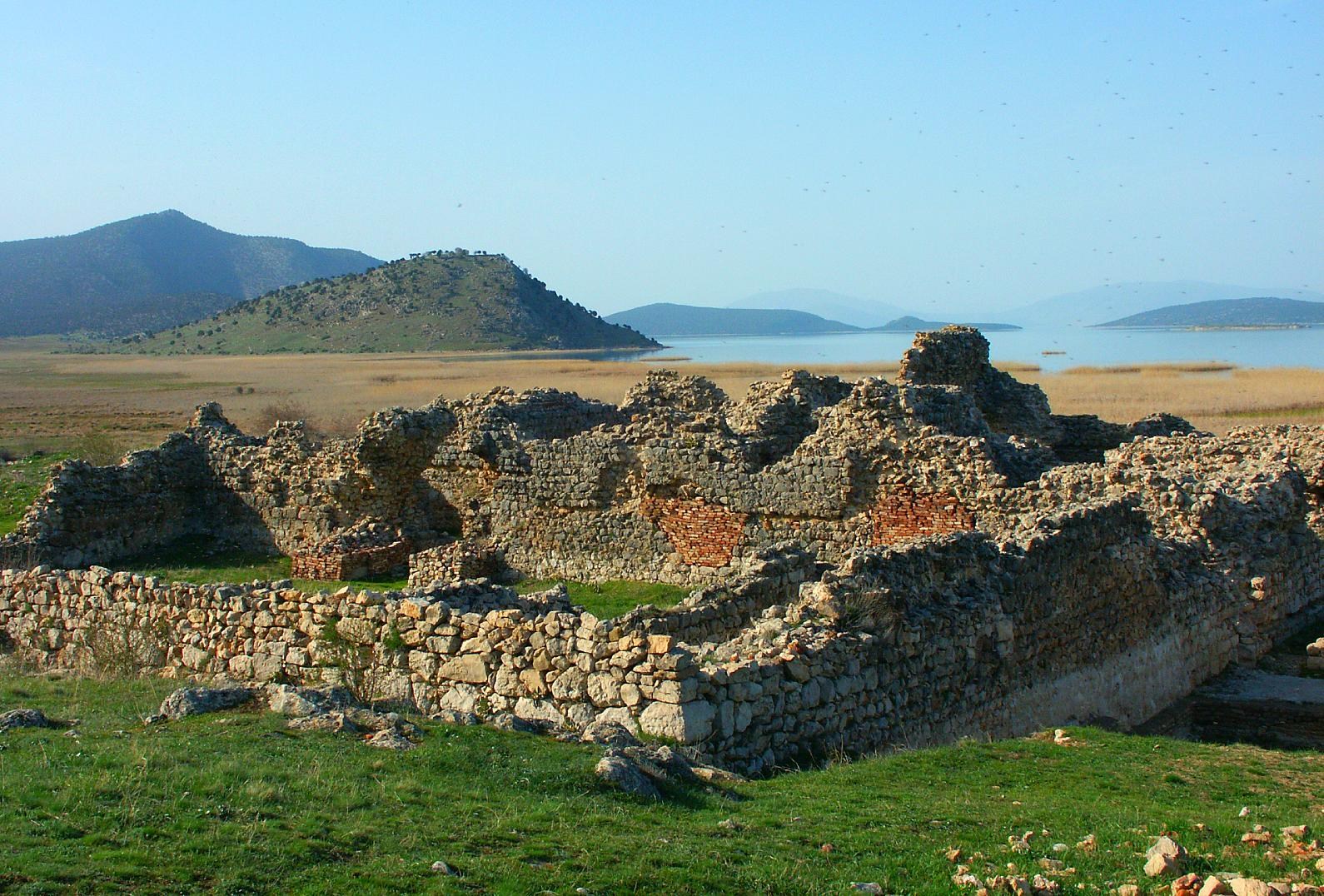
Site of the Kubadabad Palace

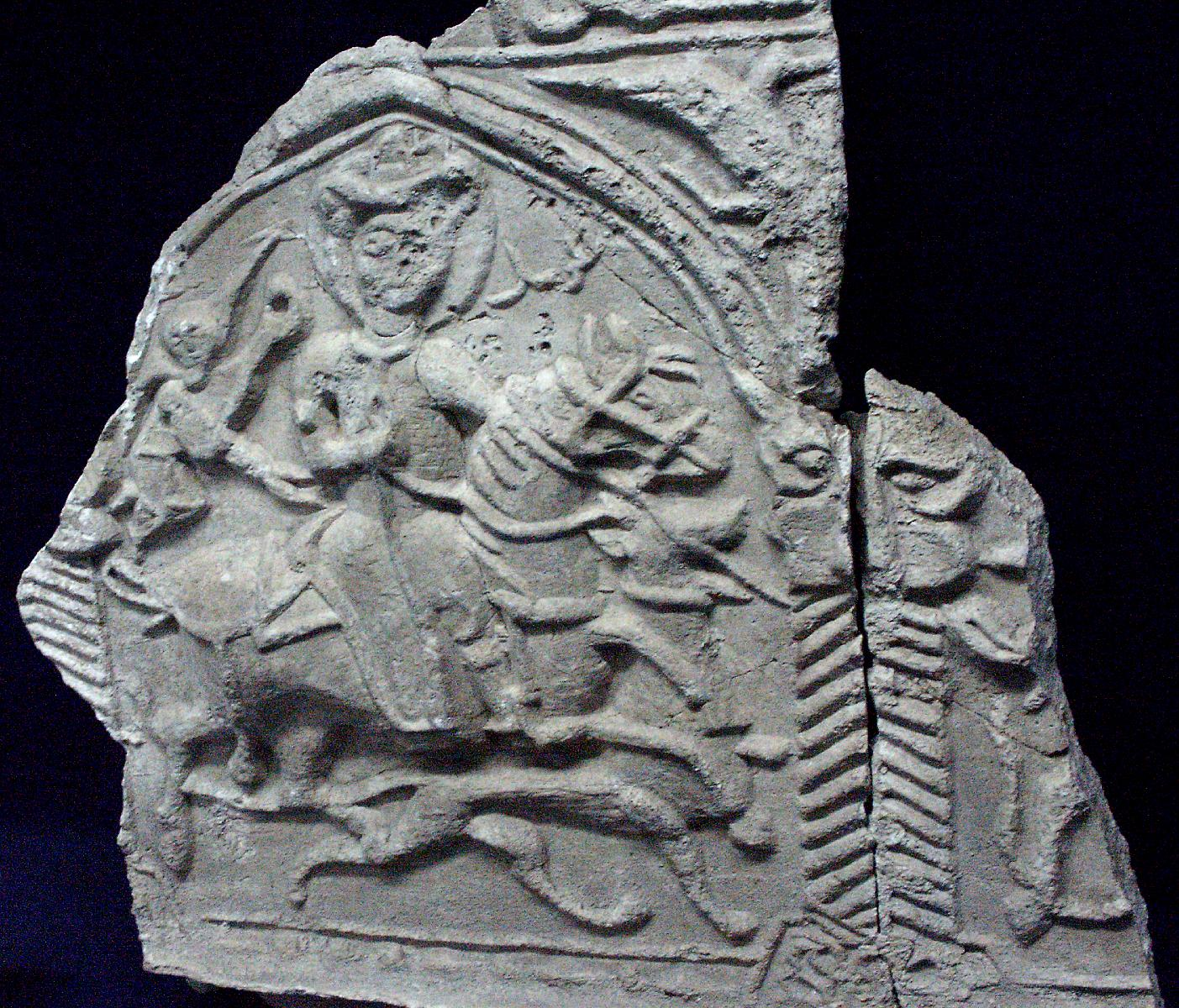
Relief from Kubadabad Palace, 13th century

The site was formerly only known from the descriptions of the contemporary historian Ibn Bibi, who wrote that toward the end of his reign, Kayqubad himself drew up plans for the palace and assigned responsibility for its completion to his vizier Sa'd al-Din Köpek. The palace remains were discovered in 1949 and subsequently excavated, first in the 1960s by German archaeologist Katharina Otto-Dorn and more recently by a team from Ankara University led by Rüçhan Arık.

The complex comprises sixteen buildings, including two palaces, the larger of which is known as the Great Palace and measures fifty by thirty-five metres. Among its features are a game park and a small wooden dockyard that replicates the Tersane at Alanya. The Great Palace is an asymmetrical structure incorporating a courtyard, guest rooms, a harem and eyvan. It is remarkable for its ornate figural tiles, and its innovative layout, modeled on the caravansarai, reflects a break with the traditional pavilion structure that characterised earlier palaces.

Kubadabad Palace is unusual for a Seljuq palace in that its location is so far from a fortified town, in contrast to palaces at Konya and Kayseri. Protection seems to have been provided by a fortress complex located on the nearby island of Kız Kalesi. Other ruins in the area include the important Hittite site of Eflatunpınar.

== Tiles ==
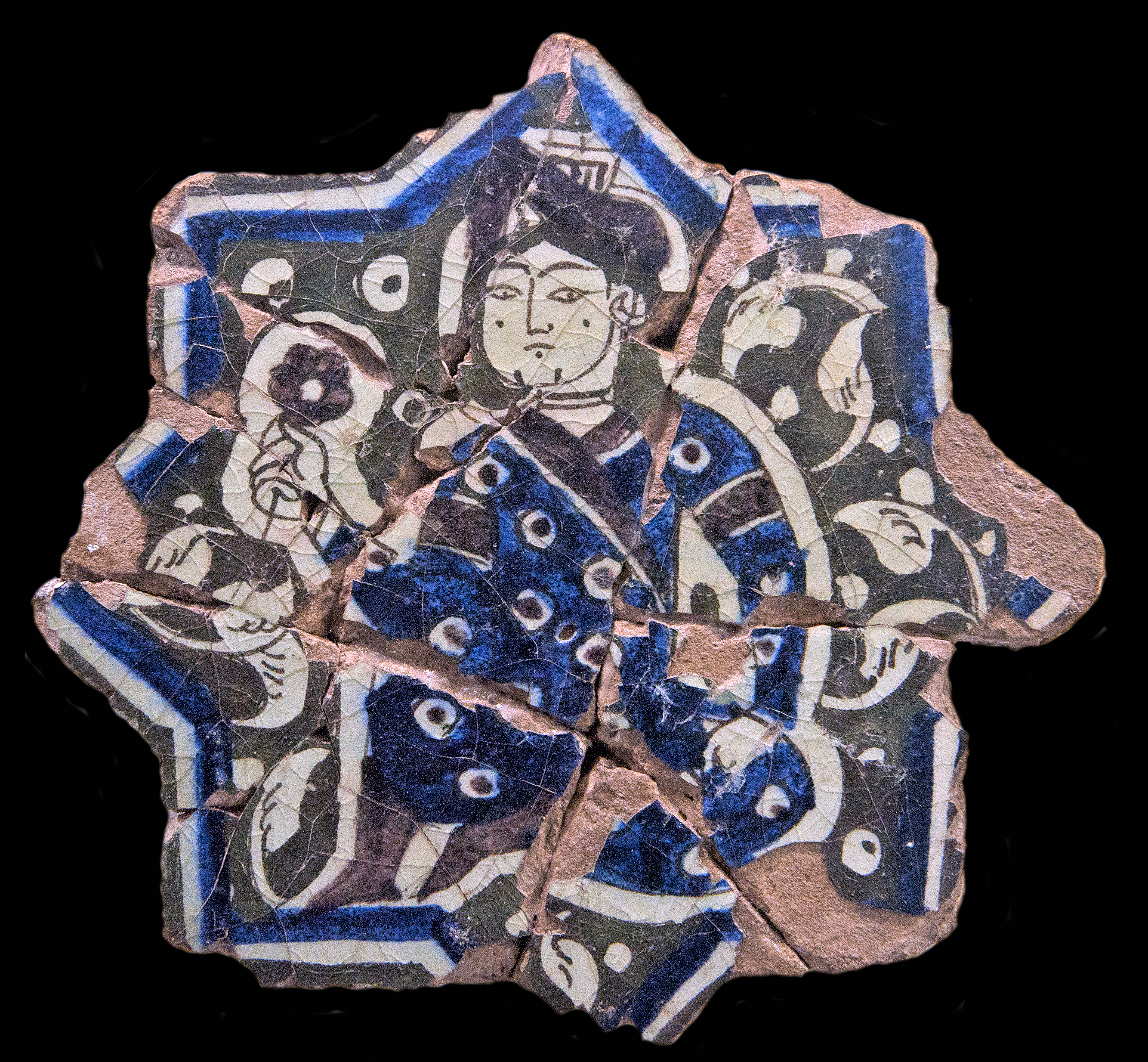
Sultan Kayqubad I (r.1220–1237) or a notable of his court, seated in Turkic style and holding a flower, symbol of eternal life. Kubadabad Palace, late 1220s.

Excavations at Kubadabad Palace uncovered a magnificent series of polychrome ceramic tiles now held in Konya's Karatay Museum. There is no other palace in the Islamic world with so varied a tile decoration. Painted with an underglaze of blue, purple, turquoise and green, the series consists of white, star-shaped figural panels alternating with turquoise crosses. Similar tiling has also been found on the Roman theater at Aspendos, which Kayqubad had converted into a palace. The subjects of the tiles include humans, and animals both real and fantastic. Of particular interest are two tiles thought to show a portrait of the sultan and another showing a double-headed eagle inscribed "al-sultān." The same symbols appear on other works sponsored by Kayqubad, such as the city walls of Konya.

=== Human figures ===
The figural tiles are decorated with court scenes representing the sultan, harem women, courtiers and servants. The Sultan and palace notables are shown sitting cross-legged in Turkish style. Most of the time they hold symbols of eternal life in their hands, such as pomegranate or opium branches.

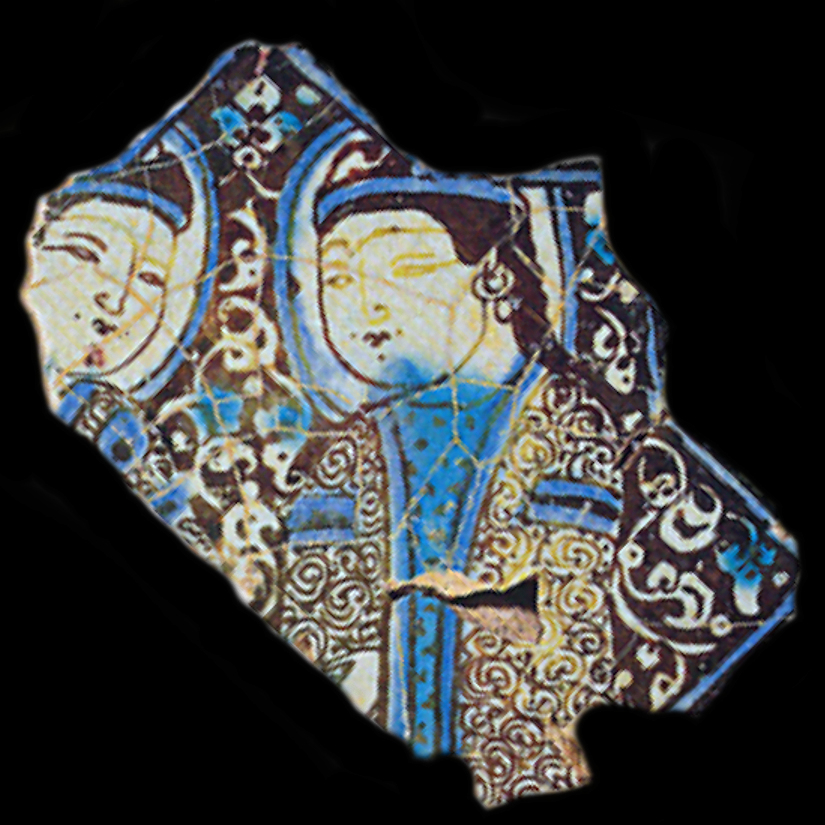
Conversation between two individuals. Small Palace of Kubadabad (1220s)

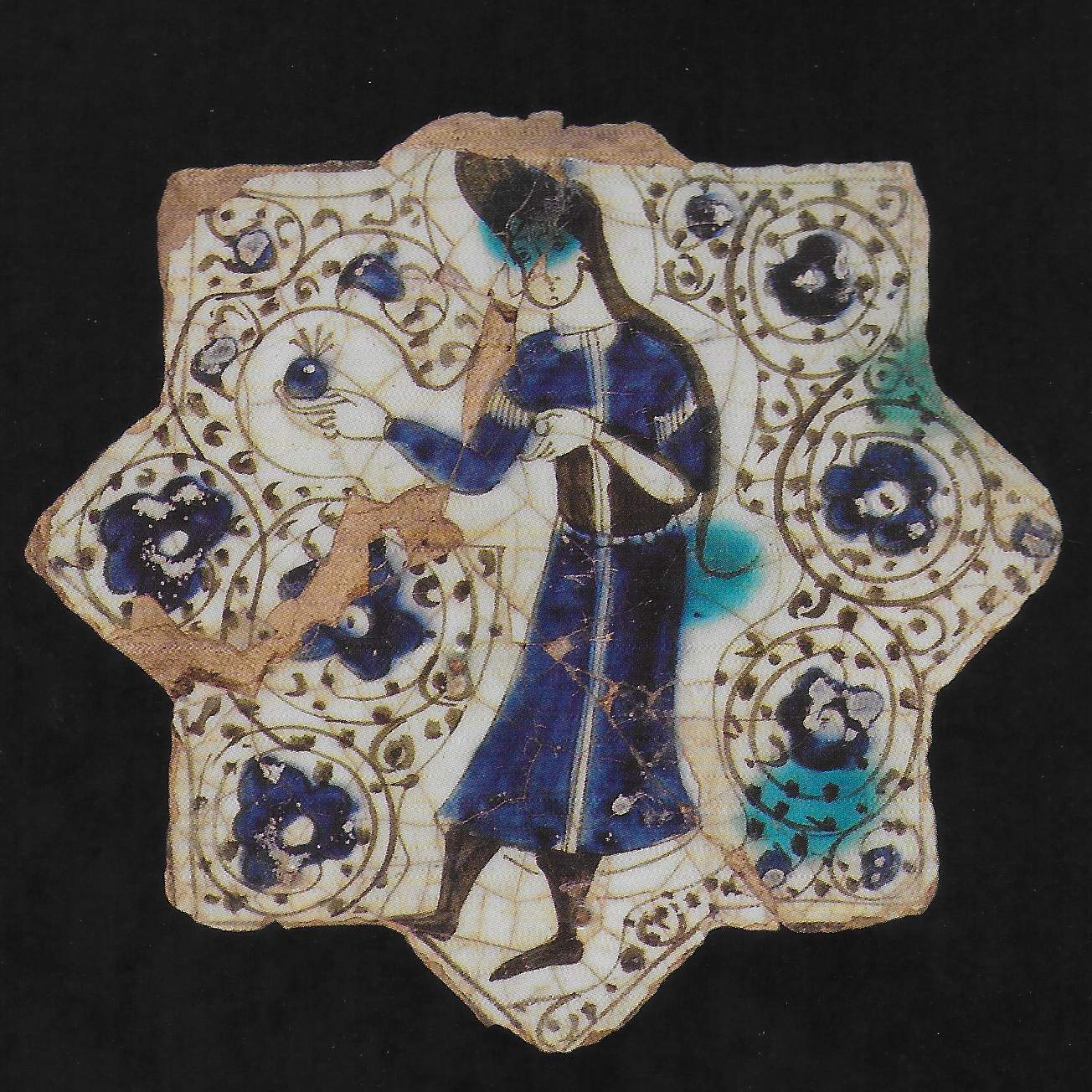
Tile with standing man holding a pomegranate. Late 1220s

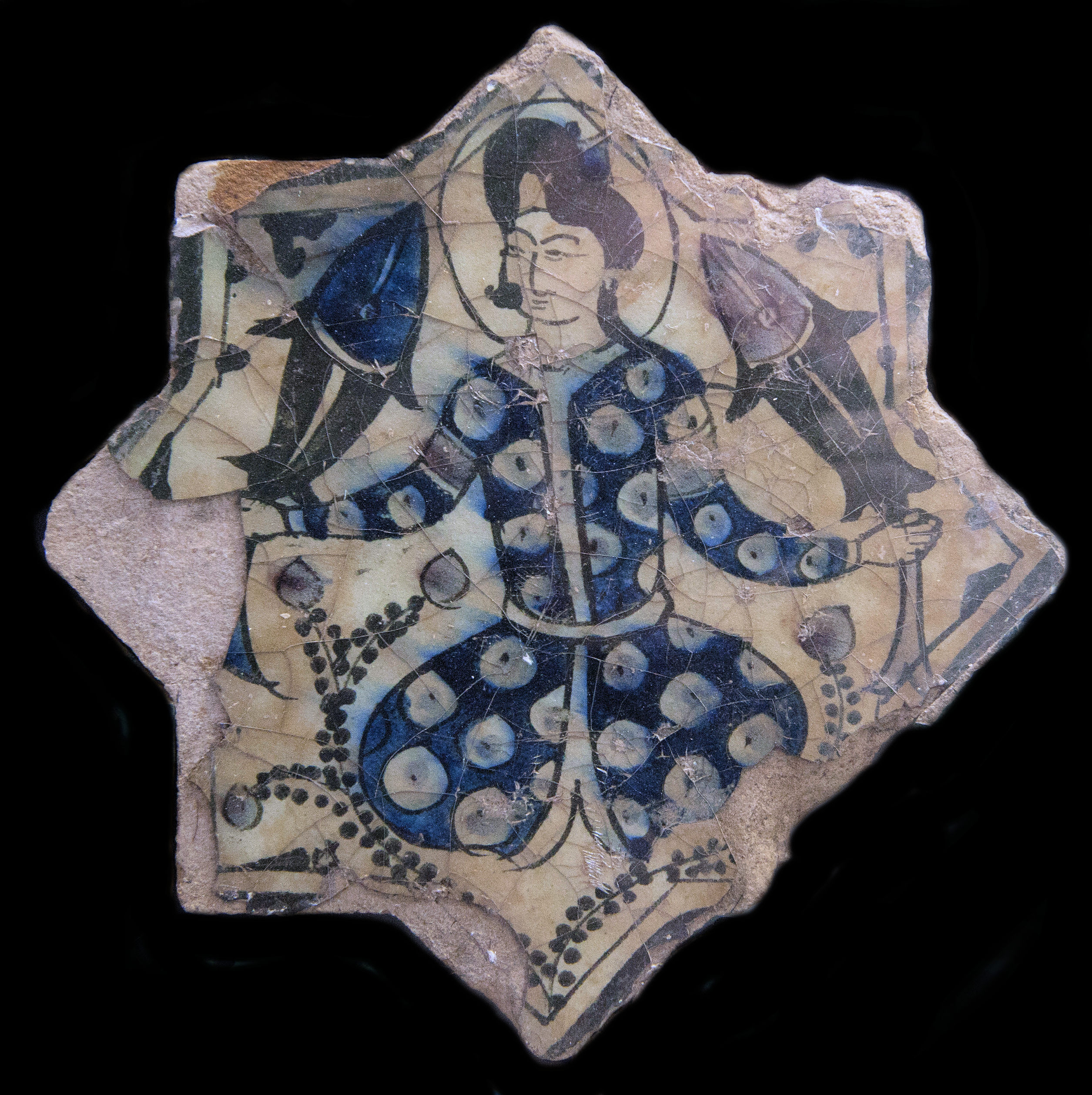
Man holding two fishes

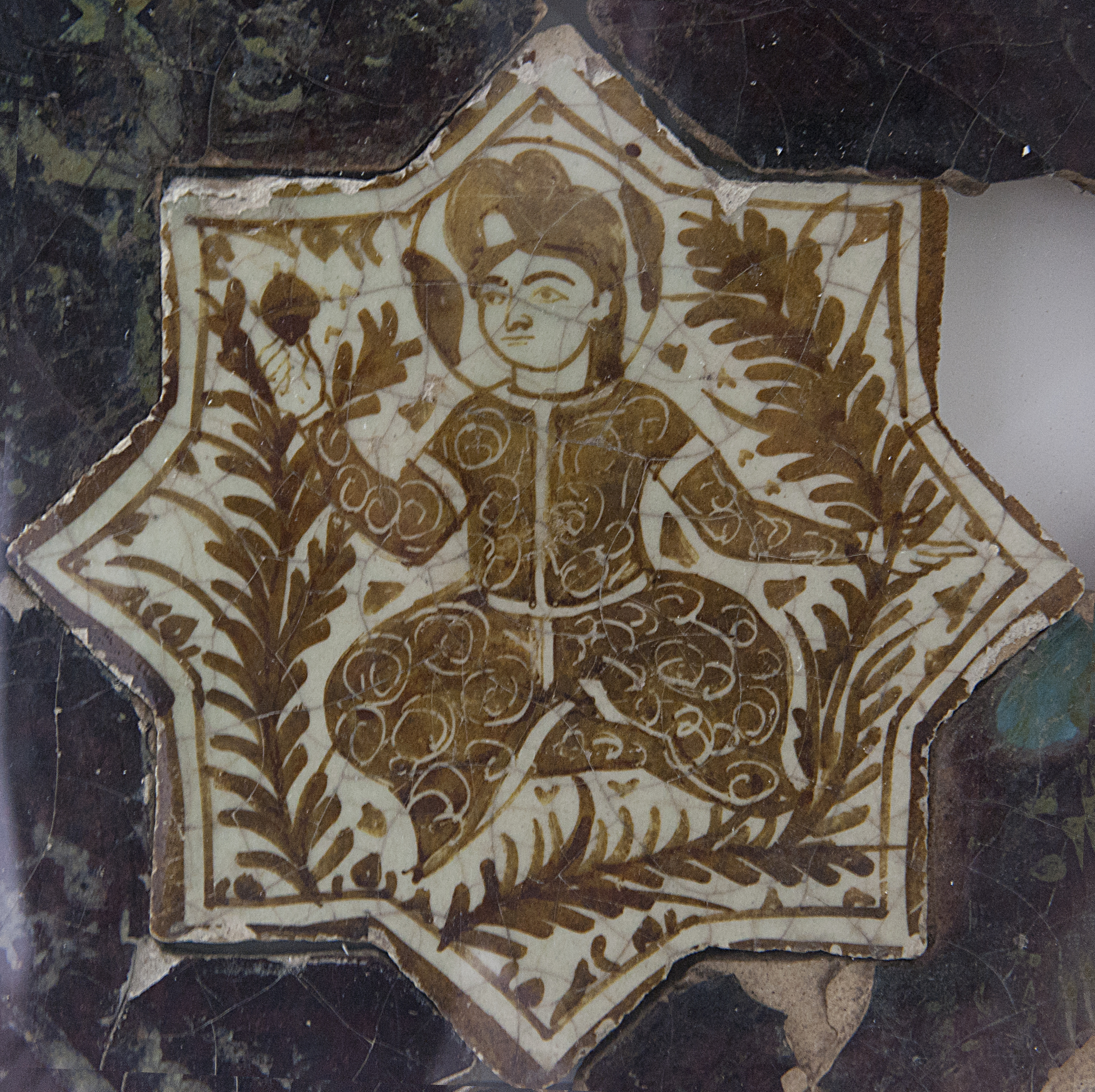

In 2012, a few enturbanned and bearded figures were discovered in the Small and the Large Palace, whose physical type is quite different from that of the other Turkic-style figures. They appear either holding pomegranates or offering inscribed tablets. The artistic quality is a bit inferior to that of the other tiles. It is thought that these figures represent high-ranking members of the palace or intellectuals.

=== Mythological animals ===
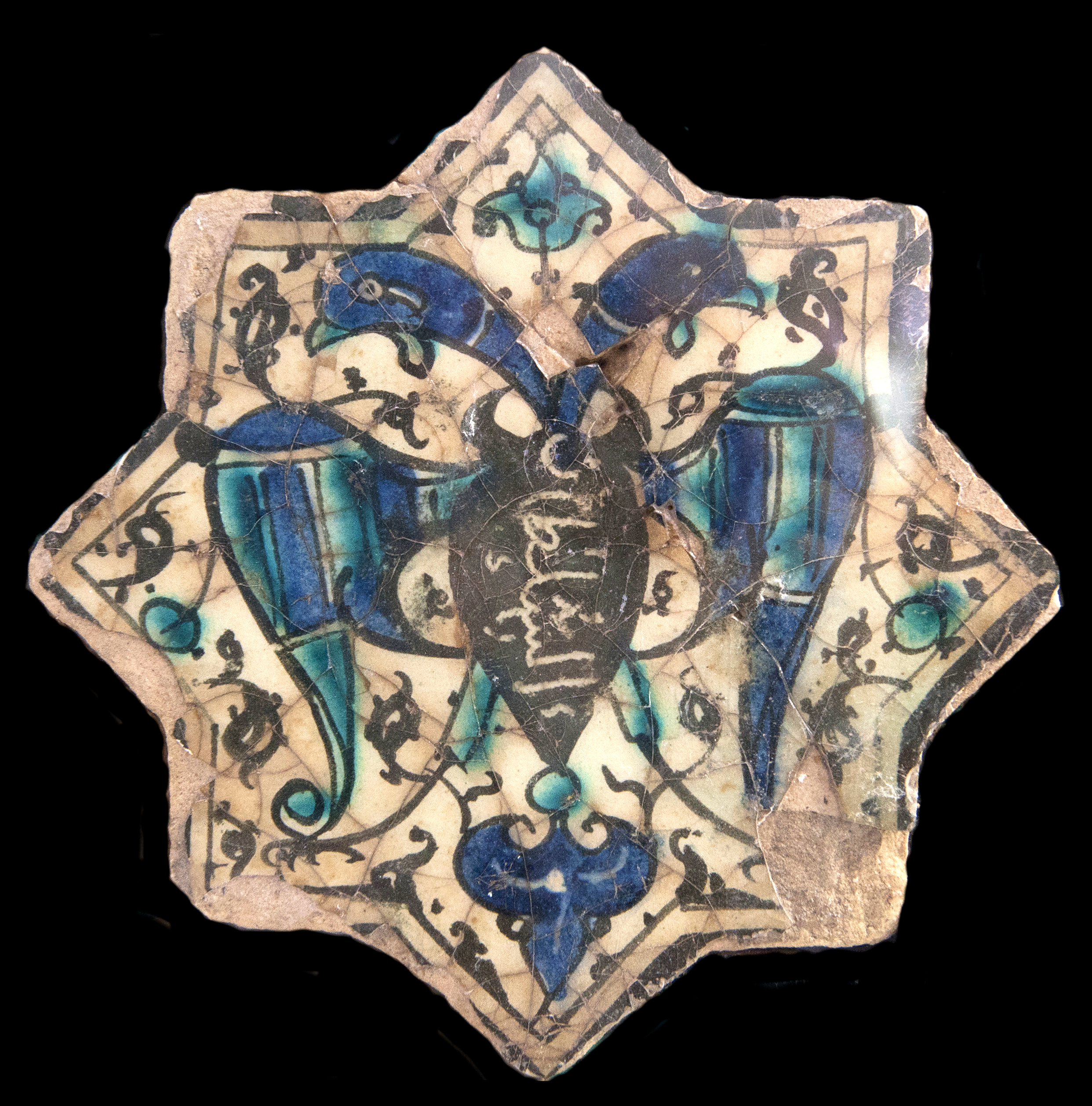
Double-headed eagle, with "al-Sultan" inscription on the chest. Kubadabad Palace, 1220s.

Other tiles represent hunting scenes, and imaginary or magical animals related to the figural art of the Seljuks.

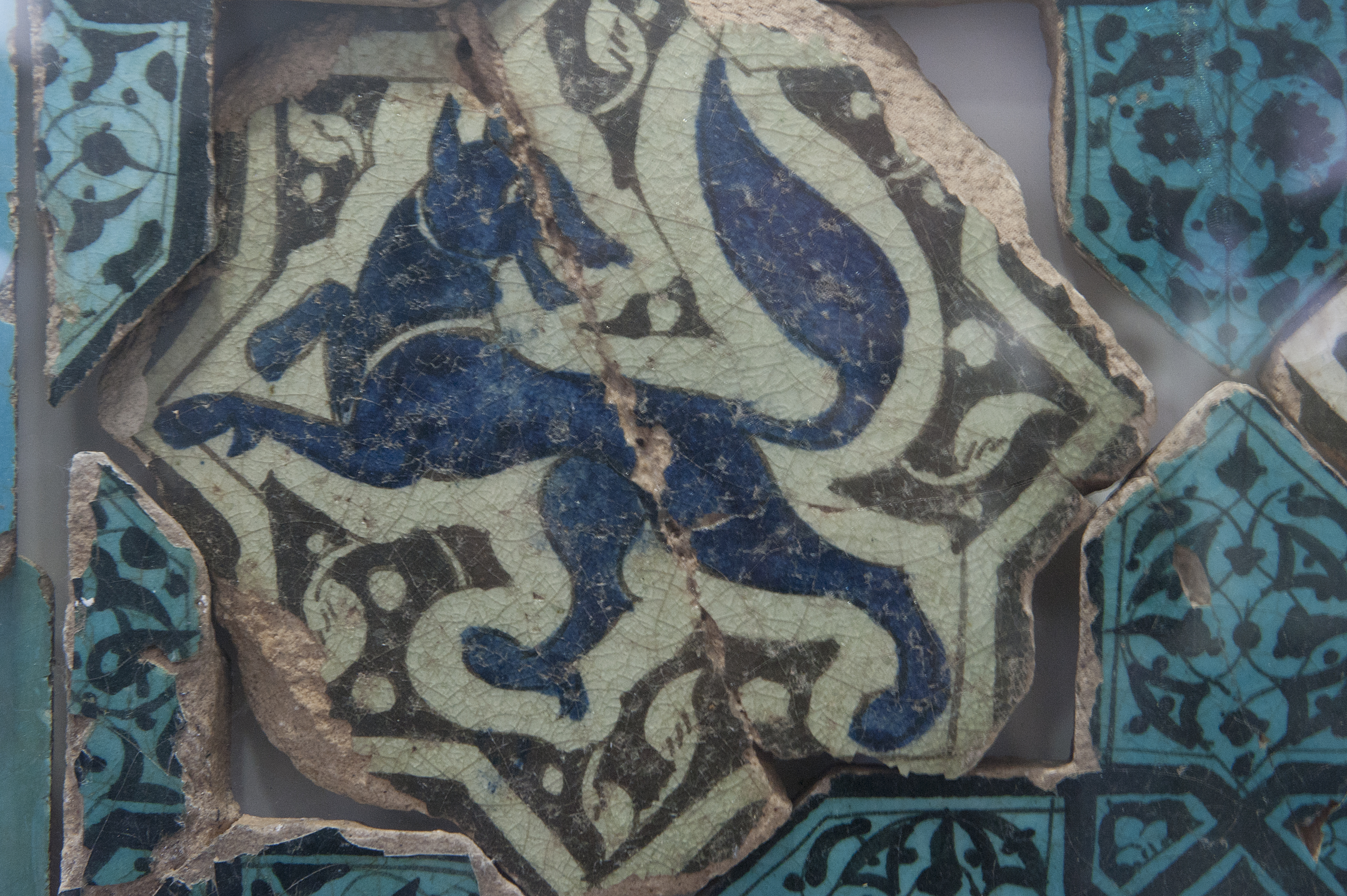

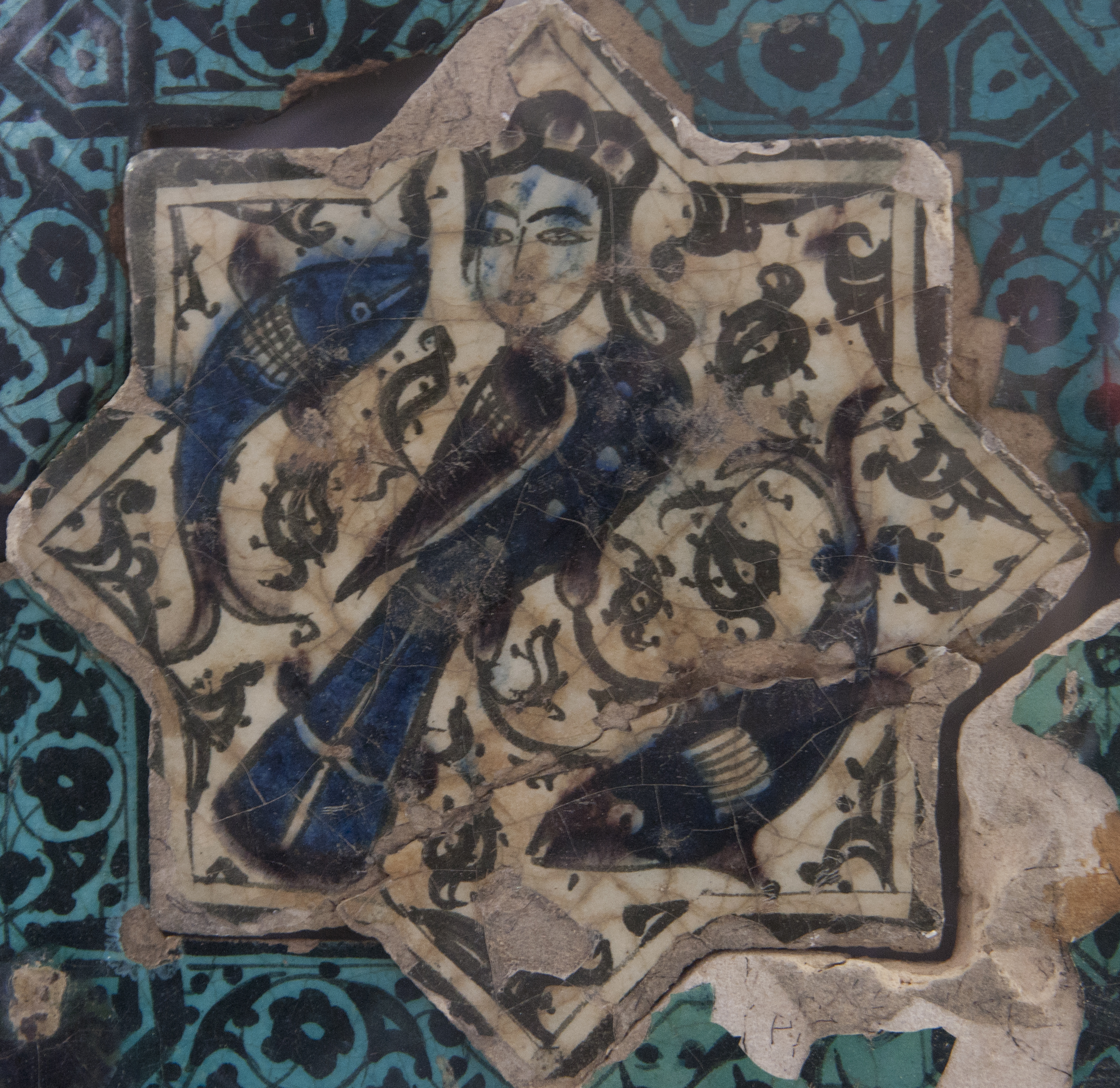

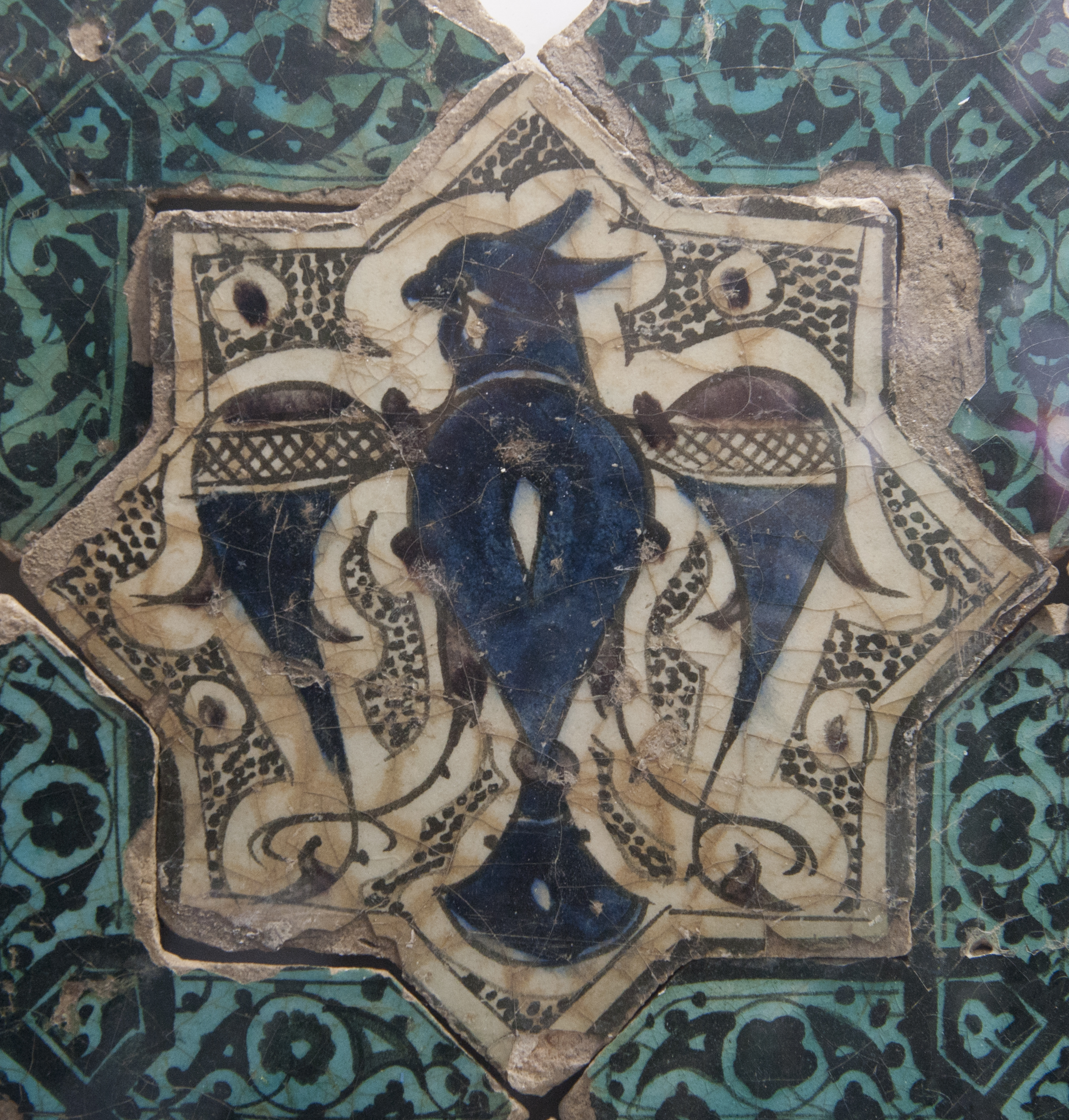

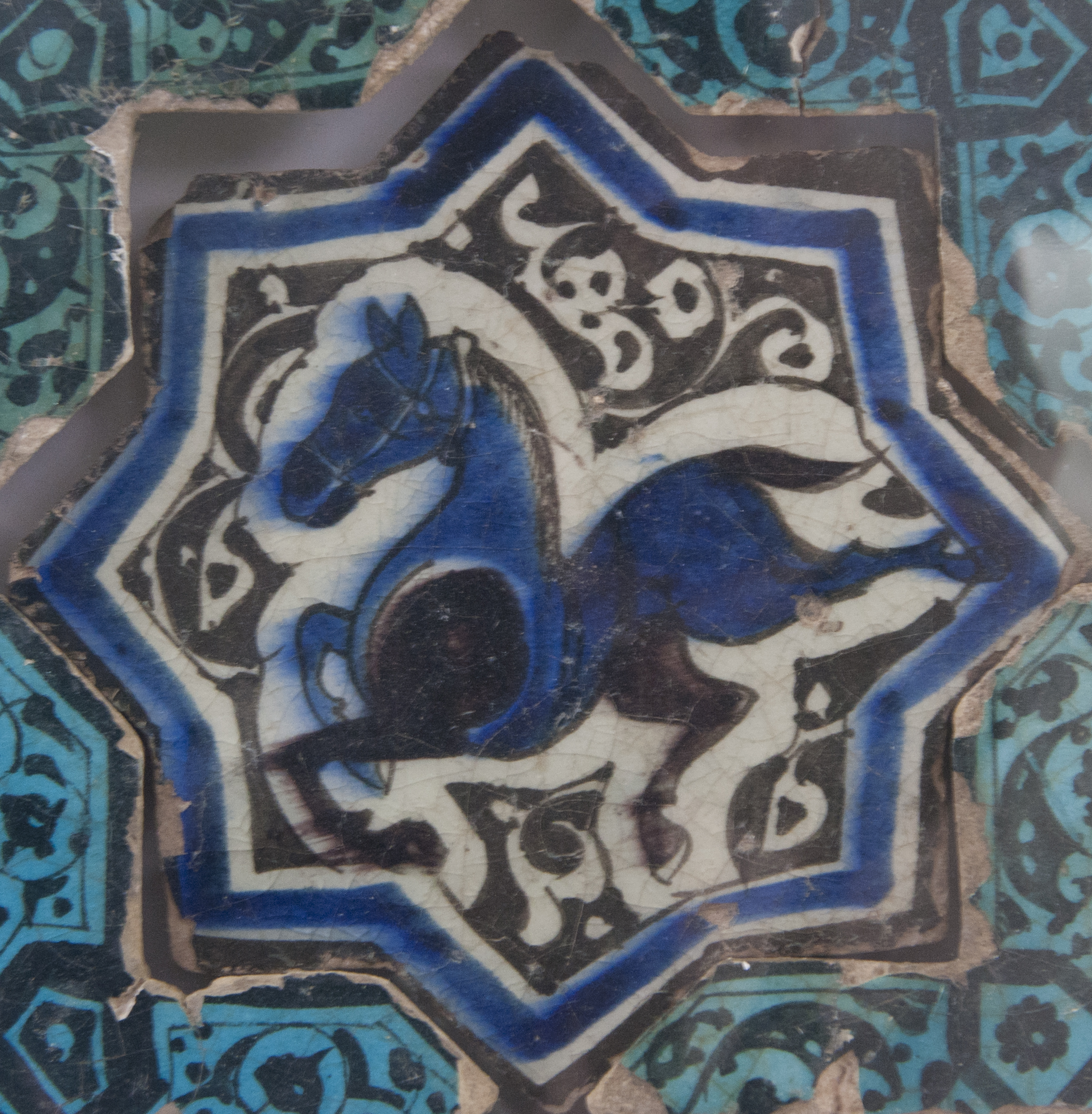

== See also ==
- Alanya Castle
- Artuklu Palace

== Sources ==
- Aslanapa, Oktay (1971). Turkish Art and Architecture. New York: Praeger.
- Redford, Scott (1993). "Thirteenth-century Rum Seljuq palaces and palace imagery" (PDF). Ars Orientalis. 23: 219–236. JSTOR 4629450.
