= Artuklu Palace =

- Interactive map of the Artuklu Palace area

General information
- Type: Palace
- Location: Diyarbakır, Turkey
- Coordinates: 37.91629°N 40.24170°E
- Construction started: early 13th century
- Client: Artuqid rulers
- Owner: Turkish state

The Artuklu Palace or Artukid Palace or Artuqid Palace (Turkish: Artuklu Sarayı) was the seat of the Diyarbakır branch of the Artuqid dynasty, a Turkish Beylik that ruled eastern Anatolia and Al-Jazira in the 12th and 13th centuries. It was located in the İçkale (citadel) of the historic walled district of Diyarbakır. Partially excavated in the 1960s, the main body of the palace is today still buried under a mound.

== History ==
The palace was situated in the present-day İçkale neighborhood, inside the Diyarbakır City Walls. It was built during the reign of Nasir al-Din Mahmud (Turkish: Salih Nasreddin Muhammed) (1200–1222).

There are further Artukid palatial residences in Mardin, Hasankeyf and Palu whose remains stand, but this one in Diyarbakır is usually referred to as the "Palace" of the sons of Artuk. This palace was also where, as his father before him, the groundbreaking Muslim scholar, inventor, and mechanical engineer Al-Jazari had worked for 30 years and was the place, inspiration and context of many of this inventions and devices.

The palace was used as a prison in the beginning of the Ottoman rule (16th century) until it fell into decay and gradually disappeared under the present-day Virantepe mound.

Partial excavations on the palace site were carried out in 1961 under the direction of the art historian and Ottoman archaeologist Oktay Aslanapa. Important ruins found during the excavation, such as part of the palace garden and the clear outlines of the architectural system of hamams, were not conserved and disappeared over time. The vestiges were also externally studied of recent date using computer technologies.

== Description ==
Surrounded by gardens, rich in amenities as well as in decorative and artistic elements (such as statues, with a number of scholars defining a period of less strict observance of ban on human representation in the early centuries of Islam) and also in eccentricities, itself perhaps inspired by a tradition dating back to the Umayyad palace of Khirbat al-Mafjar in Jericho, the palaces of the Artukids provided models for the Mameluks later.

== The door and door knockers ==
Door knockers, often cast in bronze, had a symbolic significance across eastern Anatolia and were part of a thematic program that was prominent in the region especially during the 12th – 13th centuries. The tradition, although evolved, survives to this day in such centers as Kemaliye. Along with the door in its entirety, they were also a distinctive feature of the palace in Diyarbakır.

Door knocker from the Great Mosque of Cizre, similar to the now-lost door knockers at the Artuklu Palace in Diyarbakır.

The door knockers of Artuklu Palace, which united the figures of a double dragon, a lion and a snake, are known, along with the whole structure of the four-meter-high (13 ft) door where they were attached, through the descriptions made by the designer al-Jazari in his manuscript and the drawings within, as well as on the basis of similarities that can be established with the door and the double-dragon figured door-knockers of the Great Mosque of Cizre, built 1155–60 by the Atabegs of Mosul, with Kubadabad Palace tiles and with the dragons in relief in Susuz Han caravanserai near Burdur. The embracing dragons of Cizre Mosque door knockers are on display today in Istanbul's Museum of Turkish and Islamic Arts (Ibrahim Pasha Palace). Another similar knocker, also with dragons, is exhibited in Berlin's Museum of Islamic Art and was, according to early literature, bought in Tbilisi on behalf of Berlin Museums in 1912. However, later publications claim that it originated from south-east Anatolia/North Mesopotamia and smuggled through Tbilisi. The similar dragon figures with the knotted bodies like those on the door-knockers are also seen on some coins of the Artuqids of Hısn Keyfa (Hasankeyf). An imaginative drawing of Artuklu Palace door was made by Michael Meinecke on the basis of Al-Jazari's sketch and the cited similar works.

Al-Jazari's 1206-dated manuscript of "Al-Jami Bain Al-Ilm Wal-Amal Al-Nafi Fi Sinat'at Al-Hiyal" (The Book of Knowledge of Ingenious Mechanical Devices), also includes such other artifacts conceived specially for the Artuklu Palace as clocks, human and animal-shaped toys, automatic jug and pools, water equipment, alarm clock and protractor.

== Sources ==
- Dr. Z. Kenan Bilici. "Bronze door-knockers of Cizre Great Mosque: A New Example". Transoxiana:Journal Libre de Estudios Orientales, Boris Ilich Marshak Festschrift.
- MEINECKE, Michael (1989), "Islamische Drachentüren-Zu Einer Neuer werbung des Museums für Islamische Kunst", Museums Journal 3, IV (1989), pp. 54–58.
- (Book cover) Oktay Aslanapa (1991). Anadolu'da ilk Türk mimarisi: Başlangıcı ve gelişmesi (Early Turkish architecture in Anatolia: Beginnings and development) (in Turkish). AKM Publications, Ankara. ISBN 975-16-0264-5.
- "Citadel, City Walls and Gates of Diyarbakir". ArchNet. Archived from the original on 2006-02-08.
- "Khirbat al Mafjar Umayyad Palace in Jericho". www.islamicarchitecture.org.

== Books ==
- Jane Turner (1996). The dictionary of art. University of Michigan - Grove. ISBN 1-884446-00-0.
- Michael Meinecke (1996). Patterns of Stylistic Changes in Islamic Architecture: Local Traditions Versus Migrating Artists. New York University Press. ISBN 0-8147-5492-9.
