= Sırçalı Medrese =

Madrasa in Konya, Turkey

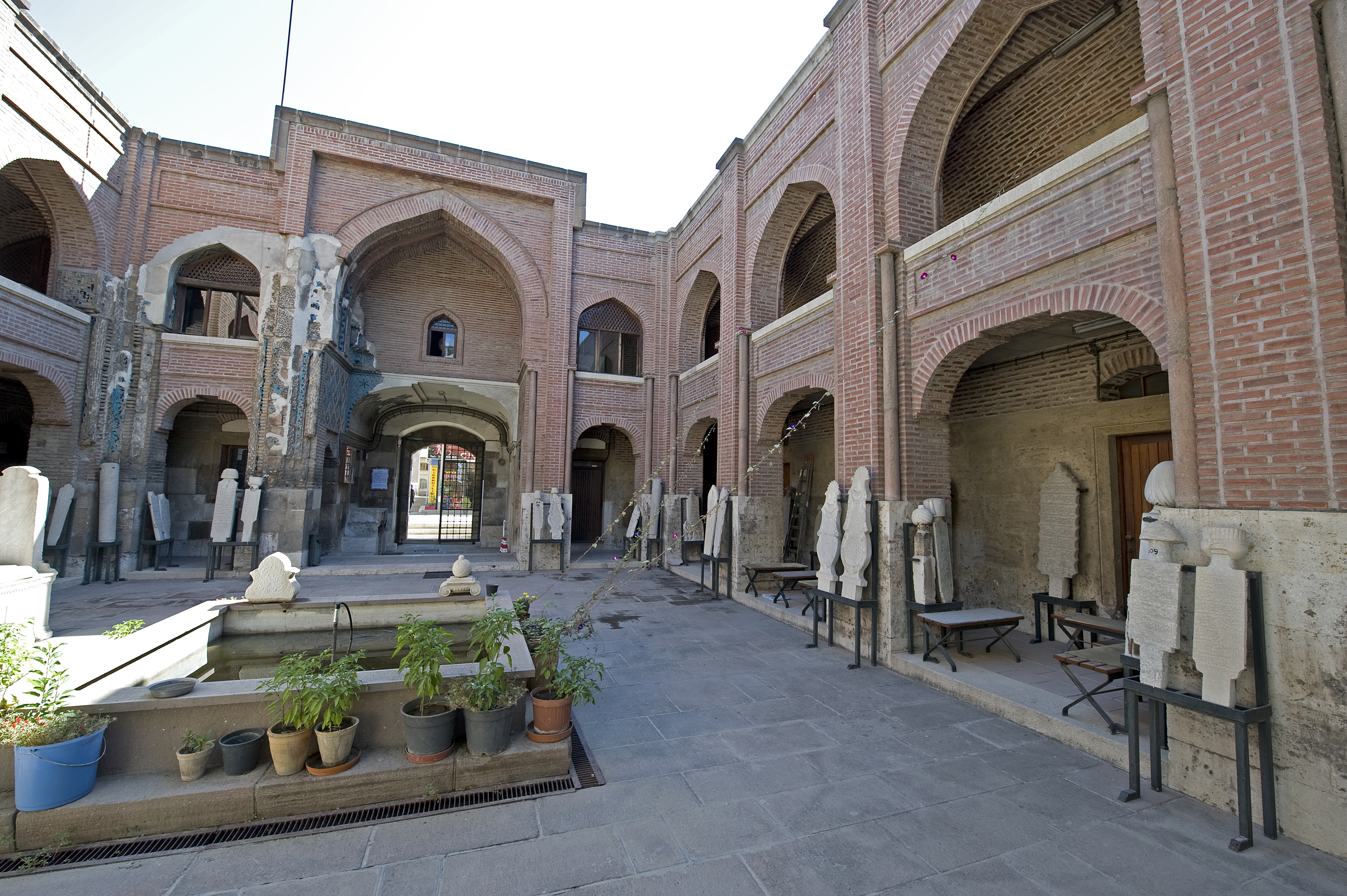

Religion
- Affiliation: Islam
- District: Konya
- Province: Konya
- Region: Central Anatolia

Location
- Location: Konya, Turkey
- Interactive map of Sırçalı Medrese
- Coordinates: 37.870°N 32.494°E

Architecture
- Type: Madrasa
- Style: Seljuk
- Completed: 1242

Sırçalı Medrese (literally Glazed medrese) is a 13th-century medrese (Islamic school) in Konya, Turkey, that served as the capital of the Anatolian Seljuq state. Primary sources indicate that around twenty-four Seljuq Madrasas were built in this city. Seven madrasas still stand in Konya, preserving their architectural heritage.

== History ==
Built in 1242 during the reign of the Seljuk sultan Kaykaus II, by order of Emir Bedrettin Muslih for the study of Fiqh (Islamic doctrines). The interior is decorated with colourful tiles, hence the name of the structure. The building has a highly ornamented stone façade which includes relief work of various geometric patterning. Above the entrance is an inscription in Arabic calligraphy. The building has an open courtyard surrounded by two stories of the student cells and a large Iwan where the lectures took place.

== Location ==
The madrasa is on Sırçalı Street in the Sahib ‘Ata neighborhood, south of Ala’ al-Din.

== Patron ==
In the year 640 AH/ 1243 CE, the patron of Sırçalı madrasa Badr al-Din Muslih, was known by various titles, including lala (mentor), hadim (servant), and hoca (teacher), reflecting his roles in service to the Sultan ‘Ala’ al-Din Keykubad II. In the reign of the Seljuk sultan Kaykaus II. Badr al-Din died after 656AH/1258CE.

=== Entrance inscription ===
The sultanic Badr al-Din Muslih may God extend his prosperity, pining for the grace of his lord, ordered the construction of this blessed madrasa during the rule of the greatest sultan, the shadow of God in the world Ghiyath al-Dunya wa-l-Din, highest of Islam and of the Muslims, the father of conquest Kaykhusraw b. Kayqubad, associate of the prince of believers.

== Madrasa ==
The name Sırçalı Madrasa comes from its magnificent tile work, which is called sirça, Turkish for glazing. Much of the interior of the structure was once covered in tiles. Today, only the western iwan, the tomb ceiling, the arcades' supporting columns, the domed rooms' upper windows, and the main iwan retain tile decorations.

The Sırçalı Madrasa was established for the study of Fiqh (Islamic doctrines), specifically the Hanafi school, as indicated in the remaining part of the foundation inscription found on the portal, reads:

He (the patron) endowed it (the madrasa) for the scholars and students of law among the followers of Abu Hanifa al Nu’man (the founder of Hanafi madhab). May God be pleased with him in the year 640 (1243).

== Layout ==
The Sırçalı madrasa consists of two stories. The plan’s orientation is on the east-west axis with two iwans. A basin is found in the center of this rectangular courtyard. Two pairs of rooms, believed to be for students, are located on each side of the courtyard.

The main iwan is three steps above the courtyard opposite the entrance. As the mihrab's location on its southeast wall proves, it was probably used as a mosque or a prayer hall. The barrel vault that topped it was damaged but has been restored.

The flanking domed rooms were considered winter classrooms, while the iwan was used for the other seasons. Due to Konya’s harsh climate, enclosed rooms were needed during the winter.

== Main entrance ==
As mentioned previously, the main iwan entrance is characterized by the typical orientation of the entrance for Anatolian madrasas, which is on the eastern side. The portal slightly projects from the wall. The arched entrance has a niche on each side, and above it is a marble inscription in thuluth.

== Tomb ==
The tomb is on the northern side of the main entrance, accessible after ascending two steps. It includes three anonymous cenotaphs, one of which may have belonged to the patron Badr al-Din Muslih.

== Material ==
Some original materials were replaced during restoration. Although the madrasa's thick walls are mainly made of rubble masonry stone, wood was used in between for flexibility. Stone was used on the portal, and brick was used in arches and domes for the interior.

== Decoration ==
The building has a highly ornamented stone façade which includes relief work of various geometric patterning.The significance of the Sırçalı madrasa decoration is based mainly on its tile decoration.

The main western iwan’s tilework is original. It uses tile mosaic on a ground of plaster, sometimes called “false tile mosaic.” The colours are light-blue, dark-blue, and manganese, the latter shades from black to dark purple.

The inscription on the right side of the western iwan contains Quran 2:284-6 in thuluth.

To the left of the vault, above a side door, in Kufic script “Glory to God” in Kufic.

Running along the sides of the iwan, beautiful decorations resembling the Banna-i style feature black and blue tiles against a brick background.

On the south wall of the iwan, there is a mihrab with an inscription containing Quran 3:17.

The craftsman’s signature is written in black graffito tile on a medallion on the left side, Muhammad b. Muhammad b. Usman al-banna al-Tusi. Another medallion with a Persian couplet reads My work is unparalleled in the world. I am not eternal, but this work is eternal as a memory

== Restorations and current condition ==
The Sırçalı madrasa continued to function as a madrasa throughout the Seljuq and Ottoman periods until the 17th century, when the iwan vault collapsed. By the 19th century, it had been entirely abandoned as an educational structure. Since then, it has undergone several renovations to resemble its original form closely.

The building now is Konya's Museum of Gravestones. It contains old Roman, Byzantine, Seljuk and Ottoman gravestones.

== Gallery ==
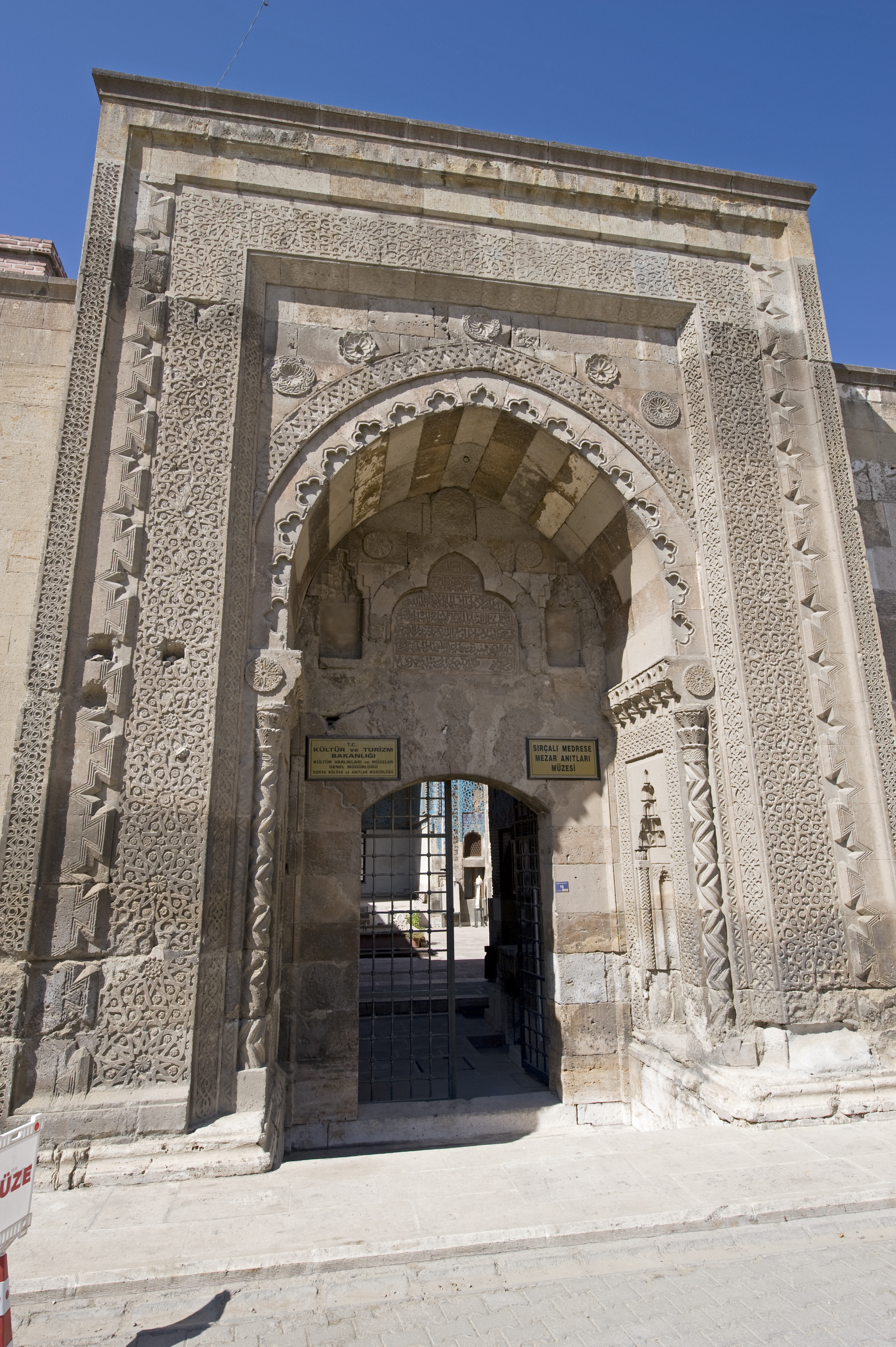
Konya Sırçalı Medrese gravestone museum 4489

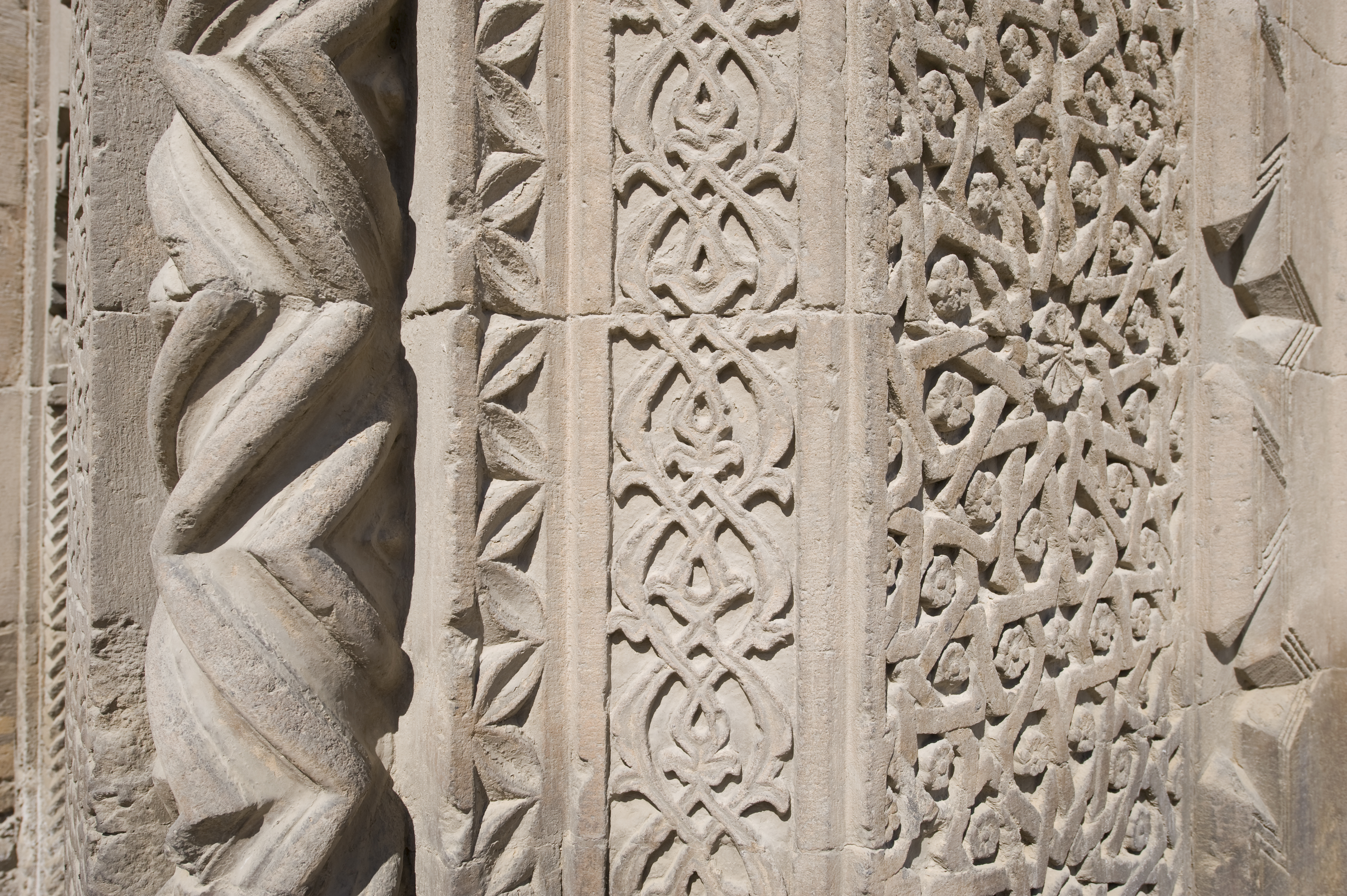
Konya Sırçalı Medrese gravestone museum 4490

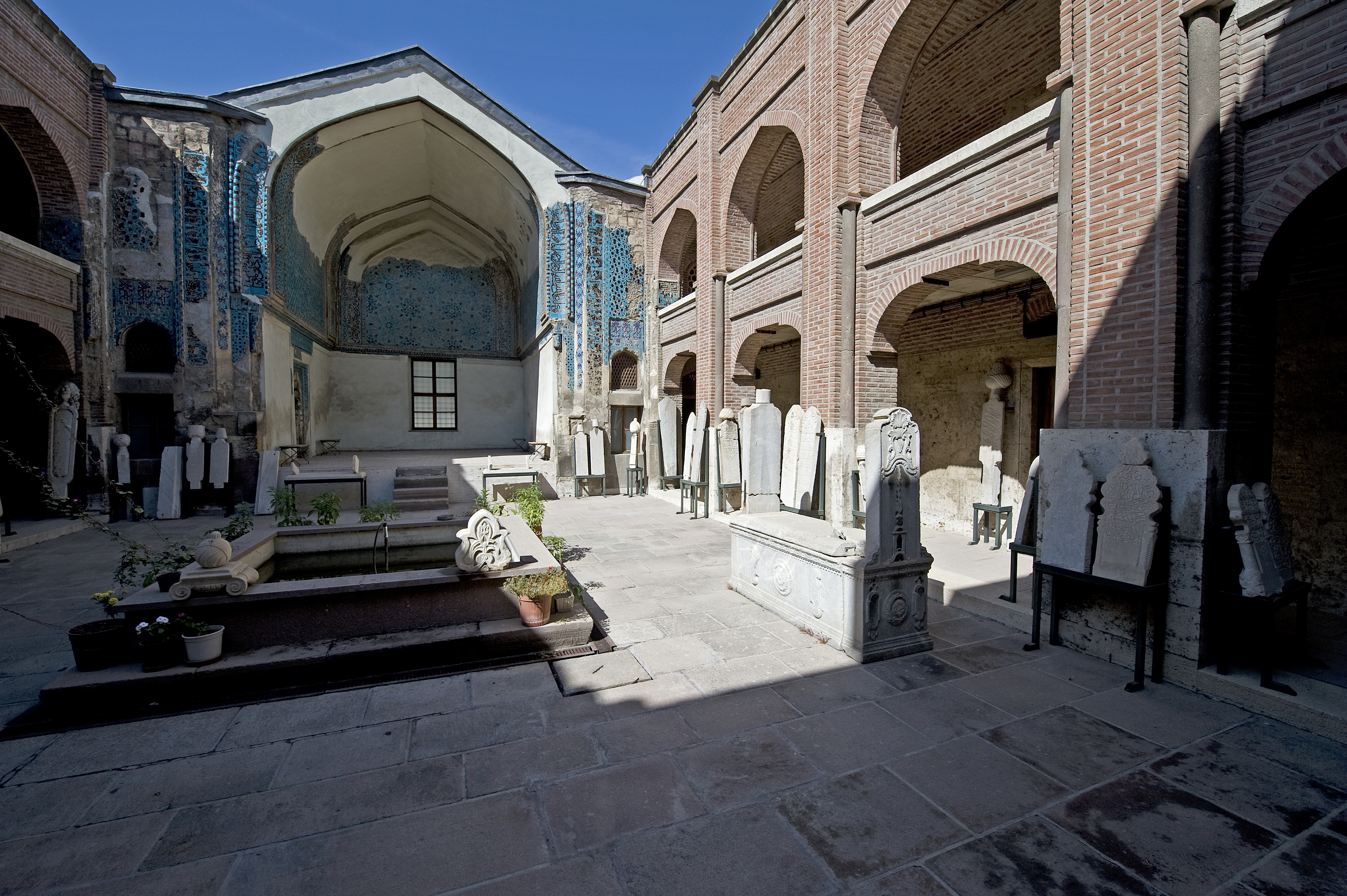
Konya Sırçalı Medrese gravestone museum 4492

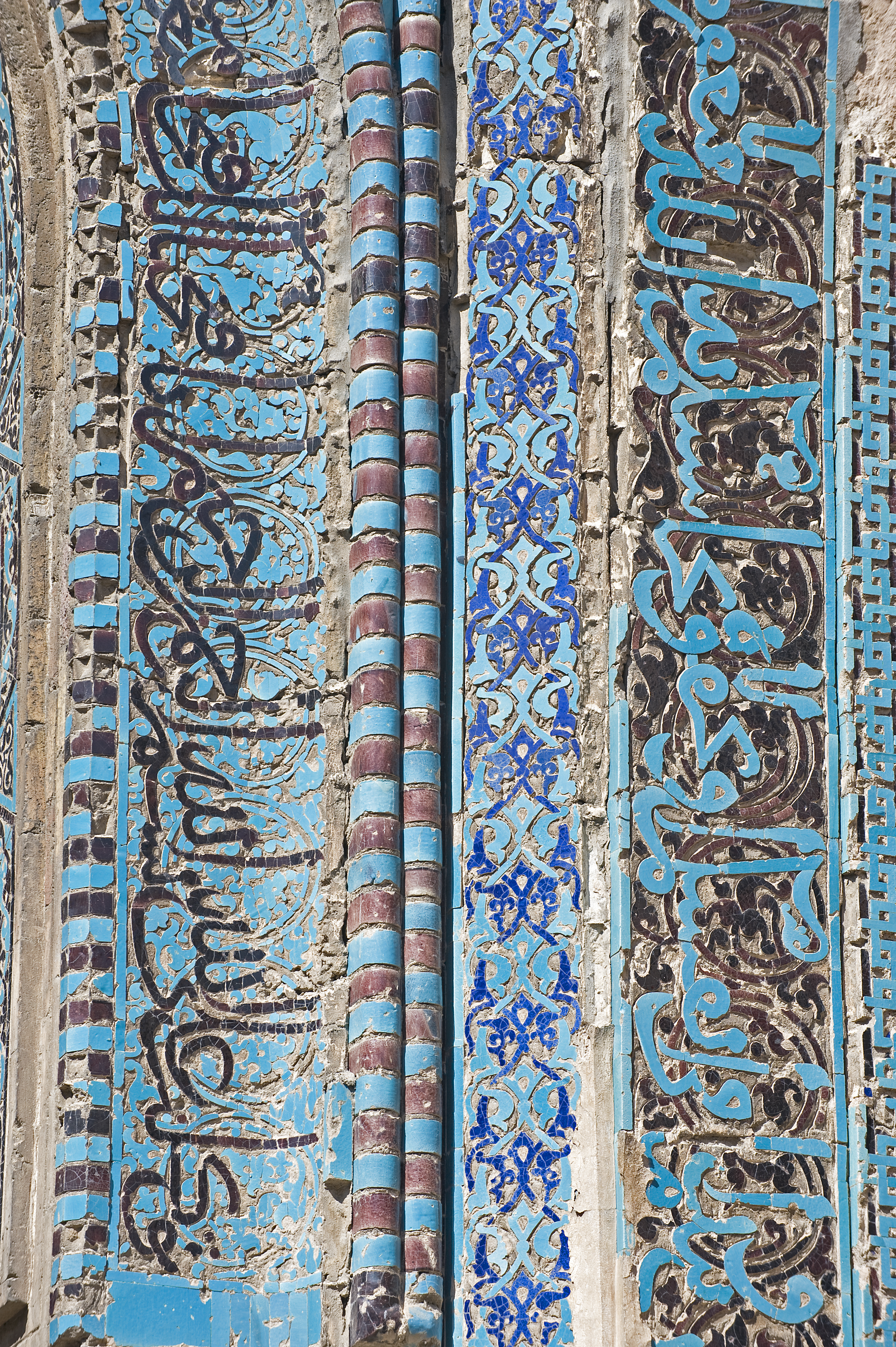
Konya Sırçalı Medrese gravestone museum 4497

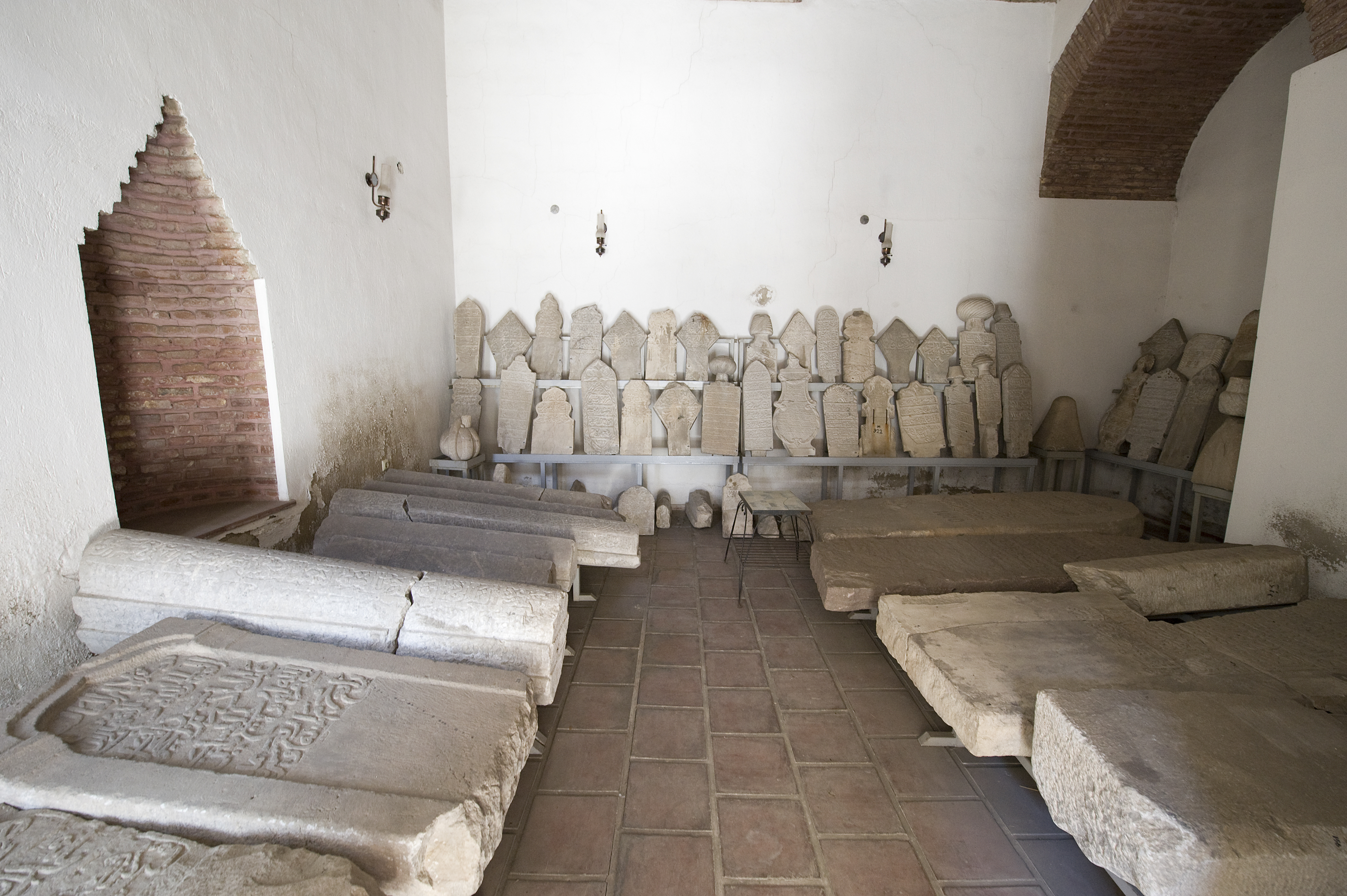
Konya Sırçalı Medrese gravestone museum 4495

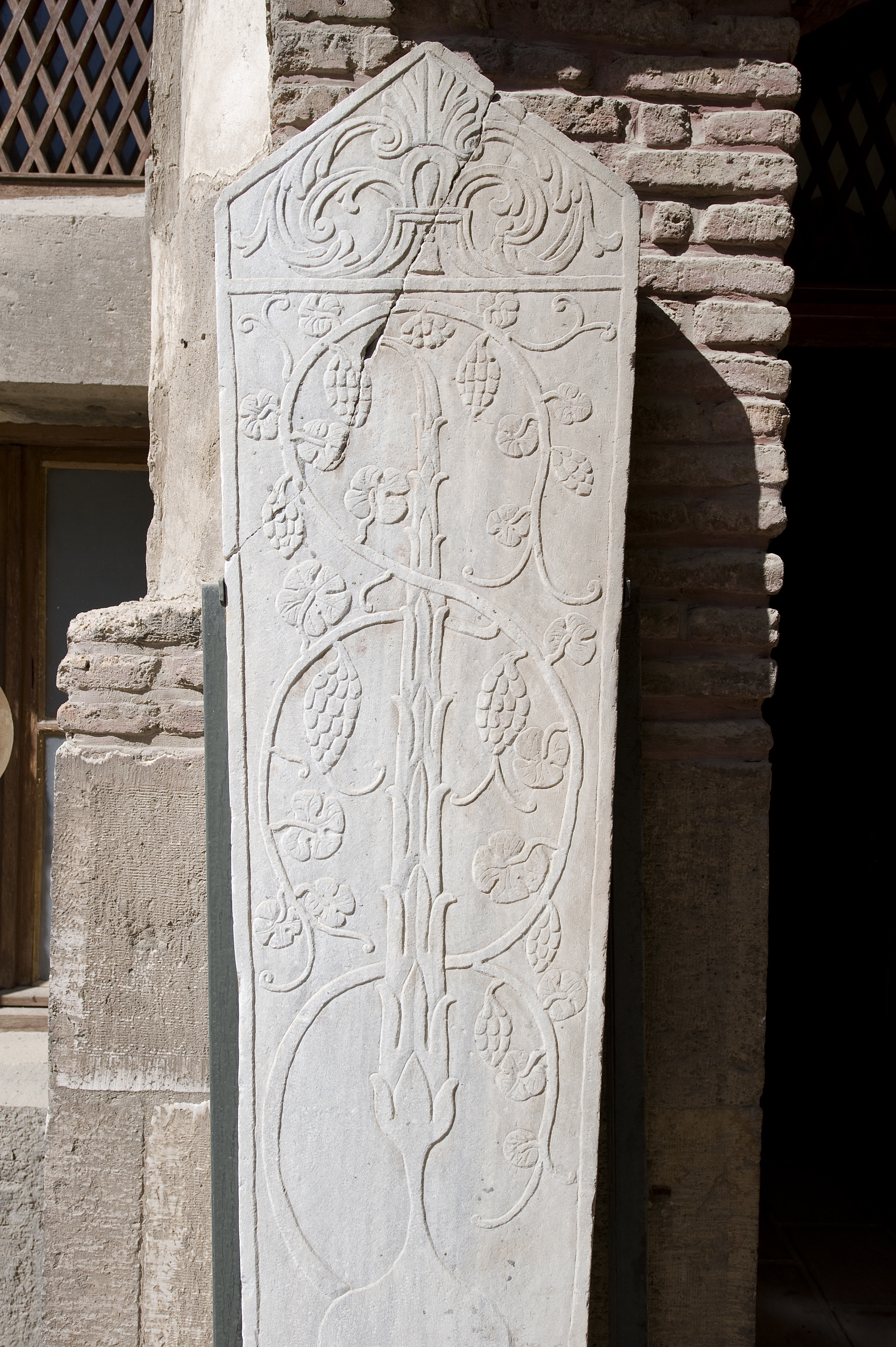
Konya Sırçalı Medrese gravestone museum 4494

== See also ==
- Seljuk eternity sign
