= Manuel Maurozomes =

Byzantine defector (d. c. 1230)

Manuel Komnenos Maurozomes (Greek: Μανουήλ Κομνηνός Μαυροζώμης; died c. 1230) was a Byzantine nobleman who in the aftermath of the Fourth Crusade tried to found an independent principality in Phrygia. His daughter, named Dawlat Raziya Khatun, was married to the Seljuk sultan Kaykhusraw I, and he eventually became governor (emir) of part of the region under Seljuk control; he was an influential figure in the Seljuk court until his death.

== Biography ==
Little is known of Manuel's early life. The Maurozomai, a family possibly of Peloponnesian origin, rose to prominence in the 12th century and belonged to the aristocracy. Manuel has traditionally been identified as a son of Theodore Maurozomes, who served as a general under Emperor Manuel I Komnenos (r. 1143–1180), and while earlier scholars, following Paul Wittek, made him the husband of an illegitimate daughter of the emperor, more recent scholars follow the reconstruction of Konstantinos Varzos, which makes her Manuel Maurozomes' mother, thus explaining his claim to the prestigious Komnenos name.

Around 1200, when the deposed Seljuk sultan Kaykhusraw I (r. 1192–1196, 1205–1211) came to Constantinople, Maurozomes held, according to the Seljuk chronicler Ibn Bibi, the rank of Caesar in the Byzantine court. During his stay in the Byzantine capital, Kaykhusraw was apparently baptized a Christian with Emperor Alexios III Angelos (r. 1195–1203) as his godfather, and married Manuel's daughter; thus Manuel became the ancestor of the Seljuk sultans Kayqubad I (r. 1220–1237) and Kaykhusraw II (r. 1237–1246).

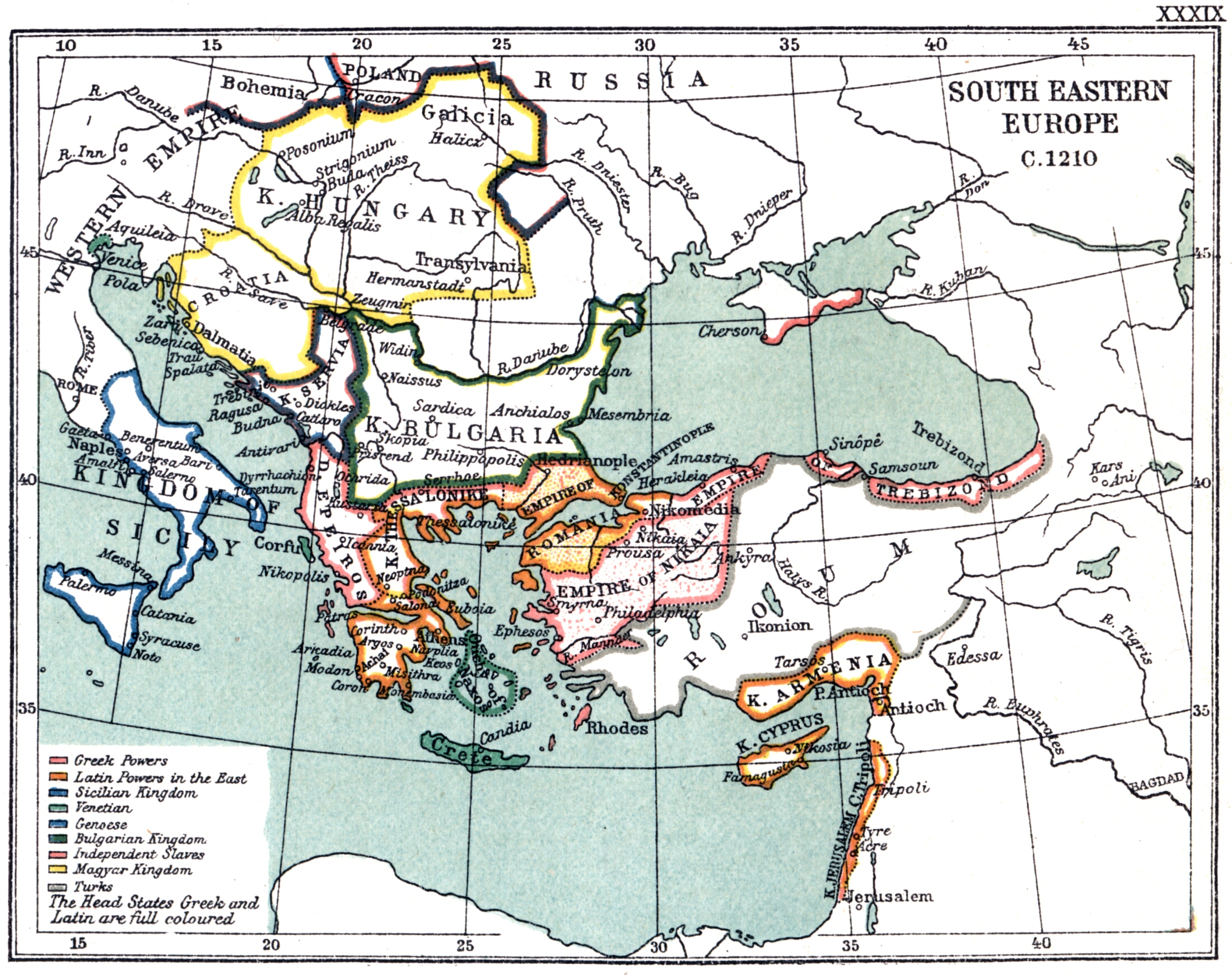
Map of southeastern Europe and Asia Minor, showing the Nicaean Empire and Seljuk Sultanate c. 1210

When Alexios III fled Constantinople at the approach of the Fourth Crusade in 1203, Kaykhusraw too abandoned the city and sought refuge with Manuel in his unidentified "fortress" or "island". Following the capture of Constantinople by the Crusaders and the death of Kaykhusraw's brother Rukn al-Din Suleyman, Kaykhusraw was recalled to Iconium, and Maurozomes accompanied him. They were briefly detained at Nicaea, where the local ruler (Constantine or Theodore I Laskaris) had concluded a treaty with the new Seljuk sultan, Kilij Arslan III (r. 1204–1205), but they managed to escape and eventually restore Kaykhusraw to the sultanate.

With Seljuk backing, Maurozomes tried now to carve out a principality for himself in Phrygia, and tried to expand his control over the rich Meander valley. There he came into conflict with the Nicaeans under Theodore Laskaris, who decisively defeated Maurozomes' Turkish troops in summer 1205. This victory, and his success over another Byzantine rival, David Komnenos, at Nicomedia shortly before that, allowed Laskaris to consolidate his rule over western Asia Minor, and have himself proclaimed Byzantine emperor. However, early in the next year, as Kaykhusraw and Theodore Laskaris concluded a treaty, the Seljuk sultan secured for his father-in-law a sizeable domain in the upper valley of the Meander, including the cities of Chonae and Laodicea.

Maurozomes remained a Seljuk vassal until his death in c. 1230, and played an important role in the affairs of the Seljuk state: he received the rank of emir, helped secure the accession of his grandson Kayqubad I in 1220, and participated in the Seljuk campaigns against the Armenian Kingdom of Cilicia. Claude Cahen identifies Maurozomes with a certain Emir Komnenos, who appears over the following decades as a Christian supporter of Kaykhusraw and Kayqubad. His descendants remained active in the Seljuk court until the end of the 13th century, although they retained their Christian faith: a John Komnenos Maurozomes (probably Manuel's son), his son Isaac-John and his grandson Michael are attested in Michael's funerary inscription, dating to 1297.

== Sources ==
- Brand, Charles M. (1989). "The Turkish Element in Byzantium, Eleventh-Twelfth Centuries". Dumbarton Oaks Papers. 43. Dumbarton Oaks, Trustees for Harvard University: 1–25. doi:10.2307/1291603. JSTOR 1291603.
- Kazhdan, Alexander (1991). "Maurozomes". In Kazhdan, Alexander (ed.). The Oxford Dictionary of Byzantium. Oxford and New York: Oxford University Press. pp. 1319–1320. ISBN 0-19-504652-8.
- Cahen, Claude (2014). Pre-Ottoman Turkey: A General Survey of the Material and Spiritual Culture and History c. 1071-1330. New York: American Council of Learned Societies. ISBN 978-1-59740-456-3.
- Magoulias, Harry J., ed. (1984). O City of Byzantium. Annals of Niketas Choniates. Detroit: Wayne State University Press. ISBN 0-8143-1764-2.
- Varzos, Konstantinos (1984). Η Γενεαλογία των Κομνηνών [The Genealogy of the Komnenoi] (PDF) (in Greek). Vol. A1. Thessaloniki: Centre for Byzantine Studies, University of Thessaloniki.
- Vougiouklaki, Penelope (2003). "Manuel Maurozomes". Encyclopedia of the Hellenic World, Asia Minor. Foundation of the Hellenic World.
