= Tārikh-i Āl-i Saldjūq =

- Language: Persian
- Subject: History of the Seljuk dynasty
- Publication date: c. 1300s

The Tārīkh-i Āl-i Saldjūq ("History of the Seljuk dynasty"), is an anonymous court account of the architectural endeavors of the Seljuk Sultans of Rum. Written in Persian and from a perspective of a courtier, it covers the Sultanate of Rum from the end of the twelfth to the beginning of the fourteenth centuries.

Although the Tārikh-i Āl-i Saldjūq has no formal structure or system, it does contain valuable information concerning the building and architectural patronage throughout the sultanate. Accordingly, it also details how military construction was the responsibility of the Sultan's amirs. The Tarikh goes into more detail, concerning the amirs' discontent, than the writings of the principal Rum Seljuk historian Ibn Bibi.

Construction attributed to Kaykaus I:

- Mosque in Elbistan

Restoration:

- Fortifications of Alanya, Konya and Sivas. At Kayqubad's order, 140 amirs were ordered to build 140 towers around Konya.

Kayqubad I conquered the castle of Kalon Oros(Alanya) from Kir Farid, and ordered his amirs to build a city on that site with wall and towers. After making the same demand of the amirs concerning fortification surrounding Sivas, twenty three conspired to kill Kayqubad. The plot was discovered and Kayqubad executed all twenty-three.

== Translation ==
The Tārikh-i Āl-i Saldjūq was published in 1553 with a translation into Turkish by F.N. Uzluk in 1952.

== Sources ==
- Crane, H. (1993). "Notes on Saldjūq Architectural Patronage in Thirteenth Century Anatolia". Journal of the Economic and Social History of the Orient. 36 (1): 1–57. doi:10.1163/156852093X00010.
