= Siege of Attaleia =

Turkish capture of Antalya in March 1207

- Part of the Byzantine–Seljuk wars
Date	March 1207
Location	Attaleia (modern-day Antalya, Turkey), Asia Minor
Result	Seljuk victory

Belligerents
Empire of Nicaea	Sultanate of Rûm

Commanders and leaders
Aldobrandini	Kaykhusraw I

The siege of Attaleia in March 1207 was the successful Seljuk capture of the city of Attaleia (today Antalya, Turkey), a port in southwestern Asia Minor. The capture of the port gave the Turkomans a path into the Mediterranean, although it would be another century before they made any serious attempts into the sea.

The port had come under the control of a Tuscan adventurer by the name of Aldobrandini, who had been in the service of the Byzantine Empire. When the Seljuks attacked, the inhabitants appealed to the regent of Cyprus, Gautier de Montbeliard, but he was unable to prevent the Seljuks from ravaging the adjacent countryside. Sultan Kaykhusraw I took the city by storm in March 1207, and put his lieutenant Mubariz al-Din Ertokush ibn 'Abd Allah in charge as the governor.
