= List of Seljuk sultans of Rum =

The following is a list of the Seljuk Sultans of Rum, from 1077 to 1307. The sultans of the Seljuk Sultanate of Rûm were descended from Arslan Isra'il, son of the warlord Seljuk. The Seljuk Empire was founded by Chaghri and Tughril, sons of Arslan's brother Mikail ibn Seljuk.

| No. | Coin | Name | Reign | Life details |
|---|---|---|---|---|
| 1 | | Suleiman I | 1077 – 1086 (~9 years) | 1041 – 1086 (aged 45): Son of Qutalmish, a descendant of Seljuk.; Founded the Seljuk Sultanate of Rum in 1077, with its capital at Nicaea.; Killed at the Battle of Ain Salm in 1086. |
| _ | | Abu'l-Qasim (Regent) | 1086 – 1092 (~6 years) | Appointed Seljuk governor of Nicaea by Suleiman in 1084.; Became the de facto ruler of Rum after Suleiman's death in 1086.; Assassinated by Emir Bozan in 1092 on way to Isfahan.; Not a member of the Seljuk dynasty. |
| _ | | Abu'l Hasan Gazi (Regent) | 1092 (<1 year) | Briefly held Rum before the arrival of Kilij Arslan I.; Brother of Abu'l-Qasim.; Not a member of the Seljuk dynasty.; Deposed by Kilij Arslan I. |
| 2 | | Kilij Arslan I | 1092 – 1107 (~15 years) | 1079 – 1107 (aged 27–28): Son of Suleiman ibn Qutalmish.; Deposed Abu'l Hasan Gazi.; Shifted the capital to Konya due to the First Crusade.; Repelled the Crusade of 1101.; Died at the Battle of Khabur River in 1107. |
Interregnum (1107-1110)
| 3 | | Malik Shah | 1110 – 1116 (~6 years) | 1096 – 1116 (aged 19–20): Son of Kilij Arslan I.; Held prisoner in Isfahan until 1110.; Was in constant conflict with his brothers (Rukn-al-Din Mesud, Melik Arapsah and Tugrul Arslan).; Made Rum a Byzantine vassal after the Battle of Philomelion (1116).; Deposed by Rukn-al-Din Mesud. |
| 4 | | Mesud I | 1116 – 1156 (~40 years) | 1095 – 1156 (aged 60–61): Son of Kilij Arslan I.; Made Rum a Danishmendid vassal after deposing Malik Shah.; Became independent after the death of Melik Mehmed Gazi.; Suppressed the rebellions of Melik Arapsah and Tugrul Arslan.; Defended against the Second Crusade.; Died after his campaign in Cilicia. |
| 5 | | Kilij Arslan II | 1156 – 1192 (~36 years) | 1113 – August 1192 (aged 78–79): Son of Mesud I.; Completely dissolved the Danishmendids.; Dealt a decisive blow to Manuel I Komnenos at the Battle of Myriokephalon.; Captured and ransomed Henry I.; Attempted to convert to Christianity.; Was defeated in the Battle of Philomelion (1190).; Was defeated in the Battle of Iconium (1190) and briefly lost Konya.; Engaged in a succession conflict with his son Qutub-al-Din. Died during the Siege of Aksaray in August 1192. |
| _ | | Qutub-al-Din Malikshah (claimant) | 1192 (<1 year) | d. 1197: Son of Kilij Arslan II.; Instigated a failed rebellion against his father in 1189 in Konya.; Seized de facto power in 1190, when his father abandoned Konya.; Declared himself Sultan in 1192 and marched on Kayseri.; Defeated in Konya in 1192 by Kilij Arslan II and deposed. |
| 6 | | Kaykhusraw I | 1192 – 1196 (~4 years) | 1169 – 1211 (aged 41–42): Son of Kilij Arslan II.; Overthrown and exiled by his brother Suleiman II.; Possibly baptized in Constantinopole. |
| 7 | | Suleiman II | 1196 – 1204 (~8 years) | 1158 – 1204 (aged 45–46): Son of Kilij Arslan II; Overthrew Kaykhusraw I.; Conquered Erzurum and gave it to Tughril ibn Kılıç Arslan II.; Defeated by the Georgians at the Battle of Basiani. |
| 8 | | Kilij Arslan III | 1204 – 1205 (~1 year) | 1184 – 1205 (aged 20–21): Son of Suleiman II.; Overthrown by his uncle Kaykhusraw I |
| (6) | | Kaykhusraw I | 1205 – 1211 (~6 years) | 1169 – 1211 (aged 41–42): Returned and deposed Kilij Arslan III.; Seized Antalya in 1207 from the Empire of Nicaea.; Fought wars against Trebizond and Cilicia.; Killed in the Battle of Alaşehir |
| 9 | | Kaykaus I | 1211 – 1220 (~9 years) | 1187 – 1220 (aged 32–33): Son of Kaykhusraw I.; Concluded a peace treaty with emperor Theodore I Laskaris; Besieged and conquered Sinop, capturing Alexios I of Trebizond.; Maintained a dual Christian-Muslim identity.; Built the Şifaiye Medrese in Sivas. |
| 10 | | Kayqubad I | 1220 – 1237 (~17 years) | 1192 – 1237 (aged 44–45): Son of Kaykhusraw I.; Attempted to claim the throne after his father's death.; Occupied Alanya and vassalized Cilician Armenia.; Defeated the Cumans and occupied Sudak.; Expanded into Anatolia by defeating the Ayyubids and the Artuqids.; Brought Trabzon under Seljuk vassalage. |
| 11 | | Kaykhusraw II | 1237 – 1246 (~9 years) | 1215 – 1246 (aged 30–31): Son of Kayqubad I. |
| 12 | | Kaykaus II | 1246 – 1262 (~16 years) | 1234 – 1279 (aged 44–45): Son of Kaykhusraw II.; Co-ruled with Kilij Arslan IV from 1249 to 1254 and 1257 to 1262.; Co-ruled with Kayqubad II from 1249 to 1254.; Fled in 1262 after civil war with Kilij Arslan IV. |
| 13 | | Kayqubad II | 1249 – 1254 (~5 years) | 1238 or 1239 – 1256 (aged 16–18): Son of Kaykhusraw II.; Co-ruled with Kaykaus II and Kilij Arslan IV. |
| 14 | | Kilij Arslan IV | 1249 – 1254 (~5 years) | 1237 or 1240 – 1265 (aged 25 or 28): Son of Kaykhusraw II.; Co-ruled with Kaykaus II and Kayqubad II. |
| (14) | | Kilij Arslan IV | 1257 – 1266 (~9 years) | 1237 or 1240 – 1265 (aged 25 or 28): Second reign.; Co-ruled with Kaykaus II. |
| 15 | | Kaykhusraw III | 1266 – 1284 (~18 years) | Between 1259 and 1263 – 1284 (aged 20–25): Son of Kilij Arslan IV. |
| 16 | | Mesud II | 1284 – 1297 (~13 years) | 1262 – 1307 (aged 44–45): Son of Kaykaus II.; Deposed in 1297. |
| 17 | | Kayqubad III | 1297 – 1302 (~5 years) | d. 1302: Nephew of Mesud II and grandson of Kaykaus II. |
| (16) | | Mesud II | 1303 – 1307 (~4 years) | 1262 – 1307 (aged 44–45): Second reign. |
| 18 | | Mesud III | 1307 – 1308 (~1 year) | d. 1308: Son of Kayqubad III. |
| 19 | | Kilij Arslan V | 1310 – 1318 (~8 years) | Claimant to the throne. |

The Seljuk Sultanate of Rum dissolved into many Anatolian Beyliks, one of them being the future Ottoman Empire in 1307.

== See also ==
- Seljuk dynasty

== Source ==
- Bosworth, Clifford E., The New Islamic Dynasties: A Chronological and Genealogical Manual, Columbia University Press, New York, 1996, pp. 213-214
- Baldwin, Marshall W., and Setton, Kenneth M, A History of the Crusades: Volume One, The First Hundred Years, The University of Wisconsin Press, Madison, 1969, pg. 701 (index list of Selchükids of Rûm through Kilij Arslan II)
- Wolff, Robert L. and Hazard, H. W., A History of the Crusades: Volume Two, The Later Crusades 1187–1311, The University of Wisconsin Press, Madison, 1977, pg. 862 (index list of Selchükids of Rûm after Kilij Arslan II)
- Murray, Alan V. The Crusades—An Encyclopedia, ABC-CLIO, Santa Barbara, 2006, pp. 1050–1052.
