= Kaykhusraw I =

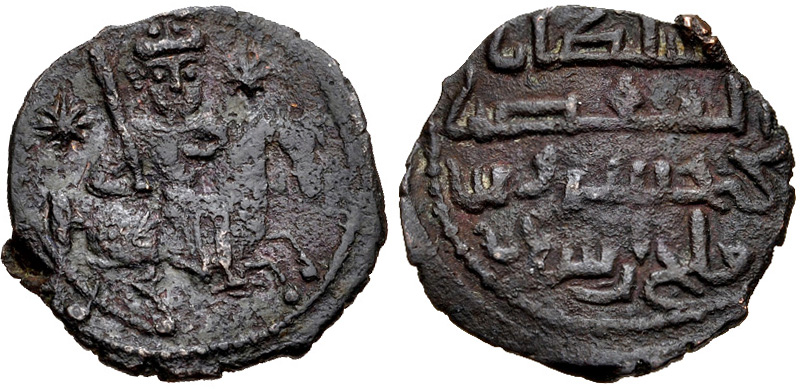
- Ghiyath al-Din Kay Khusraw I bin Qilich Arslan. Second reign, AH 601–608 (AD 1204–1211)

Sultan of Rûm
- Reign: 1192–1196
- Predecessor: Kilij Arslan II
- Successor: Süleymanshah II
- Reign: 1205–1211
- Predecessor: Kilij Arslan III
- Successor: Kaykaus I
- Born: 1169; Kuyucak, Sultanate of Rum
- Died: 1211 (aged 41–42); Kuyucak, Sultanate of Rum
- Burial: Konya, Turkey
- Consort: daughter of Manuel Maurozomes; Barduliya Khatun
- Issue: Kaykaus I Kayqubad I Muzaffar al-Din Numan
Names
- Ghīyāth al-Dīn Kaykhusraw ibn Qilij Arslān
- Dynasty: Seljuk
- Father: Kilij Arslan II
- Mother: Ummuhan Khatun
- Religion: Sunni Islam (Hanafi); Eastern Orthodox Christianity (alleged)

Kaykhusraw I (Old Anatolian Turkish: كَیخُسرو or Ghiyāth ad-Dīn Kaykhusraw ibn Kilij Arslān; Persian: غياث‌الدين كيخسرو بن قلج ارسلان), the eleventh and youngest son of Kilij Arslan II, was Seljuk Sultan of Rûm. He succeeded his father in 1192, but had to fight his brothers for control of the Sultanate, losing to his brother Suleiman II in 1196. He ruled it 1192–1196 and 1205–1211.

== Name ==
The name "Kaykhusraw" is based on the name of the legendary Shahnameh hero Kay Khosrow.

== Background ==
Kaykhusraw's date of birth is unknown. He was the eleventh and youngest son of Kilij Arslan II (r. 1156–1192). His mother was of Byzantine ancestry; Christian Greek women were the dominant origin of the slave-concubines in the Seljuk harem. Kaykhusraw received a good education during his upbringing, learning other languages besides his native Turkish, which was Persian, Arabic, and Greek.

== Marriage ==
Kaykhusraw married a daughter of Manuel Maurozomes. Manuel Maurozomes would hold the castles of Chonae and Laodicea as a vassal of Kaykhusraw.

== Reign ==
In 1192/93, Kaykhusraw returned the Byzantine nobleman, Theodore Mangaphas, to Emperor Isaac II after receiving assurances of Mangaphas' treatment. With his brother, Rukn ad-Din Suleiman Shah, quickly advancing towards Konya, Kaykhusraw fled to Constantinople in 1196. He lived in Constantinople from 1197–1203, possibly even being baptised. A mathnawi written by Kaykhusraw himself compares his destiny during that period to that of the legendary Iranian hero Jam (Jamshid), who had to go into exile after losing his divine fortune (farr).

After Suleiman's death and Kilij Arslan's ascension to the sultanate, Kaykhusraw forced his way into Konya, removed Kilij from power and was enthroned for a second time.

Kaykhusraw seized Antalya in 1207 from its Niceaen garrison which furnished the Seljuk sultanate with a port on the Mediterranean. It was during this year, Kaykhusraw founded a mosque in Antalya.

Kaykhusraw was killed at the Battle of Antioch on the Meander in 1211. His son Kayqubad I, by Manuel Maurozomes' daughter, ruled the Sultanate from 1220 to 1237, and his grandson, Kaykhusraw II, ruled from 1237 to 1246. Kaykhusraw's body was taken to Konya, where it was buried in the ancestral tomb of his family.

== Identity ==
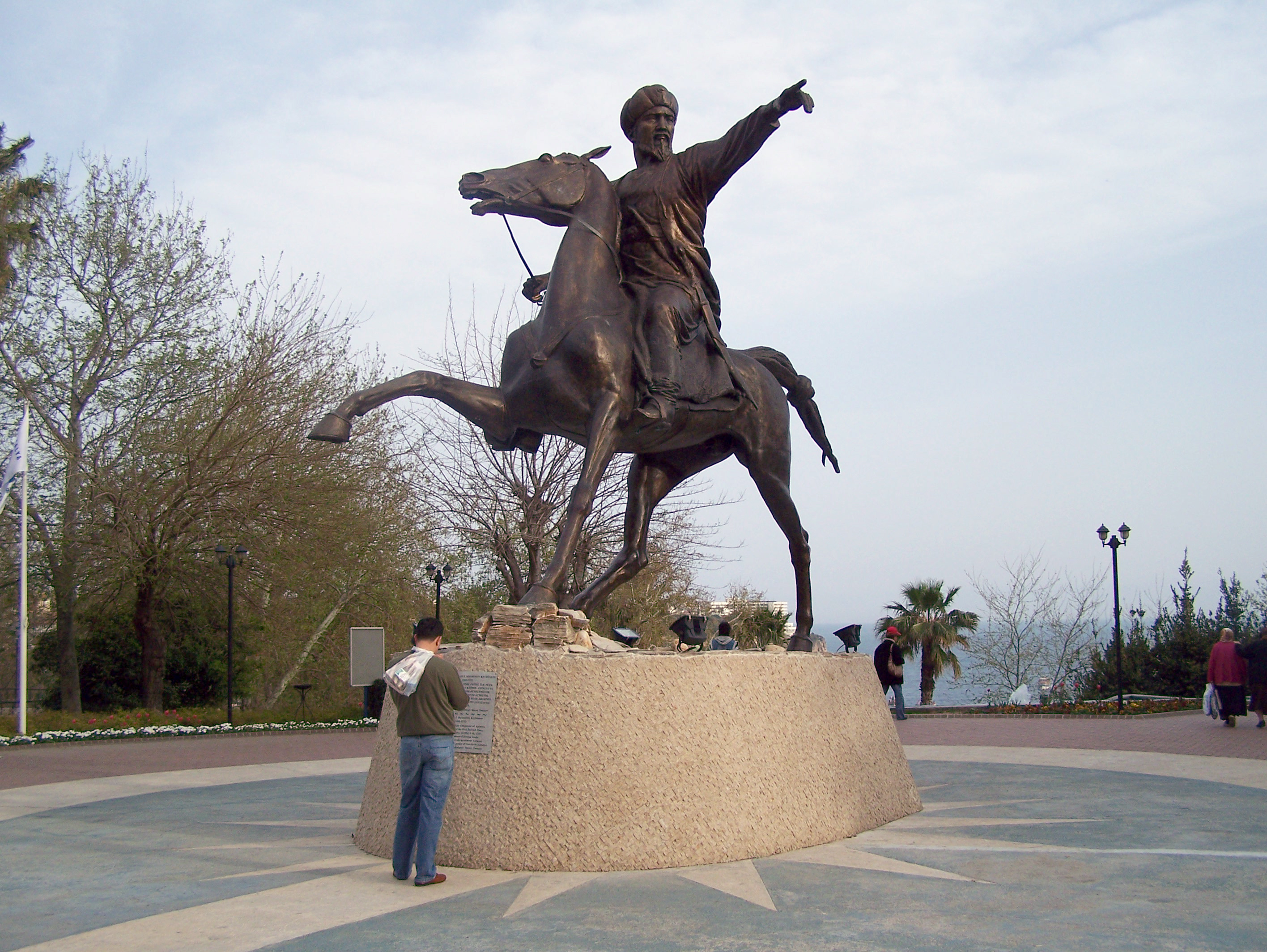
Modern statue of Kaykhusraw I in Antalya, sculpted by Meret Öwezov

According to Rustam Shukurov, Kaykhusraw I "had dual Christian and Muslim identity, an identity which was further complicated by dual Turkic/Persian and Greek ethnic identity".

== Culture ==
Kaykhusraw wrote poetry in Persian. Muhammad ibn Ali Rawandi (died after 1207) dedicated his historical chronicle of the Seljuk Empire, Rahat al-sudur wa-ayat al-surur, to Kaykhusraw.

== Sources ==
- Beihammer, Alexander D. (2011). "Defection across the Border of Islam and Christianity: Apostasy and Cross-Cultural Interaction in Byzantine-Seljuk Relations". Speculum. 86 (3 JULY): 597–651. doi:10.1017/S0038713411001138. S2CID 162690013.
- Bosworth, C.E. (1996). The New Islamic Dynasties. Columbia University Press.
- Brand, Charles M. (1989). "The Turkish Element in Byzantium, Eleventh-Twelfth Centuries". Dumbarton Oaks Papers. 43: 1–25. doi:10.2307/1291603. JSTOR 1291603.
- Cahen, Claude (1997). "Kaykhusraw". In Van Donzel, E.; Lewis, B.; Pellat, CH. (eds.). The Encyclopaedia of Islam. Vol. IV. Brill.
- Crane, H. (1993). "Notes on Saldjūq Architectural Patronage in Thirteenth Century Anatolia". Journal of the Economic and Social History of the Orient. 36 (1): 1–57. doi:10.1163/156852093X00010.
- Durand-Guédy, David (2013). Turko-Mongol Rulers, Cities and City Life. Brill. ISBN 978-90-04-25700-9.
- De Nicola, Bruno; Yıldız, Sara Nur; Peacock, A.C.S., eds. (2015). Islam and Christianity in Medieval Anatolia. Ashgate Publishing Company.
- Özgüdenli, Osman G. (2017). "Gıyaseddin Keyhüsrev I". In Fleet, Kate; Krämer, Gudrun; Matringe, Denis; Nawas, John; Rowson, Everett (eds.). Encyclopaedia of Islam (3rd ed.). Brill Online. ISSN 1873-9830.
- Peacock, A.C.S.; Yildiz, Sara Nur, eds. (2013). The Seljuks of Anatolia: Court and Society in the Medieval Middle East. I.B.Tauris. ISBN 978-0857733467.
- Peacock, A.C.S.; Yildiz, Sara Nur, eds. (2015). The Seljuks of Anatolia: Court and Society in the Medieval Middle East. I.B. Tauris.
- Treadgold, Warren T. (1997). A History of the Byzantine State and Society. Stanford University Press.
- Van Tricht, Filip (2011). The Latin Renovatio of Byzantium: The Empire of Constantinople (1204-1228). Brill.

Preceded by Kilij Arslan II	Sultan of Rûm; 1192–1196	Succeeded by Suleiman II
Preceded by Kilij Arslan III	Sultan of Rûm; 1205–1211	Succeeded by Kaykaus I
