= Constantine Melik =

Seljuk prince and Byzantine governor

Constantine Melik (Greek: Κωνσταντῖνος Μελίκ) (b.1264 - a.1306) was the son of the Sultan of Rûm Kaykaus II. He fled to Constantinople with his father at a young age, stayed there and had an illustrious career as a Byzantine governor.

== Early life ==
Constantine was born in the Sultanate of Rûm, but was forced to flee from his home after his father lost the civil war against his uncle Kilij Arslan IV. Kaykaus took him, his three brothers, sister, mother, aunt, great-grandmother and his two great uncles with him to Constantinople in the summer of 1262, where they were welcomed by Emperor Michael VIII Palaiologos and his court. There Constantine “having been baptized, zealously adhered to the Roman customs”. The sultan's family were sent to reside in Nicaea.

However, tensions soon grew between the former Sultan and Michael VIII in the midst of the Arsenite Schism, and Kaykaus tried to depose him. After the plot was uncovered, Kaykaus fled to Ainos and then to Crimea in the winter of 1264/1265, while the rest of his family were sent to Berroia, with the exception of Constantine, who remained in Constantinople.

== Career in Byzantium ==
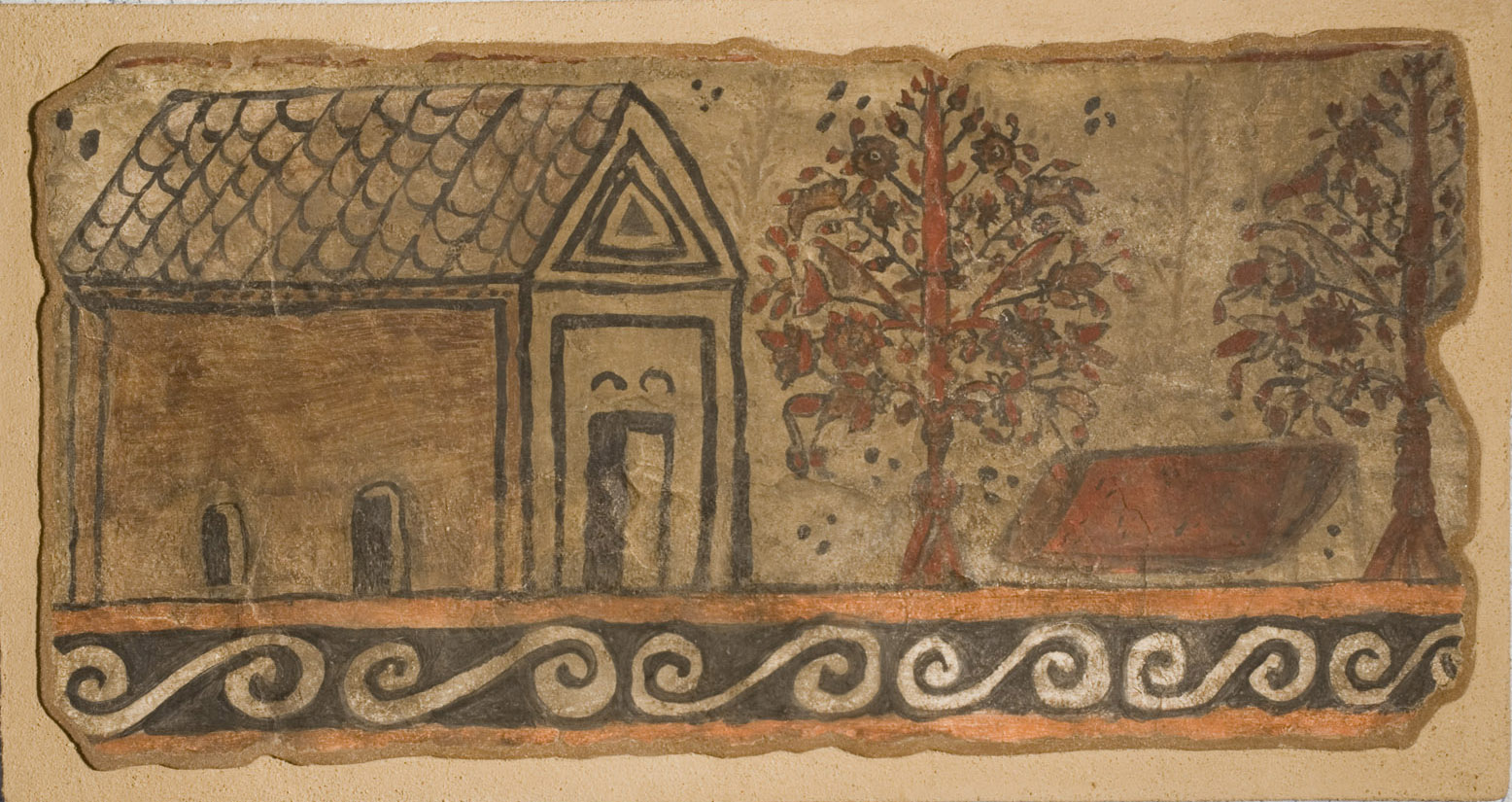
Fresco depicting a ground-floor house and garden, Berroia early 15th century

Constantine became a Byzantine bureaucrat and the governor of Berroia in the 1280s. A few years later Isaac Melik, the leader of the Turkish mercenaries from Anatolia who betrayed the Catalan Company, offered to the new Emperor Andronikos II to proclaim Constantine as the new Sultan of Rûm. However Andronikos instead appointed Constantine the governor of Pegai in 1305/1306. Constantine was sent to Pegai with his niece (the daughter of the Sultan Mesud II), who Andronikos wanted to be married to Isaac Melik, but Isaac was soon executed by the Catalans. At some point, Constantine was promoted and given either the title of Caesar or that of Sebastokrator.

[...] the ancestor’s headgear was decorated with a red stone (λιθάριν κόκκινον), probably a Pamir ruby and, by the emperor’s order, he wore a dark-blue garment (γεραναῖον). [...] precious stones in headgear were an imperial attribute, while blue clothing indicated the dignities of Sebastokrator and Caesar, the top of the Late Byzantine hierarchy of dignities.

== The Melikes Family ==
The Melik (Greek: Μελίκ), Melikai (Greek: Μελίκαι) or Melikes (Greek: Μελίκης) was the noble family established by Constantine. It became related to the Raoul, Asan and Palaiologos families in the 14th and 15th centuries. Probable members of the family and places with lands they owned, include:

• Ioannes Melikes (Greek: 'Ιωάννης Μελίκης) ca. 1320, Serres.

• Astrapyres Melikes (Greek: Ἀστραπύρης Μελίκης), ca. 1340, Berroia.

• Melik (Greek: Μελίκ), ca. 1350, Berroia and Andrianople.

• Rales Melikes (Greek: ῾Ράλης Μελίκης), ca. 1400.

• Manuel Raul Melikes (Greek: Μανουὴλ ῾Ραοὺλ Μελίκης), ca. 1440.

• Mathaios Raul Melikes Asanes Palaiologos (Greek: Ματθαῖος ῾Ραοὺλ Μελίκης Ἀσάνης Παλαιολόγος), 1417-1497, Peloponnesse.

• Manuel Raul Melikes Palaiologos (Greek: Μανουὴλ ῾Ραοὺλ Μελίκης Παλαιολόγος), born 1475 in Nafplio, moved to Neapolis.

== Sources ==
- Shukurov, Rustam (2014). "Sultan 'Izz al-Dīn Kaykāwus II in Byzantium (1262-1264/1265)". Der Doppeladler. Byzanz und die Seldschuken in Anatolien vom späten 11. bis zum 13. Jahrhundert. Verlag des Römisch-Germanischen Zentralmuseums. ISBN 978-3-88467-235-8.
- Shukurov, Rustam (2016). The Byzantine Turks, 1204-1461. BRILL. ISBN 9789004307759.
- de Nicola, Bruno (2017). Women in Mongol Iran: the Khātūns, 1206-1335. Edinb: Edinburgh University Press. ISBN 978-1474415484.
- Peacock, A.C.S.; Yildiz, Sara Nur, eds. (2013). The Seljuks of Anatolia: Court and Society in the Medieval Middle East. I.B.Tauris. ISBN 978-0857733467.
- Trapp, Erich (1986). Prosopographisches Lexikon der Palaiologenzeit. Austrian Academy of Sciences. ISBN 978-3700130031.
