= Kaykaus I =

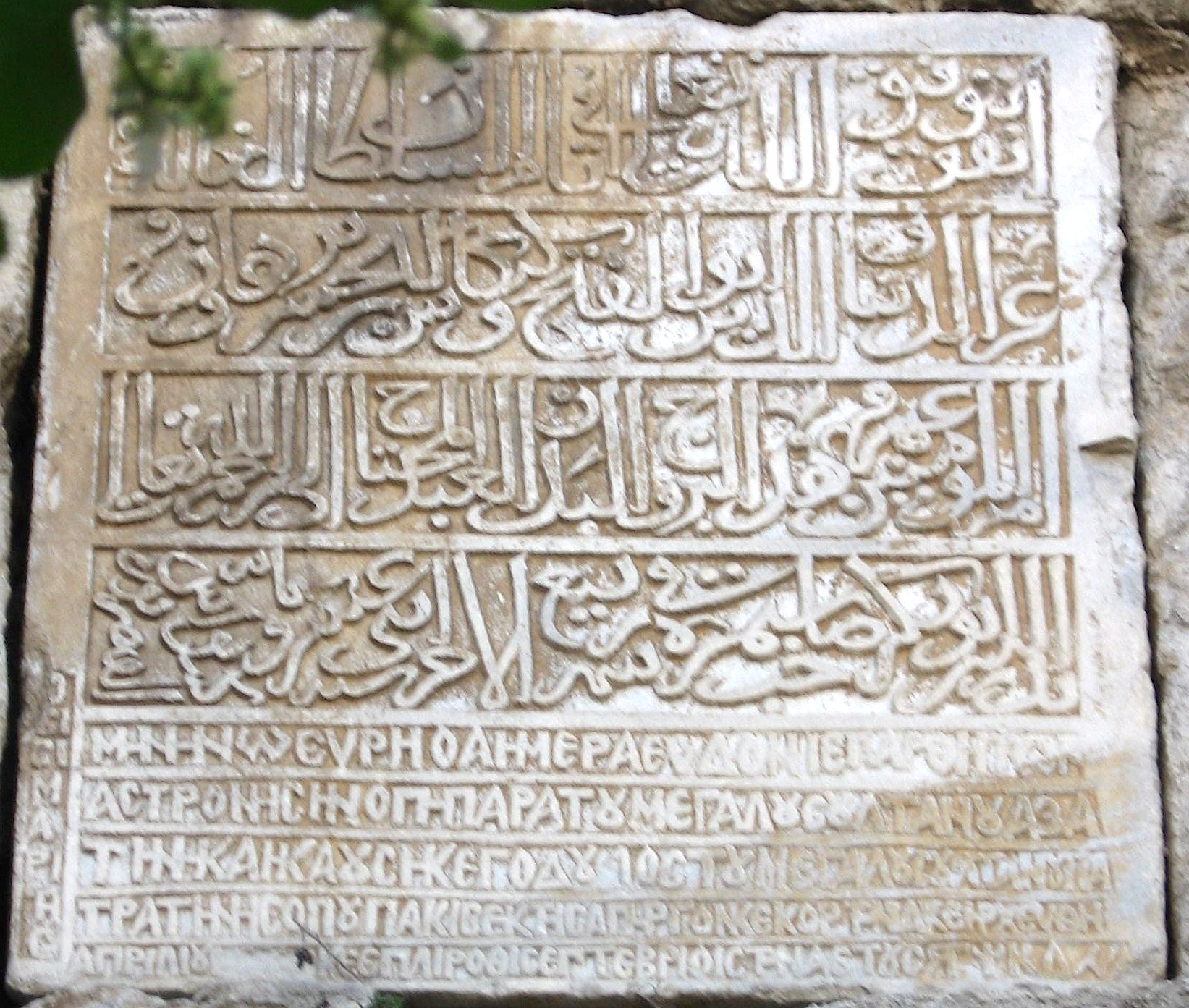
- Bilingual inscription (Turkish and Greek) of Kaykaus I at Sinop

Sultan of Rum
- Reign: 1211–1220
- Predecessor: Kaykhusraw I
- Successor: Kayqubad I
- Born: 1187
- Died: 1220 (aged 32–33)
- Consort: Devlet Raziye Hatun; Selçuk Hatun
Names
- 'Izz al-Dīn Kaykā'ũs pour Kaykhusraw
- Father: Kaykhusraw I
- Mother: Barduliya Khatun

Kaykaus I or Izz ud-Din Kaykaus ibn Kaykhusraw (Old Anatolian Turkish: كَیکاوس, Persian: عز الدين كيكاوس پور كيخسرو ʿIzz ad-Dīn Kaykāwūs pour Kaykhusraw) was the Sultan of Rum from 1211 until his death in 1220. He was the eldest son of Kaykhusraw I.

== Succession ==
Upon the death of Kaykhusraw I at the Battle of Alaşehir in 1211, Kaykaus’ two younger brothers, Kayferidun Ibrahim and the future Kayqubad I, challenged his succession. Kayqubad initially garnered some support among the neighbors of the sultanate, Leo I, the king of Cilician Armenia, and Tughrilshah, his uncle and the independent ruler of Erzurum. At the same time, Kayferidun imperiled the recently acquired port of Antalya by seeking aid from the Cypriot Franks. Most of the emirs, as the powerful landed aristocracy of the sultanate, supported Kaykaus. From his base in Malatya, Kaykaus seized Kayseri and then Konya, inducing Leo to change sides. Kayqubad was forced to flee to the fortress at Ankara, where he sought aid from the Turkman tribes of Kastamonu. Kaykaus soon apprehended both of his brothers and secured the throne for himself.

During this time of considerable danger, Kaykaus negotiated a peace settlement with Theodore Laskaris, the Byzantine Emperor of Nicaea. This treaty marked the end of hostilities between the Seljuq state and the Empire of Nicaea, though Turkmen nomads continued occasionally to trouble the border.

With Antalya secure and the western marches at peace, Kaykaus turned his attentions to the east. First, Cilicia captured Ereğli and Ulukışla, which were captured by the Armenian Kingdom. Then, in the Cilicia Campaign, the Armenians was firmly subjugated. In 1218, Kaykaus allied with Al-Afdal, one of Saladin's sons, who sought to regain his power and offered Kaykaus Aleppo in return.

== Conquest of Sinop ==
Kaykaus’ most significant contribution to the Seljuq state was the acquisition of the Black Sea port of Sinop. In 1214 Turkmen tribesmen captured Alexios, Grand Komnenos of the Empire of Trebizond, on a hunting trip outside of the city. The hostage was turned over to the sultan and negotiated his freedom in exchange for Sinop and the vassalage of Trapezuntine territory to the east. The Seljuqs gained an outlet on the Black Sea to match their Mediterranean port at Antalya, and a wedge was driven between the Empire of Trebizond and the Byzantine Empire of Nicaea. The transfer was affected on Sunday 1 November with both the sultan and the Grand Komnenos present. Alexios was entertained for several days and then politely asked to return to Trebizond.

After the transfer, European and Byzantine trade continued in the city. Kaykaus named an Armenian, Rais Hetoum, to govern the mixed Greek and Turkish population. Churches in the city of Sinop were converted to mosques, on Kaykaus's command. Between April and September 1215 the walls were reconstructed under the supervision of the Greek architect, Sebastos. Fifteen Seljuq emirs contributed to the cost. The work is commemorated by a bilingual Greek and Arabic inscription on a tower near the western gate, and a castle mosque(kale mescidi) was built by 1215.

In 1216, Kaykaus attacked Aleppo in support of his vassal Al-Afdal, an exiled Ayyubid. He was defeated by Al-Ashraf. Kaykaus was working to create an alliance with Badr al-Din Lu'lu', Emir of Mosul, against the Ayyubids, but he died in 1220 and the alliance collapsed.

== Family ==
Consorts

1. Devlet Raziye Hatun–daughter of Muzefferüddin Mahmud, son of the Danishmendid ruler Nizameddin Yağıbasan.
2. Selçuk Hatun–daughter of Fahreddin Behram Shah, the Mengücekid ruler of Erzincan. She was named "Selçuk Hatun" because her mother was a member of the Seljuk dynasty.

== Identity ==
According to Rustam Shukurov, it is very probably that Kaykaus I and his brother Kayqubad I, who both spent considerable time in Constantinople with their father, had the same dual confessional (Christian and Muslim) and dual ethnic (Turkic/Persian and Greek) identity as Kaykhusraw I, Kaykaus II, and Masud II. (Note: .. Ghiyath al-Din Kaykhusraw I, his grandson ‘Izz al-Din Kayka’us II and the latter’s son Mas‘ud II — had dual Christian and Muslim identity, an identity which was further complicated by dual Turkic/Persian and Greek ethnic identity.)

== Monuments ==
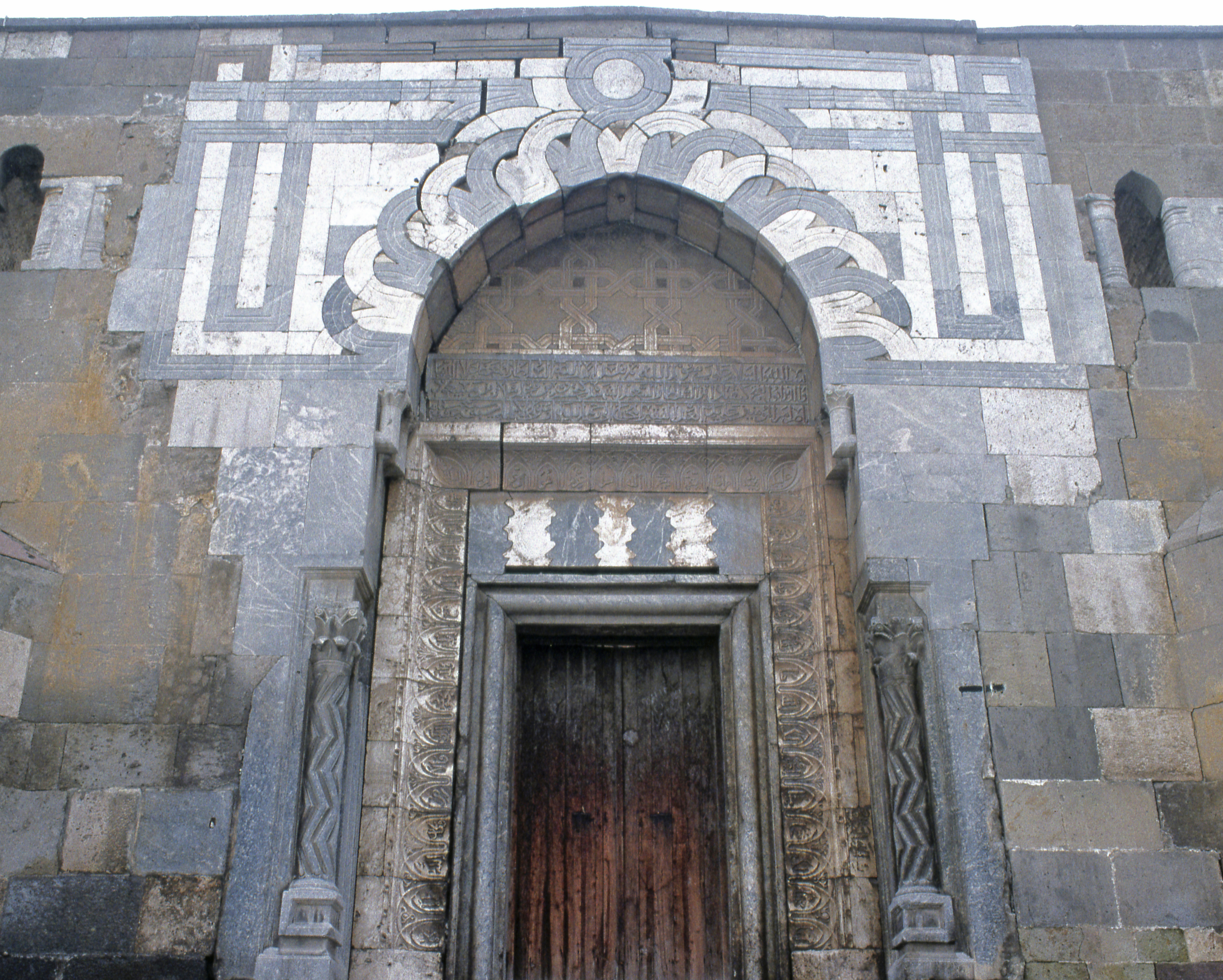
The main entrance of the Alaeddin Mosque in Konya was created by Kaykaus I

In 1212 Kaykaus built a madrasa in Ankara and in 1217 the Şifaiye Medresesi in Sivas. The latter was designed as a hospital and medical school. The sultan's mausoleum is in the south eyvan of the building under a conical dome. The façade includes a poem by the sultan in blue faience tiles.

== Sources ==
- Bryer, Anthony; Winfield, David (1985). The Byzantine Monuments and Topography of the Pontos. Vol. 1. Dumbarton Oaks.
- Cahen, Claude (1968). Pre-Ottoman Turkey: A general survey of the material and spiritual culture and history c. 1071-1330. New York: Taplinger. pp. 120–121. hdl:2027/heb.00871. ISBN 1-59740-456-X.
- Cahen, Claude (1997). "Kayka'us I". In Van Donzel, E.; Lewis, B.; Pellat, CH. (eds.). The Encyclopaedia of Islam. E.J. Brill.
- Crane, H. (1993). "Notes on Saldjūq Architectural Patronage in Thirteenth Century Anatolia". Journal of the Economic and Social History of the Orient. 36 (1): 1–57. doi:10.1163/156852093X00010.
- Peacock, A.C.S.; Yildiz, Sara Nur, eds. (2013). The Seljuks of Anatolia: Court and Society in the Medieval Middle East. I.B.Tauris. ISBN 978-0857733467.
- Redford, Scott (1991). "The Alaeddin Mosque in Konya Reconsidered". Artibus Asiae. 51 (1/2). Zürich: Artibus Asiae Publishers: 54–74 [70]. doi:10.2307/3249676. ISSN 0004-3648. JSTOR 3249676.

Preceded by Kaykhusraw I	Sultan of Rûm; 1211–1220	Succeeded by Kayqubad I
