= Sultanate of Rum =

Turkish state in central Anatolia from 1077 to 1308

Seljuq Sultanate of Rum Anadolu Selçuklu Devleti (Turkish) سلجوقیان روم (Persian) Saljūqiyān-i Rūm
- 1077–1308
- Double-headed eagle used by the Rum Seljuks Lion and Sun adopted by Kaykhusraw II

- Expansion of the Sultanate, c. 1100–1240 Sultanate of Rum in 1100 Conquered from the Danishmendids up to 1174 Conquered from the Byzantines up to 1182 Other conquests until 1243
- Status: Seljuk vassal (1078–1092); Independent sultanate (1077–1078) (1092–1243); Mongol vassal (1243–1256); Ilkhanid vassal (1256–1308)
- Capital: Nicaea (İznik); (1077–1097); Iconium (Konya); (1097–1308); Sebastia (Sivas); (1211–1220)
- Common languages: Persian (official, literature) (Note: "...the Seljuk court at Konya adopted Persian as its official language.") (Note: "The literature of Seljuk Anatolia was almost entirely in Persian..."); Arabic (numismatics, religious, scientific, and philosophical writing); Byzantine Greek (Note: "The official use of the Greek language by the Seljuk chancery is well known".); Old Anatolian Turkish
- Religion: Sunni Islam (official), Greek Orthodox (majority of population)
- Government: Hereditary monarchy; Triarchy (1249–1254); Diarchy (1257–1262)
- Sultan
  - 1077–1086: Suleiman ibn Qutalmish (first)
  - 1092-1107: Kilij Arslan I
  - 1116–1156: Mesud I
  - 1156–1192: Kilij Arslan II
  - 1192-96 / 1205–11: Kaykhusraw I
  - 1220–1237: Kayqubad I
  - 1303–1308: Mesud II (last)
- History
  - Battle of Manzikert: 1071
  - Division from the Seljuk Empire: 1077
  - Battle of Ain Salm: 1086
  - First Crusade: 1096-99
  - Battle of Khabur River: 1107
  - Second Crusade: 1147-1150
  - Battle of Myriokephalon: 1176
  - Third Crusade: 1189–1192
  - Battle of Alaşehir: 1211
  - Siege of Sinope: 1214
  - Kaykubad's Campaigns: 1220-37
  - Battle of Köse Dağ: 1243
  - Karamanid conquest: 1308
Preceded by
| Byzantine Empire |
| Seljuk Empire |
| Danishmends |
| Mengujekids |
| Saltukids |
| Artuqids |
Succeeded by
| Anatolian beyliks |
| Ilkhanate |
- Today part of: Turkey; Ukraine

The Sultanate of Rum, or Seljuk Sultanate of Rum, (Note: Also referred to as the Anatolian Seljuk Sultanate (Persian: سلجوقیان روم, romanized: Saljûqiyân-i Rûm, lit. 'Seljuks of Rûm'), the Sultanate of Iconium, the Anatolian Seljuk State (Turkish: Anadolu Selçuklu Devleti), the Seljuks of Turkey (Türkiye Selçukluları), or the Konya Sultanate (Note: "..the Seljuk Empire of Rum, which later rose to dominate most of Turkoman Anatolia. While Anatolia was gradually transformed into a Turkish dominion, the Great Seljuk Empire, now centered at Isfahan, reached its peak.)) was a culturally Turco-Persian, Sunni Muslim state established over conquered Byzantine territories and peoples (Rum) of Anatolia by the Seljuk Turks following their entry into Anatolia after the Battle of Manzikert in 1071. The Sultanate of Rum is considered to be the beginning of Turkish history in Anatolia.

The Sultanate of Rum seceded from the Seljuk Empire under Suleiman ibn Qutalmish in 1077. It had its capital first at Nicaea and then at Iconium. It reached the height of its power during the late 12th and early 13th century, when it succeeded in taking key Byzantine ports on the Mediterranean and Black Sea coasts. In the east, the sultanate reached Lake Van. Trade through Anatolia from Iran and Central Asia was developed by a system of caravanserai. Especially strong trade ties with the Genoese formed during this period. The increased wealth allowed the sultanate to absorb other Turkish states that had been established following the conquest of Byzantine Anatolia: Danishmendids, Mengujekids, Saltukids, and Artuqids.

The Seljuk sultans bore the brunt of the Crusades and eventually succumbed to the Mongol invasion at the 1243 Battle of Köse Dağ. For the remainder of the 13th century, the Seljuks acted as vassals of the Ilkhanate. Their power disintegrated during the second half of the 13th century. The last of the Seljuk vassal sultans of the Ilkhanate, Mesud II, was murdered in 1308. The dissolution of the Seljuk state left behind many small Anatolian beyliks (Turkish principalities), among them the Ottoman dynasty which eventually conquered the rest and reunited Anatolia to become the Ottoman Empire.

== Name ==
The name Rum was a synonym for the medieval Roman Empire and its peoples, as it remains in modern Turkish. (Note: "This state too bore the name of Rûm, if not officially, then at least in everyday usage, and its princes appear in the Eastern chronicles under the name Seljuks of Rûm (Ar.: Salâjika ar-Rûm)) (Note: "The Seljuqs called the lands of their sultanate Rûm because it had been established on territory long considered 'Roman', i.e. Byzantine, by Muslim armies.") The name is derived from the Aramaic (romī) and Parthian (frwm) names for ancient Rome, which had reached these languages via the Greek Ῥωμαῖοι (Romaioi). The Seljuk Turks used the name to refer to Anatolia.

== History ==
=== Establishment ===
Since the 1030s, migratory Turkish groups in search of pastureland had penetrated Byzantine borders into Anatolia. In the 1070s, after the Battle of Manzikert, the Seljuk commander Suleiman ibn Qutulmish, a distant cousin of Alp Arslan and a former contender for the throne of the Seljuk Empire, came to power in western Anatolia. Between 1075 and 1081, he gained control of the Byzantine cities of Nicaea and briefly also Nicomedia. Around two years later, he established a Sultanate that, while nominally still a Byzantine vassal state, became increasingly independent after six to ten years. (Note: "Although the independent Seljuk sultanate of Rum established by Suleiman (1077–1086) remained nominally under Byzantine suzerainty, it was already clearly lost to Byzantium as a practical matter (...) The Seljukid leaders were only too pleased to see the undisciplined bands of Oghuz warriors carry on their raiding and pillaging as far as possible from Persia proper, and Anatolia was sufficiently large and remote to fully absorb their destructive energies. (...) Anatolia became Turkified, whereas the center of the Seljuk Empire retained its primarily Persian character, language, and culture, although strong Turkic elements took root in Azerbaijan and Khorasan.") (Note: By June 1081, Sulayman had felt himself strong enough to shake off the weak Byzantine suzerainty. Thus the Seljuk sultanate of Rum, which was not recognised by Malikshah until 1084 (and only as a subordinate state), for the first six to ten years of its existence was a Byzantine ‘client’ state.) The Sultanate was officially recognized as a vassal state by the Seljuk ruler Malikshah in 1084, but as late as 1085, Suleiman was tasked by Byzantine emperor Alexios I Komnenos to reconquer Antioch and the former travelled there on a secret route, presumably guided by the Byzantines.

Suleiman tried unsuccessfully to conquer Aleppo in 1086 and died in the Battle of Ain Salm, either fighting his enemies or by suicide. In the aftermath, Suleiman's son Kilij Arslan I was imprisoned and a general of his, Abu'l-Qasim, took power in Nicaea. Following the death of sultan Malik Shah in 1092, Kilij Arslan was released and established himself in his father's territories between 1092 and 1094, possibly with the approval of Malik Shah's son and successor Berkyaruq.

=== Crusades ===
Kilij Arslan, although victorious against the People's Crusade of 1096, was defeated by princely soldiers of the First Crusade and driven back into south-central Anatolia, where he set up his state with its capital in Konya. He defeated three Crusade contingents in the Crusade of 1101. In 1107, he ventured east and captured Mosul but died the same year fighting Malik Shah's son, Mehmed Tapar. He was the first Muslim commander against the crusades.

Meanwhile, another Rum Seljuk, Malik Shah (not to be confused with the Seljuk sultan of the same name), captured Konya. In 1116 Kilij Arslan's son, Mesud I, took the city with the help of the Danishmends. Upon Mesud's death in 1156, the sultanate controlled nearly all of central Anatolia.

The Second Crusade was announced by Pope Eugene III and was the first of the crusades to be led by European kings, namely Louis VII of France and Conrad III of Germany, with help from other European nobles. The armies of the two kings marched separately across Europe. After crossing Byzantine territory into Anatolia, both armies were separately defeated by the Seljuk Turks. The main Western Christian source, Odo of Deuil, and Syriac Christian sources claim that Byzantine Emperor Manuel I Komnenos secretly hindered the Crusaders' progress, particularly in Anatolia, where he is alleged to have deliberately ordered Turks to attack them. However, this alleged sabotage was likely fabricated by Odo, who saw the empire as an obstacle, and moreover Emperor Manuel had no political reason to do so. Louis and Conrad and the remnants of their armies reached Jerusalem and participated in 1148 in an ill-advised attack on Damascus, which ended in their retreat. In the end, the crusade in the east was a victory for the Muslims.

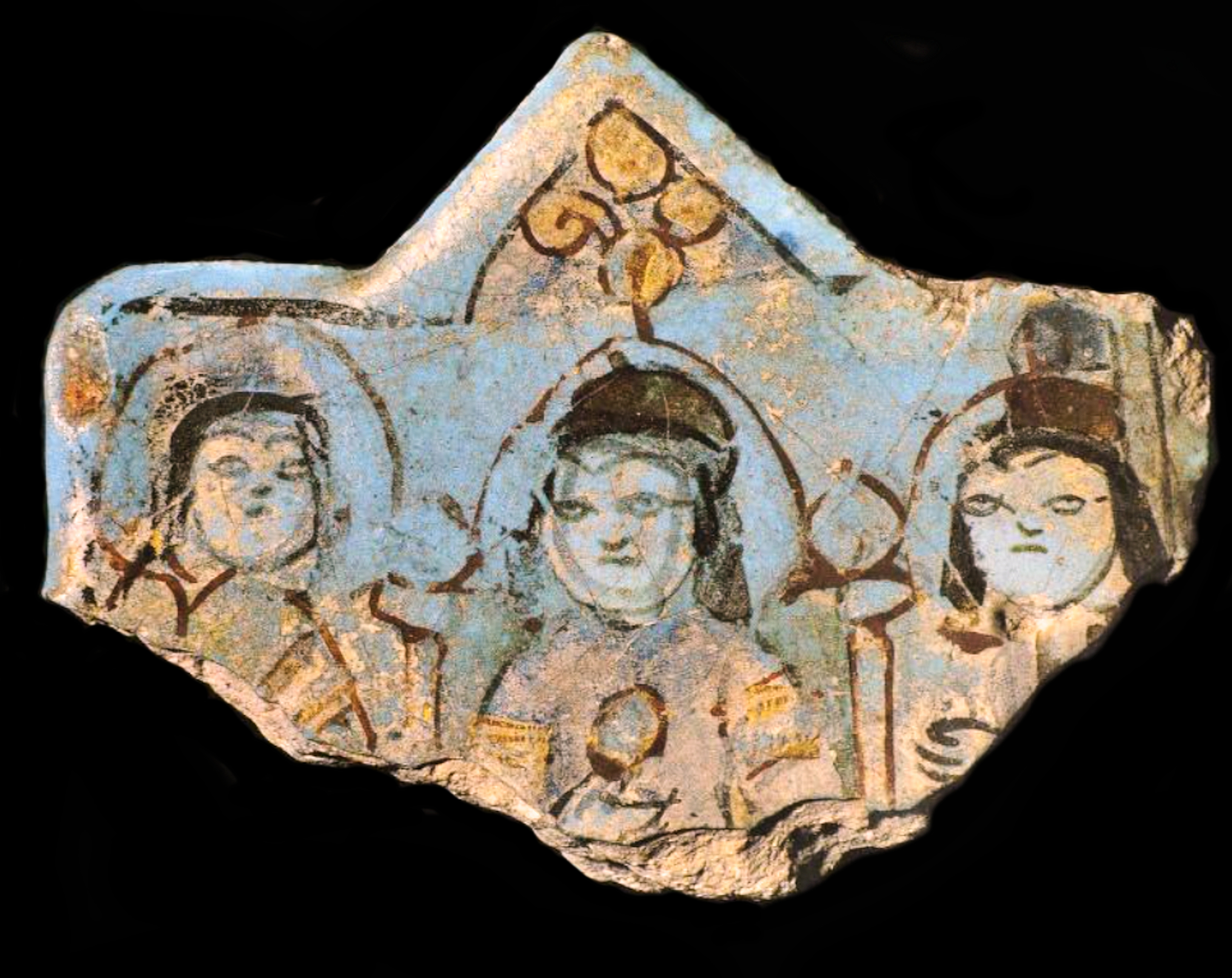
Sultan Kilij Arslan II enthroned, Alaeddin Palace, Konya, 1156–1192.

Mesud's son, Kilij Arslan II, is the first known Seljuk ruler who is known to have used the title of sultan and captured the remaining territories around Sivas and Malatya from the last of the Danishmends. At the Battle of Myriokephalon in 1176, Kilij Arslan II defeated a Byzantine army led by Manuel I Komnenos. Despite a temporary occupation of Konya in 1190 by the Holy Roman Empire's forces of the Third Crusade, the sultanate was quick to recover and consolidate its power. During the last years of Kilij Arslan II's reign, the sultanate experienced a civil war with Kaykhusraw I fighting to retain control and losing to his brother Suleiman II in 1196.

Following Kilij Arslan II's death, the sultanate was divided amongst his sons. Elbistan was given to Tughril ibn Kılıç Arslan II, but when Erzurum was taken from the Saltukids at the start of the 13th century, he was installed there. Tughril governed Erzurum from 1192 to 1221. During 1211–1212, he broke free from the Seljuk state. In 1230, Jahan Shah bin Tughril who was allied to the Khwarazmshah Jalal al-Din, lost the Battle of Yassıçemen, allowing for Erzurum to be annexed by the Seljuk sultanate.

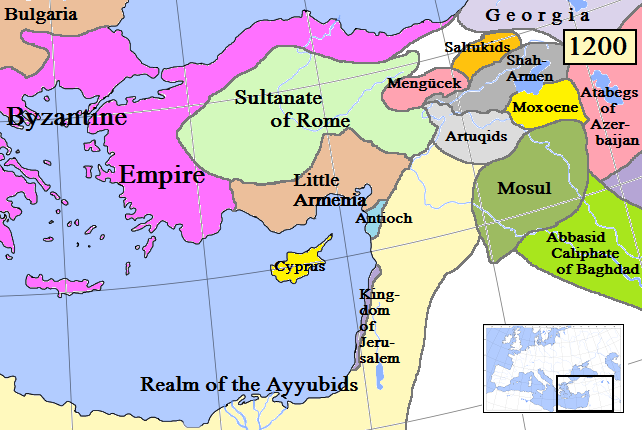
The Sultanate of Rûm and surrounding states, c. 1200

Suleiman II rallied his vassal emirs and marched against Georgia, with an army of 150,000–400,000 and encamped in the Basiani valley. Tamar of Georgia quickly marshaled an army throughout her possessions and put it under command of her consort, David Soslan. Georgian troops under Soslan made a sudden advance into Basiani and assailed the enemy's camp in 1203 or 1204. In a pitched battle, the Seljukid forces managed to roll back several attacks of the Georgians but were eventually overwhelmed and defeated. Loss of the sultan's banner to the Georgians resulted in a panic within the Seljuk ranks. Süleymanshah was wounded and withdrew to Erzurum. Both the Rum Seljuk and Georgian armies suffered heavy casualties, but coordinated flanking attacks won the battle for the Georgians.

Suleiman II died in 1204 and was succeeded by his son Kilij Arslan III, whose reign was unpopular. Kaykhusraw I seized Konya in 1205 reestablishing his reign. Under his rule and those of his two successors, Kaykaus I and Kayqubad I, Seljuk power in Anatolia reached its apogee. Kaykhusraw's most important achievement was the capture of the harbour of Attalia (Antalya) on the Mediterranean coast in 1207. His son Kaykaus captured Sinop and made the Empire of Trebizond his vassal in 1214. He also subjugated Cilician Armenia but in 1218 was forced to surrender Aleppo, acquired from al-Kamil. Kayqubad I continued to acquire lands along the Mediterranean coast from 1221 to 1225. In the 1220s, he sent an expeditionary force across the Black Sea to Crimea. In the east he defeated the Mengujekids and began to put pressure on the Artuqids.

=== Mongol conquest ===
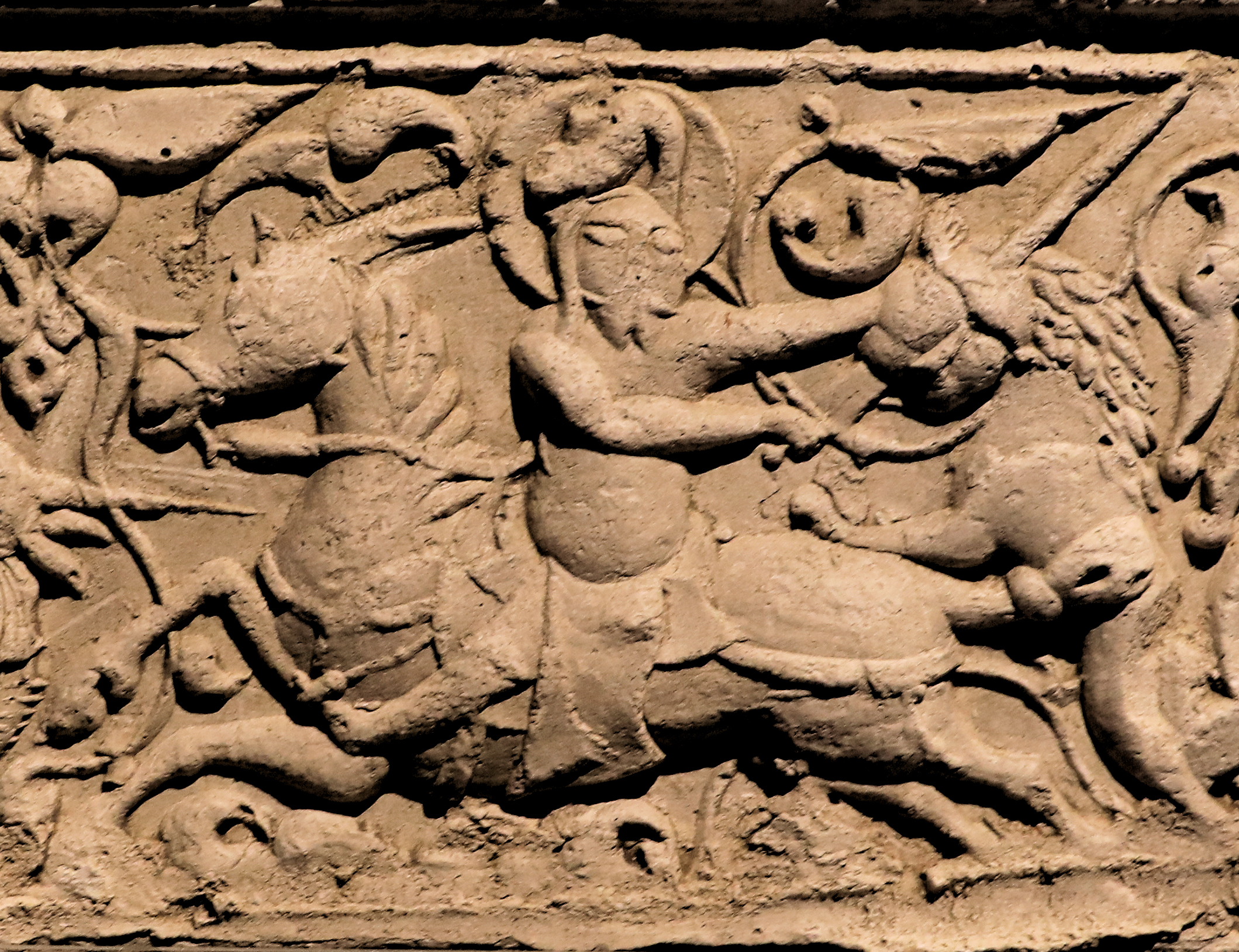
Frieze with Sultanate of Rum horseman, Konya Palace, 1156-1192.

Kaykhusraw II (1237–1246) began his reign by capturing the region around Diyarbakır, but in 1239 he had to face an uprising led by a popular preacher named Baba Ishak. After three years, when he had finally quelled the revolt, the Crimean foothold was lost and the state and the sultanate's army had weakened. It is in these conditions that he had to face a far more dangerous threat, that of the expanding Mongols. The forces of the Mongol Empire took Erzurum in 1242 and in 1243, the sultan was crushed by Baiju in the Battle of Köse Dağ (a mountain between the cities of Sivas and Erzincan), resulting in the Seljuk Turks being forced to swear allegiance to the Mongols and became their vassals. The sultan himself had fled to Antalya after the battle, where he died in 1246; his death started a period of tripartite, and then dual, rule that lasted until 1260.

The Seljuk realm was divided among Kaykhusraw's three sons. The eldest, Kaykaus II (1246–1260), assumed the rule in the area west of the river Kızılırmak. His younger brothers, Kilij Arslan IV (1248–1265) and Kayqubad II (1249–1257), were set to rule the regions east of the river under Mongol administration. In October 1256, Bayju defeated Kaykaus II near Aksaray and all of Anatolia became officially subject to Möngke Khan. In 1260 Kaykaus II fled from Konya to Crimea where he died in 1279. Kilij Arslan IV was executed in 1265, and Kaykhusraw III (1265–1284) became the nominal ruler of all of Anatolia, with the tangible power exercised either by the Mongols or the sultan's influential regents.

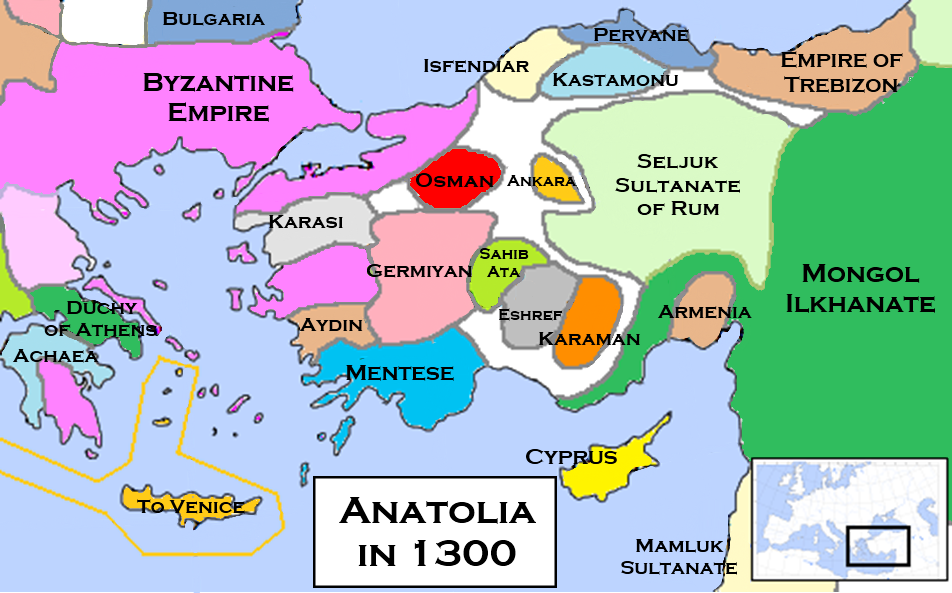
The declining Sultanate of Rûm, vassal of the Mongols, and the emerging beyliks, c. 1300

The Seljuk state had started to split into small emirates (beyliks) that increasingly distanced themselves from both Mongol and Seljuk control. In 1277, responding to a call from Anatolia, the Mamluk Sultan Baibars raided Anatolia and defeated the Mongols at the Battle of Elbistan, temporarily replacing them as the administrator of the Seljuk realm. Following the ensuing chaos, the Karamanids under Shams al-Din Mehmed managed to capture Konya, briefly installing Jimri as a puppet ruler of the Sultanate of Rum. Since the native forces who had called him to Anatolia did not manifest themselves for the defense of the land, Baibars soon had to return to his home base in Egypt, and the Mongol administration was re-assumed, officially and severely. Also, the Armenian Kingdom of Cilicia captured the Mediterranean coast from Selinos to Seleucia, as well as the cities of Marash and Behisni, from the Seljuk in the 1240s.

Near the end of his reign, Kaykhusraw III could claim direct sovereignty only over lands around Konya. Some of the beyliks (including the early Ottoman state) and Seljuk governors of Anatolia continued to recognize, albeit nominally, the supremacy of the sultan in Konya, delivering the khutbah in the name of the sultans in Konya in recognition of their sovereignty, and the sultans continued to call themselves Fahreddin, the Pride of Islam. When Kaykhusraw III was executed in 1284, the Seljuk dynasty suffered another blow from internal struggles which lasted until 1303 when the son of Kaykaus II, Mesud II, established himself as sultan in Kayseri. He was murdered in 1308 and his son Mesud III soon afterwards. A distant relative to the Seljuk dynasty momentarily installed himself as emir of Konya, but he was defeated and his lands conquered by the Karamanids in 1328. The sultanate's monetary sphere of influence lasted slightly longer and coins of Seljuk mint, generally considered to be of reliable value, continued to be used throughout the 14th century, once again, including by the Ottomans.

== Culture and society ==
The Sultanate was founded by militaristic bands of Oghuz warriors who Turkified the Anatolian peninsula, and had little in common with the primarily Persian character, language, and culture of the Seljuk rulers. (Note: "The Seljukid leaders were only too pleased to see the undisciplined bands of Oghuz warriors carry on their raiding and pillaging as far as possible from Persia proper, and Anatolia was sufficiently large and remote to fully absorb their destructive energies. (...) Anatolia became Turkified, whereas the center of the Seljuk Empire retained its primarily Persian character, language, and culture, although strong Turkic elements took root in Azerbaijan and Khorasan.") Still, a Turco-Persian cultural synthesis gradually emerged which, by the 13th century, came to define the intellectual and aesthetic life, to the point of Sultanate of Rum elites naming their sons with New Persian names. The phenomenon was reinforced by the massive influx of Persian refugees fleeing the Mongol invasions of the 13th century. The Seljuks of Rum made Turco-Persian tradition the culture of their court, and inherited the tımar and tahrir methods of Persian statecraft from the Seljuk Empire, which they later passed on to the Ottomans. Despites such influences, Seljuk art remained essentially Central Asian in character. (Note: "Despite the undoubted influence of Iranian culture on the Great Seljuks and the Anatolian Seljuks, Seljuk art remained essentially Central Asian in character.")

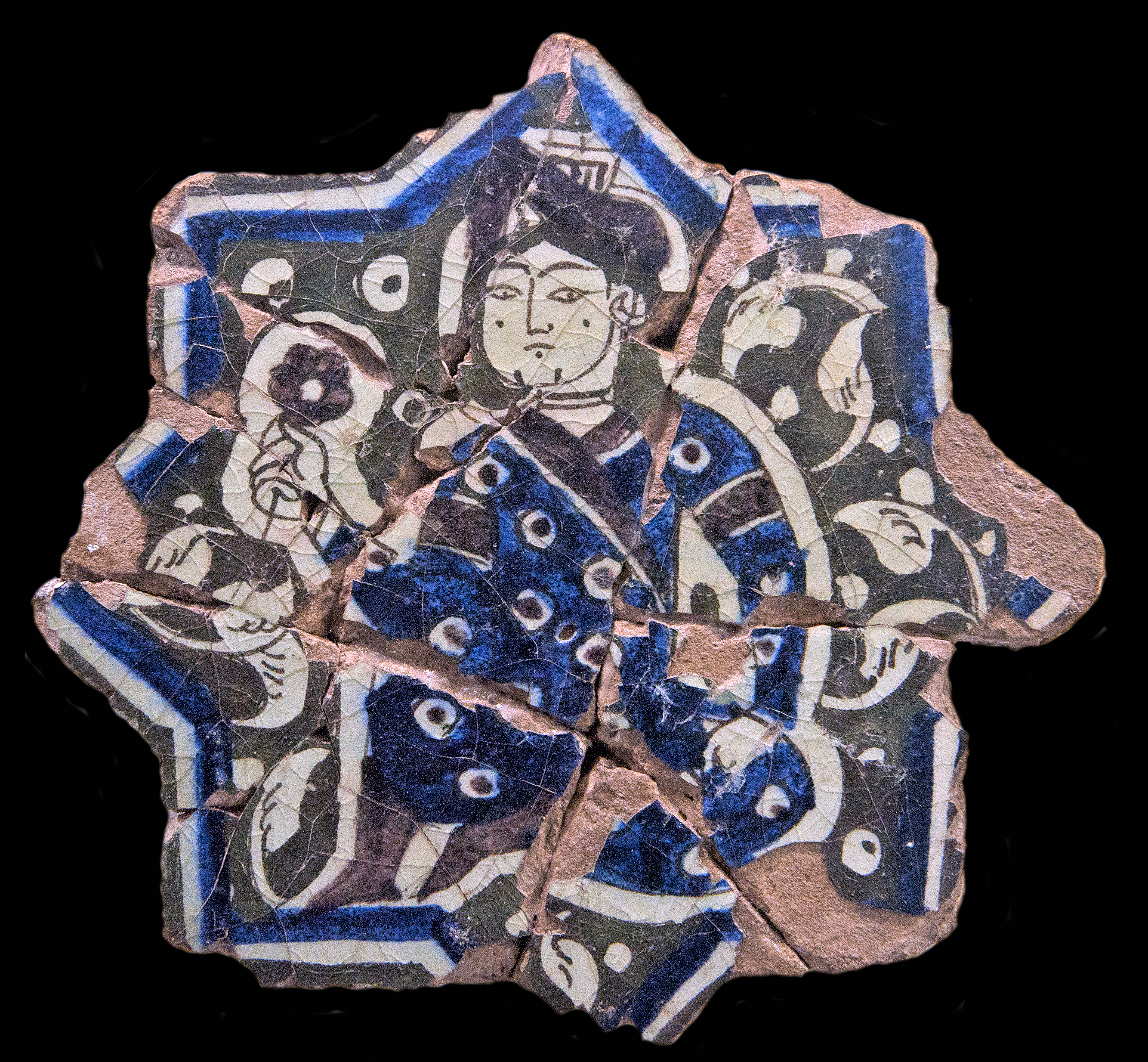
Sultan Kayqubad I (r.1220–1237) or a notable of his court, seated in Turkic style and holding a flower, symbol of eternal life. Kubadabad Palace, late 1220s.

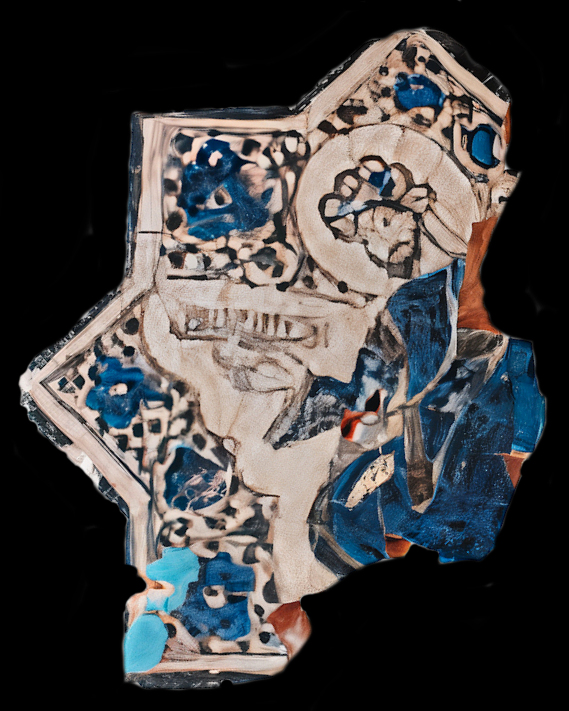
Enturbaned and bearded figure of a likely high-ranking official, holding an inscribed tablet in his hand. Kubadabad Palace, late 1220s.

As an expression of Turco-Persian culture, Rum Seljuks patronized Persian art, architecture, and literature. Unlike the Seljuk Empire, the Seljuk sultans of Rum had Persian names such as Kay Khosrow, Kay Kawad/Qobad, and Kay Kāvus. The bureaucrats and religious elite of their realm were generally Persian. In the 13th century, most Muslim inhabitants in major Anatolian urban hubs reportedly spoke Persian as their main language.

It was in the 13th century that the proneness of imitating Iran in terms of administration, religion and culture reached its zenith, encouraged by the major influx of Persian refugees fleeing Mongol invasions, who brought Persian culture with them and were instrumental in creating a "second Iran" in Anatolia. Iranian cultural, political, and literary traditions deeply influenced Anatolia in the early 13th century. The notable historian Ibn Bibi composed a six-volume Persian language poetic work called the Selçukname, modeled after the Shahnamah, which focused on the Seljuk sultans.

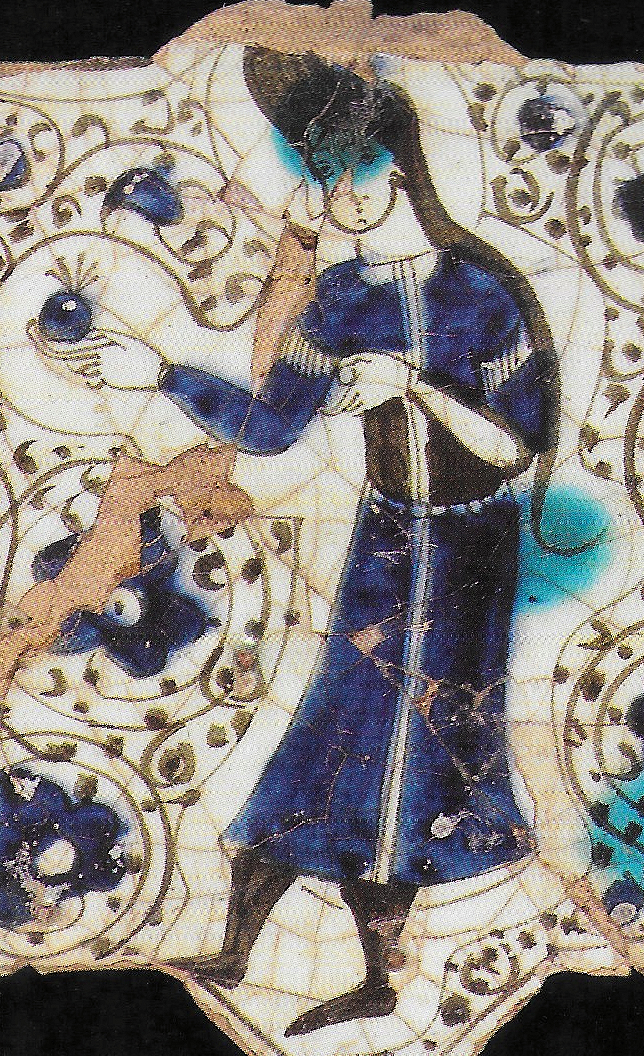
Standing man holding a pomegranate. Late 1220s, Kubadabad.

Despite their Turkic origins, the Seljuks used Persian for administrative purposes; even their histories, which replaced Arabic, were in Persian. Their usage of Turkish was hardly promoted at all. Even Sultan Kilij Arslan II, as a child, spoke to courtiers in Persian. Khanbaghi states the Anatolian Seljuks were even more Persianized than the Seljuks that ruled the Iranian plateau. Persian poetry was written by sultans Suleiman II, Kayqubad I, and Kaykhusraw II. Written documents used either Persian or Anatolian Turkic, but the army used the Turkic language exclusively. (Note: "However, scholarship and literature were influences by Iran, and Persian was used alonside Antolian Turkic in written documents during this period, although Turkic was the only language used by the army.")

The Rahat al-sudur, the history of the Great Seljuk Empire and its breakup, written in Persian by Muhammad bin Ali Rawandi, was dedicated to Sultan Kaykhusraw I. Even the Tārikh-i Āl-i Saldjūq, an anonymous history of the Sultanate of Rum, was written in Persian. The sultans of Rum were largely not educated in Arabic. This clearly limited the Arab influence, or at least the direct influence, to a relatively small degree. In contrast, Persian literature and Iranian influence expanded because most sultans and even a significant portion of the townspeople knew the language.

One of its most famous Persian writers, Rumi, took his name from the name of the state. Moreover, Byzantine influence in the Sultanate was also significant, since Byzantine Greek aristocracy remained part of the Seljuk nobility, and the native Byzantine (Rûm) peasants remained numerous in the region. Based on their genealogy, it appears that the Seljuk sultans favored Christian slave-concubines, just like the early Ottoman sultans. Within the Seljuk harem, Greek women were the most dominant.

In Anatolia, Turkic languages and culture were present, but they stayed at the edges of the Irano-Greek world, mainly kept alive by nomadic Turkic groups through oral tradition. Turkic culture held little prestige, and many viewed it as inferior. As a result, nobles and middle-class Turkic families (and possibly lower classes) often married into what was considered more "cultured" communities, learned Persian and Greek, and adopted urban customs to elevate their social standing. Some sultans merged Iranian and Greek identities by claiming to be the khusraw-i Yunan ("the Chosroes of Greece"). Cultural Turkification in Anatolia first started during the 14th-century, particularly during the gradual rise of the Ottomans. With a population that included Byzantine Greeks, Armenians, Kurds, Turks, and Persians, the Seljuks were very successful between 1220 and 1250 and set the groundwork for later Islamization of Anatolia.

From the 12th century onward, Western European chroniclers often referred to Anatolia and the Sultanate of Rum as Turchia, the predecessor of the name Turkey.

== Religion ==
The Rum Seljuks sought to establish themselves as orthodox sovereigns dedicated to preserving and defending the structures of Sunni Islam. They sponsored the construction of many madrasas, mosques, and mausolea, expressing their religious devotion through sustained patronage of the ʿulamāʾ and affording them institutional platforms from which to preach to—and potentially convert—the Greek and Armenian Christian communities within their domains.

In 1084, Suleiman ibn Qutalmish transformed the church of Cassianus in Antioch into a mosque. The construction of the Alâeddin Mosque in Konya, began during sultan Mesud I's reign c. 1116-1156. In 1196, the Friday Mosque of Sivas was constructed during the reigns of Kaykhusraw I and Rukn al-Din Suleiman II. With the capture of Antalya in 1207, Kaykhusraw I established a mosque, while in c.1211 Kaykaus I constructed a madrasa at Ankara. After capturing Sinop in 1214, Kaykaus I also sponsored the construction of both a mosque and a madrasa in the city. Both Kaykaus I and Kayqubad I commissioned the renovation and expansion of the Alâeddin Mosque, and by 1220, five small mosques had also been built in Konya. (Note: Andrew Petersen contends the mosque was built between 1219 and 1221 by Kayqubad I.) (Note: "...the eastern wing of the prayer hall of the Alaeddin mosque in Konya, probably dating to the rebuilding program of Sultan 'Ala' al-Din Kayqubad I.") After taking Sudak c.1221, Kayqubad I constructed a mosque. In 1232, the Alaeddin Mosque of Uluborlu was built, with an inscription attributing its patronage to 'Ismat al-Dunya wa 'l-Din, the wife of Sultan Kayqubad I. In 1253, Kayqubad I's daughter, Khodavand Khatun, patronized the Çifte Minareli Medrese in Erzurum. In 1271–1272, during the reign of Ghiyath al-Din Kaykhusraw III, the Buruciye Medrese was constructed in Sivas.

According to Patricia Blessing, by the mid-thirteenth century, the Seljuk sultans had largely ceased direct architectural patronage. New figures such as high-ranking viziers assumed the role of architectural sponsors. In 1265, Sahib ‘Ata Fakhr al-Din ‘Ali, vizier to Rukn al-Din Kilij Arslan IV, patronized the construction of the Sahib Ata Complex in Konya, which included a mosque, bathhouse, mausoleum, and khanqah. In 1271, Sahib Ata also patronized the construction of the Gök Medrese in Sivas.

== Architecture ==
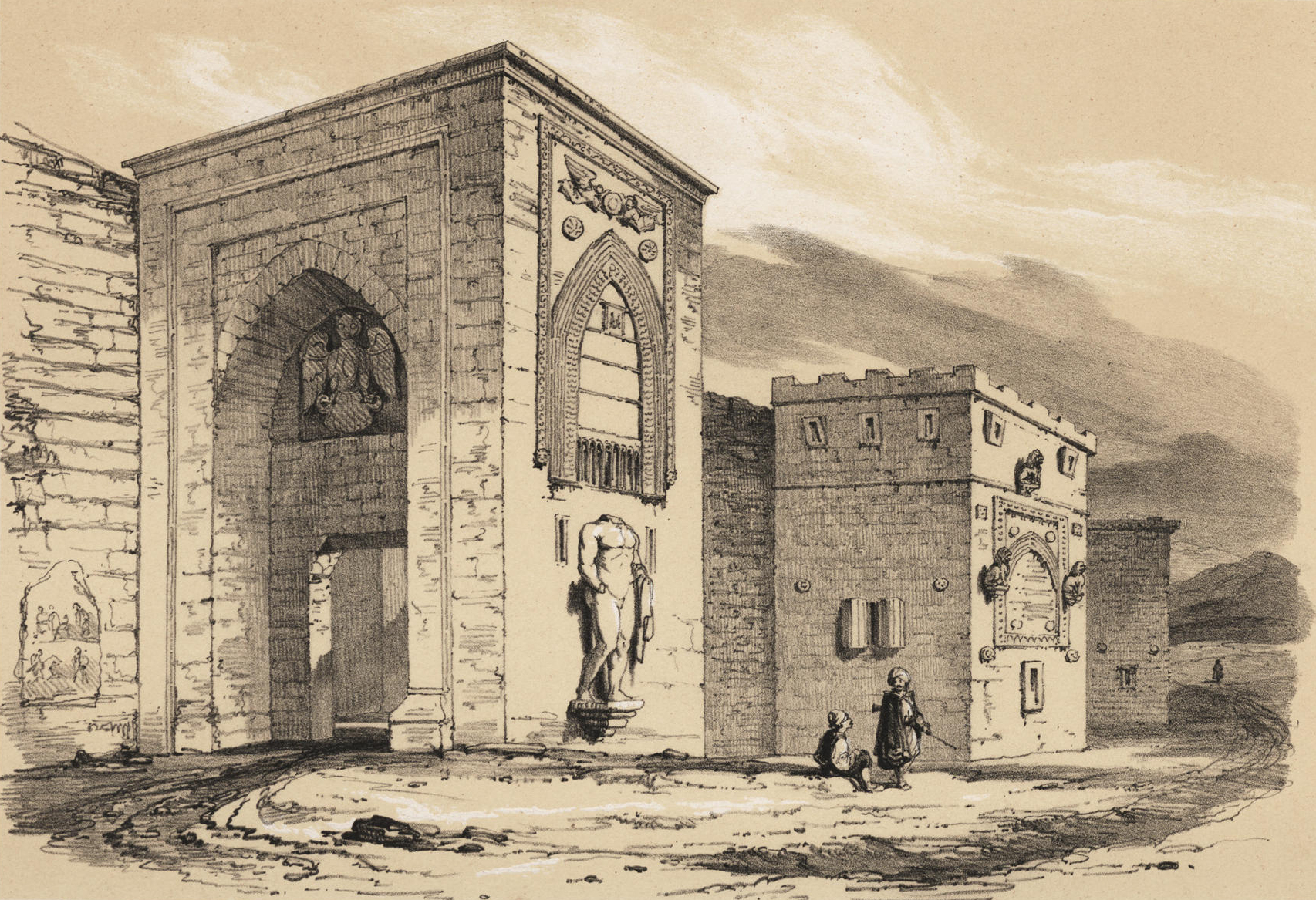
The Konya citadel (city walls of Konya), built and decorated by Kayqubad I in the 1220s, incorporated many Greco-Roman Classical elements for its decoration. Léon de Laborde, 1838

Architectural styles of the Sultanate of Rum were rather eclectic. The walls of Konya in particular, built by Kayqubad I, adopted many western decorative elements, such as a statue of Hercules, a frieze from a Roman sarcophagus, courtly scenes with seated figures in toga, winged deities around the figure of the sun, mixed with inscriptions in Arabic. It would seem that such symbolism mixing Western and Eastern elements was mostly derived from the influence of the Artuqids, who were adept at combining Classical and Perso-Islamic approaches.

In their construction of caravanserais, madrasas and mosques, the Rum Seljuks translated the Iranian Seljuk architecture of bricks and plaster into the use of stone. Among these, the caravanserais (or hans), used as stops, trading posts and defense for caravans, and of which about a hundred structures were built during the Anatolian Seljuk period, are particularly remarkable. Along with Persian influences, which had an indisputable effect, Seljuk architecture was inspired by local Byzantine architects, for example in the Celestial Mosque in Sivas, and by Armenian architecture. Anatolian architecture represents some of the most distinctive and impressive constructions in the entire history of Islamic architecture. Later, this Anatolian architecture would be inherited by the Sultanate of India.

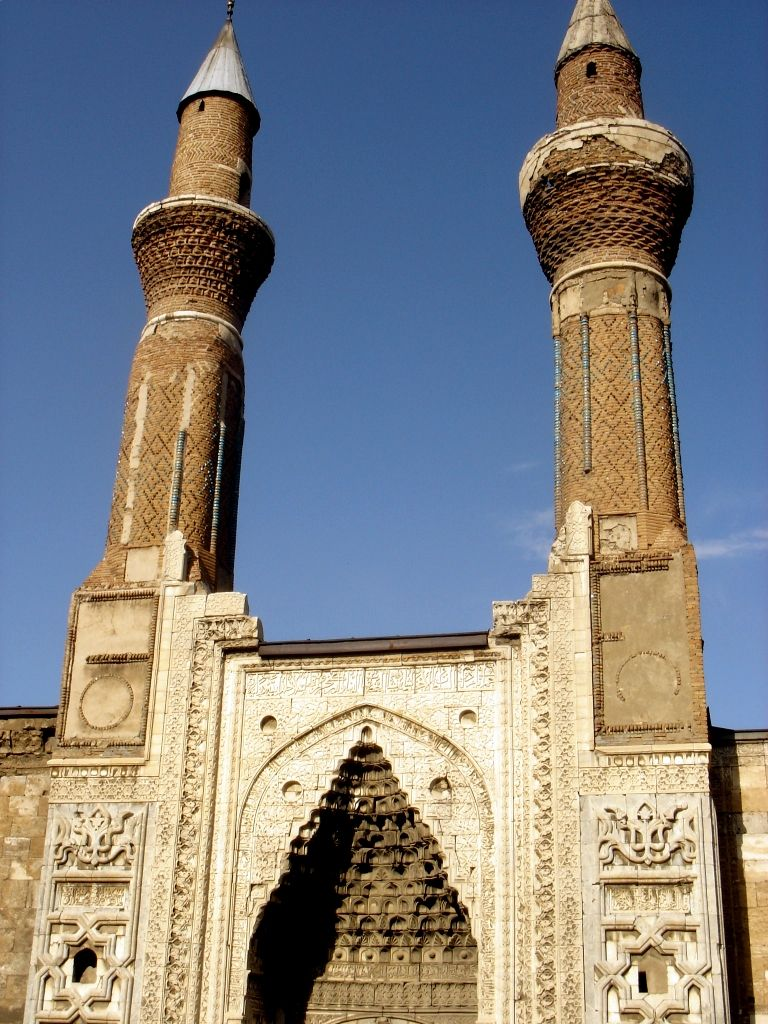
Gök Medrese (Celestial Madrasa) of Sivas, built by a Greek (Rûm) subject in the periodic capital of the Sultanate of Rum in 1271

The largest caravanserai is the Sultan Han (built 1229) on the road between Konya and Aksaray, in Sultanhanı, covering 3,900 m^{2} (42,000 sq ft). Two caravanserais carry the name Sultan Han, the other one being between Kayseri and Sivas. Furthermore, apart from Sultanhanı, five other towns across Turkey owe their names to caravanserais built there. These are Alacahan in Kangal, Durağan, Hekimhan and Kadınhanı, as well as the township of Akhan within the Denizli metropolitan area. The caravanserai of Hekimhan is unique in having, underneath the usual inscription in Arabic with information relating to the tower, two further inscriptions in Armenian and Syriac, since it was constructed by the sultan Kayqubad I's doctor (hekim), who is thought to have been a Christian convert to Islam.

There are other particular cases, like the settlement in Kalehisar contiguous to an ancient Hittite site near Alaca, founded by the Seljuk commander Hüsameddin Temurlu, who had taken refuge in the region after the defeat in the Battle of Köse Dağ and had founded a township comprising a castle, a madrasa, a habitation zone and a caravanserai, which were later abandoned apparently around the 16th century. All but the caravanserai, which remains undiscovered, was explored in the 1960s by the art historian Oktay Aslanapa, and the finds as well as several documents attest to the existence of a vivid settlement in the site, such as a 1463 Ottoman firman which instructs the headmaster of the madrasa to lodge not in the school but in the caravanserai.

The Seljuk palaces, as well as their armies, were staffed with ghilmān (Arabic: غِلْمَان), singular ghulam), slave-soldiers taken as children from non-Muslim communities, mainly Greeks from former Byzantine territories. The practice of keeping ghilmān may have offered a model for the later devşirme during the time of the Ottoman Empire.

== Literature ==
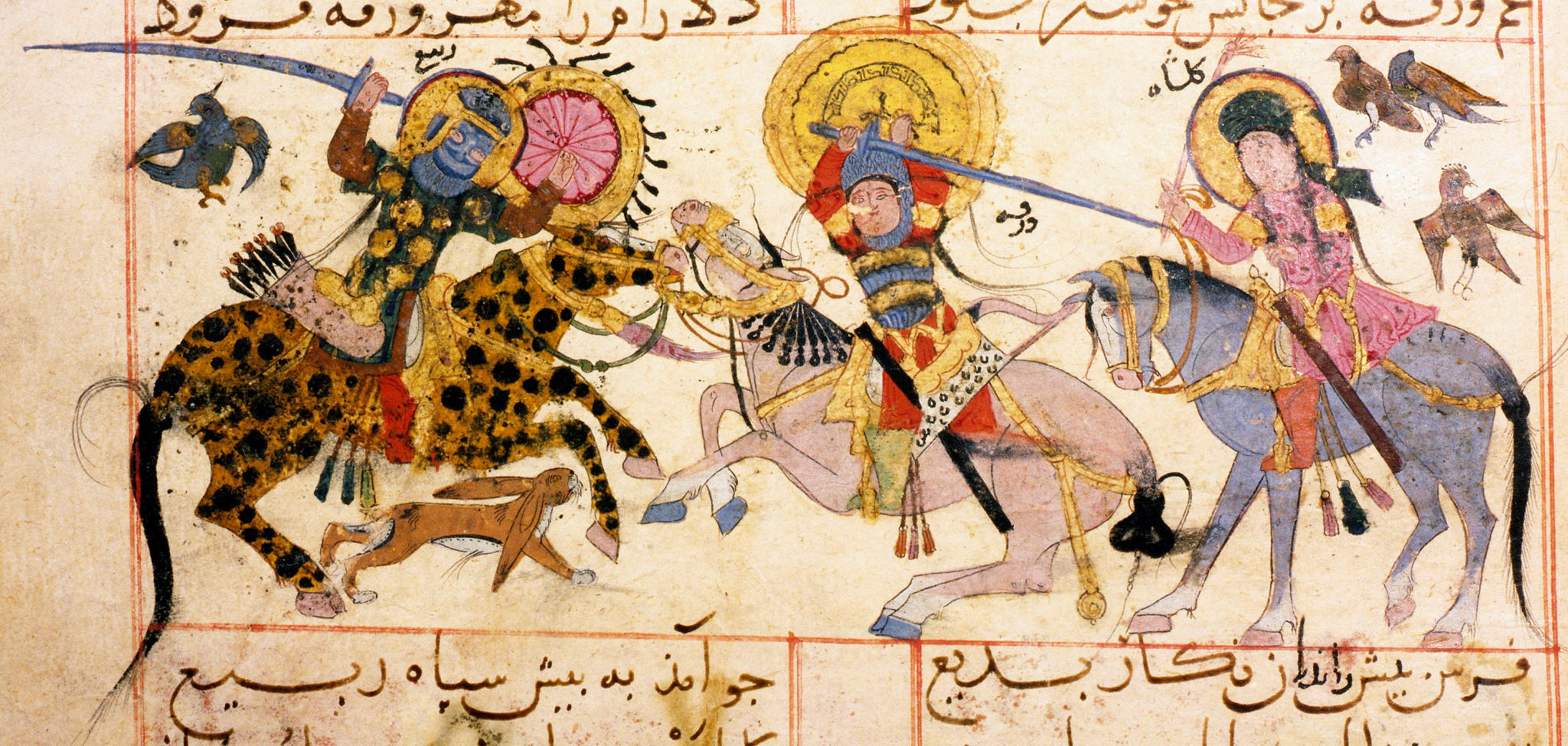
Battle scene in Varka and Golshah, 1225–1250 miniature, Konya, Sultanate of Rum.

The earliest known illustrated manuscript in the Persian language is an early 13th century copy of the epic Varka and Golshah, which was most probably created in Konya, under the Seljuk Sultanate of Rum. It can be dated to c.1250. (Note: The two scenes in the top and bottom registers (...) may be strongly influenced by contemporary Seljuk Persian (...) like those in the recently discovered Varqeh and Gulshah (p.92) (...) In the painting the facial cast of these Turks is obviously reflected, and so are the special fashions and accoutrements they favored. (p.162, commentary on image from p.91).)

The miniatures represent typical Central Asian people, thickset with large round heads. They also provide rare depictions of the contemporary military of the Seljuk period, and may have influenced other known depictions of Turkic Seljuk soldiers. All depicted costumes and accoutrements are contemporary to the artist, in the 13th century. The miniatures constitute the first known example of illustrated Persian-language manuscript, dating from the pre-Mongol era, and are useful in studying weapons of the period. Particularly, metal face masks and chainmail helmets in Turkic fashion, and armor with small metal plates connected through straps, large round shields (the largest of them called "kite-shields") and long teardrop shields, armoured horses are depicted. The weapons and armour types depicted in the miniatures were common in the Middle East and the Caucasus in the Seljuk era.

Persian was the preferred language for literature, while Arabic remained the standard language for religious, scientific, and philosophical writing. "For literary works, however, Persian remained the preferred language while, as elsewhere in the Middle East, Arabic remained the standard medium for religious, scientific, and philosophical writing."

== Numismatics ==
The earliest documented Rum Seljuq copper coins were made in the first part of the twelfth century in Konya and the eastern Anatolian emirates. Extensive numismatic evidence suggests that, starting in the middle of the thirteenth century and continuing until the end of the Seljuk dynasty, silver-producing mints and silver coinage flourished, particularly in central and eastern Anatolia.

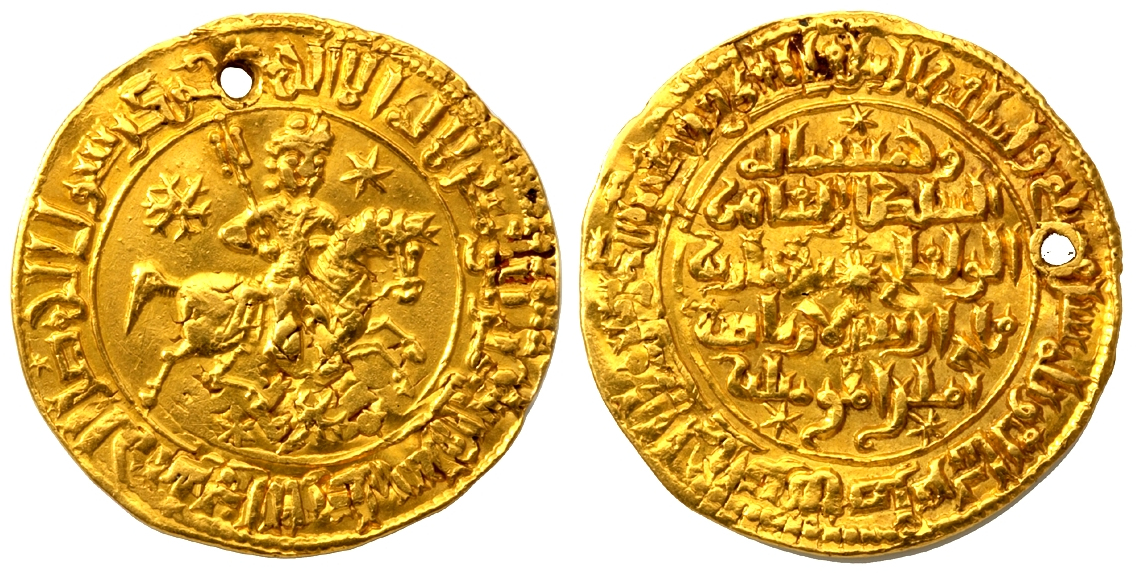
Gold coinage of Suleiman II of Rum, Konya, 597 H (1200–1201 CE)

Most of Kilij Arslan II's coins were minted in Konya between 1177–78 and 1195, with a small amount also occurring in Sivas, which the Rum Seljuks conquered from the Danishmendids. Sivas may have started minting coins in 1185–1186. The majority of Kılıj Arslan II's coins are silver dirhams; however, there are also a few dinars and one or two fulūs (small copper coins) issues. Following his death the sultanate was divided among his sons. Muhyiddin Mesut, son of Kilij Arslan II, minted coins in the northwesterly cities of Ankara, Çankırı, Eskişehir, and Kaztamunu from 1186 to 1200. Tughril ibn Kılıç Arslan II's reign in Erzurum, another son of Kilij Arslan II, minted silver dirhams in 1211–1212.

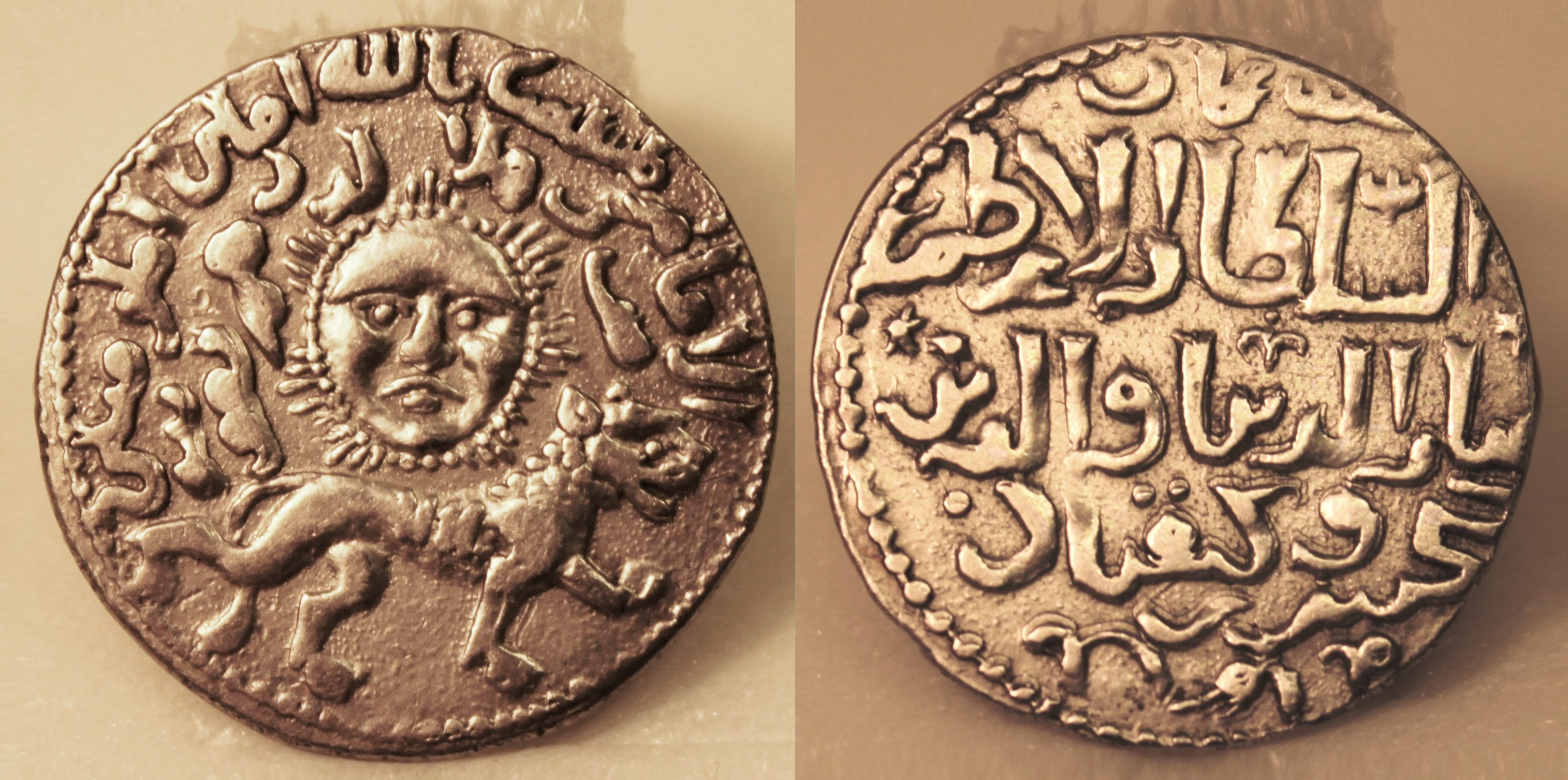
Dirham of Kaykhusraw II (r. 1239–46). Astrological Device (Sun-Lion, symbol of an ideal ruler in the Great Age of the Seljuqs) dated 638 AH (1240–41 AD). Legend in Arabic.

The sun-lion and the equestrian are the two central motifs in the Rum Seljuq numismatic figural repertoire. The image of a horseman with two more arrows ready and his bow taut represents strength and control and is a representation of the ideal Seljuq king of the Great Age. The image initially appeared on Rum Seljuq copper coins in the late eleventh century. The first to add equestrian iconography to silver and gold coins was Suleiman II of Rûm. Antalya minted coins with Kaykaus I's name from November 1261 to November 1262. Between 1211 and 1219, the bulk of his coins are minted at Konya and Sivas.

A significant portion of the Islamic Near East may have experienced a "silver famine" owing to little, or very little, silver mintings from the eleventh and most of the twelfth centuries. However, at the start of the thirteenth century a "silver flood" occurred in Rum Seljuq territory when Anatolian silver mines were discovered. The fineness of Rum Seljuq dirhams is similar to that of dinars; frequently, both were struck using the same dies. The Seljuq silver coinage's superior quality and prominence contributed to the dynasty's affluence throughout the early part of the thirteenth century and explains why it served as a kind of anchor for the local "currency community." The Empire of Trebizond and Armenian Kingdom of Cilicia silver coins were modeled after the fineness and weight specifications of Rum Seljuq coins.

== Dynasty ==
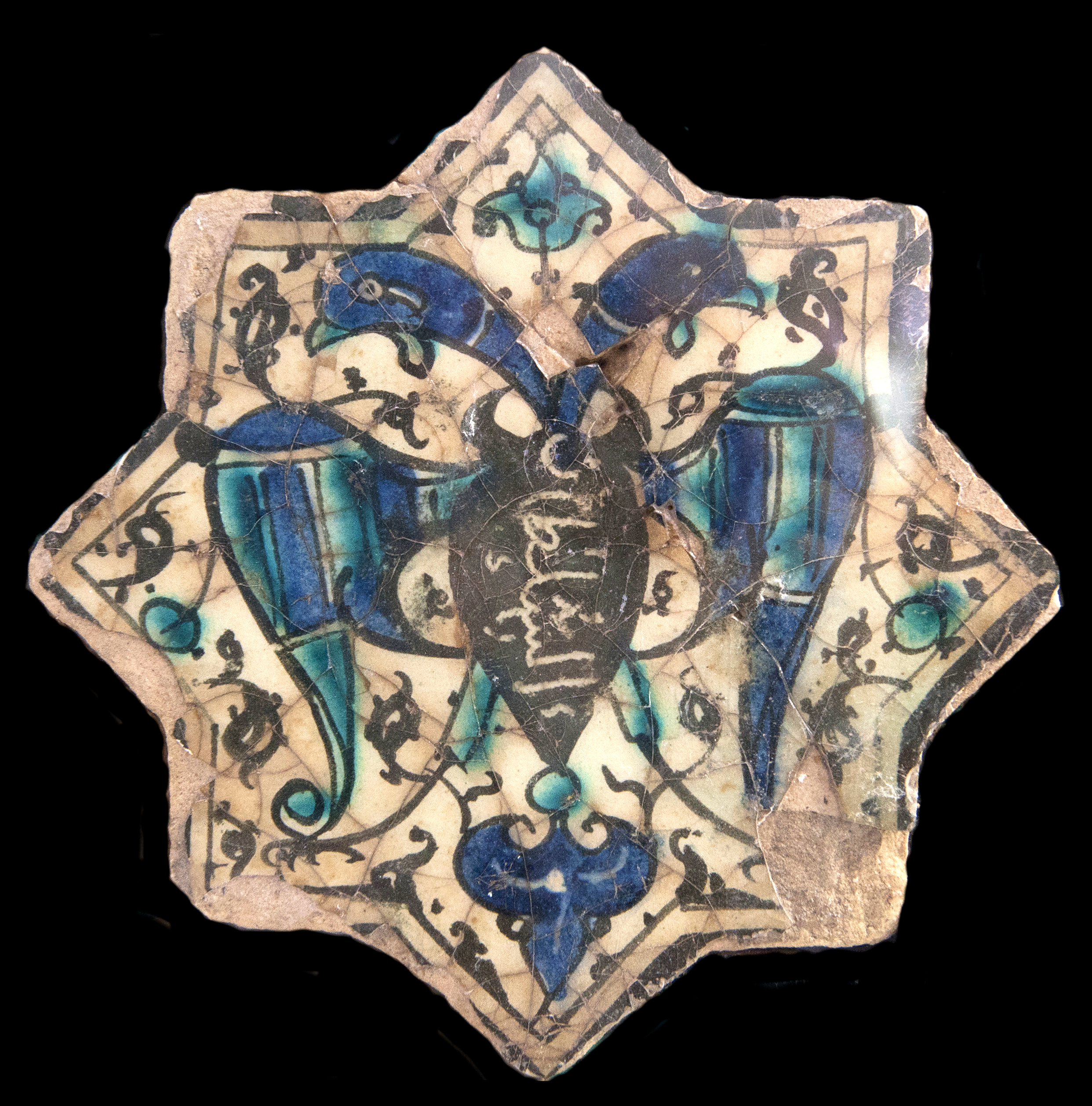
Double-headed eagle, with "al-Sultan" inscription on the chest. Kubadabad Palace, 1220s.

As regards with the names of the sultans, there are variants in form and spelling depending on the preferences displayed by one source or the other, either for fidelity in transliterating the Persian variant of the Arabic script which the sultans used, or for a rendering corresponding to the modern Turkish phonology and orthography. Some sultans had two names that they chose to use alternatively in reference to their legacy. While the two palaces built by Alaeddin Keykubad I carry the names Kubadabad Palace and Keykubadiye Palace, he named his mosque in Konya as Alâeddin Mosque and the port city of Alanya he had captured as "Alaiye". Similarly, the medrese built by Kaykhusraw I in Kayseri, within the complex (külliye) dedicated to his sister Gevher Nesibe, was named Gıyasiye Medrese, and the one built by Kaykaus I in Sivas as Izzediye Medrese.

| Sultan | Reign | Notes |
|---|---|---|
| 1. Qutalmish | 1060–1064 | Contended with Alp Arslan for succession to the Imperial Seljuk throne. |
| 2. Suleiman ibn Qutulmish | 1075–1077 de facto rules Turkmen around İznik and İzmit; 1077–1086 recognised Sultan of Rûm by Malik-Shah I of the Great Seljuks | Founder of Anatolian Seljuk Sultanate with capital in İznik |
| 3. Kilij Arslan I | 1092–1107 | First sultan in Konya |
| 4. Malik Shah | 1107–1116 | |
| 5. Mesud I | 1116–1156 | |
| 6. 'Izz al-Din Kilij Arslan II | 1156–1192 | |
| 7. Ghiyath al-Din Kaykhusraw I | 1192–1196 | First reign |
| 8. Rukn al-Din Suleiman II | 1196–1204 | |
| 9. Kilij Arslan III | 1204–1205 | |
| (7.) Ghiyath al-Din Kaykhusraw I | 1205–1211 | Second reign |
| 10. 'Izz al-Din Kayka'us I | 1211–1220 | |
| 11. 'Ala al-Din Kayqubad I | 1220–1237 | |
| 12. Ghiyath al-Din Kaykhusraw II | 1237–1246 | After his death, sultanate split until 1260 when Kilij Arslan IV remained the sole ruler |
| 13. 'Izz al-Din Kayka'us II | 1246–1262 | |
| 14. Rukn al-Din Kilij Arslan IV | 1249–1266 | |
| 15. 'Ala al-Din Kayqubad II | 1249–1254 | |
| 16. Ghiyath al-Din Kaykhusraw III | 1266–1284 | |
| 17. Ghiyath al-Din Masud II | 1282–1296 | First reign |
| 18. 'Ala al-Din Kayqubad III | 1298–1302 | |
| (17.) Ghiyath al-Din Masud II | 1303–1308 | Second reign |

=== Family tree ===
The colors of the boxes are as follows
Seljuks of Anatolia : Great Seljuk: Non reigning members:

Tukak Temur; Yalig Beg; Commander-in-chief of The Oghuz army or Khazar army
Seljuk Beg; The founder of Seljuk dynasty
Arslan Yabgu; Chief of Seljuk dynasty | Mikail | Musa Yabgu | Yunus
Qutalmish; Father of the founder of Anatolian Seljuk Sultanate | Chaghri-Beg; Governor of Khorasan | Toghrul I Sultan of Great Seljuk
Suleyman I of Rum (1077–1086) | Alp Arslan; Sultan of Great Seljuk
Kilij Arslan I (1092–1107)
Mesut I (1116–1156) | Melikshah (1110–1116)
Kilij Arslan II (1156–1192)
Suleyman II (1196–1204) | Keyhusrev I (1192–1196) & (1205–1211)
Kilij Arslan III (1204–1205) | Keykaus I (1211–1220) | Ala Al-Din Kayqubad I (1220–1237)
Keyhusrev II (1237–1246)
Kilij Arslan IV (Note: After 1249 triple reign of three brothers) (1249–1266) | Keykaus II (1246–1257) | Kayqubad II (1249–1254)
Keyhusrev III (1266–1284) | Faramurz | Mesut II (1284–1296) & (1303-1307)
Kayqubad III (1296–1302)

=== Comparative genealogy ===
The comparative genealogy of the Sultanate of Rûm with their contemporary neighbors in Central Asia

Tuqaq Temur; Beg; Commander-in-chief of the Oghuz army | Ma'munid rulers in Chorasmia (r. 995-1017)
Seljuk Beg; The founder of Seljuk dynasty | Altun Tash (1017-1032)
Arslan Yabgu; Chief of Seljuk dynasty | Mikail ibn Seljuk | The mother of Toghrul, Chaghri, Ibrahim & Artash | Yûsuf Inal | Yûnus | Mûsâ(İnanç)Yabgu | Harun (Ghaznavid Governor of Khwarezm) (r. 1032-1035) | Ismail Khandan (r. 1035-1041)
Rasūl Tagīn | Qutalmish; Father of the founder of Anatolian Seljuk Sultanate | Toghrul I The first sultan of Seljuks (r. 1037–1063) | Chaghri Beg; Co-ruler of the Seljuk Empire | Ibrahim Inal | Artash Inal | Abu Ali Hasan Yabgu | Yûsuf, Kara Arslan, Abu Bakr, Umar, Bori & Dawlatshah | Shah Malik (r. 1041-1042)
Mānsūr | Suleyman I Shah of Rûm (r. 1077–1086) | Alp Ilig and Dawlat | Suleiman (r. 1063) | Alp Arslan (r. 1063–1072) | Kavurt Beg (r. 1048–1073); Kirman Seljuks | Seljuk rule in Khwarazm (r. 1042-1077)
Abu'l-Qasim (İznik) (r. 1086-1092) | Abu'l Ghazi Hasan Bey (Kayseri) | Malik-Shah I (r. 1072–1092) | Kīrmān Shah (r. 1073–1074) | Sultan Shah (r. 1074–1085) | Turan I Shah (r. 1085–1097) | Anūsh Tekīn (r. 1077-1097)
Ayisha Khātun (r. in Malatya) | Kilij Arslan I (r. 1092–1107) | Kulan Arslan (Dāvûd) | Mahmud I (r. 1092–1094) | Barkiyaruq (r. 1092–1104) | Arslan Shah I (r. 1101–1142) | Muhammad I Mālīk Shah (r. 1142–1156) | Îrânshah (r. 1097–1101) | Ekinchi (r. 1097)
Toghrul Arslan (r. 1107-1124) | Malīk Shah of Rûm (r. 1110–1116) | Muhammad I Tapar (r. 1105–1118) | Malik-Shah II (r. 1104-1105) | Toghrul Shah (r. 1156–1170) | Bahrām Shah (r. 1170 - 1175); Arslan II Shah (r. 1170 - 1177) | Turan II Shah (r. 1177–1183); Muhammad II (r. 1183–1187) | Qutbū'd-Dīn; Muhammad (r. 1097-1127)
Gündüz Alp | Rukn ad-Dīn Mas'ūd I (r. 1116–1156) | Malīk Arab (r. 1116-1127) in Ankara | Ahmad Sanjar (r. 1118-1153); Last Sultan of The Great Seljuk | Mahmud II (r. 1118–1131); First sultan of The Iraqi Seljuks | Toghrul II (r. 1132–1134); Masud (r. 1134–1152) | Suleiman-Shah (r. 1159–1160) | Qizil Arslan (r. 1191) de facto ruler of Toghrul III; Atabeg of the Eldiguzids | ʿAlāʾ ad-Dīn Ātsız (r. 1127-1156)
Danismendli Grooms Yağıbasan (Sivas) & ZūnNūn (Kayseri) | ʿIzz ad-Dīn; Kilij Arslan II (r. 1156–1192) | Malīk Shāhīn Shāh (Ankara, Çankırı, Kastamonu); Daulat | Dawud (r. 1131–1132) | Malik-Shah III (r. 1152–1153); Muhammad II (r. 1153–1159) | Arslan-Shah (r. 1160–1177) | Toghrul III (r. 1177–1191, 1192–1194); Last sultan | Terken Khatun | Tāj ad-Dīn; İl-Arslan (r. 1156-1172)
Rukn ad-Dīn Suleyman II Shah of Rûm (r. 1196–1204) | The mothers of ʿIzz ad-Dīn; Kay Kāwus I and Jalāl ad-Dīn Kay Farīdûn | Ghiyāth ad-Dīn; Kay Khusraw I (r. 1192–1196) & (r. 1205–1211) | Dawlat Raziya Khatun | Malīka İsmetū'd-DīnGevher Nesibe Sultan | Qutbū'd-Dīn; Malīk Shāh (Sivas, Aksaray); Arslan Shāh (Niğde) | Terken Khatun de facto ruler of Muhammad | ʿAlāʾ ad-Dīn Takish (r. 1172-1200) | Jalāl ad-Dīn Sultān Shāh (r. 1172-1193)
Kilij Arslan III (r. 1204–1205) | ʿIzz ad-Dīn; Kay Kāwus I (r. 1211–1220) | Hunad-Māh Pari Khātun of Kir Fard of Alanya Castle | ʿAlāʾ ad-Dīn; Kay Qubād I (r. 1220–1237) | Malīka Ādīla Ghāzīya Khātun of Ayyubids | Muhyi'd-Dīn Masud Shāh (Ankara, Çankırı, Eskişehir) | Nurū'd-[Dīn Mahmud Sultān Shāh (Kayseri) | ʿAlāʾ ad-Dīn Muhammad (r. 1200-1220) | Jalāl al-Dīn Mangubardī (r. 1220-1231)
Jalāl ad-Dīn; Kay Farīdûn (Koyulhisar) | Sāhīp Shams ad-Dīn Īsfahānī (1246–1249) (Note: Grand Vizier Sāhīp Shams ad-Dīn Īsfahānī ruled the country on behalf of ʿIzz ad-Dīn Kay Kāwus II between 1246 and 1249) | Bardūlīya Khātun (Prodoulia) | Ghiyāth ad-Dīn; Kay Khusraw II (r. 1237–1246) | Gurju Khatun (Bagrationi dynasty of Georgians) | Mu‘in ad-Dīn Suleyman (Note: Grand Vizier Parwāna Mu‘in al-Din Suleyman ruled the country on behalf of Ghiyāth ad-Dīn Kay Khusraw III between 1266 and 2 August 1277 (1 Rabi' al-awwal 676)) (Parwāna) | ʿIzz ad-Dīn; Kilij Arslan, Rukn ad-Dīn and two daughters | Mugisū'd-Dīn Toghrul Shāh (Elbistan); Muizū'd-Dīn Kāysar Shāh (Malatya) | Ögedei established the Mongol rule in Khwarezmia (r. 1229–1241)
Karîm ad-Dīn Karaman Bey (r. 1256–1263) (Karamanoğulları; Anatolian Beylik) | Unknown son | ʿIzz ad-Dīn; Kay Kāwus II (1246–1249) (Note: Between 1246 and 1249 ʿIzz ad-Dīn Kay Kāwus II reigned alone) (r. 1249–1254) & (r. 1254-1262) (Note: ʿIzz ad-Dīn Kay Kāwus II was defeated on October 14, 1256 in Sultanhanı (Sultan Han, Aksaray) and he acceded to the throne on May 1, 1257 again after the departure of Baiju Noyan from Anatolia) | Rukn ad-Dīn; Kilij Arslan IV (r. 1249–1254) & (r. 1257-1262) & (1262-1266) (Note: Between 1262 and 1266 Rukn ad-Dīn Kilij Arslan IV reigned alone) | ʿAlāʾ ad-Dīn Kay Qubād II (Note: Between 1249 and 1254 triple reign of three brothers) (r. 1249–1254) | Pervâneoğulları Anatolian Beylik (established in Sinop in 1277) | Nizāmū'd-Dīn Argun Shāh (Amasya); Sanjar Shāh (Ereğli) | Nasirū'd-Dīn Barkyāruk Shāh (Niksar, Koyulhisar) | Möngke appointed Hulagu, the son of Tolui, as Il khan of the Mongol Empire in 1253
Karamanoğlu Shams ad-Dīn Mehmed Bey (Grand Vizier of ʿAlāʾ ad-Dīn Sīyāvuş) | ʿAlāʾ ad-Dīn Sīyāvuş (15 May 1277 - 20 June 1277) (Note: According to İbn Bîbî, el-Evâmirü’l-ʿAlâʾiyye, p. 727. (10 Dhu al-Hijjah 675 - 17 Muharram 676)) or (Note: According to Yazıcıoğlu Ali, Tevârih-i Âl-i Selçuk, p. 62. (10 Dhu al-Hijjah 677 - 17 Muharram 678)) (24 April 1279 - 30 May 1279) | Ghiyāth ad-Dīn Mas'ūd II (r. 1282–1284) & (r. 1284–1296) | Farāmurz | Ghiyāth ad-Dīn; Kay Khusraw III (r. 1266–1282) & (r. 1282–1284) | Mu‘in ad-Dīn Mehmed (r. 1277-1297) | Mū'hazzab ūd-Dīn Ali | Kubilai endorsed Abaqa, the son of Hulagu, as Il-Khan in 1270 (r. 1265–1282) | Ahmad Tagüdar (r. 1282–1284)
Uç Beylik of Osman established | ʿAlāʾ ad-Dīn Kay Qubād III (r. 1298-1302) | Mū'hazzab ūd-Dīn Masūd (r. 1297-1300) | Taraqay | Arghun (r. 1284–1291) | Gaykhatu (r. 1291–1295)
Osman of Ottomans (r. 1299-1323/4) | Ghiyāth ad-Dīn Mas'ūd II (r. 1303-1308) | Gazi Chelebi (r. 1300-1322) | Baydu (r. 1295) | Ghazan (r. 1295–1304) | Öljaitü (r. 1304–1316)

== See also ==
- Constantine Melik
- Ghias ad-Din
- Babai Revolt
- Byzantine–Seljuk wars
- List of battles involving the Seljuk Empire
- List of wars involving the Sultanate of Rum
- Rûm Eyalet, Ottoman Empire

== Sources ==
- Beihammer, Alexander Daniel (2017). Byzantium and the Emergence of Muslim–Turkish Anatolia, Ca. 1040–1130. Routledge. ISBN 9781351983853.
- Blessing, Patricia (2016). Rebuilding Anatolia after the Mongol Conquest. Ashgate.
- Blessing, Patricia (2022). Architecture and Material Politics in the Fifteenth-century Ottoman Empire. Cambridge University Press. ISBN 9781009051187.
- Cahen, Claude (1968). Pre-Ottoman Turkey: A General Survey of the Material and Spiritual Culture and History, 1071–1330. New York: Taplinger. pp. 144–146.
- Cahen, Claude; Holt, Peter Malcolm (2001). The Formation of Turkey. The Seljukid Sultanate of Rūm: Eleventh to Fourteenth Century. Longman.
- Canby, Sheila R.; Beyazit, Deniz; Rugiadi, Maryam; Peacock, A.C.S., eds. (2016). Court and Cosmos: The Great Age of the Seljuqs. Metropolitan Museum of Art.
- Canfield, Robert L. (1991). "Introduction: The Turko-Persian tradition". In Canfield, Robert L. (ed.). Turko-Persia in Historical Perspective. Cambridge University Press. pp. 1–34. ISBN 0 521 52291 9.
- Crane, H. (1993). "Notes on Saldjūq Architectural Patronage in Thirteenth Century Anatolia". Journal of the Economic and Social History of the Orient. 36 (1): 1–57. doi:10.1163/156852093X00010.
- Crane, Henry; Korn, Lorenz (2017). "Turco-Persian Empires between Anatolia and India". In Flood, Finbarr Barry; Necipoglu, Gulru (eds.). A Companion to Islamic Art and Architecture. John Wiley & Sons, Inc. pp. 327–355.
- Ettinghausen, Richard (1977). Arab painting. Rizzoli International Publications, Inc. ISBN 978-0-8478-0081-0.
- Everett-Heath, John (2018). "Anatolia". The Concise Dictionary of World Place-Names. Vol. 1. Oxford University Press. doi:10.1093/acref/9780191866326.001.0001. ISBN 978-0191866326.
- Frankopan, Peter (2013). The First Crusade: The call from the East. London: Vintage. ISBN 9780099555032.
- Grousset, Rene (1931). Civilizations of the East. Hamish Hamilton. p. 252. "At the court of Konia, in fact, Persian culture reigned supreme, as is proved by the very names of the sultans -- Kaikhosrau, KaiKā'ūs, Kaiqubūd--which were borrowed from Iranian epic..."
- Grousset, Rene (1970). The Empire of the Steppes: A History of Central Asia. Rutgers University Press.
- Hickman, Bill; Leiser, Gary (2016). Turkish Language, Literature, and History: Travelers' Tales, Sultans, and Scholars Since the Eighth Century. Routledge.
- Hillenbrand, Carole (2020). "What is Special about Seljuq History?". In Canby, Sheila; Beyazit, Deniz; Rugiadi, Martina (eds.). The Seljuqs and their Successors: Art, Culture and History. Edinburgh University Press. pp. 6–16. ISBN 978-1474450348.
- Hillenbrand, Carole (2021). The Medieval Turks: Collected Essays. Edinburgh University Press. ISBN 978-1474485944.
- Hillenbrand, Robert (1994). The Art of the Saljūqs in Iran and Anatolia: Proceedings of a Symposium Held in Edinburgh in 1982. Islamic art and architecture; v. 4. Costa Mesa, California: Mazda Publishers. ISBN 0-939214-55-5. LCCN 94010037. OCLC 30071085.
- Inalcik, Halil (2008). "The Origins of Classical Ottoman Literature: Persian Tradition, Court Entertainments, and Court Poets". Journal of Turkish Literature (5). Translated by Sheridan, Michael D. Bilkent University Centure for Turkish Literature: 5–76.
- Itzkowitz, Norman (1980). Ottoman Empire and Islamic Tradition. University of Chicago Press. ISBN 978-0226388069.
- Kastritsis, Dimitris (2013). "The Historical Epic "Ahval-i Sultan Mehemmed" (The Tales of Sultan Mehmed) in the Context of Early Ottoman Historiography". Writing History at the Ottoman Court: Editing the Past, Fashioning the Future. Indiana University Press.
- Kazhdan, Alexander (1991). "Rūm". The Oxford Dictionary of Byzantium. Vol. 3. Oxford University Press.
- Khanbaghi, Aptin (2016). "Champions of the Persian Language: The Mongols or the Turks?". In De Nicola, Bruno; Melville, Charles (eds.). The Mongols' Middle East: Continuity and Transformation in Ilkhanid Iran. Brill.
- Köprülü, Mehmet Fuat (1992). The Origins of the Ottoman Empire. State University of New York Press. ISBN 978-0-7914-0819-3.
- Köprülü, Mehmed Fuad (2006). Early Mystics in Turkish Literature.
- Lewis, Bernard (1963). Istanbul and the Civilization of the Ottoman Empire. University of Oklahoma Press.
- Lewis, Franklin D. (2014). Rumi: Past and Present, East and West. Oneworld Publications.
- McCarthy, Justin (2014). The Ottoman Turks: An Introductory History to 1923. Taylor & Francis.
- Mecit, Songul (2013). The Rum Seljuqs: Evolution of a Dynasty. Taylor & Francis.
- Mikaberidze, Alexander (2015). "Basian, Battle of (1202)". Historical Dictionary of Georgia. Rowman & Littlefield.
- Morton, Nicholas (2016). Encountering Islam on the First Crusade. Cambridge University Press.
- Ocak, Ahmet Yaşar (2010). "Social, cultural and intellectual life, 1071–1453". In Fleet, Kate (ed.). The Cambridge History of Turkey, Volume 1: Byzantium to Turkey, 1071–1453 (PDF). Vol. 1. Cambridge University Press. p. 354.
- Ölçer, Nazan (2005). "The Seljuks and Artuqids of Medieval Anatolia: The Anatolia Seljuks". In Roxburgh, David (ed.). Turks: A journey of a Thousand Years, 600-1600. London : New York: Royal Academy of Arts. pp. 102–145. ISBN 978-1903973578.
- Oney, Gonul (1980). Akurgal, Ekrem (ed.). The Art and architecture of Turkey. Rizzoli. p. 178 note on plate 119, Plate 119. ISBN 978-0-8478-0273-9. "Page 178 Plate 119: "Throne scene on a star-shaped tile, Iranian-Seljuk minai technique, Alaeddin Palace, Konya, 1156—92 (Kilicarslan II period), D. 8.5 cm. The sultan, sitting cross-legged on his throne, is holding a pomegranate in one hand; there are tiraz bands on his arms and two guards next to him. Karatay Madrasah Museum, Konya."
- Özaydın, Abdülkerim (2020). "Büyük Selçuklular'ın Hizmetinde Bir Aile: Porsukoğulları". Tarih Dergisi (71): 95. doi:10.26650/TurkJHist.2020.007.
- Pamuk, Sevket (2000). A Monetary History of the Ottoman Empire. Cambridge University Press.
- Peacock, A.C.S. (2006). "The Saliūq Campaign against the Crimea and the Expansionist Policy of the Early Reign of'Alā' al-Dīn Kayqubād". Journal of the Royal Asiatic Society. 16 (2): 133–149.
- Peacock, A.C.S.; Yildiz, Sara Nur (2015). The Seljuks of Anatolia: Court and Society in the Medieval Middle East. I.B. Tauris.
- Peacock, A. C. S. (2025). "Byzantium, Rum, and the bilad al-Islam". In Shepard, Jonathan; Frankopan, Peter (eds.). Revisiting the Byzantine Commonwealth: Nodes, Networks, and Spheres. Oxford University Press. pp. 361–376. ISBN 978-0198864097.
- Petersen, Andrew (2002). "Konya (Byzantine:Iconium)". Dictionary of Islamic Architecture. Taylor & Francis.
- Richards, Donald S.; Robinson, Chase F. (2003). Texts, documents, and Artefacts. Brill.
- Ring, Trudy; Watson, Noelle; Schellinger, Paul, eds. (1995). Southern Europe: International Dictionary of Historic Places. Vol. 3. Routledge.
- Saunders, John Joseph (1971). The History of the Mongol Conquests. University of Pennsylvania Press.
- Shukurov, Rustam (2016). The Byzantine Turks, 1204–1461. Brill.
- Shukurov, Rustam (2020). "Grasping the Magnitude: Saljuq Rum between Byzantium and Persia". In Canby, Sheila; Beyazit, Deniz; Rugiadi, Martina (eds.). The Seljuqs and their Successors: Art, Culture and History. Edinburgh University Press. pp. 144–162. ISBN 978-1474450348.
- Shaw, Stanford J.; Shaw, Ezel Kural (1976). History of the Ottoman Empire and Modern Turkey: Volume 1, Empire of the Gazis: The Rise and Decline of the Ottoman Empire 1280-1808. Cambridge University Press. p. 7. ISBN 978-0-521-29163-7.
- Sicker, Martin (2000). The Islamic world in ascendancy: from the Arab conquests to the siege of Vienna. Westport, Conn: Praeger. ISBN 9780275968922.
- Sinclair, Thomas (2020). Eastern Trade and the Mediterranean in the Middle Ages: Pegolotti's Ayas. Routledge. ISBN 9781000752670.
- Tricht, Filip Van (2011). The Latin Renovatio of Byzantium: The Empire of Constantinople (1204–1228). Translated by Longbottom, Peter. Brill.
- Turan, Osman (1995). "Anatolia in the period of the Seljuks and the "beyliks"". In Holt, P.M.; Lambton, Ann K.S.; Lewis, Bernard (eds.). The Cambridge History of Islam. Vol. 1A. Cambridge University Press.
- Van Gorder, A. Christian (2010). Christianity in Persia and the Status of Non-muslims in Iran. Bloomsbury Academic.
- Wittek, Paul (2013). Rise of the Ottoman Empire, Royal Asiatic Society Books. Routledge.
