= Suleiman II of Rum =

Suleiman II
- Rukhuddin
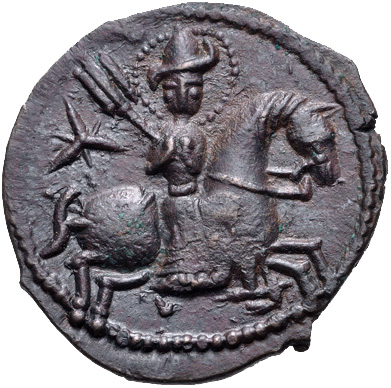
- Coinage of Suleiman II of Rum, 595 H (1198-9 CE)

Seljuq sultans of Rum
- Reign: 1196–1204
- Predecessor: Kaykhusraw I
- Successor: Kilij Arslan III
- Co-Sultan: Malik Shah II (1196–1197); Tughril Shah (1202–1204)
- Born: 1158
- Died: c. 1204 (aged 45–46)
- Issue: Kilij Arslan III
Names
- Rukn ad-Din Suleiman Shah
- Dynasty: Seljuk
- Father: Kilij Arslan II
- Religion: Sunni Islam

Suleiman II, also known as Rukn ad-Din Suleiman Shah (Arabic: رکن الدین سلیمان شاه), was the Seljuk Sultan of Rûm between 1196 and 1204.

Son of Kilij Arslan II, Suleiman overthrew his brother, Sultan Kaykhusraw I, and became sultan in 1196.

Suleiman fought neighbouring rulers and expanded the territories of the Sultanate. In 1201, he conquered Erzurum, giving it as a fief to Mughith al-Din Tugrulshah in 1202. Successful in the wars with the Byzantines, Suleiman was routed by the Georgians in the Battle of Basian of 1203.

Suleiman was succeeded by his son Kilij Arslan III in 1204–1205, after which Kaykhusraw I forced his way into Konya, removed Kilij from power and was enthroned for a second time.

== Sources ==
- Bosworth, C.E. (1996). The New Islamic Dynasties. Columbia University Press.
- Peacock, A.C.S.; Yildiz, Sara Nur (2015). The Seljuks of Anatolia: Court and Society in the Medieval Middle East. I.B. Tauris.
- Mikaberidze, Alexander, ed. (2011). "Battle of Basian (1203)". Conflict and Conquest in the Islamic World:An Historical Encyclopedia. ABC-CLIO.

| Preceded by Kaykhusraw I | Sultan of Rûm; 1196–1204 | Succeeded by Kilij Arslan III |
