= Kilij Arslan III =

Seljuq sultans of Rum
- Reign: 1204–1205
- Predecessor: Süleymanshah II
- Successor: Kaykhusraw I
- Born: 1184
- Died: 1205 (aged 20–21)
- Issue: Gawhar Khatun (daughter)
- Father: Süleymanshah II

Kilij Arslan III (Old Anatolian Turkish: قِلِج اَرسلان, Persian: قلیچ ارسلان Qilij Arslān; Modern Turkish: Kılıç Arslan, meaning "Sword Lion") was the Seljuq Sultan of Rûm for a short period between 1204 and 1205 succeeding his father Suleiman II. He was succeeded by his uncle Kaykhusraw I. Kilij Arslan had a daughter named Gawhar Khatun.

| Preceded by Süleymanshah II | Sultan of Rûm; 1204–1205 | Succeeded by Kaykhusraw I |
