= Alâeddin Mosque =

12th-century Seljuk-era mosque in Konya, Turkey

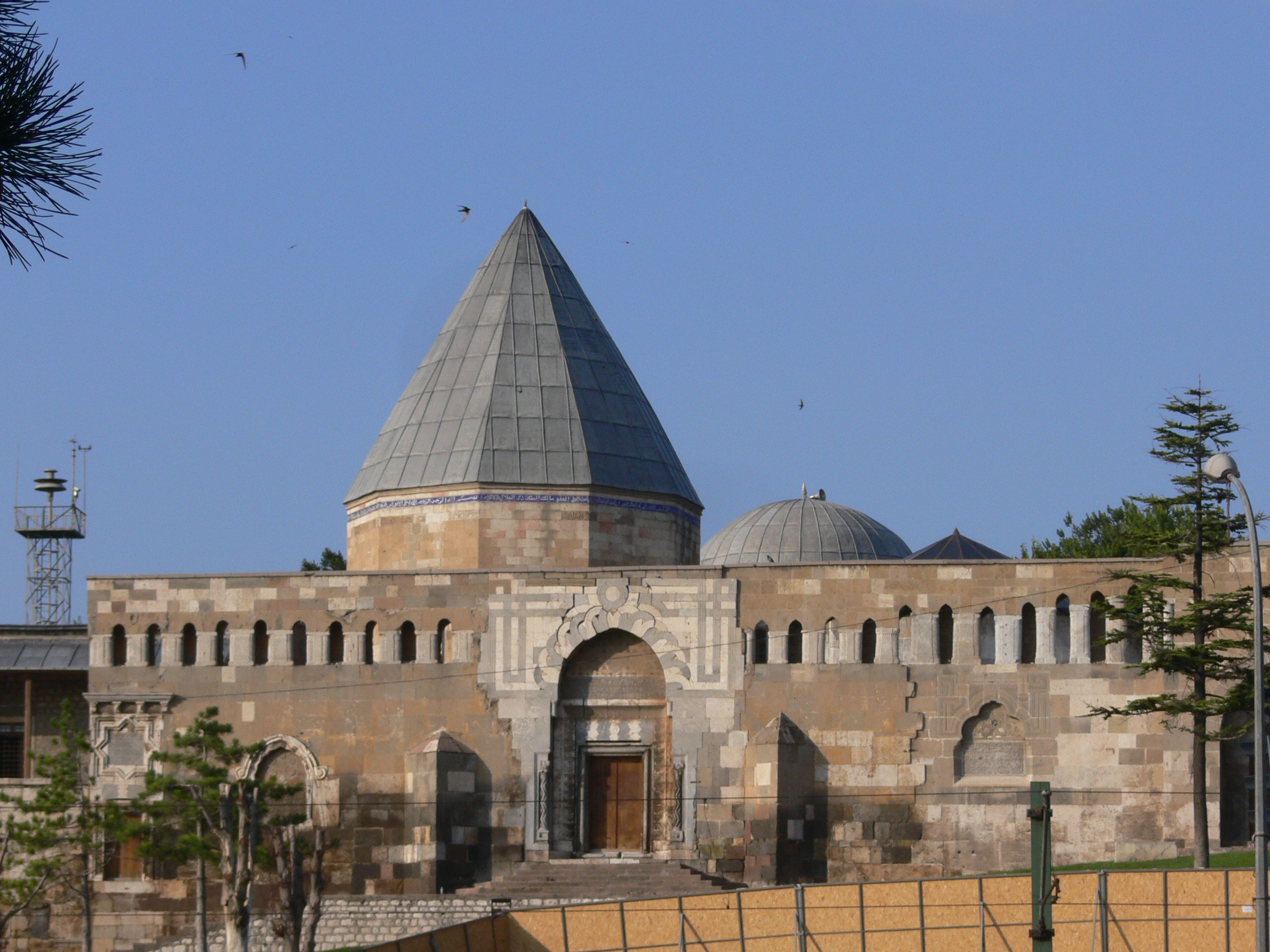
- Alâeddin Mosque at Alâeddin Tepesi (Alâeddin Hill) in Konya

Religion
- Affiliation: Islam
- Province: Konya Province
- Region: Central Anatolia
- Ecclesiastical or organisational status: Mosque

Location
- Location: Konya, Turkey
- Interactive map of Alâeddin Mosque
- Coordinates: 37°52′24.75″N 32°29′33.25″E

Architecture
- Architect: Muhammad bin Khawlan al-Dimashqi
- Type: Mosque
- Style: Seljuk
- Completed: 1235

Specifications
- Direction of façade: North
- Length: 56 m
- Width: 71 m
- Minaret: 1

The Alâeddin Mosque (Turkish: Alâeddin Camii) is the principal monument on Alaaddin Hill (Alaadin Tepesi) in the centre of Konya, Turkey. Part of the hilltop citadel complex that contained the Seljuk Palace, it served as the main prayer hall for the Seljuk Sultans of Rum and its courtyard contains the burial places of several of the sultans. It was constructed in stages between the mid-12th and mid-13th centuries. It is the largest of several Seljuk mosques to survive in Konya.

Both the mosque and the hill it stands on are named after the Seljuk Sultan Alaaddin Keykubad I (Alaaddin Tepesi and Alaaddin Camii). The mosque exhibits a distinctive application of Syrian Ablaq design, reflecting the influence of its architect, Muhammad bin Khawlan al-Dimashqi, who hailed from Damascus.

== History ==
=== Alaeddin Hill ===
The Alâeddin Hill was known as Kawania and Kaoania Hill in antiquity. The Eflatun Mescidi, the converted Byzantine church of Ayios Amphilochios, used to share the hill with the mosque before the 1920s. The Alaaddin Mosque itself was likely built on the site of a former Christian basilica, a hypothesis supported by 20th-century excavations and by the ancient spolia re-used inside the mosque. The complex lies near the artificial city mound where the ancient acropolis of the city once stood.

=== The Mosque ===
The Seljuk Sultan Mesud I began work on the mosque in 1155. An inscription dates the fine ebony minbar to 1155, making it the first dated example of Seljuk art in Anatolia. The polychrome ceramic frame of the mihrab and the dome above it may also date from this period. The eastern wing of the mosque, its pillars constructed with re-used Byzantine columns and capitals, is unusually open and spacious.

Mesud I's son Kılıçarslan II continued his father's work on the mosque. In 1219 Kaykaus I began a major rebuilding programme, moving the main entrance from the west to the north, opposite the mihrab, and adding a monumental façade on the north side, overlooking the city and facing the Seljuk palace. A marble tomb was begun in the courtyard. Kaykaus' building work was cut short by his death in the same year, only to be resumed by his brother and successor Alaaddin Keykubad I, Keykubad had several of his brother's inscriptions altered and claimed all the improvements to the mosque for himself. In 1235 he added a large room, supported by forty-two columns, to the east of the mihrab. The mosque now takes its name from Keykubad. Keykubad further built a protective structure around the mosque and the palace, the Konya citadel.

The minaret, the marble mihrab (1891) and the eastern door, through which most visitors enter the mosque, date from the Ottoman period.

The courtyard of the mosque contains two typically Seljuk tombs (kümbets), one built by Kilicarslan II and still retaining some blue tiles on its roof. The base of the roof of one of the tombs carries the throne verse from the Qur'an.

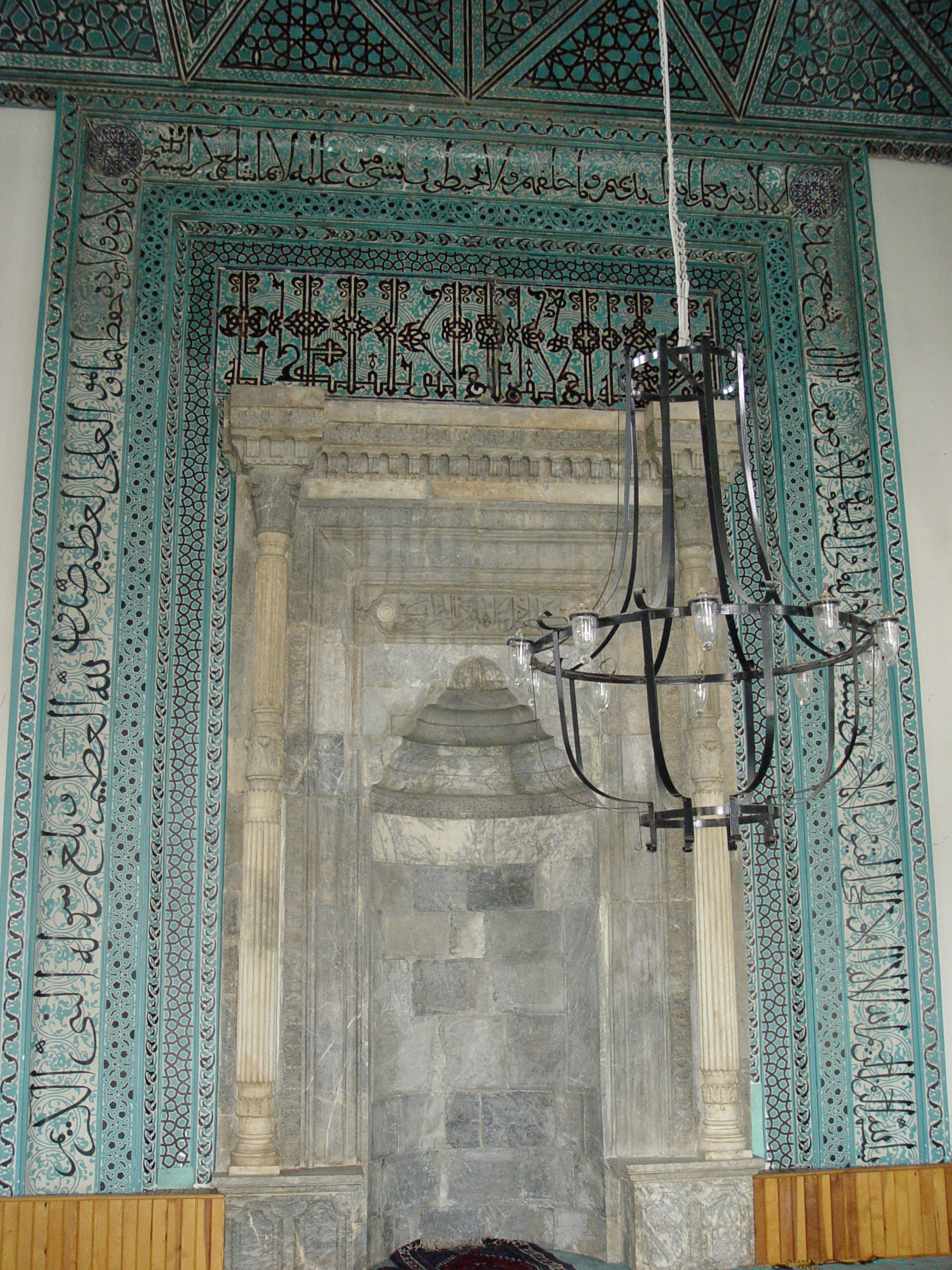
The blue tilework and ablaq technique seen on the exterior portion of the mosque extends into its interior, as seen on its mihrab.

=== Inscriptions ===
Over the main entrance to the mosque an inscription attributes its completion to Sultan Alaaddin Keykubad I in the year 617 H (1220–1221). To the right another inscription credits the same sultan as responsible for both the mosque and the tombs. Another inscription mentions the Syrian craftsman Muhammad ben Khaulan of Damascus. Inscriptions on the façade also show the names of Alaaddin, Izzeddin Keykavus, and the Atabeg who was responsible for work on the mosque during both Alaaddin's and Izzeddin's reigns. Izzeddin was responsible for constructing the main prayer hall of the mosque.

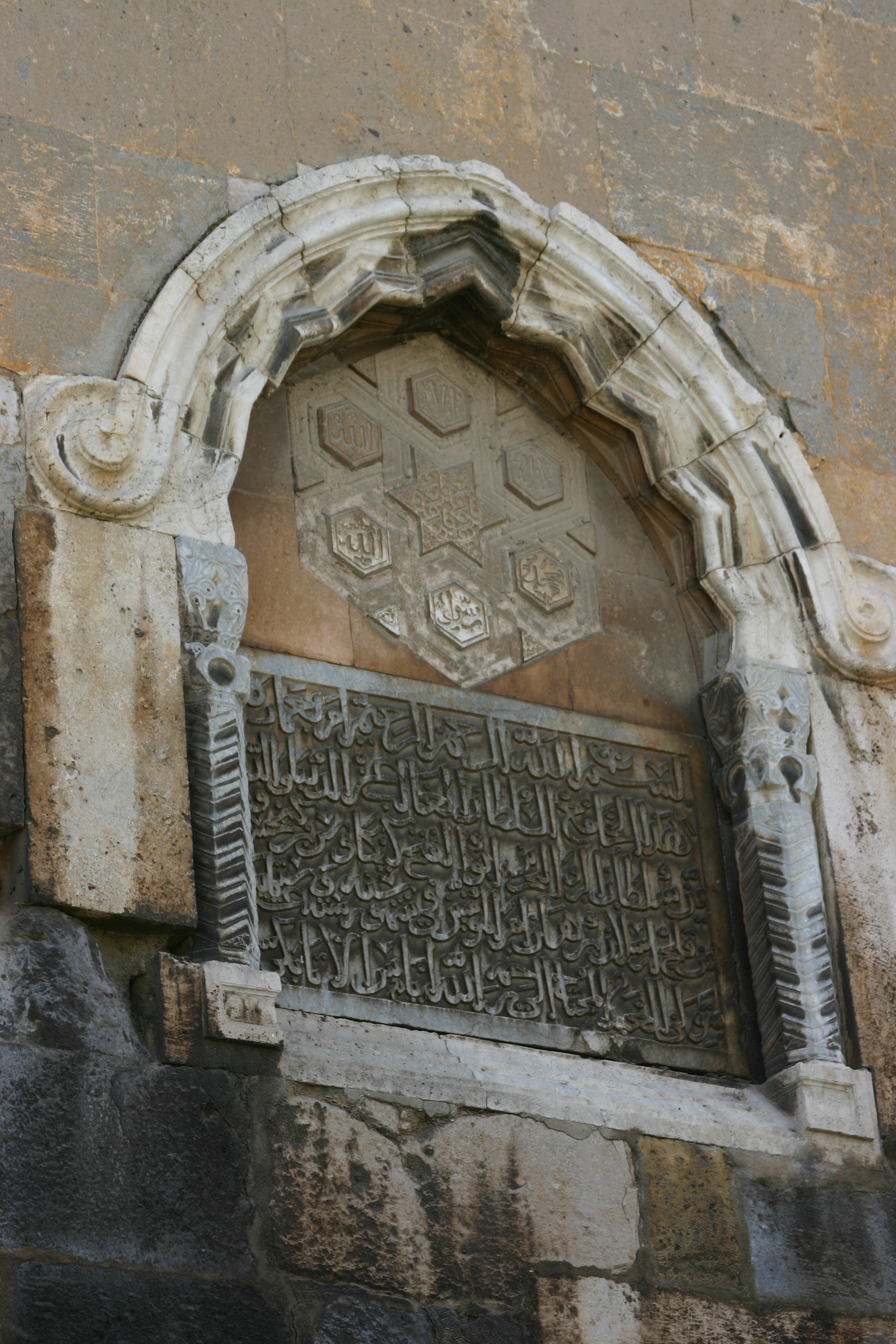
Inscriptions on the facade of the mosque.

== Tombs of the Seljuk Sultans ==
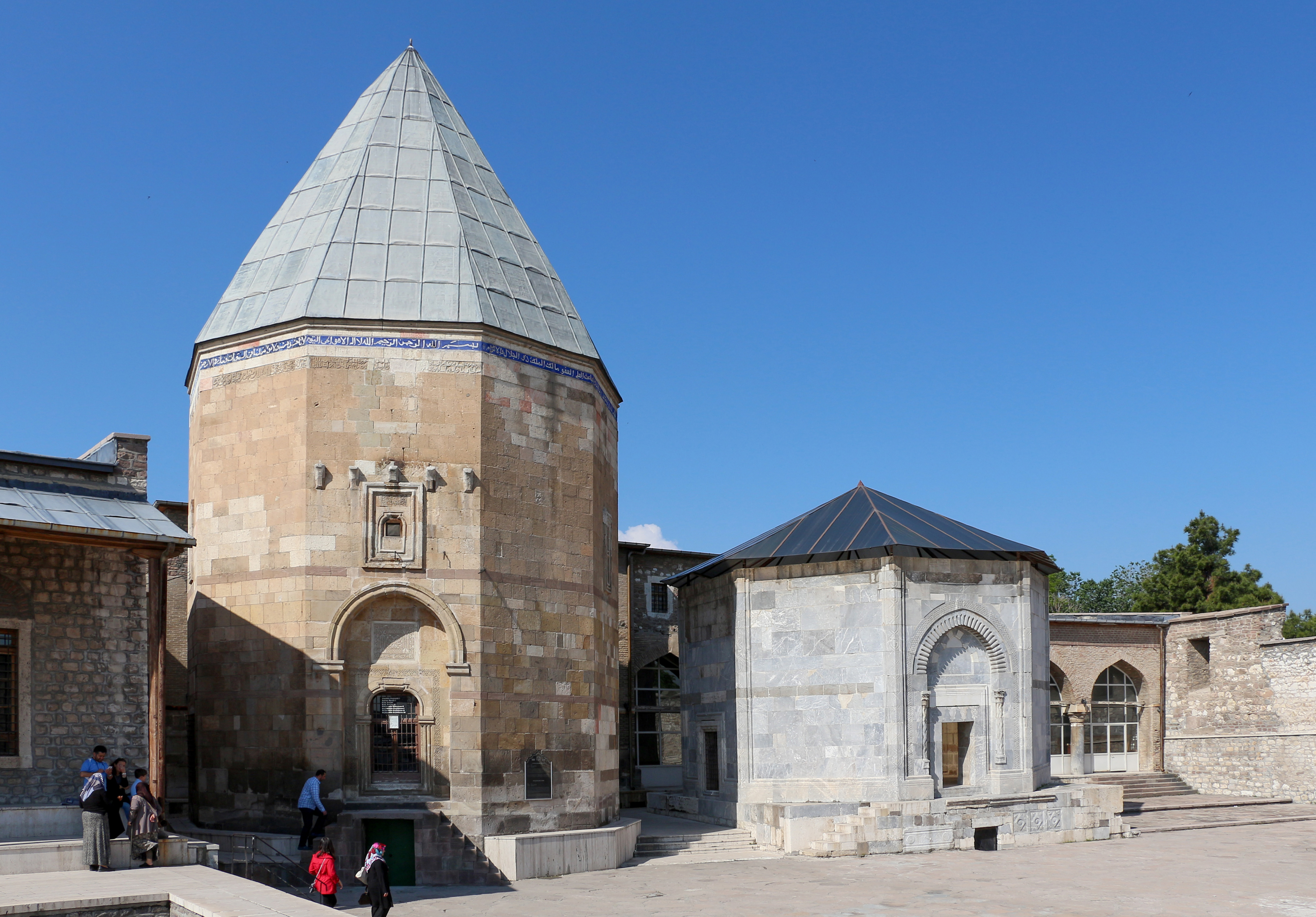
Mausolea of the sultans in the courtyard of Alaaddin Mosque

The courtyard of the Alaeddin Mosque contains two monumental mausolea, known as türbe or kümbets. According to an inscription on its façade, Kilijçarslan II commissioned a ten-sided tomb with a conical roof which became the burial place of the Seljuk dynasty, housing the sarcophagi of eight of the Seljuk Sultans of Rum:

- Rukneddin Mesud I (d. 1156)
- Izzeddin Kiliçarslan II (d. 1196)
- Suleiman Shah (d. 1204)
- Gıyaseddin Kayhusrew I (d. 1210)
- Alaaddin Keykubad I (d. 1237)
- Gıyaseddin Kayhusrew II (d. 1246)
- Rukneddin Kiliçarslan IV (d. 1266)
- Gıyaseddin Kayhusrew III (d. 1283).

A second octagonal mausoleum was begun by Kaykaus I but was still unfinished at the time of his death in 1219. This unfinished marble mausoleum is known as the Adsız Türbe, or the "Nameless Mausoleum," since the names of the 4 people buried inside it are unknown.

== Recent history ==
In 1945, the mosque was administered by the Ministry of Education which converted it into a museum along with the Karatay Madresesi. Until 1951, the mosque was administered by the General Directorate of Pious Endowments (Vakıflar Genel Müdürlüğü). In 1952 the museum became a mosque again but disputes over its status continued because the courtyard was now owned by General Directorate of Antiquities and Museums (Eski Eserler ve Müzeler Genel Müdürlüğü).

=== Restoration ===
During the Second World War the mosque was used for storing army equipment. No attempt was made to restore it until after the end of the War. During a four-year restoration process lead sheets and heavy concrete slabs with waterproof layering were laid over the dome of the western section.

In 2014 work began on a complete restoration of the mosque as part of a wider project to restore the remaining traces of the old Seljuk palace. By 2020 the work was almost complete.

== See also ==
- Konya citadel
- Kubadabad Palace
- Saint Amphilochius (Konya)
- Karatay Medrese, Konya
- Ince Minaret Medrese, Konya
- List of Turkish Grand Mosques

== Gallery ==
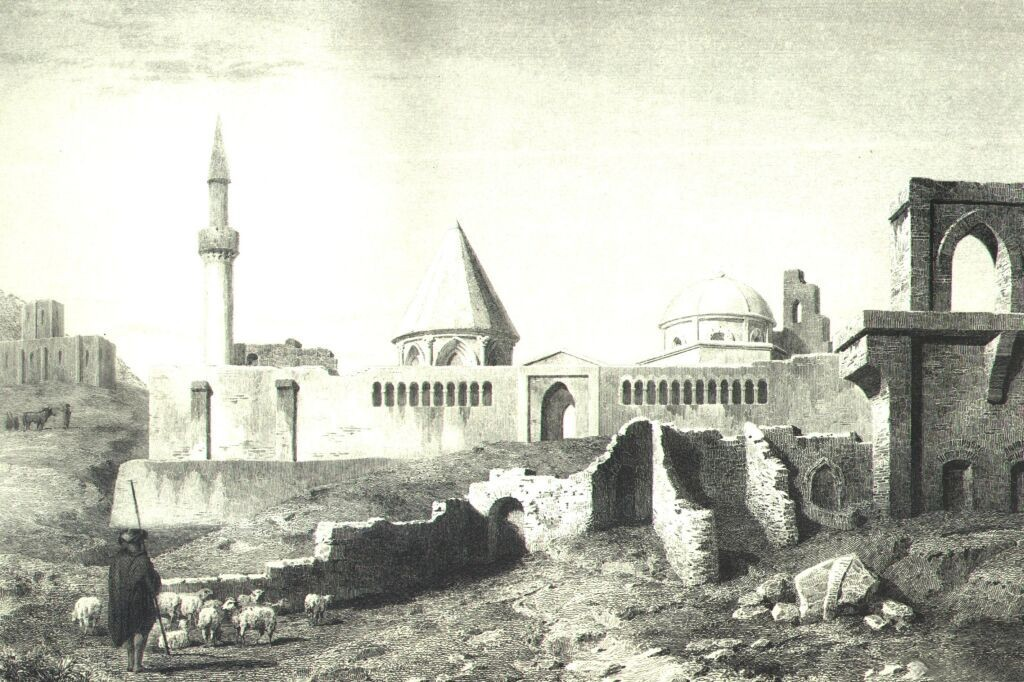
Alaaddin Mosque in an engraving of 1849

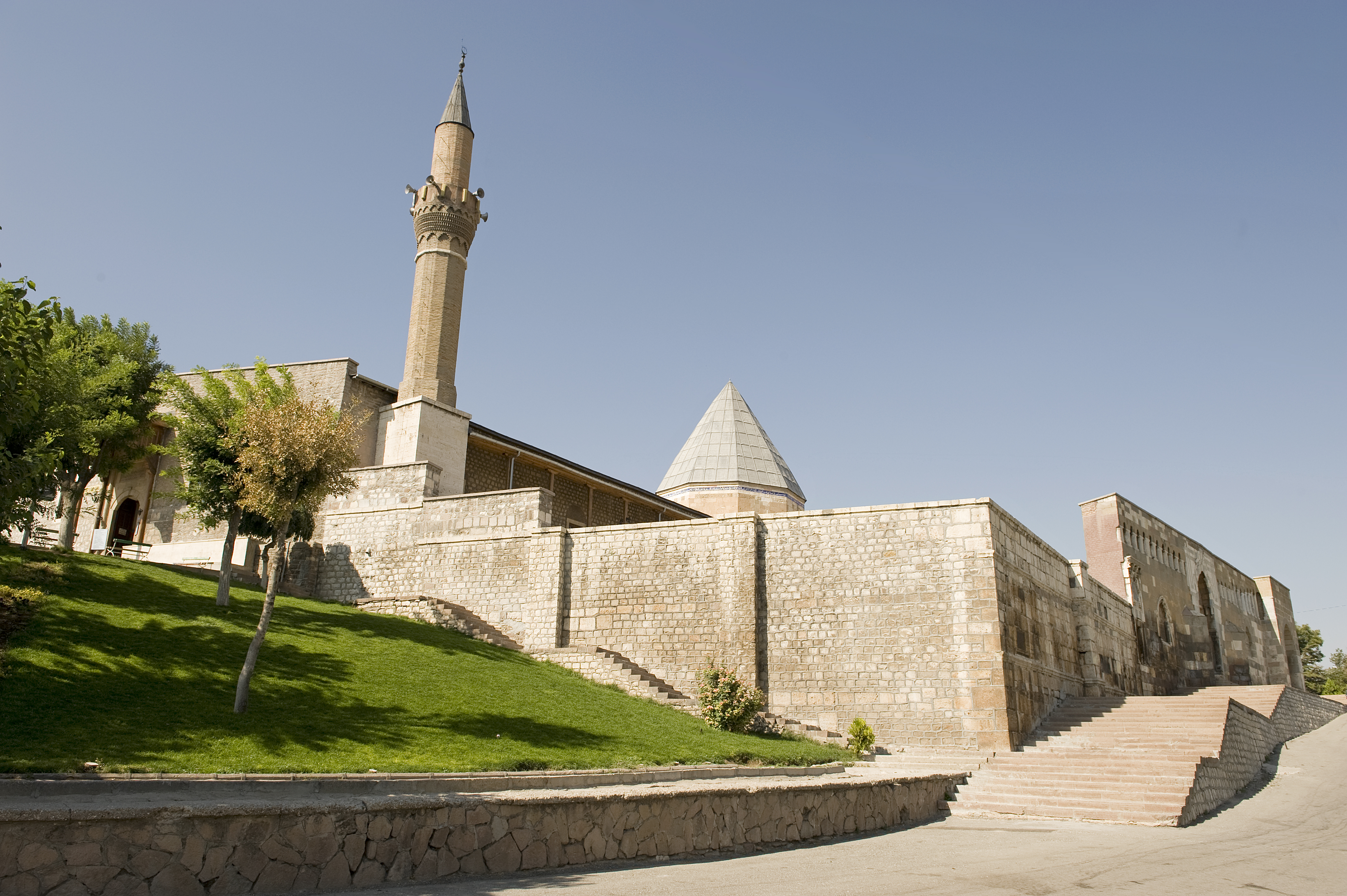
Alaeddin Mosque from the side

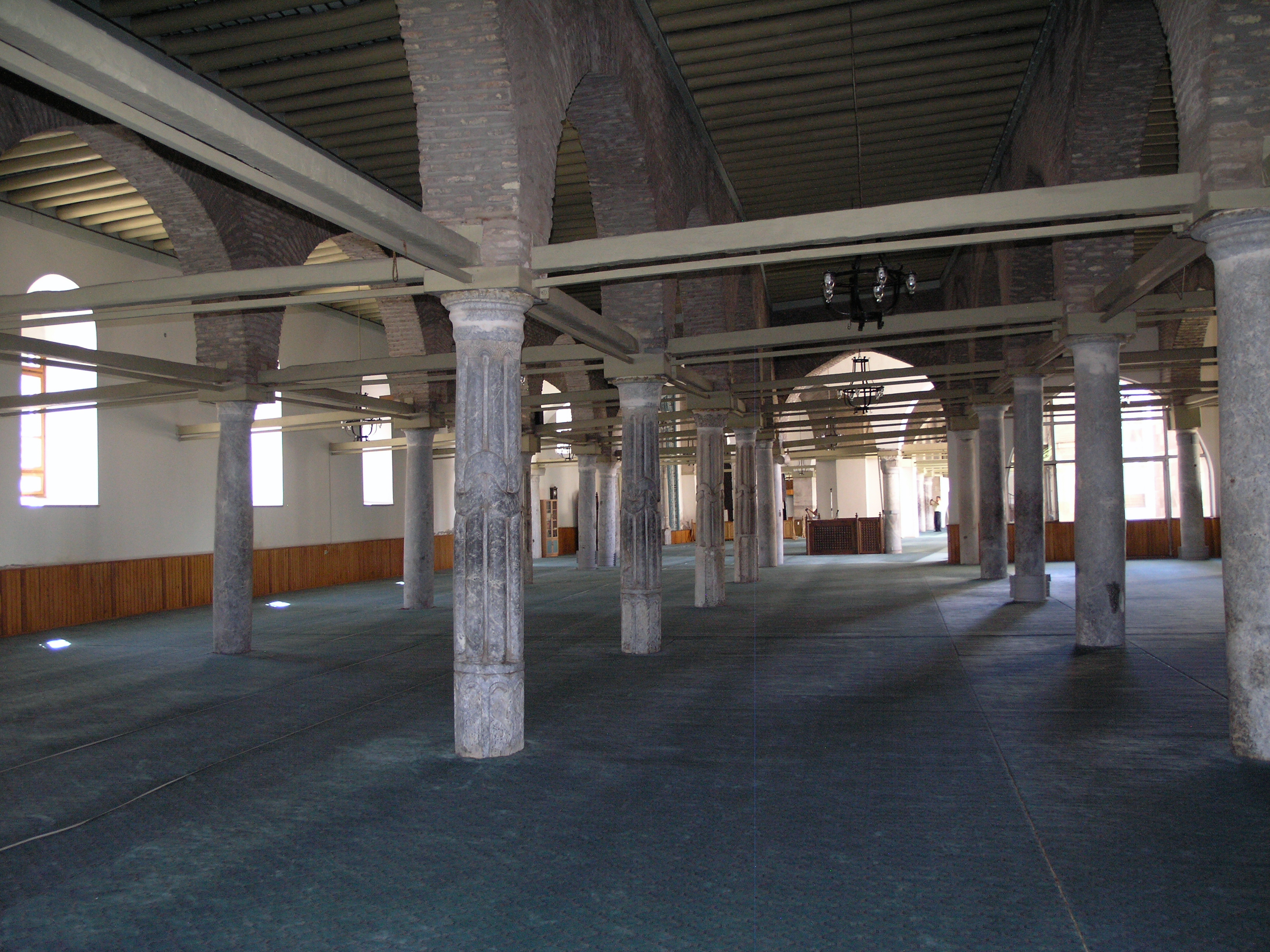
Prayer hall of the mosque

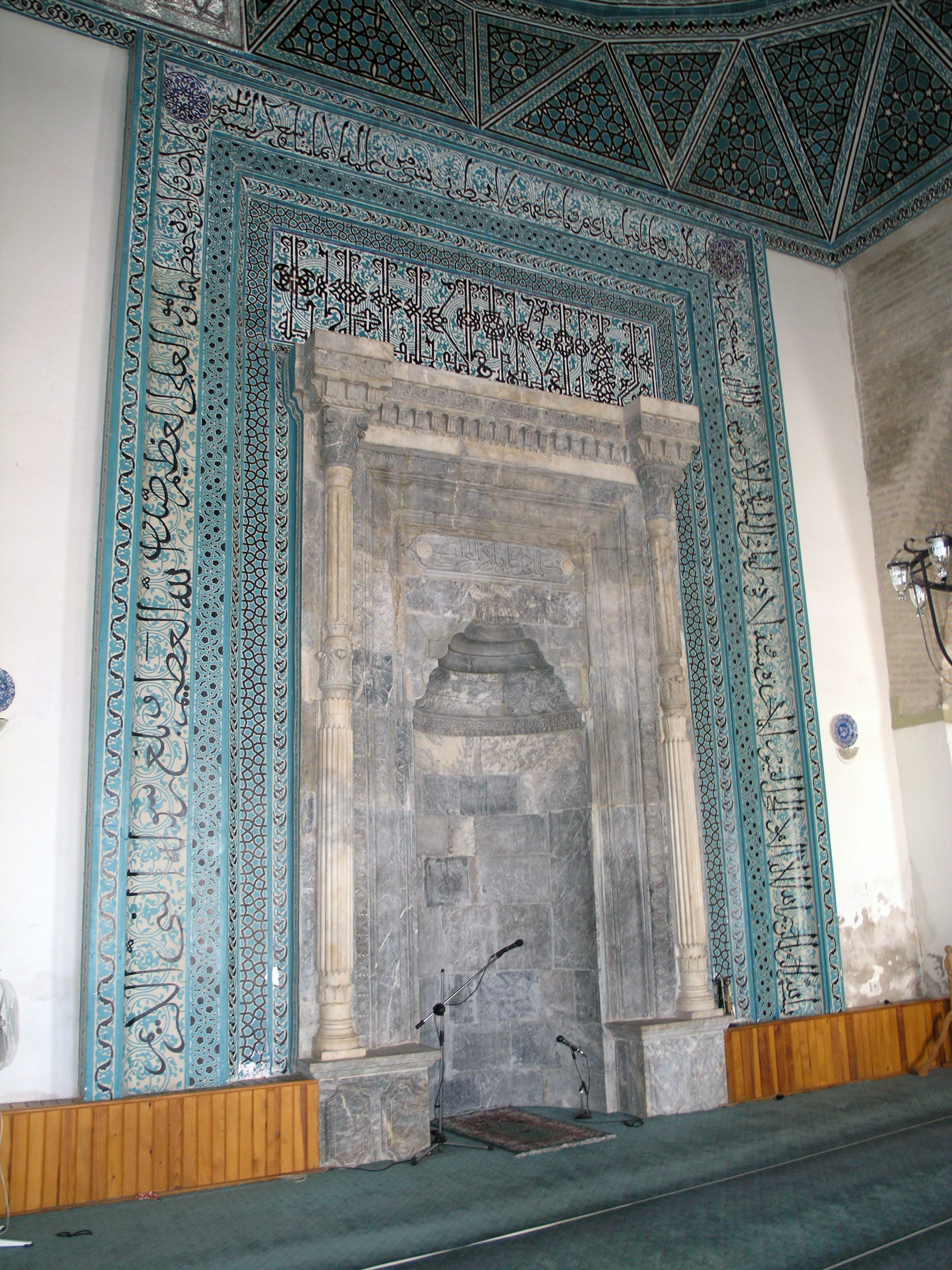
Mihrab

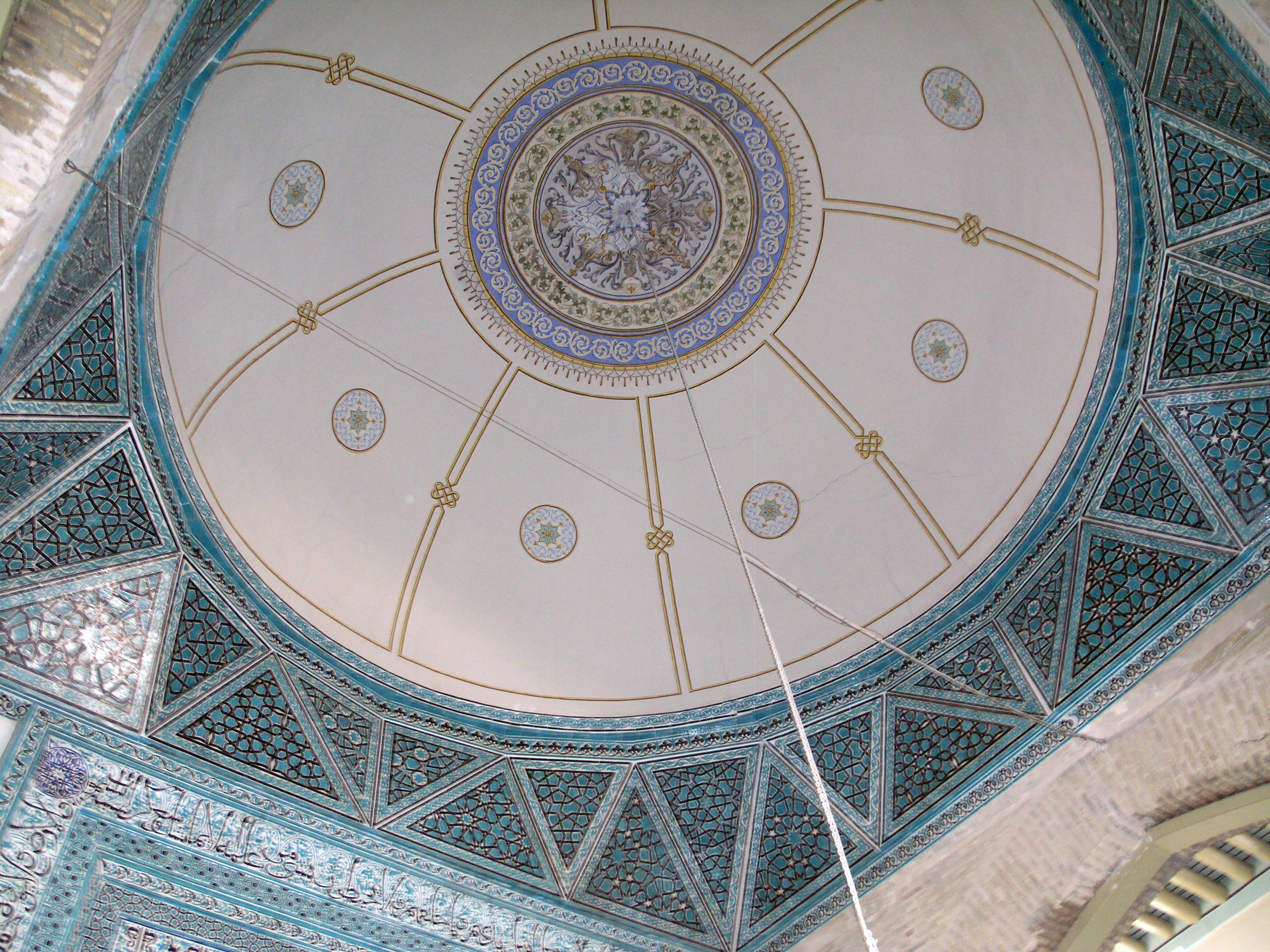
Dome

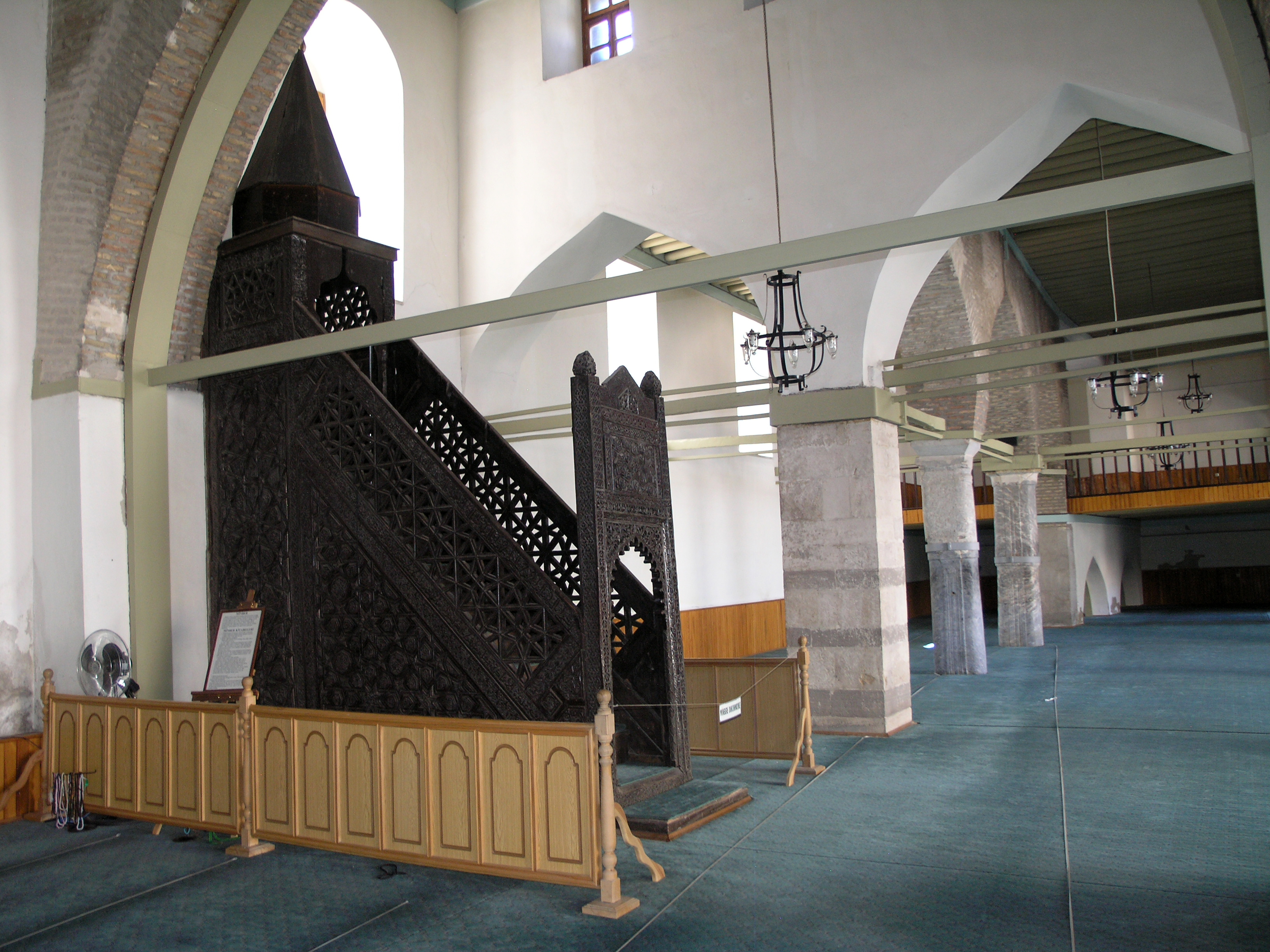
Minbar

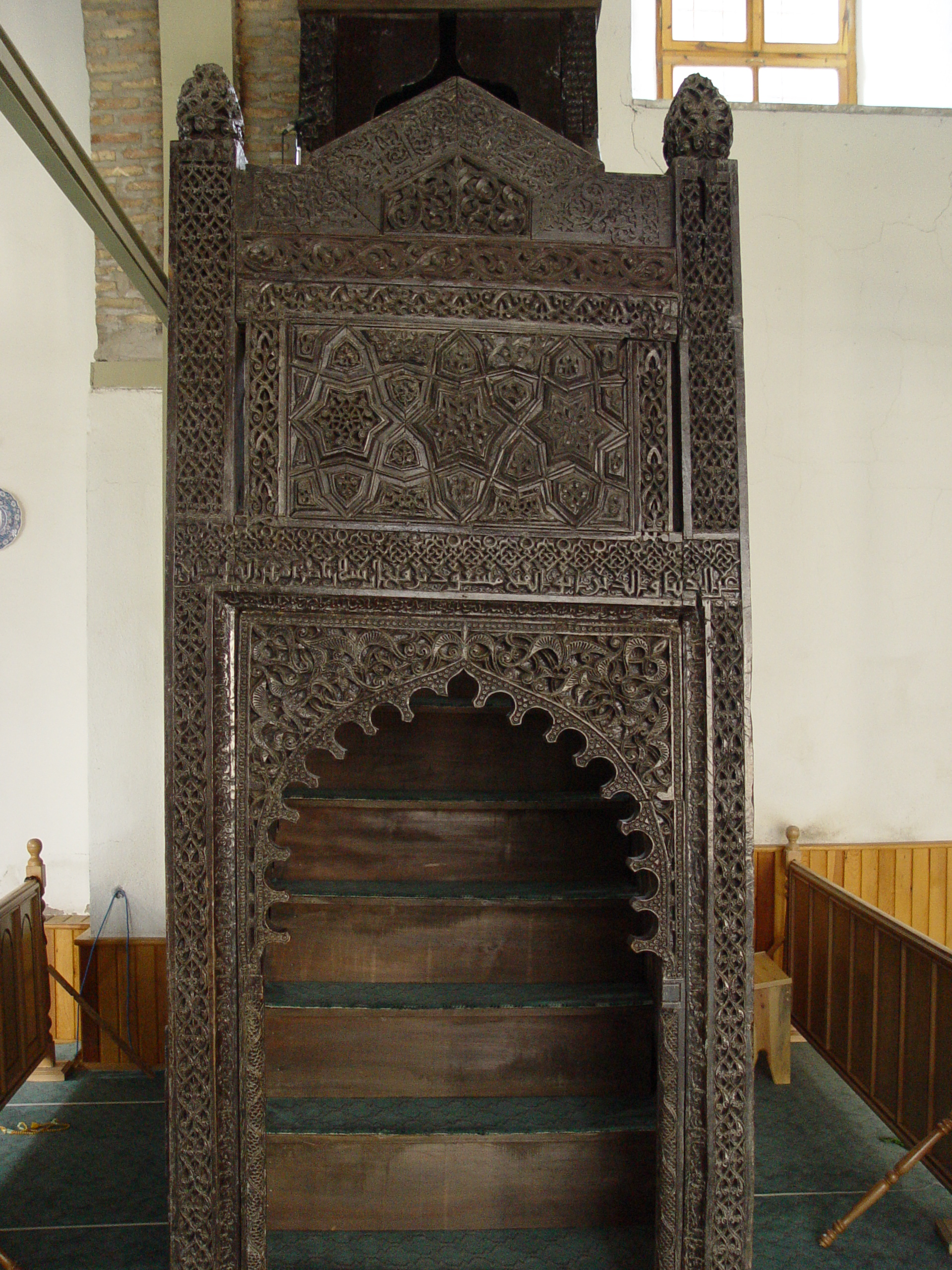
Alaaddin Mosque Minber

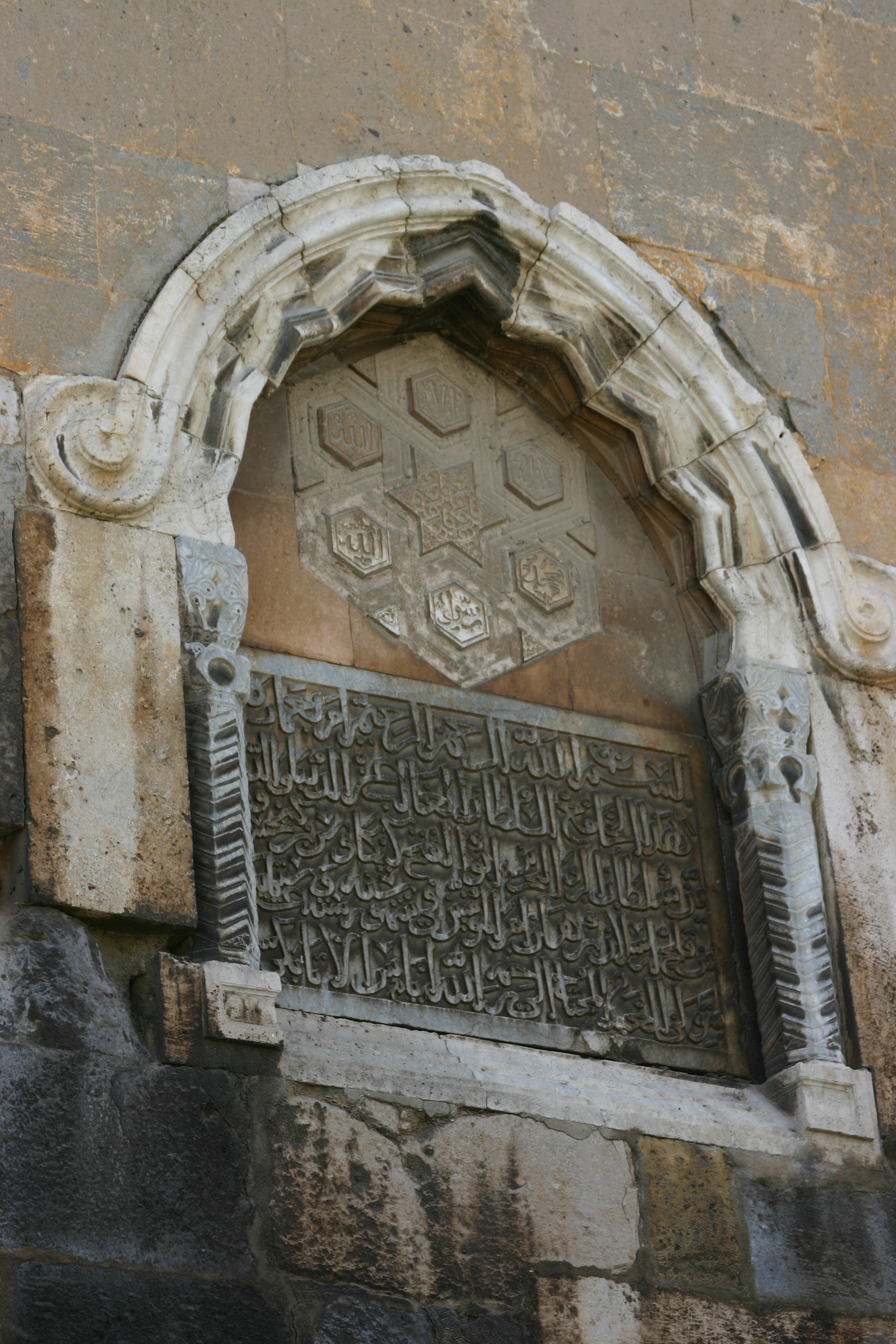
Inscription

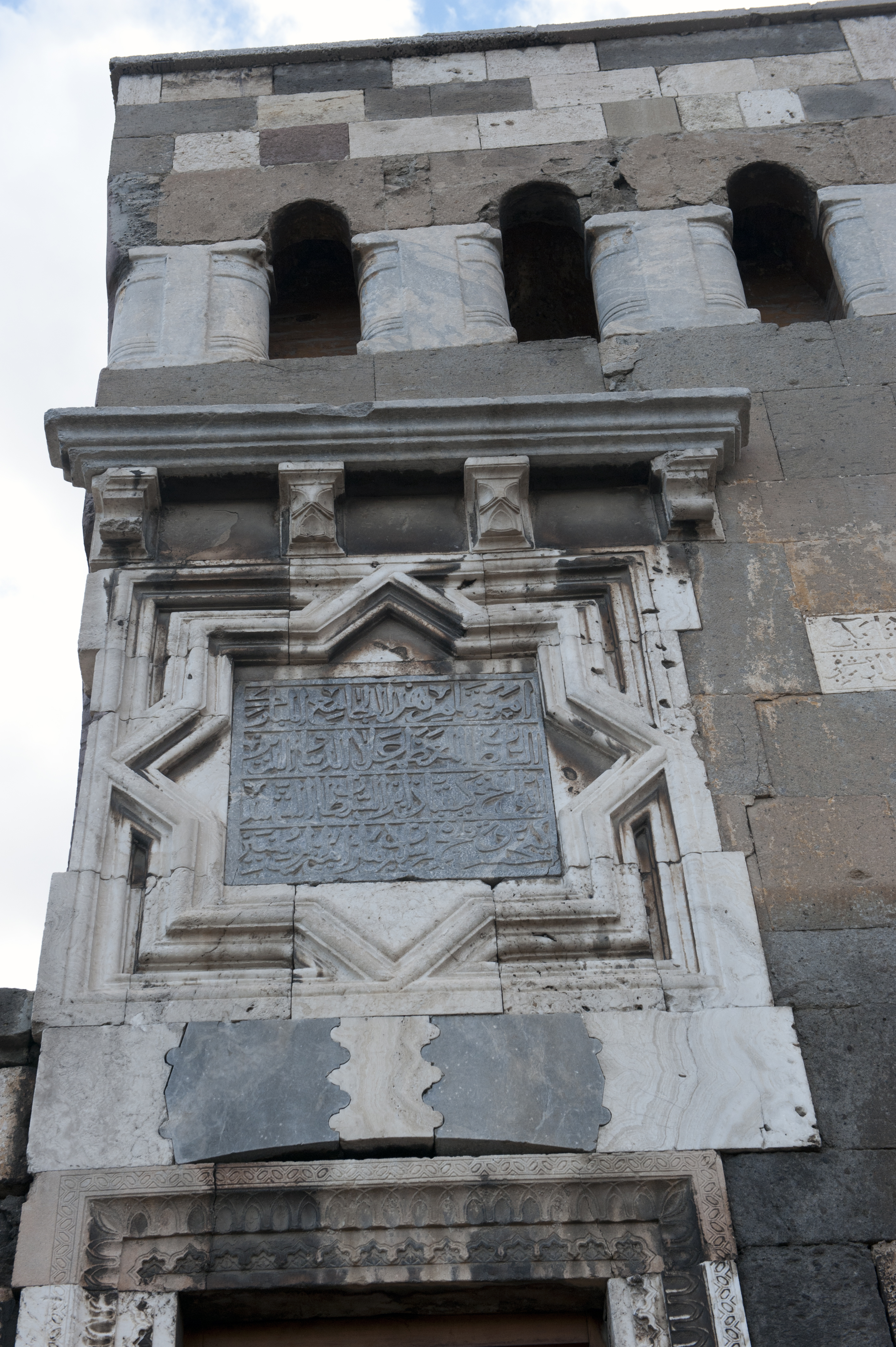
Inscription on Alaaddin Mosque

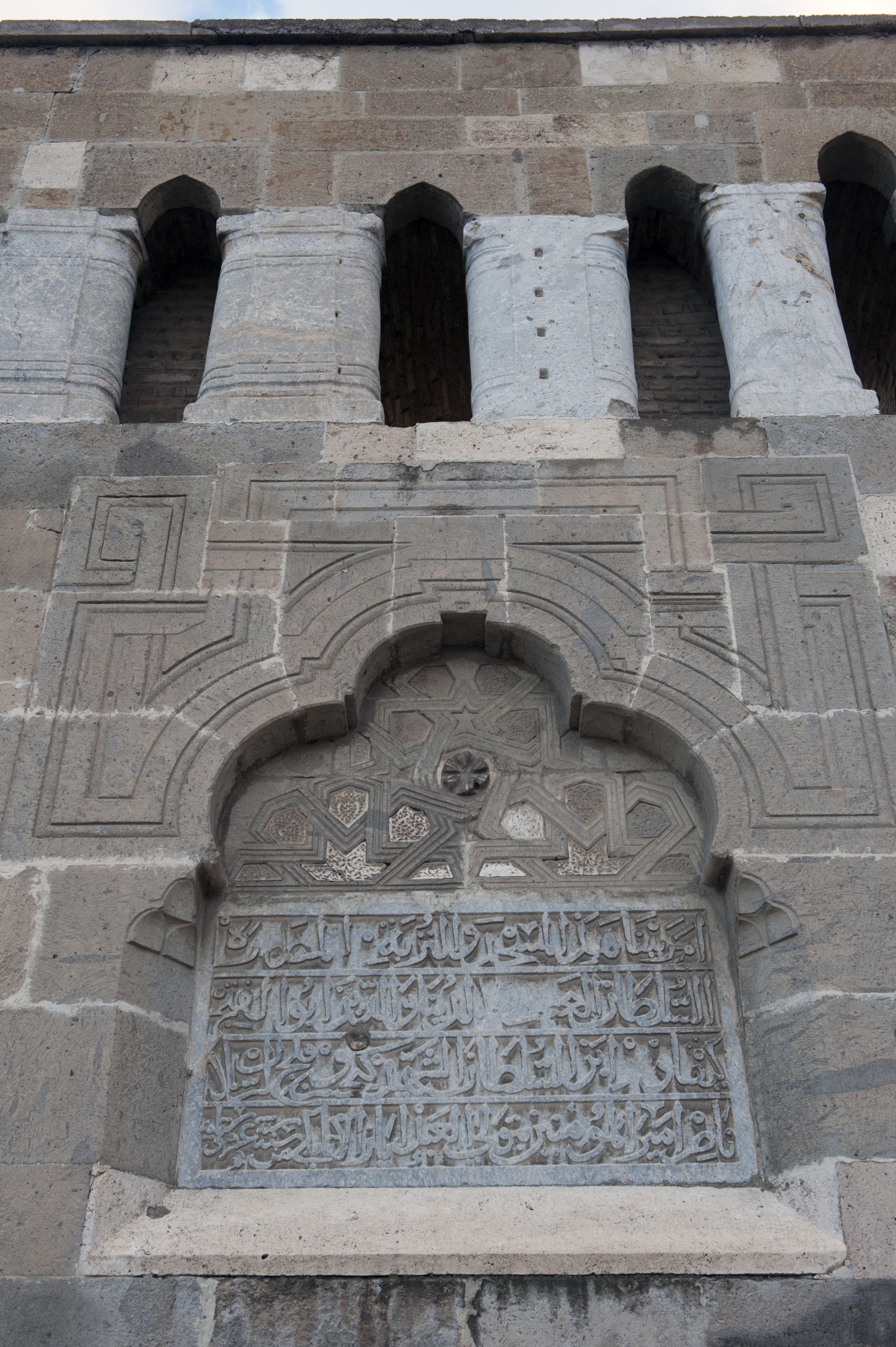
Inscription on Alaaddin Mosque

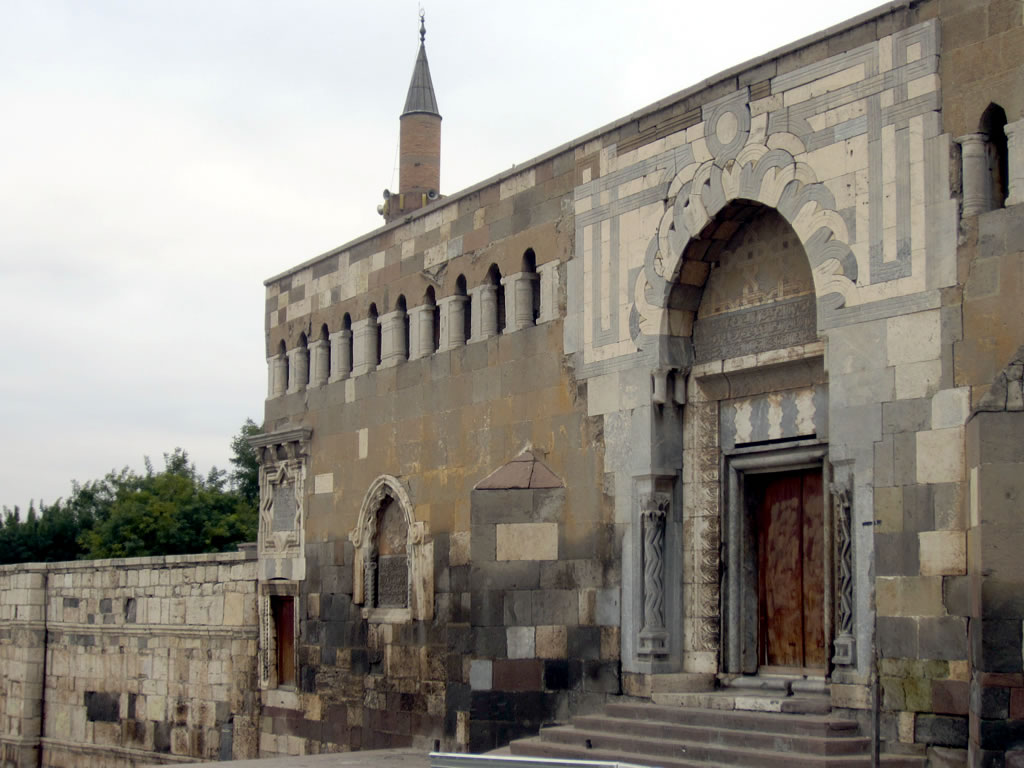
Main entrance to Alaaddin Mosque

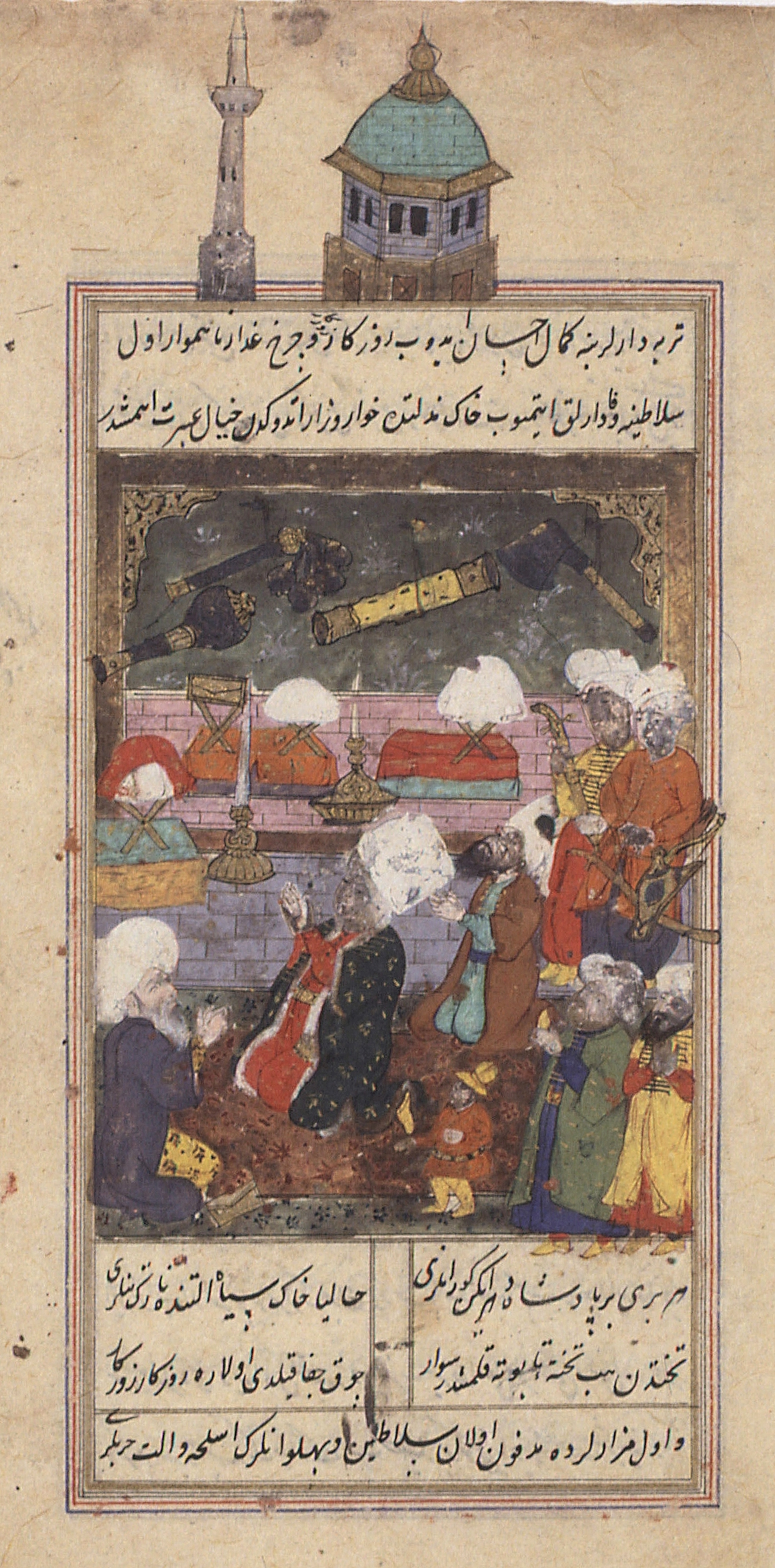
Hadim Yusuf Paşa visiting the tombs of Rum Seljuq rulers in Konya, circa 1602

== Sources ==
- Redford, Scott (1991). "The Alâeddin Mosque in Konya Reconsidered". Artibus Asiae. 51 (1/2). Zürich: Artibus Asiae Publishers: 54–74. doi:10.2307/3249676. ISSN 0004-3648. JSTOR 3249676.
