= Léon de Laborde =

French politician, diplomat and archaeologist (1807–1869)

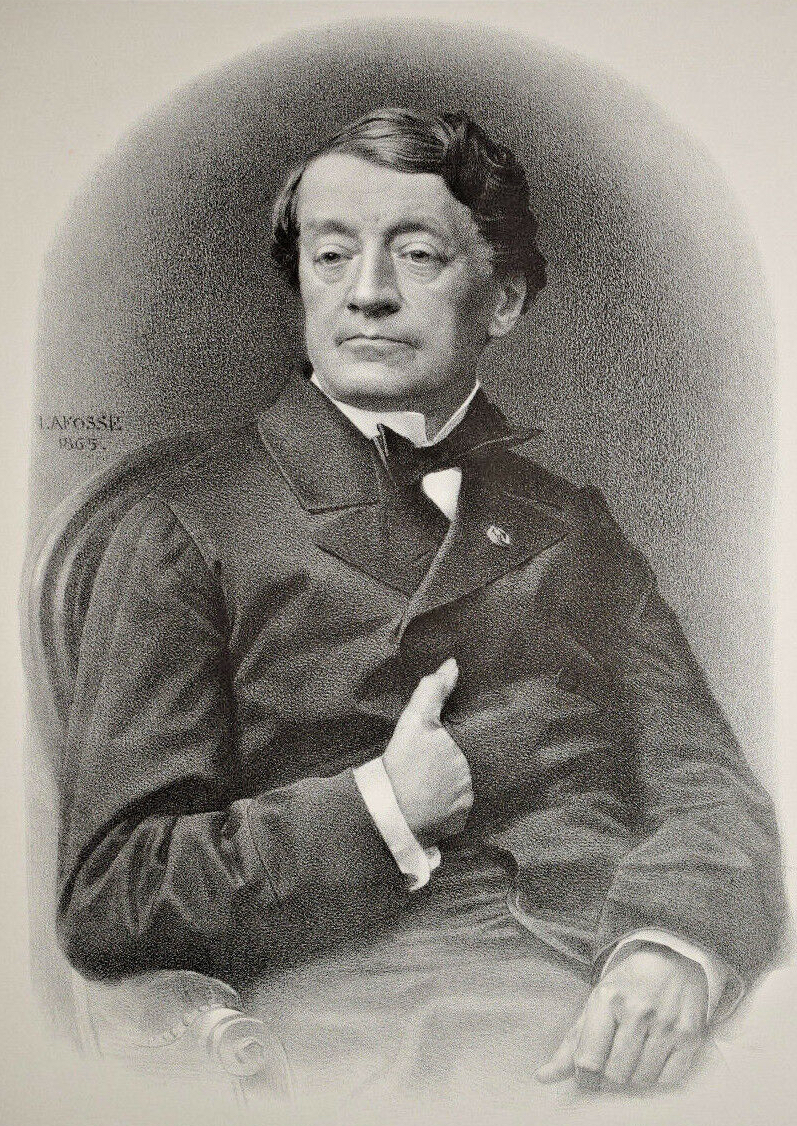

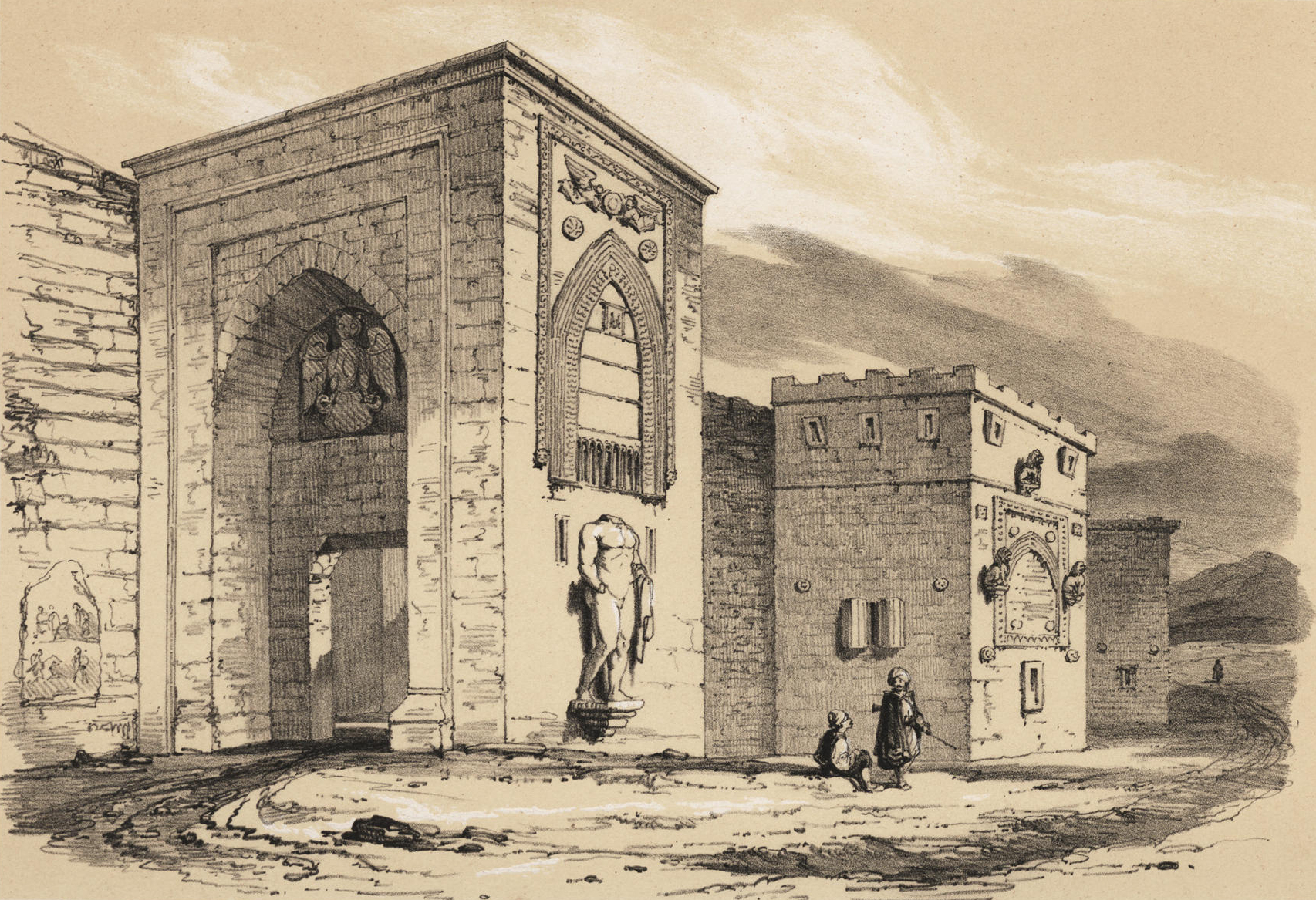
Walls of the Konya citadel, built and decorated by Kayqubad I, incorporated many Greco-Roman Classical elements. Léon de Laborde, 1838.

Léon, Marquis de Laborde (French pronunciation: [leɔ̃ də labɔʁd]; 1807–1869) was a French archaeologist and traveler.

== Biography ==
He was born in Paris, the son of Alexandre de Laborde. Educated in Germany, he traveled extensively in Asia Minor, Syria, and Egypt, and then entered the French diplomatic service. In 1847 he was made conservator of the Louvre Museum of Antiques, and in 1857 director-general of the archives of the Empire.

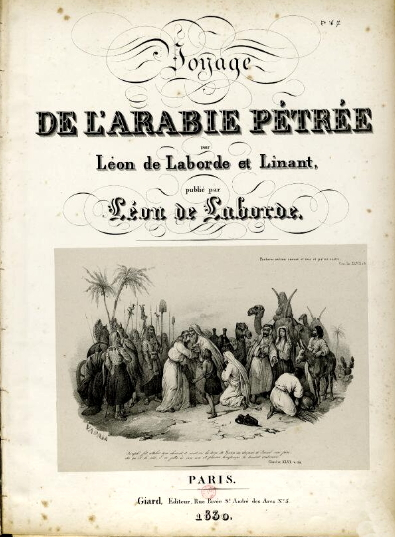
Voyage de l'Arabie Pétrée

== Works ==
His numerous works include:

- Voyage de l’Arabie pétrée. Giard, Paris 1830
  - Journey through Arabia Petraea, to Mount Sinai. and the excavated city of Petra, the Edom of the prophecies English translation by Michael Joseph Quin, publ. John Murray, London, 1836
- Voyage en Orient, Asie Mineure et Syrie (1837–62)
- Voyage de la Syrie par MM Alexandre de Laborde, Becker, Hall et Léon de Laborde. Firmin Didot, Paris 1837 (Digitalisat, U. of Heidelberg).
- Voyage de l’Asie mineure. Didot, Paris 1838 (Digitalisat, U. of Heidelberg).
- Histoire de la gravure en manière noire et son application à l’imprimerie. Jules Didot l'aîné, Paris 1839.
- Débuts de l’imprimerie à Mayence et à Bamberg, ou Description des lettres d’indulgence du pape Nicolas V, pro regno Cypri, imprimées en 1454. Techener, Paris 1840 (Digitalisat, U. of Heidelberg).
- Recherches de ce qu’il s’est conservé dans l’Égypte moderne de la science des anciens magiciens. J. Renouard, Paris 1841 (Digitalisat).
- Les Ducs de Bourgogne. Étude sur les lettres, les arts et l'industrie pendant le XVe siècle et plus particulièrement dans les Pays-Bas et le duché de Bourgogne. Drei Bände. Plon, Paris 1849–1852 (Digitalisat: Tome 1, Tome 2).
- La Renaissance des arts à la cour de France, étude sur le XVIe siècle. 2 vols. L. Potier, Paris 1850–1855 (Digitalisat: Tome 1, Additions).
- Athènes aux XVe, XVIe et XVIIe siècles. 2 vols. J. Renouard, Paris 1854 (Digitalisat: Tome 1, Tome 2).
- De l’Union des arts et de l’industrie, rapport fait au nom de la commission française de l’exposition universelle de Londres sur les beaux-arts et sur les industries qui se rattachent aux Beaux-arts. 2 vols. Imprimerie impériale, Paris 1856.
- Les Archives de la France, leur vicissitudes pendant la Révolution, leur régénération sous l’Empire. Renouard, Paris 1867 (Digitalisat).
- postum: Les Comptes des Bâtiments du Roi, 1528–1570, suivis de documents inédits sur les châteaux royaux et les arts au XVIe siècle, recueillis et mis en ordre par feu le marquis de Laborde. 2 vols. J. Baur, Paris 1877–1880 (Digitalisat: Tome 1, Tome 2).
