= Konya citadel =

- Konya citadel
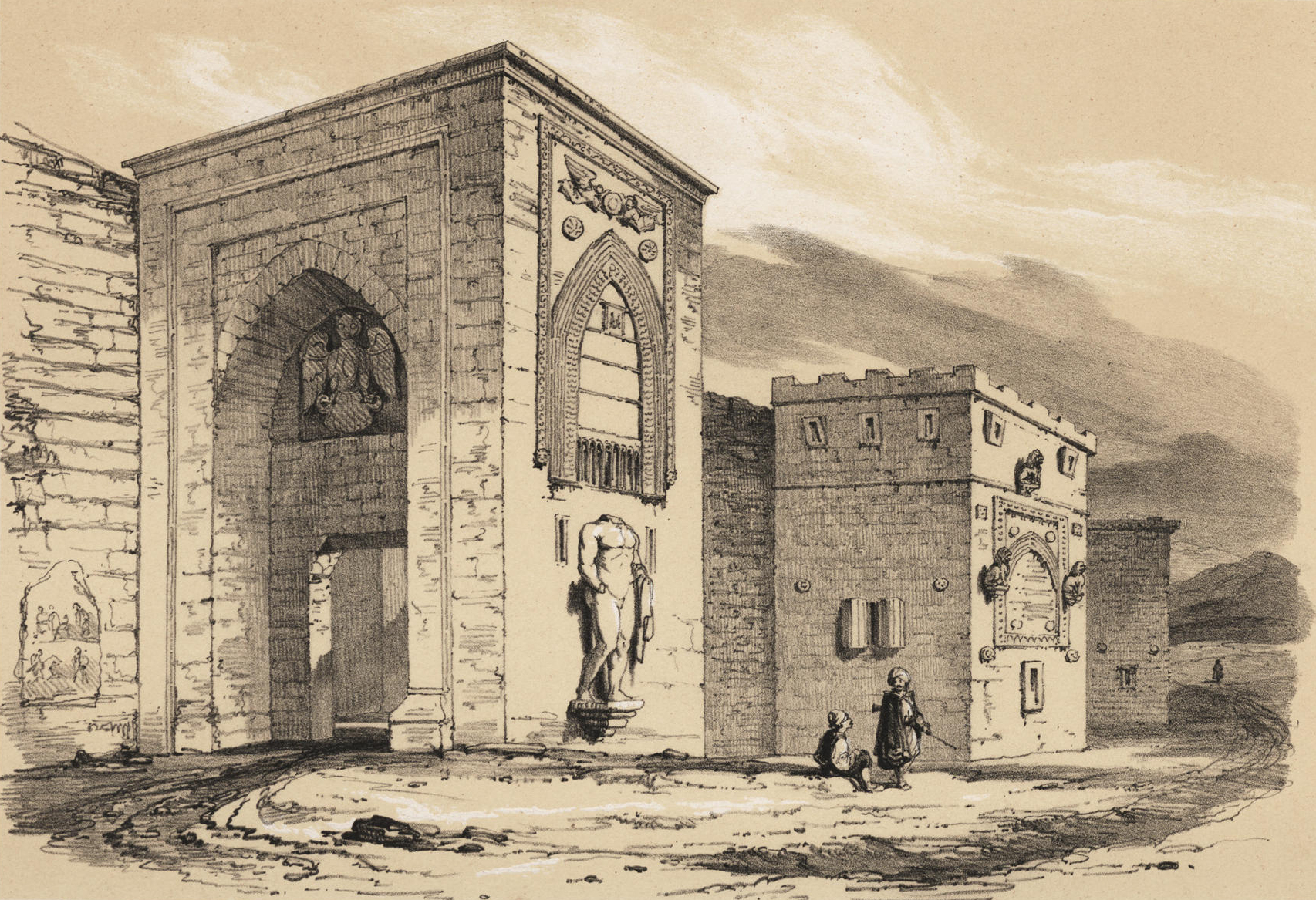
- The walls of Konya, built and decorated by Kayqubad I, incorporated many Greco-Roman Classical elements. Voyage de l'Asie Mineure, Léon de Laborde, 1838.
- Interactive map of the Konya citadel area
- Former names: Konya citadel

General information
- Type: Castle
- Architectural style: Seljuk
- Location: Konya, Turkey
- Coordinates: 37°52′21″N 32°29′31″E
- Completed: 1220s

The Konya citadel refers to the defensive walls surrounding the center of the city of Konya in Turkey, encircling the area now called "Alaaddin Hill". The walls were built in the early 1220s by Kayqubad I (r.1220–1237) of the Sultanate of Rum.

== Structure ==
The Konya citadel protected the administrative, residential, and ceremonial center of the city, including the older Alaeddin Mosque and the Seljuk palace of Konya which was fused with part of the wall of the citadel.

A weaker citadel called the Zindankale functioned as outer protective belt for the city itself.

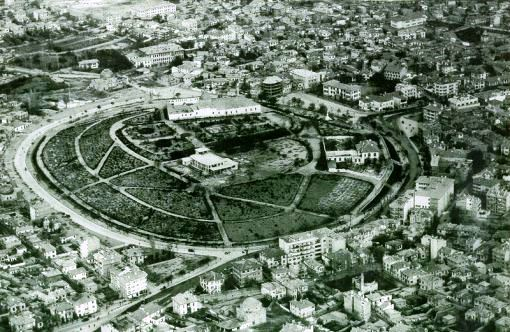
The main circle corresponds to the former tracing of the walls of the Konya citadel

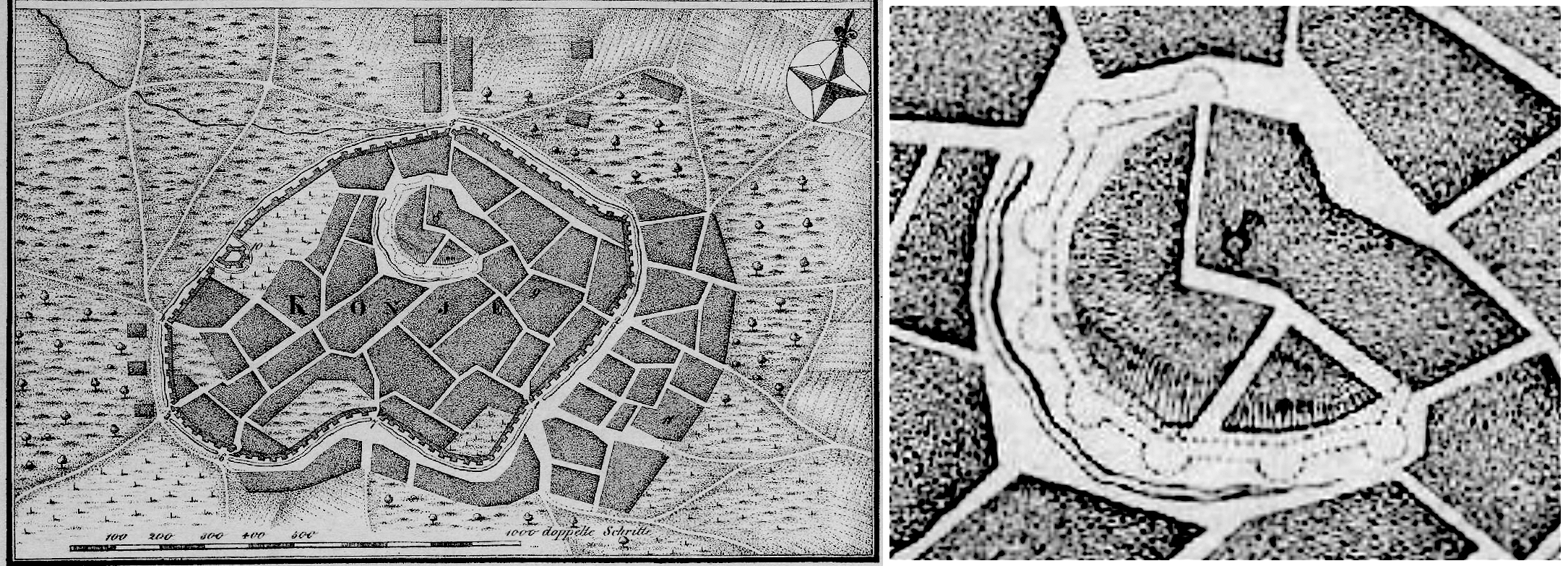
Plan of Konya, and detail of the Konya citadel at the center, Carsten Niebuhr 1766

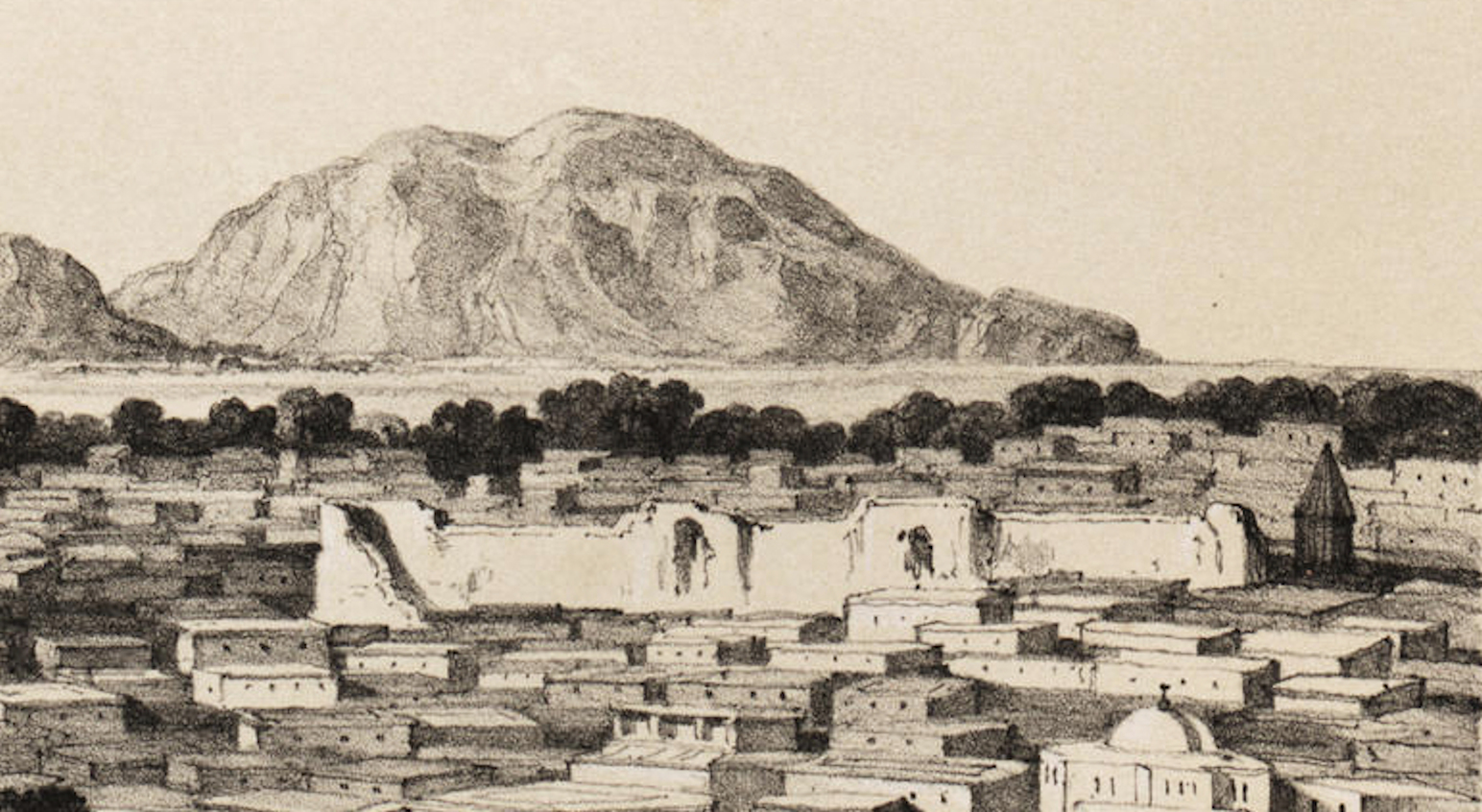
Konya citadel in 1838 (from the east)

== Decoration ==
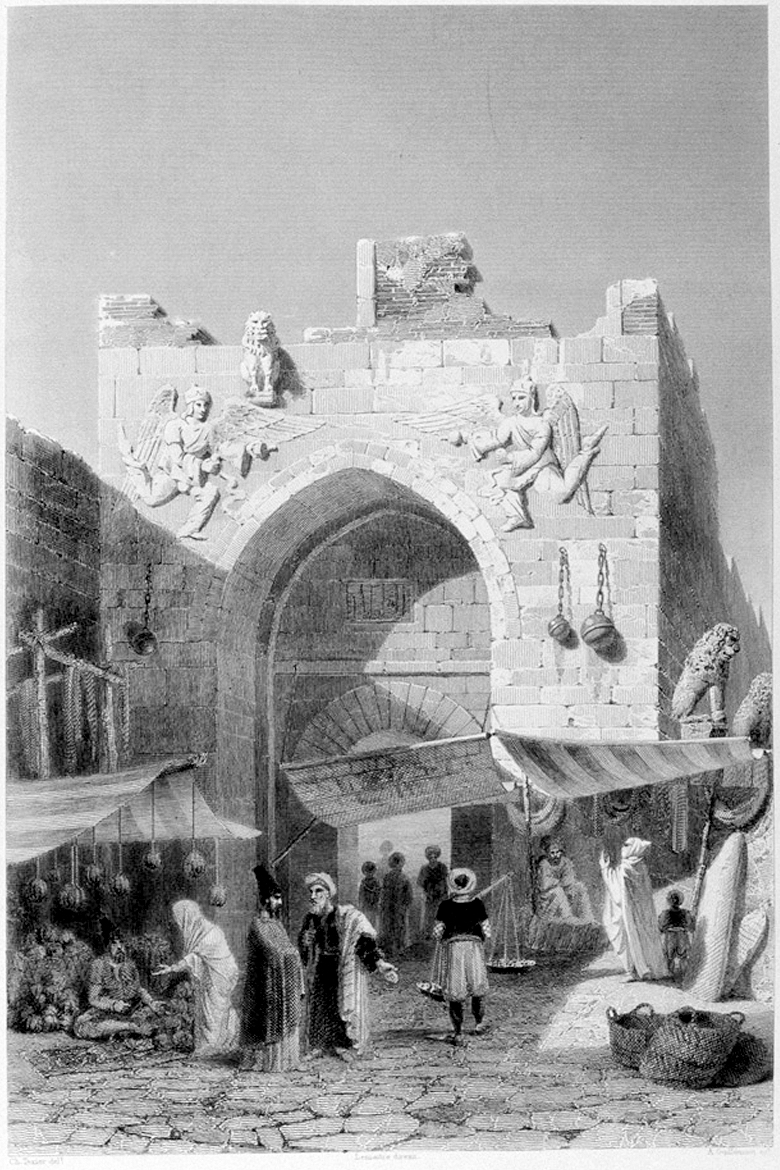
Bazaar Gate in Konya. Charles Texier, Description de l’Asie Mineure (1833–1837).

The citadel incorporated many western decorative elements, such as a statue of Hercules, a frieze from a Roman sarcophagus, courtly scenes with seated figures in toga, winged deities around the figure of the sun, mixed with inscriptions in Arabic. It would seem that such symbolism mixing Western and Eastern elements was mostly derived from the influence of the Artuqids, who were adept at combining Classical and Perso-Islamic approaches.

The walls no longer exist. Almost nothing remains to this day, apart from a few sculpture pieces found in museums, such as the Ince Minare Museum in Konya.

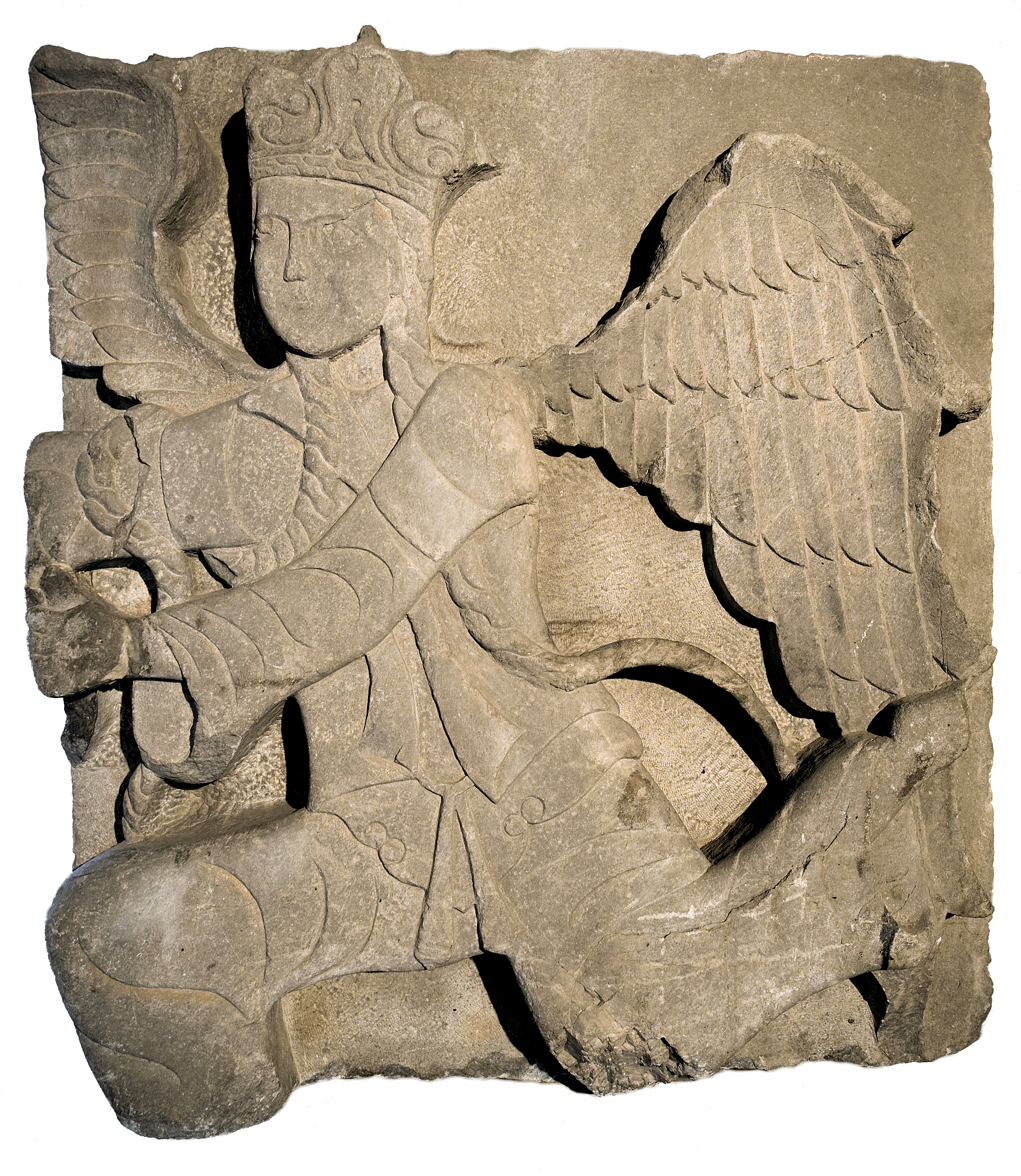
Seljuk winged angel (right), Ince Minare Museum

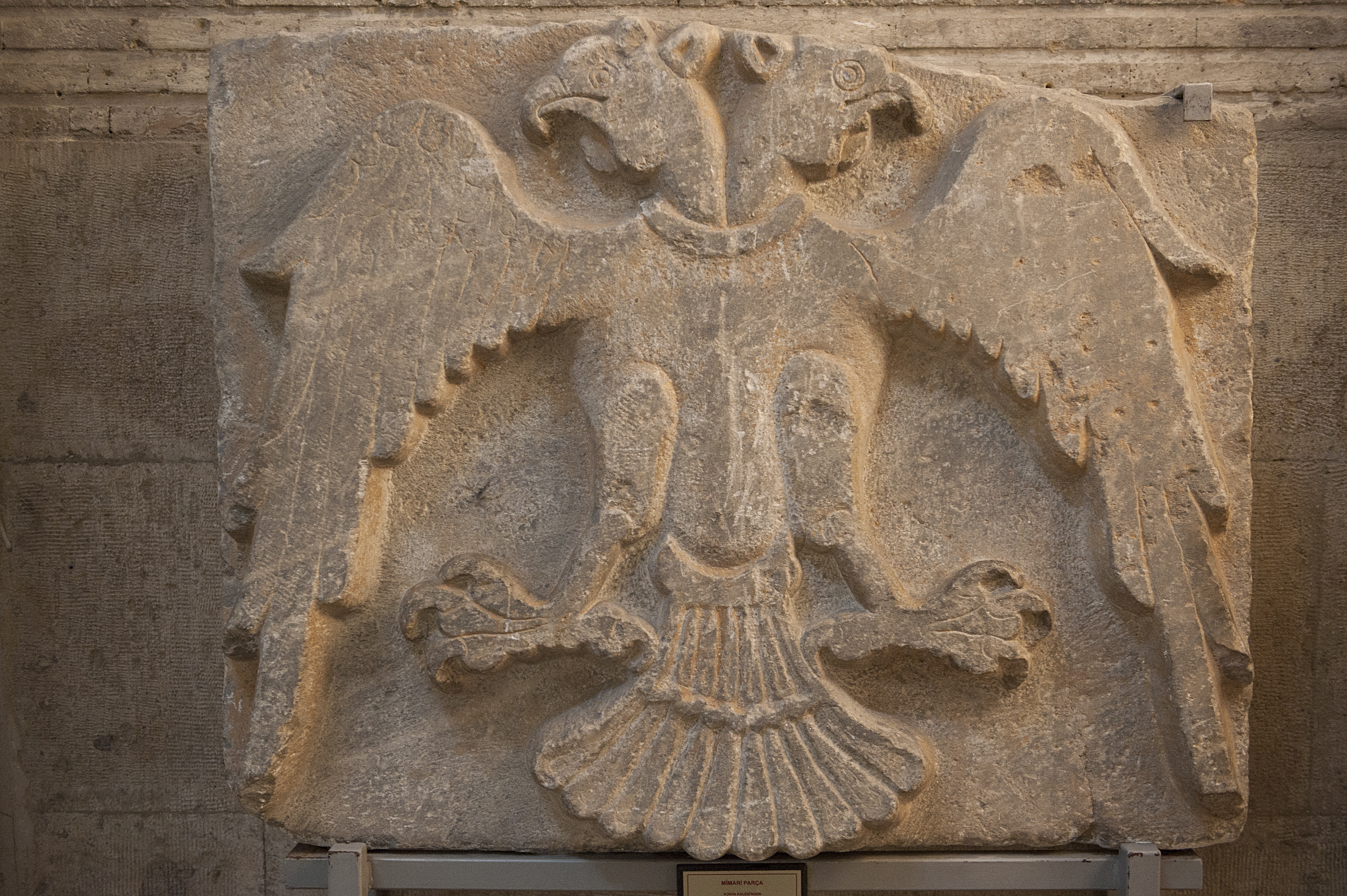
The double-headed eagle, symbol of Kayqubad I

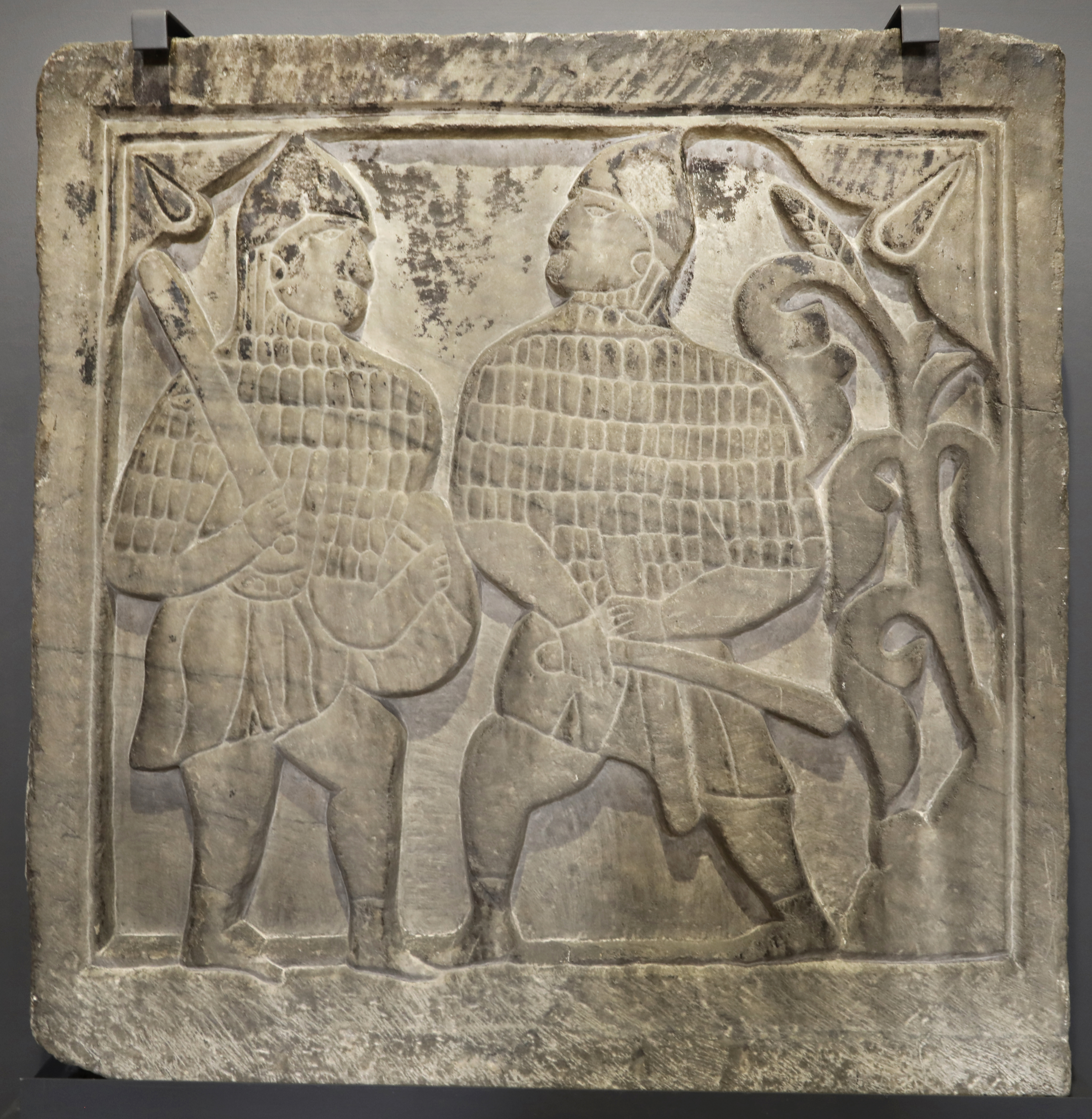
Seljuk Rum soldiers

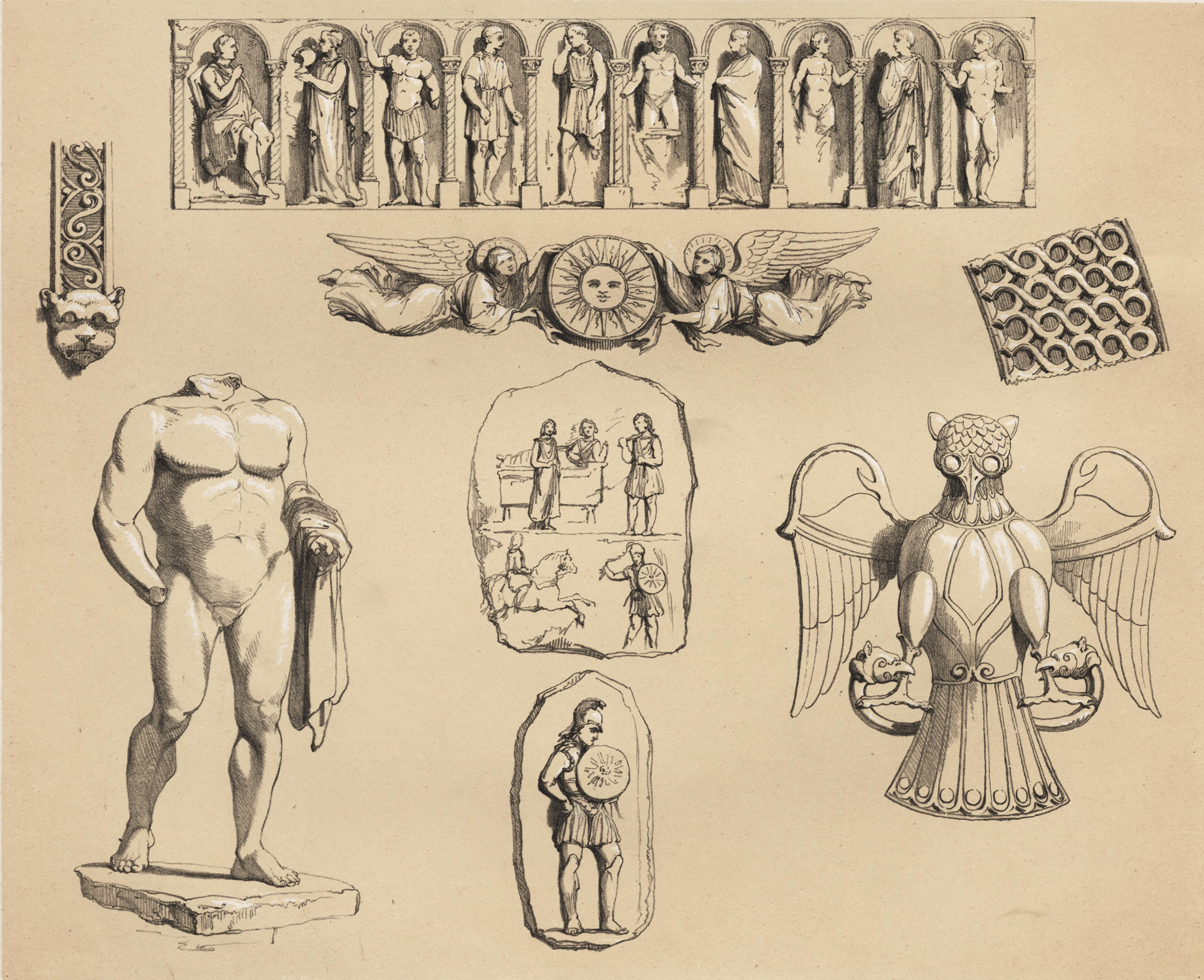
Some decorative elements, including Greco-Roman examples

== See also ==
- Seljuk palace of Konya
