= Seljuk palace of Konya =

Coordinates: 37.8741°N 32.4927°E

- Seljuk palace of Konya
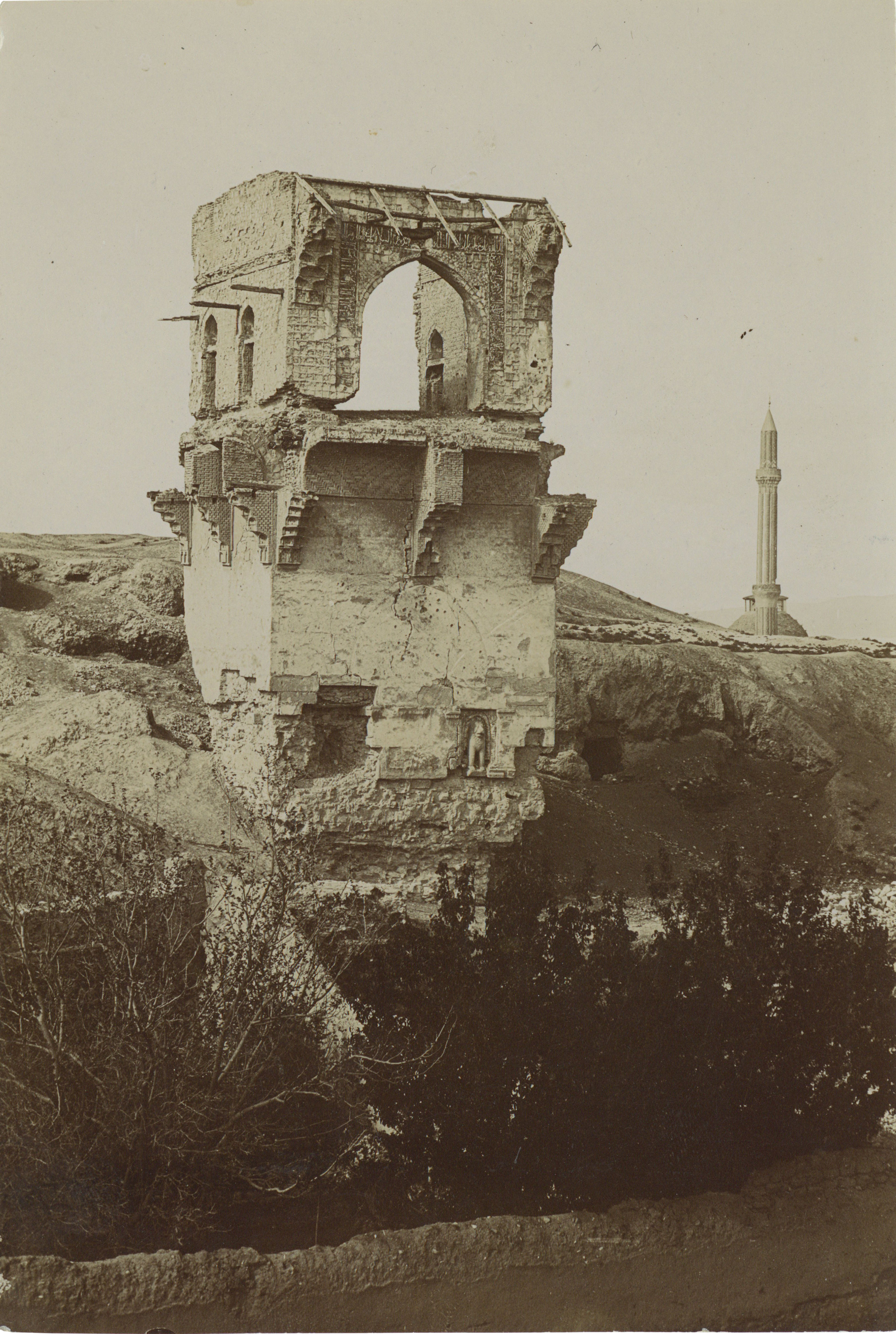
- Seljuk palace of Konya, 19th century ruins, the minaret of the Alâeddin Mosque visible in the background
- Interactive map of the Seljuk palace of Konya area
- Former names: Seljuk palace of Konya

General information
- Type: Palace
- Architectural style: Seljuk
- Location: Konya, Turkey
- Completed: 1156-1192

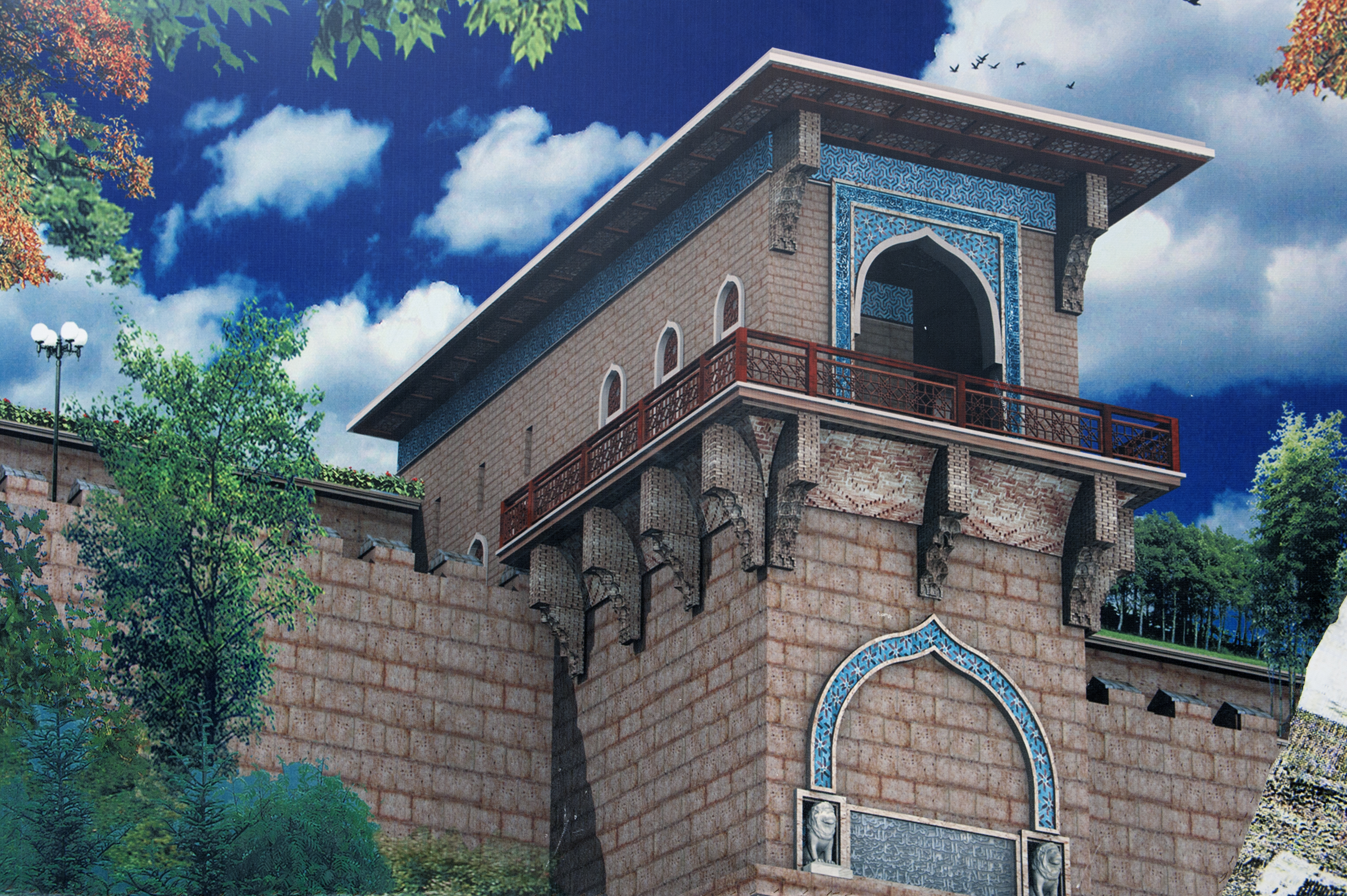
Seljuk palace of Konya, modern reconstruction

The Seljuk palace of Konya, locally known as the Seljuk Kiosk, or sometimes the Alaeddin Kiosk (Alaeddin Köşkü) or the Kılıç Arslan II Kiosk, is an ancient palatial structure in Konya, Turkey. The Palace was initially built by Sultan Kılıç Aslan II (1156-1192) the fifth Sultan of the Sultanate of Rum. It is the earliest datable court monument of the Sultanate of Rum.

Although only ruins remain today, discovered fragments suggest that the building was decorated with highly sophisticated artistic styles. The luxurious tiles found in the remains are reminiscent of the ceramic works of Kashan in Iran. There are scenes of equestrial combat and royal hunts. Stucco reliefs in Seljuk style were also found.

The palace was refurnished by Alaeddin Kayqubad I (r.1220–1237). He also built the Konya citadel, a protective structure around the palace and the nearby Alaeddin Mosque.

Only minimal ruins remain today, a tower and a few portions of the walls, hence its local name of "Kiosk".

A few decorated tiles, attributed to the reign of Kılıç Aslan II, were also found in the ruins.

== See also ==
- Konya citadel
- Anatolian Seljuk architecture

== Gallery ==
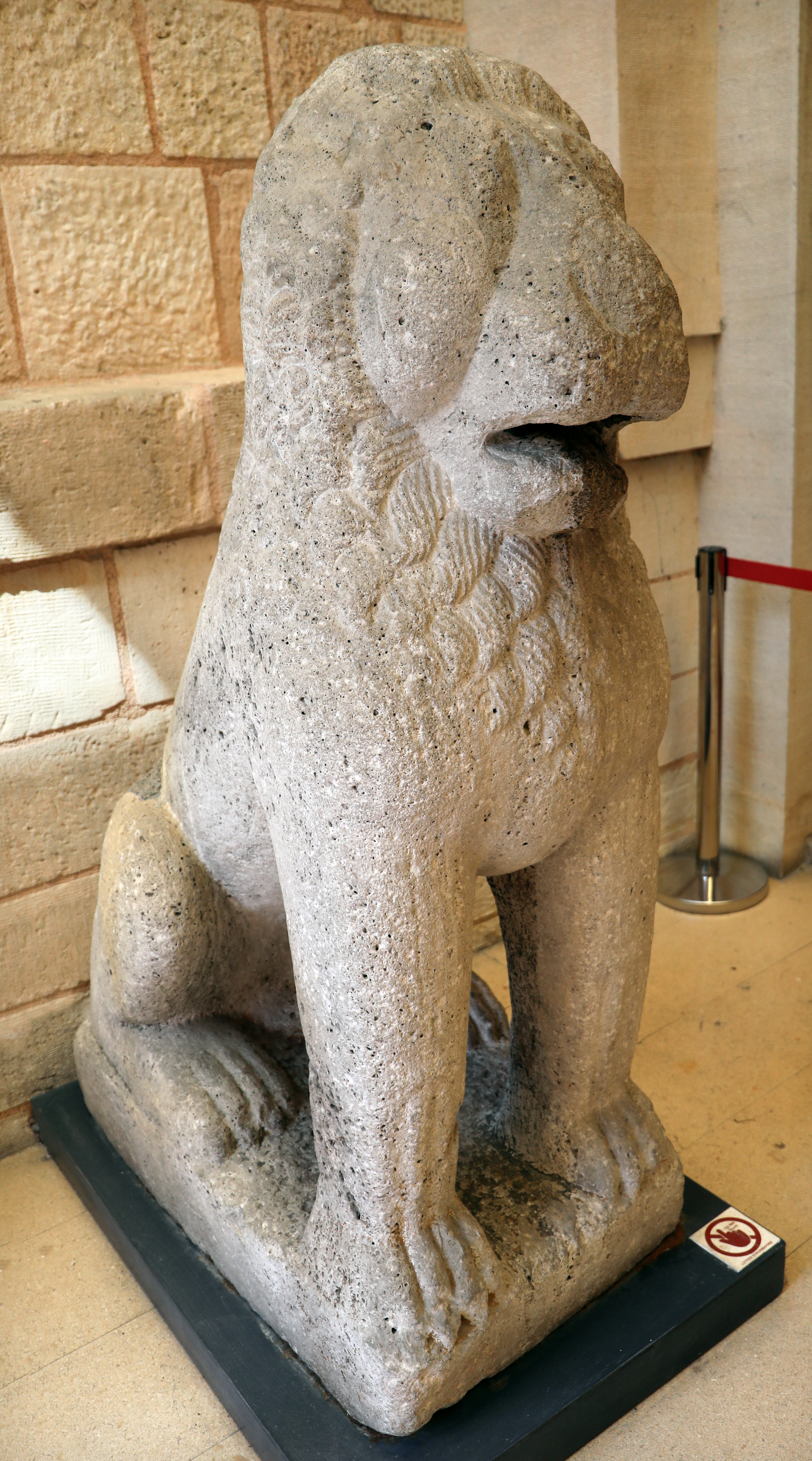
Lion sculpture from the walls of the palace

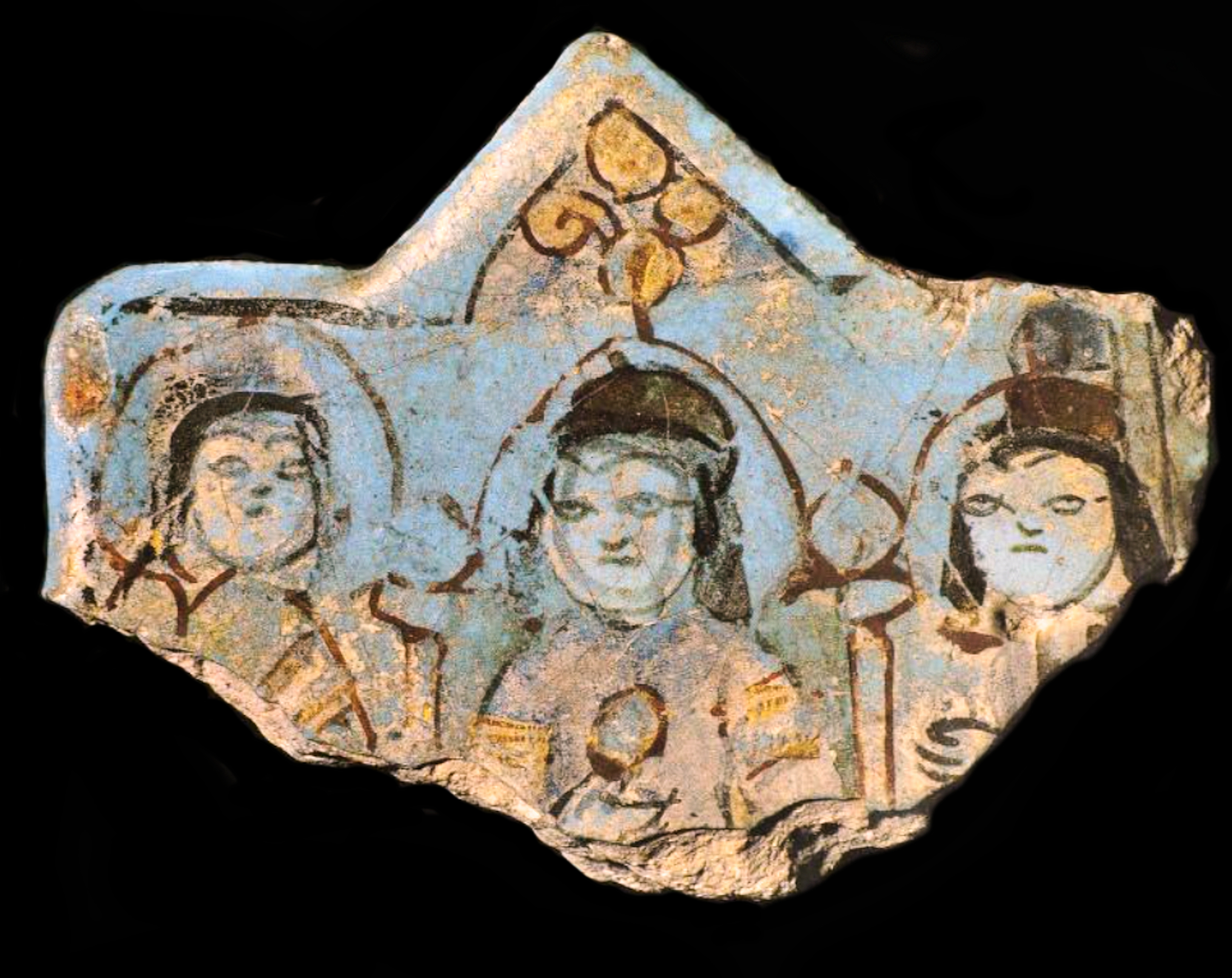
Sultan Kilij Arslan II enthroned, Alaeddin Palace, Konya, 1156–1192.

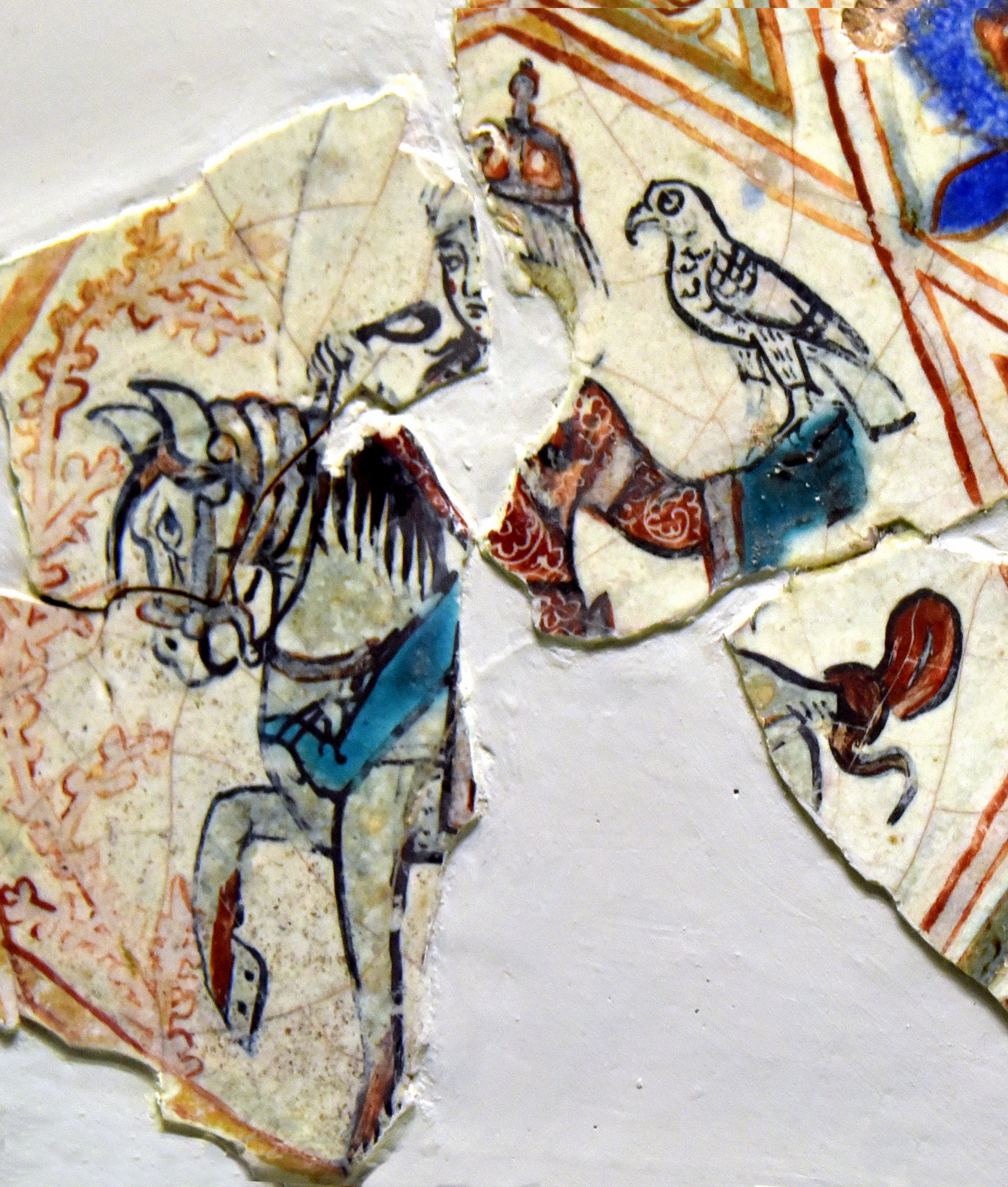
Royal hunt. Glazed Anatolian Seljuq tile Konya, 2nd half of 12th century.

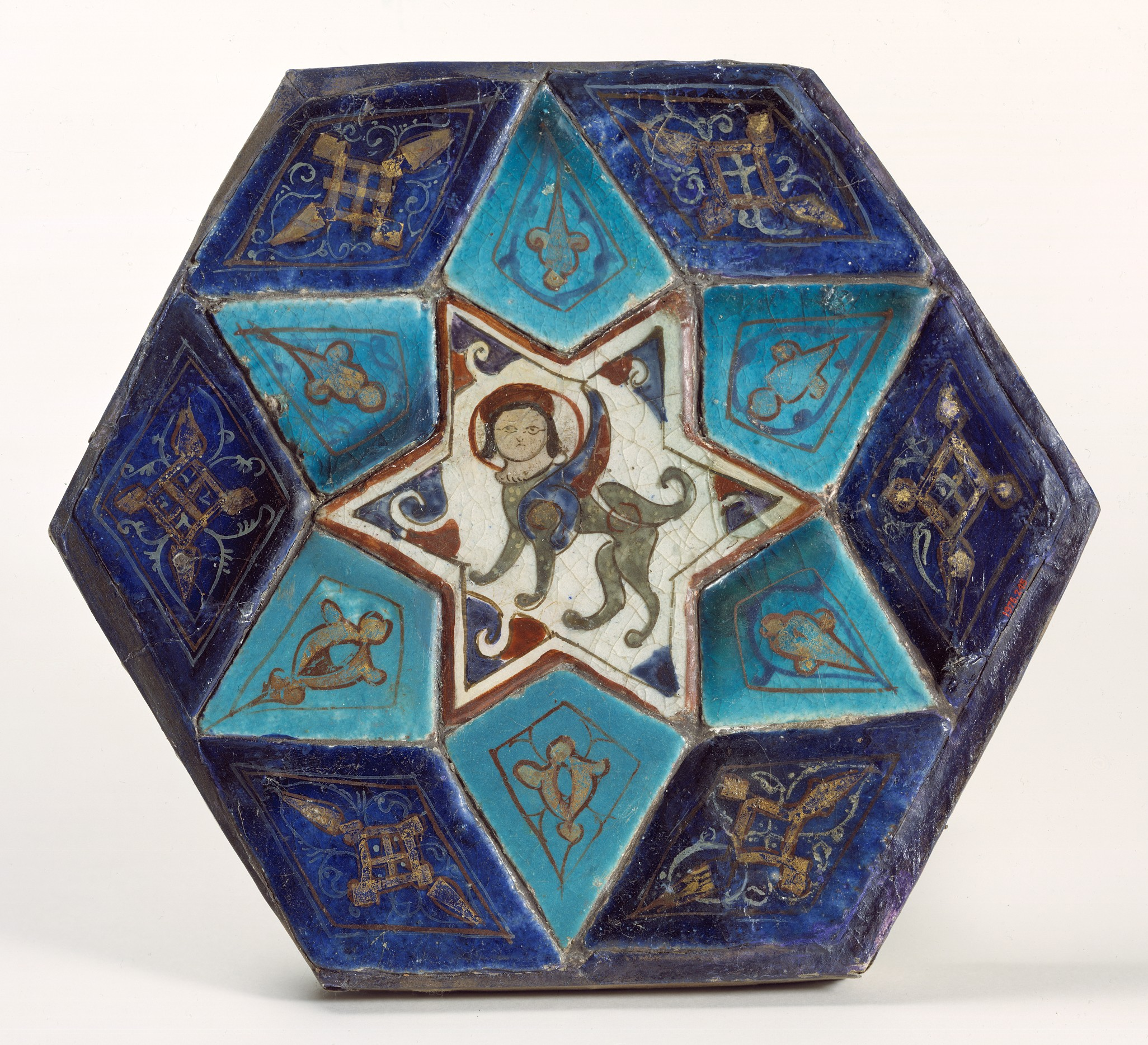
Hexagonal tile ensemble with Sphinx, ca.1160s–70s.

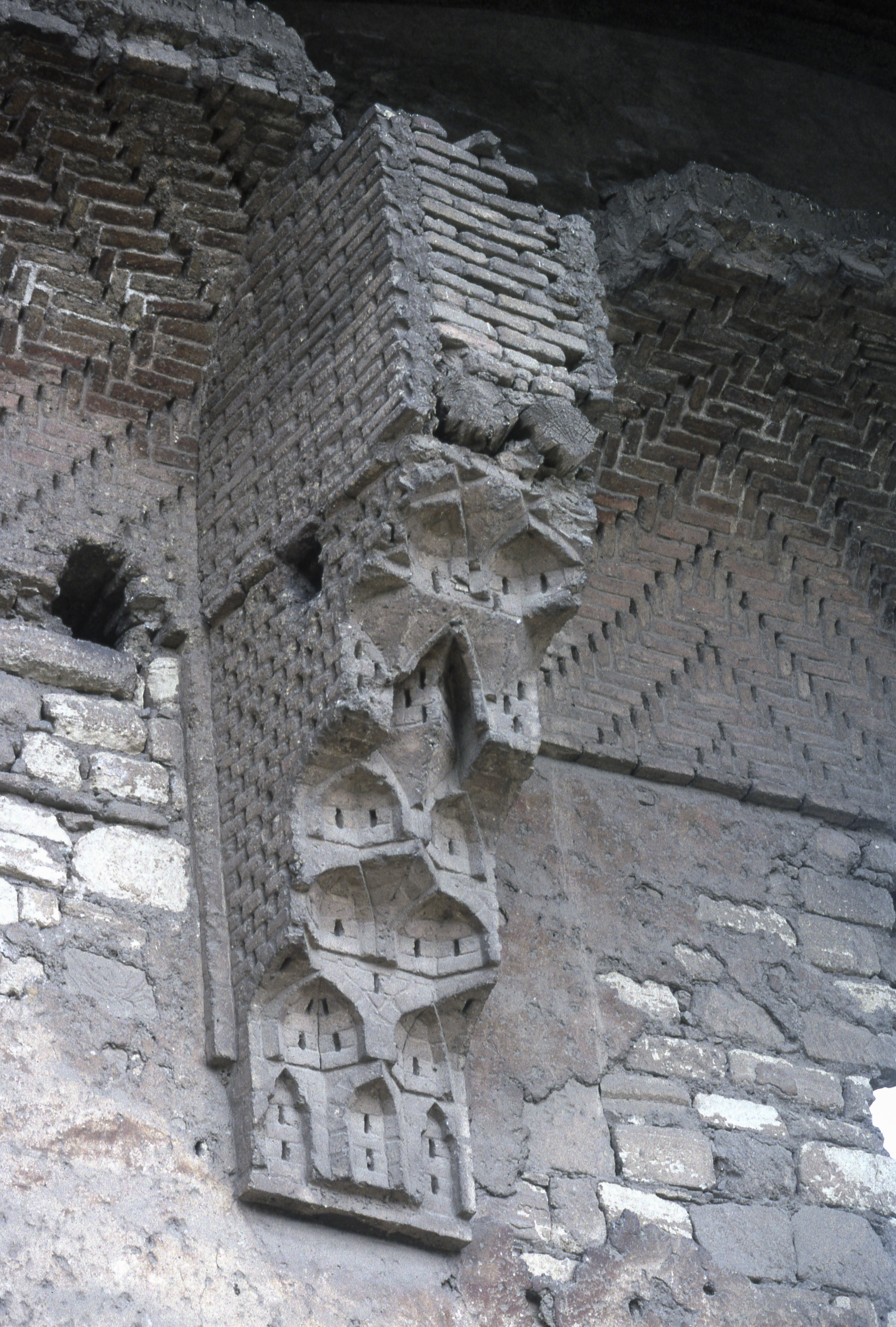
Remains of muqarnas

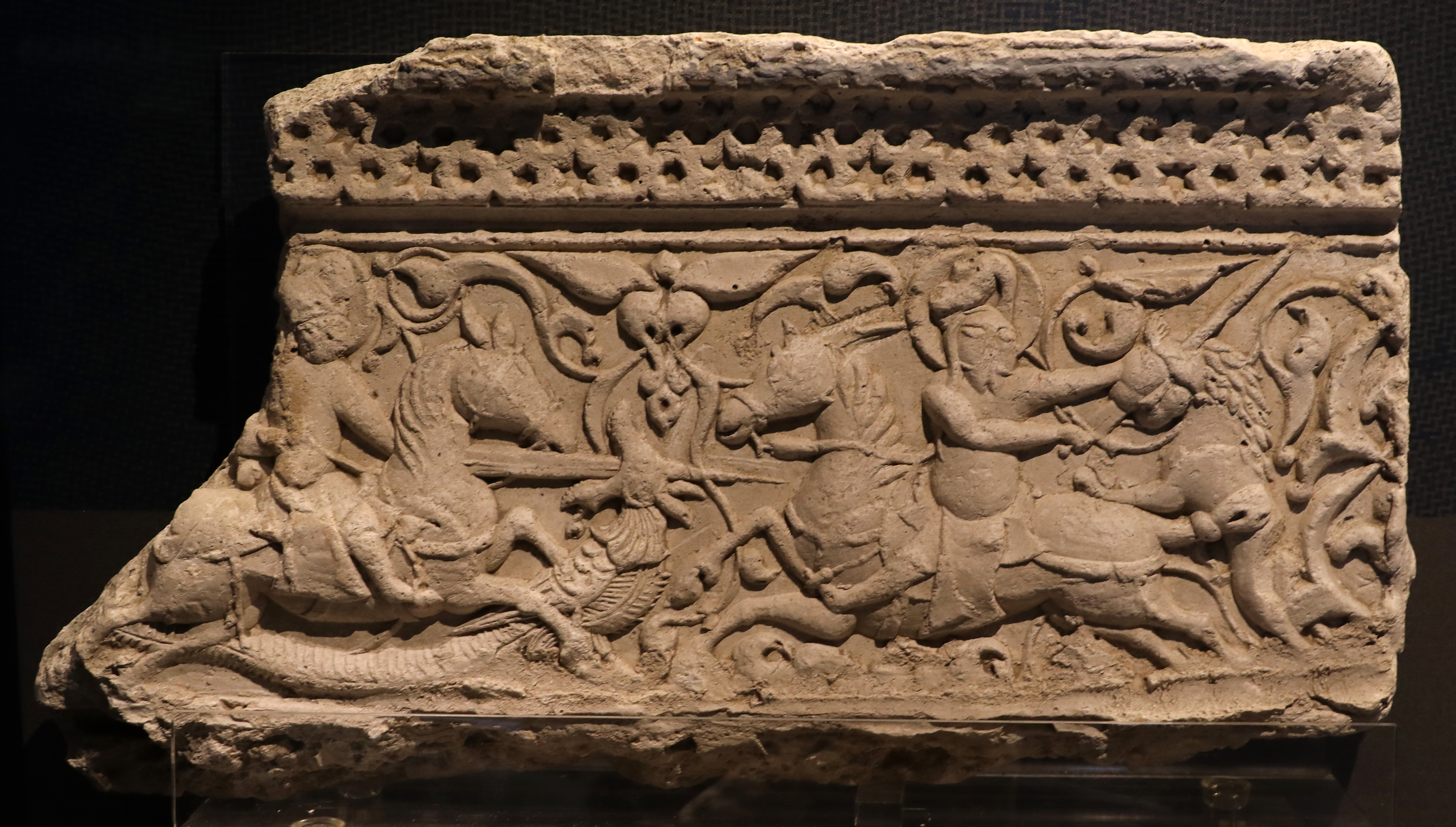
Hunting scene in a frieze.
