= Chobanids (beylik) =

Ruling dynasty of the Anatolian beylik

Chobanids Çobanoğulları
- 1227–1309
- Capital: Kastamonu
- Common languages: Old Anatolian Turkish
- Religion: Sunni Islam
- Government: Beylik
- Bey
  - 1227: Hüsamettin Çoban Bey
  - 1309: Çobanoğlu Mahmud Bey
- Historical era: Late Medieval
  - Established: 1227
  - Disestablished: 1309
Preceded by	Succeeded by
Sultanate of Rum	Beylik of Candar

The Chobanids (Modern Turkish: Çobanoğulları, Çobanoğulları Beyliği) were the ruling dynasty of the Turkish Anatolian beylik (principality) that controlled the city and region of Kastamonu in the 13th century.

== History ==
The founder of the dynasty was Hüsamettin Çoban, a prominent Kayı statesman and a commander of the Sultans of Rum during the reigns of Kaykaus I and his successor Kayqubad I. In the early decades of the 13th century, Hüsamettin Çoban was one of the commanders of the raids that extended Seljuk territory in northern Anatolia at the expense of the Byzantine Empire of Trebizond. As a result, he had acquired Kastamonu as a fiefdom. Between 1224 and 1227, he also led the Seljuq army and fleet that set sail from Sinop and captured and fortified the city of Sudak in Crimea.

After Hüsamettin Çoban's death, his hereditary possessions centered in Kastamonu were ruled respectively by his son and grandson, Alp Yürek and Yavlak Arslan. Until the last years of Yavlak Arslan's reign, the Chobanid Beys pursued a prudent policy of allegiance to the Mongols who had established their hegemony over Anatolia following the Battle of Köse Dag. A rebellion in the end by Yavlak Arslan resulted in his death in battle before Kastamonu against combined Seljuq–Mongol forces, and the region was awarded to Seljuk commander Şemseddin Yaman Candar, whose descendants went on to found the Beylik of Candar centred in the same region and surrounding areas.

Although Yaman Candar was momentarily pushed out of the region by Yavlak Arslan's son Çobanoğlu Mahmud Bey, who also organized further raids into Byzantine territory to extend his domain, in 1309, this last bey of the Chobanids was attacked by Şemseddin Yaman Candar's son Candaroğlu Süleyman Pasha and the region of Kastamonu was once again annexed into the Beylik of Candar.

Contemporary or near-contemporary sources for the history of the Chobanid dynasty include Byzantine historians George Pachymeres and Nicephorus Gregoras and the Seljuk historian Ibn Bibi.

The Chobanid dynasty left important works of architecture in and around Kastamonu. The Ottomans were vassals between 1281 and 1299 but declared independence after Yavlak Arslan stopped raiding the Byzantines in 1299.

== List of rulers ==
Bey	Reign	Notes
Hüsamettin Çoban	1227–?	Founder of the Chobanids.
Alp Yürek	?–1280	
Muzaffer al-Din Yavlak Arslan	1280–1292	
Çobanoğlu Mahmud Bey	1292–1309	

== See also ==
- List of Sunni Muslim dynasties
