= Shams al-Din Altınapa =

Seljuk vizier

- Opponent: Sa'd al-Din Köpek

Shams al-Din Altınapa or Atabey Altun Aba (Turkish: Şemseddin Altun Aba, fl. 1192–1237) was a Seljuk vizier. He at first was a military commander under Kilij Arslan II and Süleyman Shah II. After Süleyman II died, he served his son, Giyaseddin Keyhüsrev I, and then later his son, Alaeddin Keykubad I. Kaykubad I later made him the atabey of his son, Gıyaseddin Keyhüsrev II, who was the last sultan he served before getting killed.

== Biography ==
=== Life ===
He also served as the food taster of the Sultan. The historian, Ibn-Bibi, also says that he fighting in the Battle of Kahta and then he stopped what he was doing and went to Damascus and signed a wedding agreement between the Ayyubids and the Seljuks for the wedding of Ghaziya Hatun (also known as Melike Hatun), the daughter of Ebubekir el-Adil, the Ayyubid ruler at that time, with Kaykubad I. He then took her to Malatya where Melike Hatun's wedding with Alaeddin Keykubad I took place in 1227.

He was also one of the people who, like Emir Sa'd al-Din Köpek, helped Keyhusrev II to become the Sultan after Kaykubad I died in 1237 CE.

Like many Seljuk administrators, he also built a caravanserai named Altınapa Han, however, it is now underwater due to rise in sea levels.

=== Death ===
Altun Aba was killed by Sultan Giyaseddin's men because of Emir Sa'd al-Din Köpek when he was around 60 to 70 years-old. Sara Nur Yildiz, a historian, on this issue also writes:

While at court in Antalya, the atabeg Altun-aba noticed the disturbing influence Köpek had on the young Sultan; he was likewise alarmed by Kaykhusraw II's binge drinking. He pointed this out to (Kemaleddin) Kamyar and Husam al-Din Qaymari, the beglerbegi, or commander-in-chief, based in Konya, warning them that if they did not take measures against Köpek, he would in turn destroy them. Kamyar, however, not only refused to engage in conspiracies, but he even informed Köpek that he faced opposition from Altun-aba. Köpek responded by making up falsehoods about the atabeg, and convinced the Sultan to have the atabeg killed. Thus, while court was still being held at Antalya, Altun-aba was dragged by his white beard from the meeting being held at the imperial dīwān and murdered in the countryside by one of the Sultan's imperial guards.

== In popular culture ==
In the Turkish TV series, Diriliş: Ertuğrul, he is portrayed as an antagonist by the Turkish actor, Hasan Küçükçetin.

== See also ==
- Ertuğrul
- Husam al-Din Qaraja
