= Battle of Sudak =

1221 Seljuk victory in Crimea

- Part of Campaigns of Kayqubad the Great
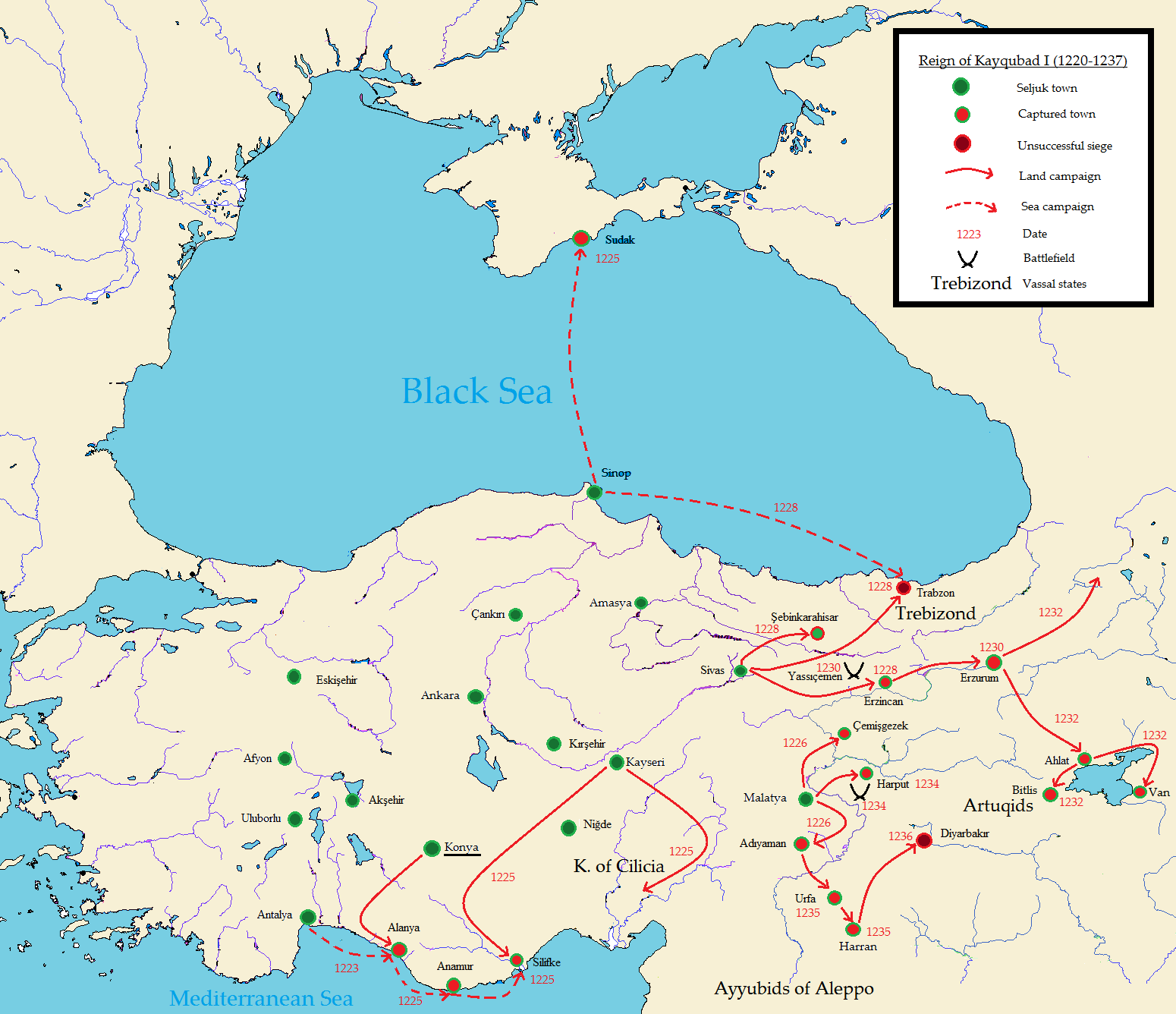
- Campaigns of Sultan Kayqubad
| Date | Uncertain, likely between 1220 and 1222 |
| Location | Sudak |
| Result | Seljuk victory |
| Territorial changes | Temporary Seljuk occupation of Sudak until 1223 |

Belligerents
| Anatolian Seljuk Sultanate | Cuman-Kipchaks; Kievan Rus’ |

Commanders and leaders
| Kayqubad the Great; Husam al-Din Choban | Unknown |

The Battle of Sudak took place in 1221 or 1222 when Rus-Kipchak forces attempted to capture the city of Sudak in Crimea from the Seljuks of Rum.

According to the historian Ibn Bibi, three Muslim merchants complained to the Seljuk Sultan, Kayqubad I, that they had been mistreated and that their properties had been taken by the people of Sudak. The Sultan resolved into military action and appointed the governor of Sinop, Husam al-Din Choban, to lead a military campaign against Sudak.

Arriving at Sudak, Husam al-Din found the city anxious to come to terms. The people declared themselves as loyal to the Sultan and offered to pay tribute. However, it was a ruse, as they attempted to collect time while a combined Rus-Kipchak army came to their aid. Husam, however, refused these terms and began landing his troops and holding a banquet. The next morning, he was surprised by the newly arrived army. The Seljuks successfully fought off the attack with fierce struggle.

After this defeat, the Russians sent an envoy to Husam declaring loyalty. He agreed on the condition that the Rus would pay tribute. He also sent slaves and booty back to Anatolia. Husam then marched to the city itself and was successfully captured after a fierce fight. The Seljuks imposed the Islamic law. A mosque was built and Muslim scholars were appointed. Husam then returned to Anatolia, leaving a garrison in the city. The Seljuks, however, were not able to hold Sudak for long as in January 1223 the Mongols took the city and sacked it.

== Sources ==
- Peacock, A. C. S. (2006). "The Saliūq Campaign against the Crimea and the Expansionist Policy of the Early Reign of 'Alā' al-Dīn Kayqubād". Journal of the Royal Asiatic Society. 16 (2): 133–149. ISSN 1356-1863.
- Spinei, Victor (6 May 2009). The Romanians and the Turkic Nomads North of the Danube Delta from the Tenth to the Mid-Thirteenth Century. BRILL. ISBN 978-90-474-2880-0.
- Curta, Florin; Kovalev, Roman (2008). “The” Other Europe in the Middle Ages: Avars, Bulgars, Khazars and Cumans; [papers ... Presented in the Three Special Sessions at the 40th and 42nd Editions of the International Congress on Medieval Studies Held at Kalamazzo in 2005 and 2007]. BRILL. ISBN 978-90-04-16389-8.
