= Hunat Hatun Complex =

Islamic religious complex in Turkey

Coordinates: 38°43′14″N 35°29′27″E

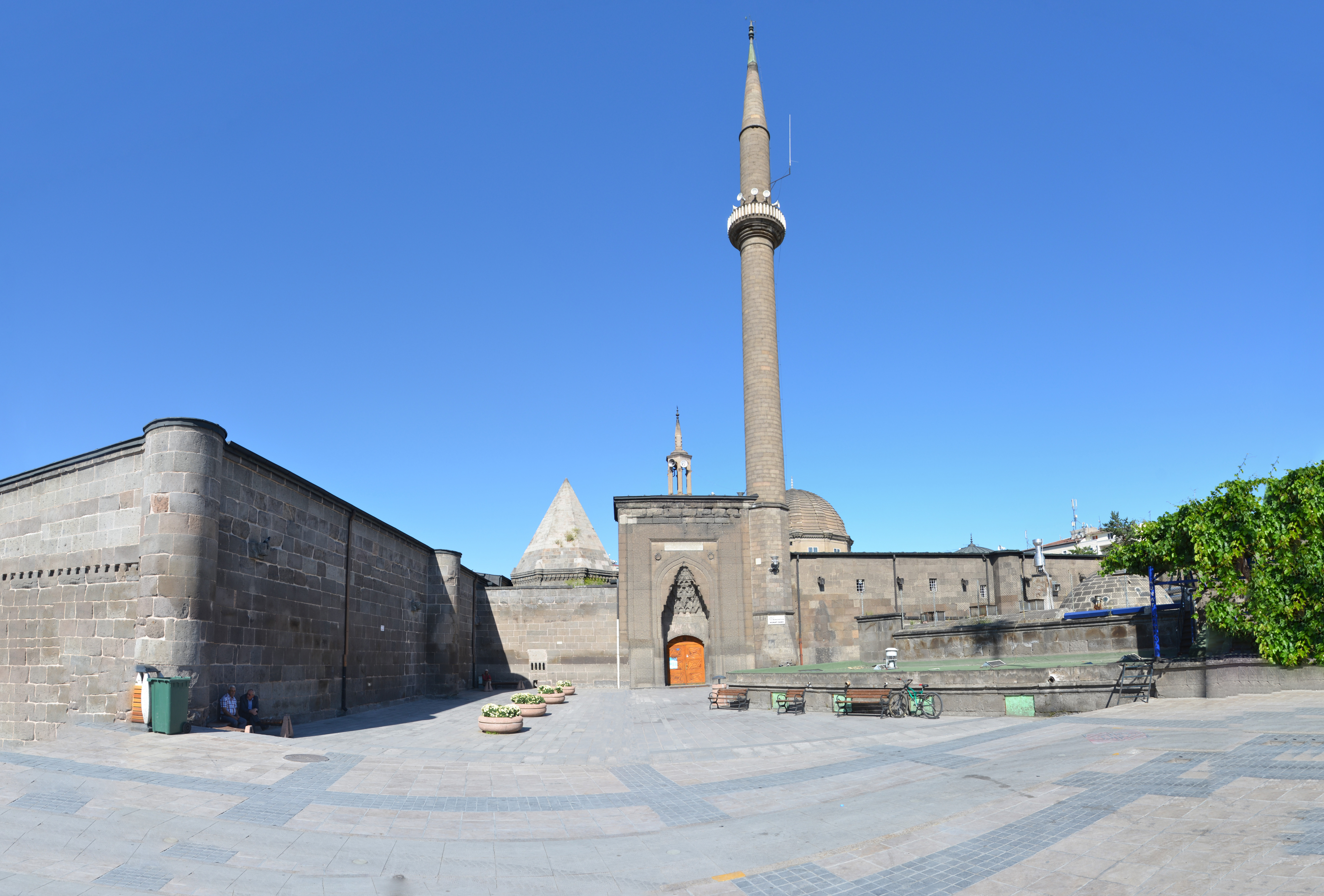
Hunat Hatun Complex

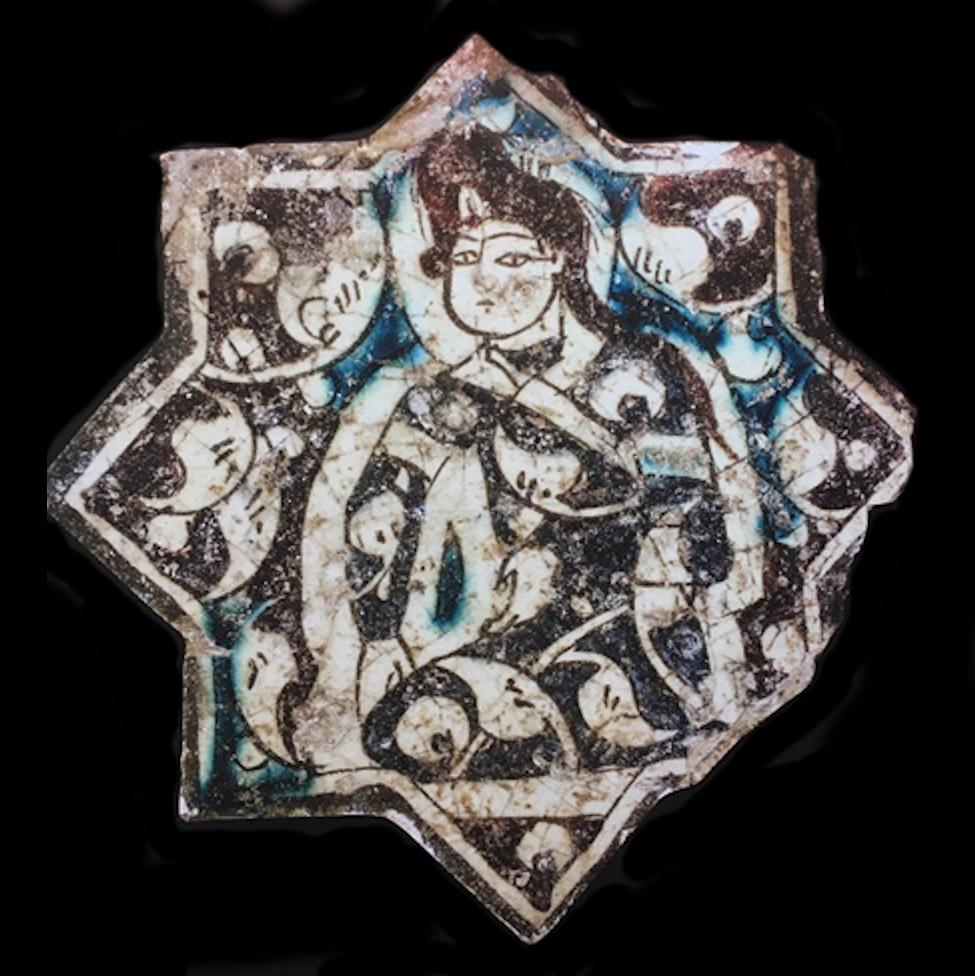
Tile from Hunat Hatun Baths in Kayseri (1237-38). Kayseri Archaeological Museum, inv. 75-665

The Hunat Hatun Complex (Turkish: Hunat Hatun Külliyesi) is a historic Islamic religious complex in Kayseri, Turkey.

Early in the 13th century, Kayqubad I, Sultan of the Anatolian Selçuks (1219–1237), captured the Alanya fortress (then called Kalon Oros, later renamed Ala'iyya) from its Armenian ruler, Kir Vart. One of the conditions of Vart's surrender was that his daughter Hunat (“lady” in Persian) Mahpari Khatun would become the sultan's wife. After her marriage, Hunat converted to Islam and commissioned the Hunat Hatun Complex, made up of the Hunat Hatun Mosque, tomb, medrese, and hamam, which is still functioning and has separate facilities for men and women.

== Gallery ==
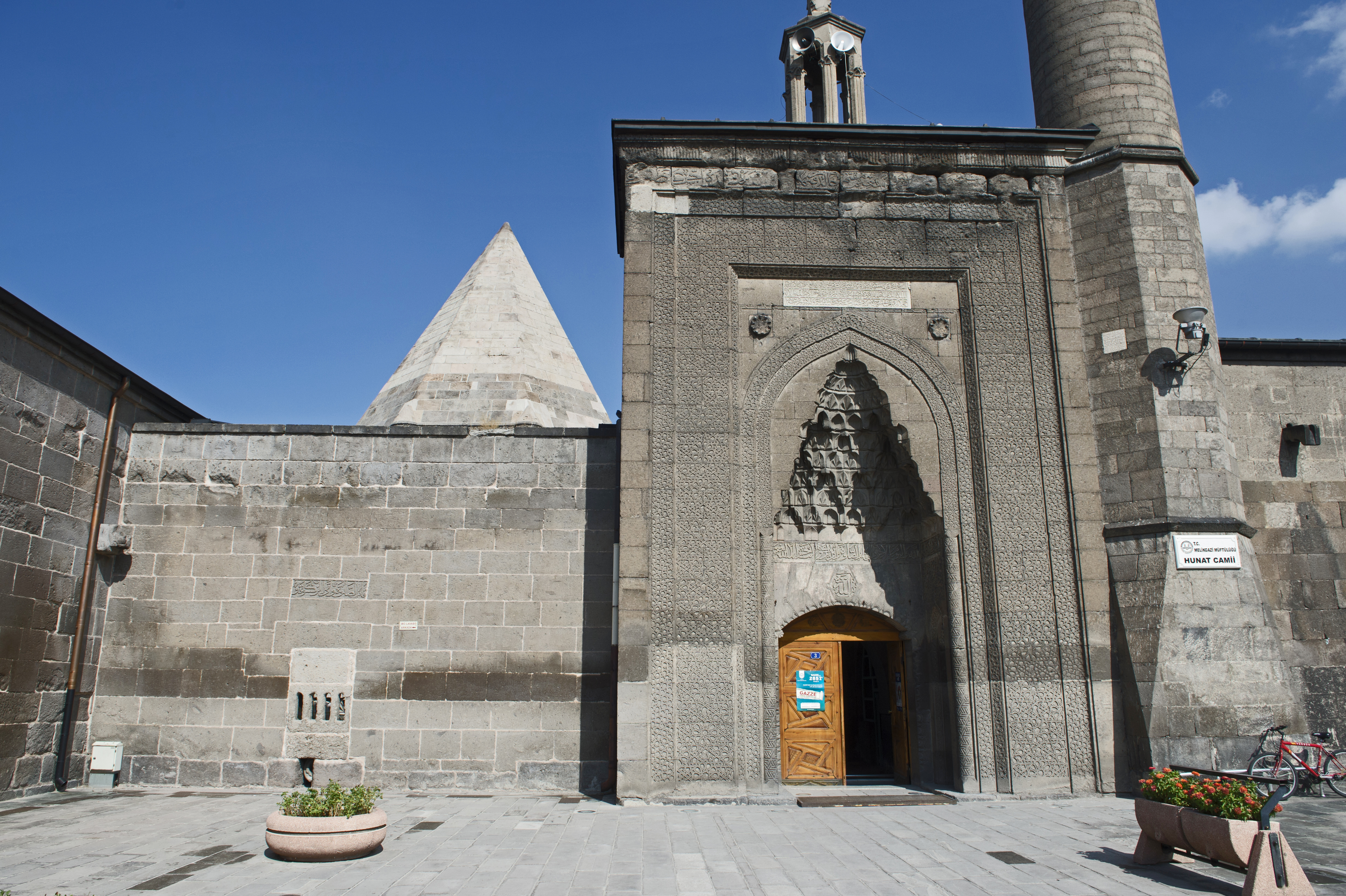
Hunat Hatun Complex Front

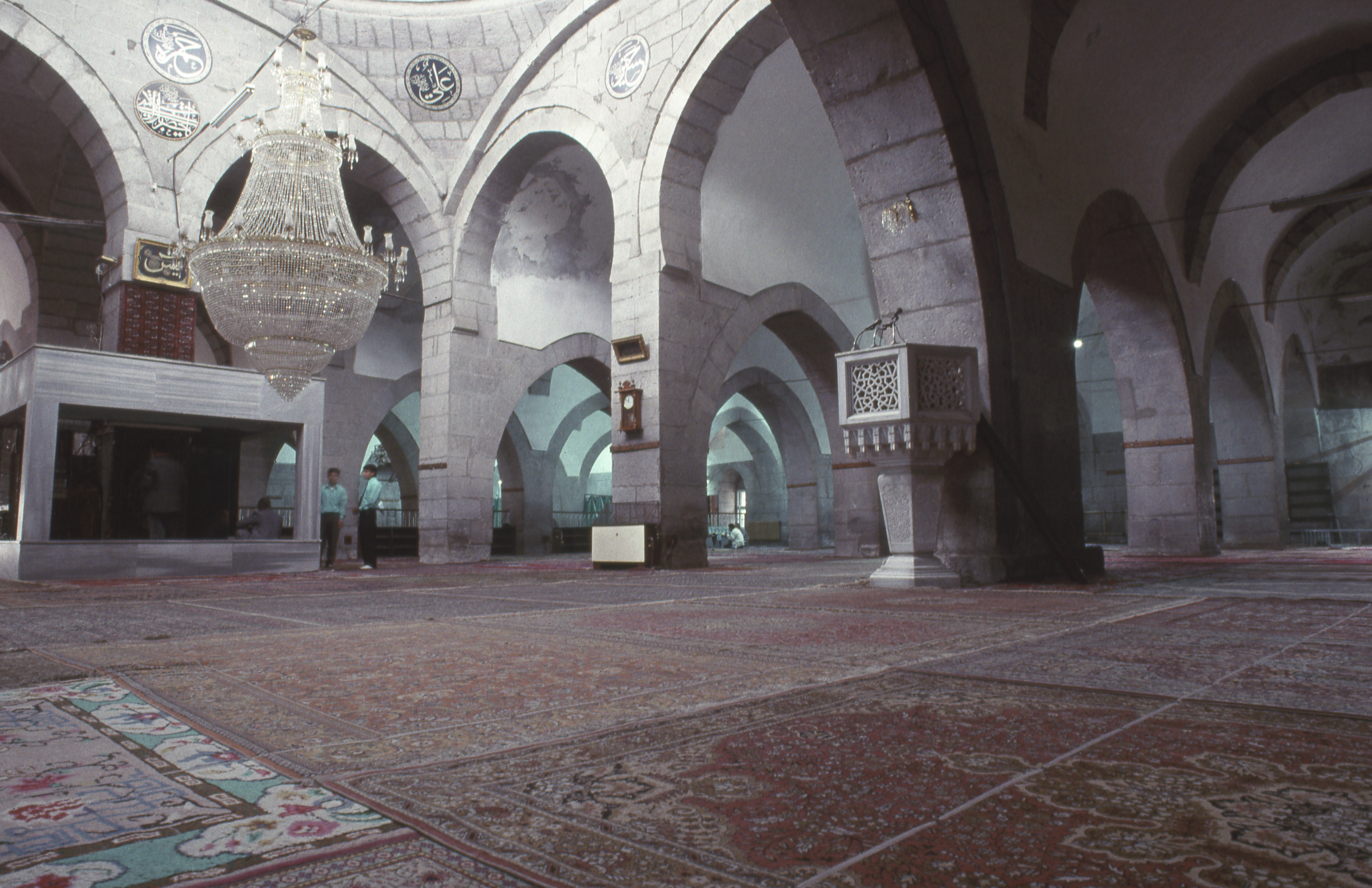
Hunat Hatun Complex Interior mosque

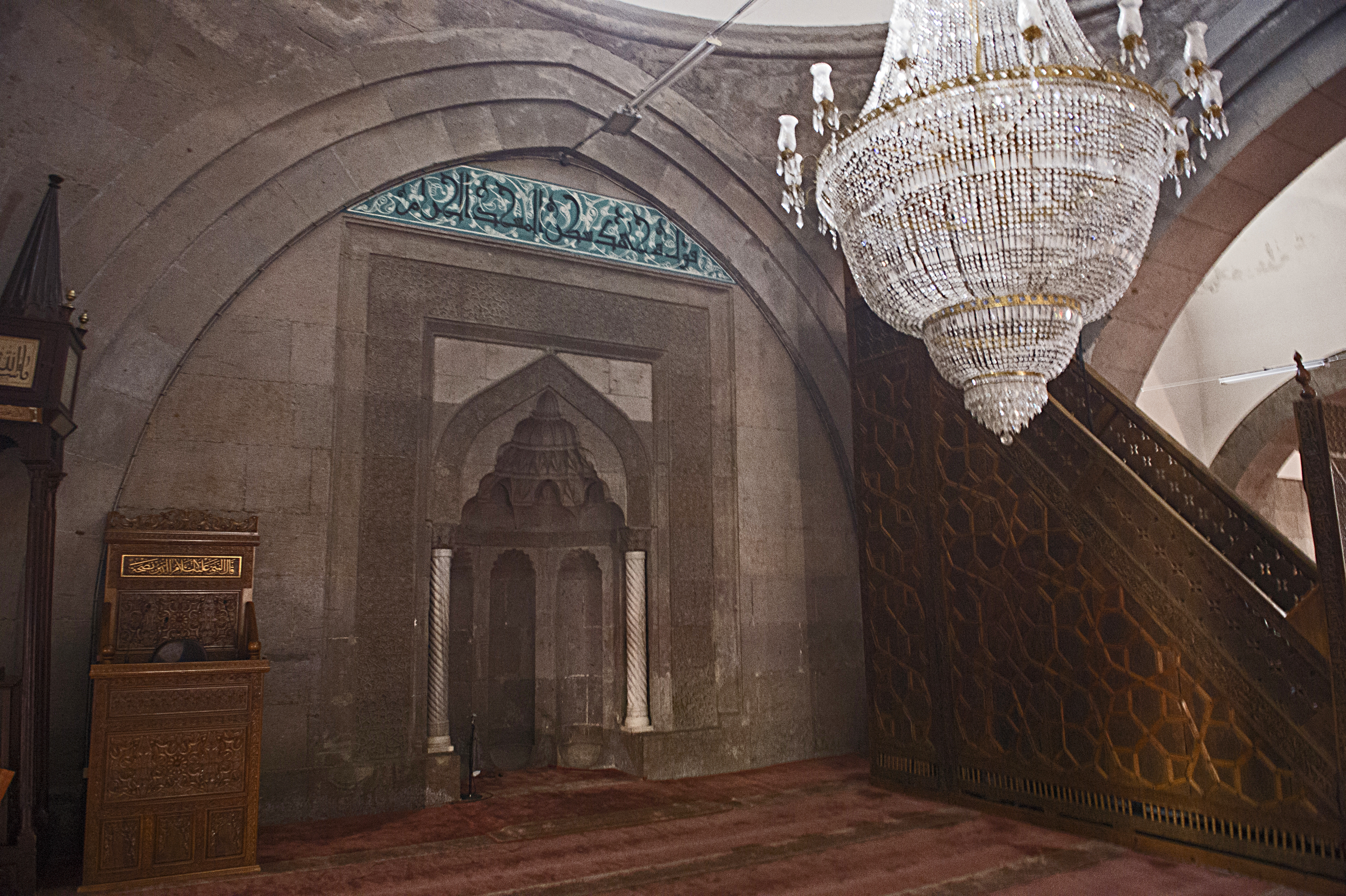
Hunat Hatun Complex Interior mosque minber and mihrab

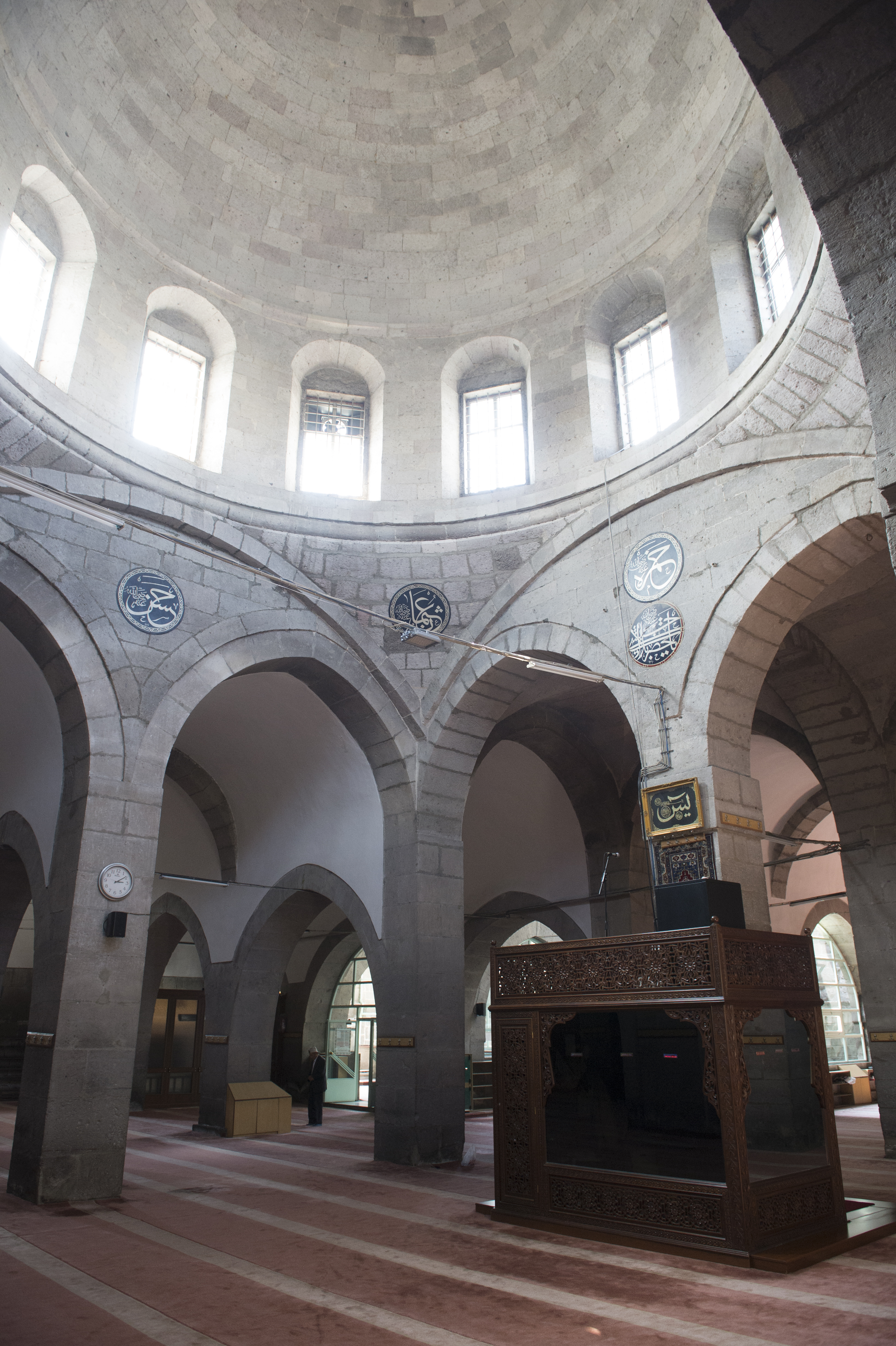
Hunat Hatun Complex Interior mosque central dome

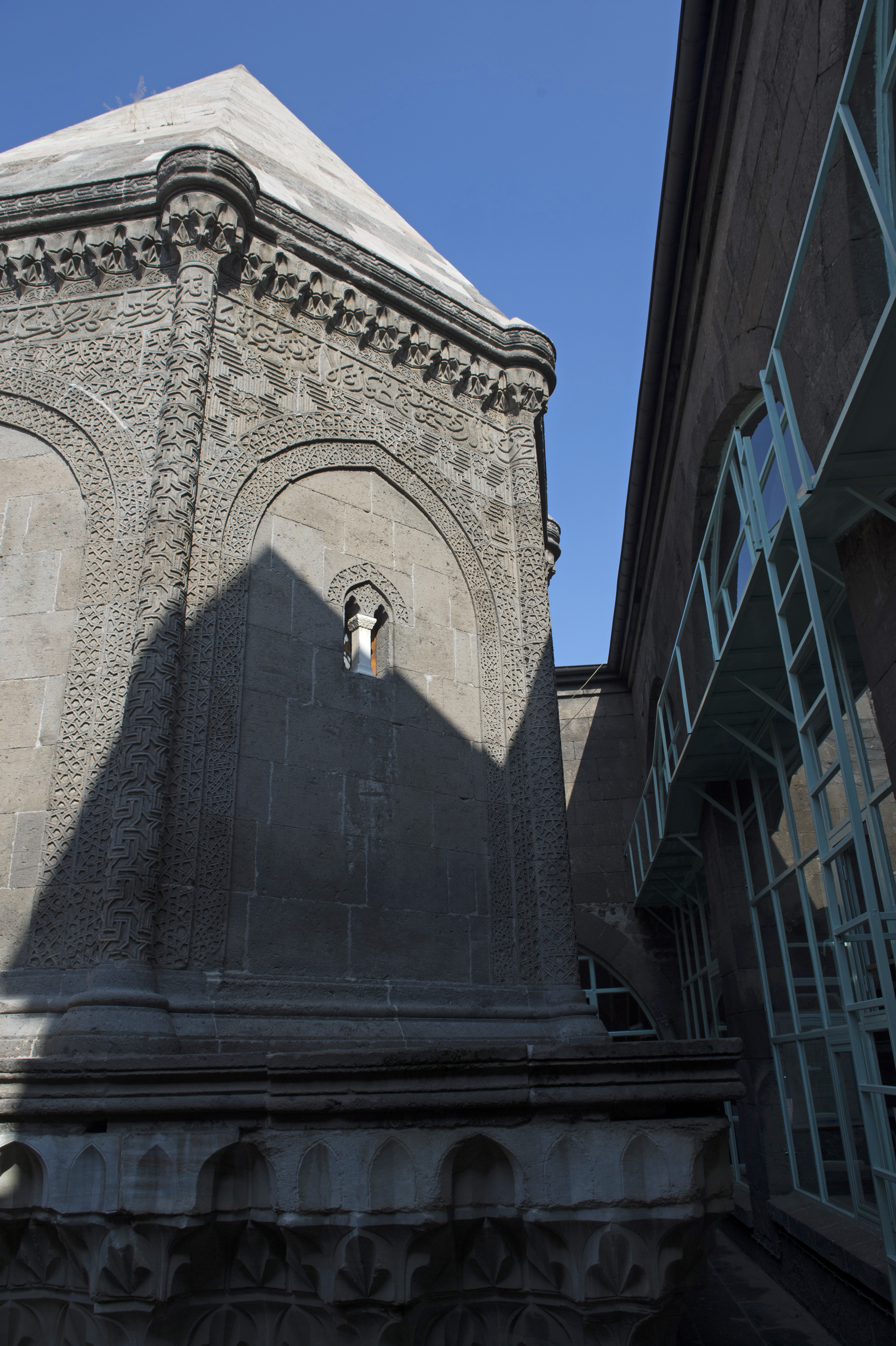
Hunat Hatun Complex Mausoleum

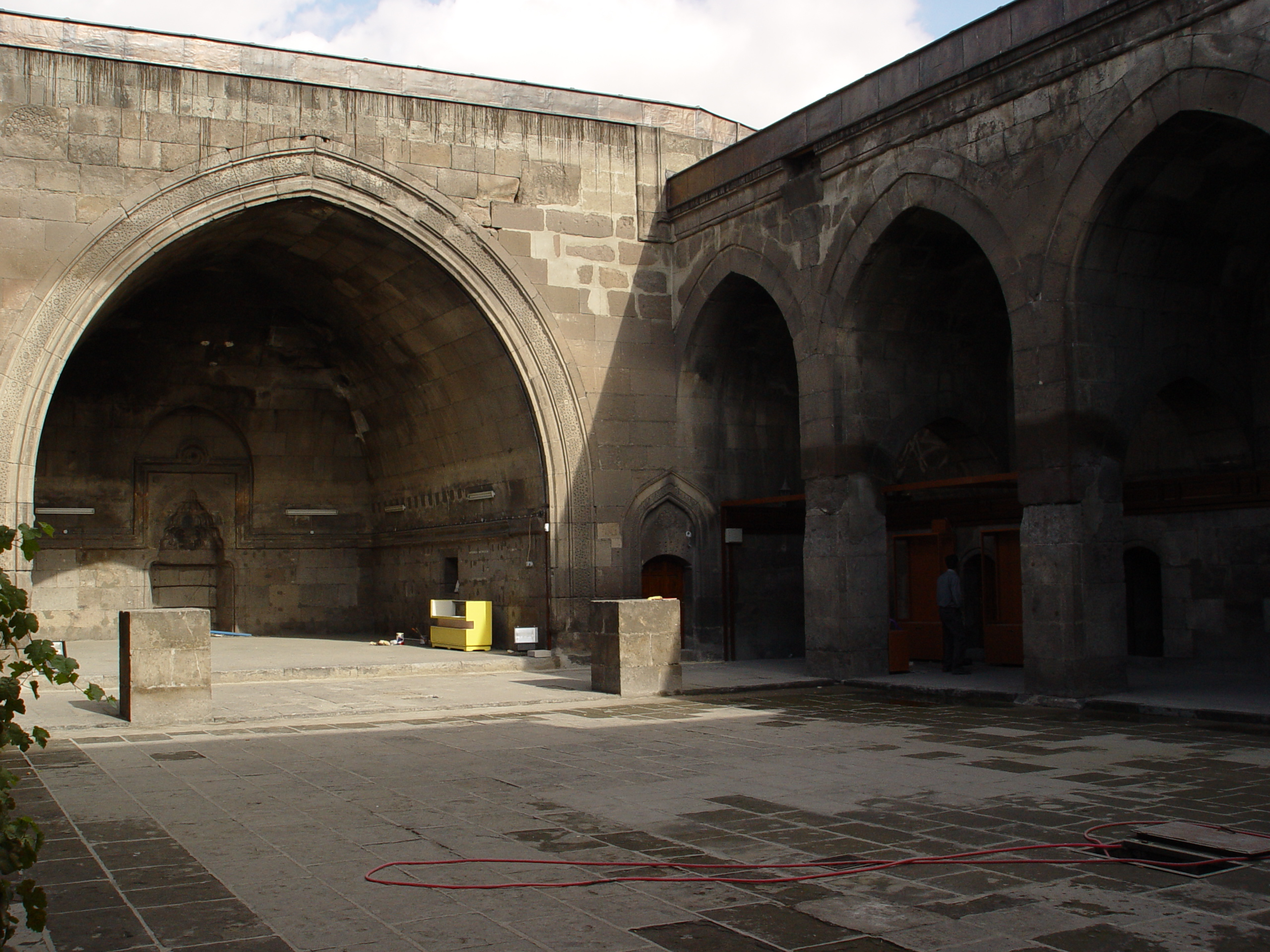
Hunat Hatun Complex Medrese
