= Yavlak Arslan =

Bey of the Chobanids

- Bey of Choban

3rd Bey of the Çobanoğulları
- Reign: 1280 – 1292
- Predecessor: Alp Yürek
- Successor: Mahmud Bey

Muzaffer al-Din Yavlak Arslan (Ottoman Turkish: امیر مظفر الدين يولق آرسلان بن الپيورك) was the third bey of the Chobanids. In Selçukname, he is referred to as Melik Muzaffer al-Din.

== Reign ==
It was understood that the task of protecting the Seljuk-Byzantine border from the Byzantines in northwest Anatolia belonged to the Chobanids.

=== Early years ===
Although the Chobanids lived fairly peacefully in Arslan's early reign, other principalities definitely didn't. Anatolia was in a state of turmoil due to throne changes and the chaos of the Ilkhanate Mongols however Yavlak Arslan elected to continue with his father's policy of loyalty to the Ilkhanate.

=== Death ===
In 1292, the leader of the Ilkhanate, Arghun Khan, died and was succeeded by his brother Gaykhatu. The Turks of Anatolia led a revolution. Seeing the opportunity, the vassalised Seljuk Sultan, Mesud II's brother Kilij Arslan V, rebelled against his brother. When Gaykhatu came to Anatolia with his army, Kilij Arslan moved to Yavlak Arslan's capital, Kastamonu, and organized the Turkmens there. Muzaffer al-Din Yavlak Arslan's side in this rebellion is mixed. Although he wrote that he opposed Mesud and Kilij Arslan organised the Turkmen in Kastamonu, some sources wrote that Muzaffereddin Yavlak Arslan opposed Kılıçarslan and was killed by him.

As a result, Muzaffer al-Din Yavlak Arslan was killed during the rebellion, and the region was given to the Seljuk senior commander Shams al-Din Yaman Jandar, whose descendants were to found the Principality of Candar in the same region. His grave is thought to be in Aşköprü or Kastamonu.

== In popular culture ==
In the Turkish TV series, Kuruluş: Osman, he is portrayed by the Turkish actor Umut Karadağ. A historian was concerned over the fact that such an important and great person from history was being portrayed in a negative way, but Mehmet Bozdağ, the producer of the series, assured him that after a few episodes, Yavlak Arslan will end up becoming a 'real hero'. Later on, Mehmet's claims turned out to be correct.

Regnal titles
Preceded by Alp Yürek	Bey of Choban; 1280–1292	Succeeded by Mahmud Bey
