= Mahpari Khatun =

Mahpari Huand Khatun
- Safwat al-Dunyā wa'l-Dīn
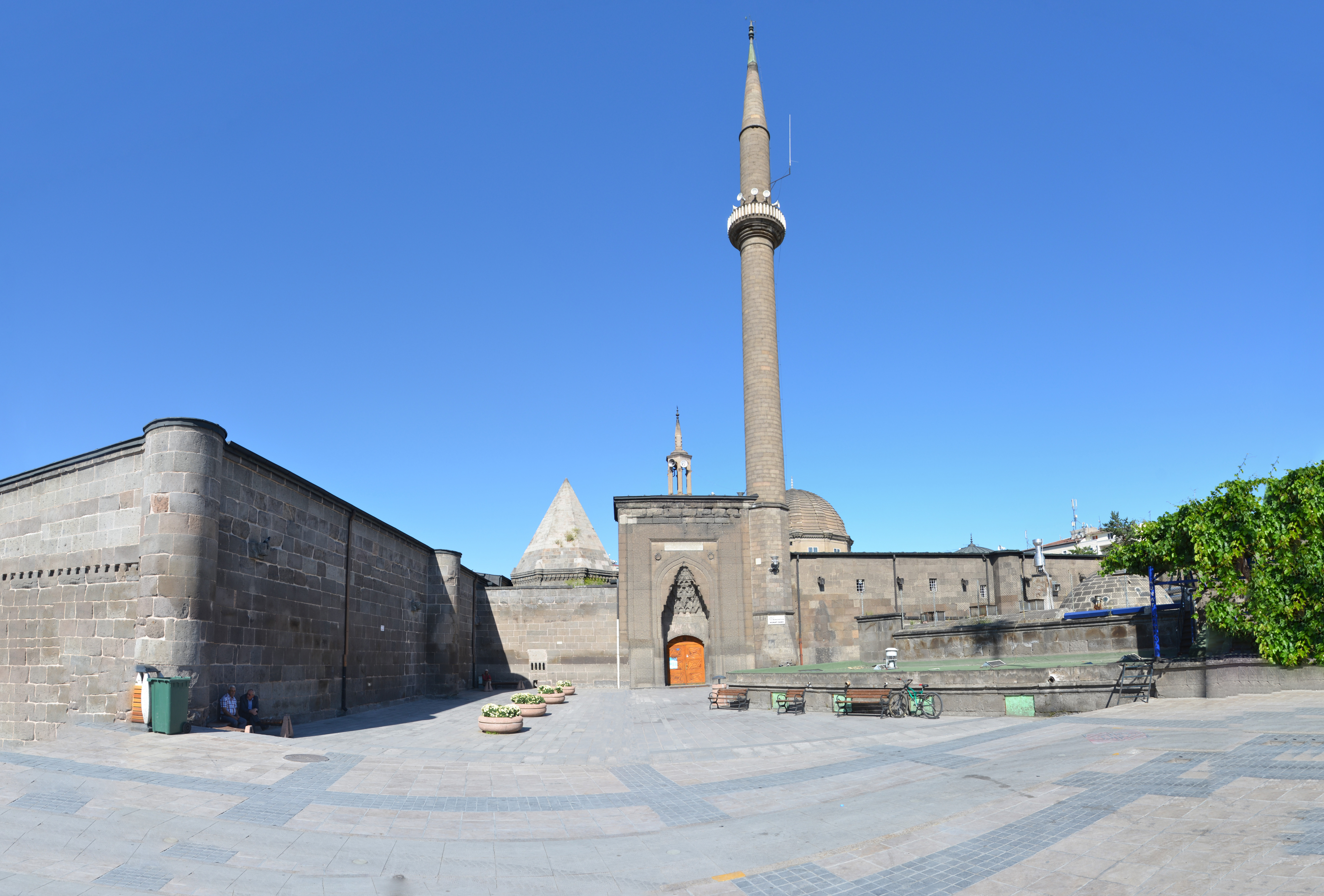
- Hunat Hatun Complex
- Born: c. 1201
- Died: between 1254 and 1284
- Burial: Hunat Khatun Tomb
- Spouse: Kayqubad I (m. 1221)
- Issue: Kaykhusraw II
- Dynasty: Seljuk dynasty (by marriage)
- Father: Kir Vard
- Religion: Christianity (by birth); Islam (conversion)

Mahpari Khatun (Turkish: Mahperi Hatun; Persian: ماه‌پری خاتون), also known as Khwand Khatun, Huand Khatun or Hunad Khatun (Turkish: Hunad Hatun, Hunat Hatun; Persian: خوَند خاتون) was the wife of Kayqubad I and the mother of Kaykhusraw II. She commissioned madrasas, soup kitchens, and many other works in various parts of Anatolia. A large complex bearing her name is located in Kayseri.

== Life ==
The ethnic origin of Mahpari Huand Khatun is disputed. Some historians believe that she was Greek, while others believe that she was Armenian. Huand Khatun's father was Kir Vard, the ruler of Kalonoros (Alanya) Castle near Antalya. Although some sources identify her father as the son of an Armenian notable named Adom, the title "Kir" (kyr) indicates that he was in Byzantine service. Her uncle was the ruler of Alara Castle.

In 1146, Byzantium, which had besieged but failed to capture Konya, withdrew its authority from Anatolia; following the Battle of Myriokephalon and the Fourth Crusade, its connection with the Mediterranean coast was severed, and cities that acted independently in the Mediterranean emerged. When Byzantium withdrew its authority from the region, her father Kir Vard, the ruler of Kalonoros Castle, also began to act independently; he was almost like the spiritual leader of the region. Kayqubad I besieged Alanya, and Kir Vard sent Kayqubad a letter expressing his desire to make an agreement. The letter stated, "If I am granted protection and a place where I can spend the rest of my life in your country, it would be a great favor." Kayqubad I accepted Kir Vard's offer and replied, "If, as proof of your loyalty, he offers one of his family members to our kinship, our assurance concerning him will be strengthened." Thereupon, Kir Vard sent his daughter to Kayqubad I as a wife. Kir Vard, who handed over the castle to him, was granted Akşehir and two villages as property.

=== Marriage ===
The princess's name before her marriage is said to have been Destina. This name was probably a corrupted form of the Greek title "Despina" (lady). After her marriage, she was given the name Mahpari. The title Huand (Hond) given to her means "Lord" or "ruler" in Persian; therefore, the expression Huand Khatun is a literal translation of the title Despina. In recent times, it was popularly transformed into "Hunat", replacing her original name. It is understood from a letter written by her son Kaykhusraw II to the Latin emperor Baldwin in Constantinople that she remained Christian after her marriage until her husband's death.

Hunad Mahpari Khatun, who spent most of her life at the Keykubadiye Palace in Kayseri, had a son named Kaykhusraw II from her marriage to Sultan Kayqubad I. Kayqubad contracted a second marriage with Malika Adila (Gaziye Khatun), daughter of the Ayyubid ruler of Egypt, al-Malik al-Adil, and had two daughters and two sons from this marriage; in 1237, he declared his middle son Izz al-Din Kilij Arslan heir. When the sultan suddenly died, allegedly by poisoning, shortly afterward, a major struggle took place between the two sultan's wives to place their own sons at the head of the state. With the assistance of the viziers and emirs of the period, especially Sa'd al-Din Köpek, Hunat Khatun won the struggle, and her son Kaykhusraw II was placed on the Anatolian Seljuk throne. At the end of the struggle for the throne, Malika Adila was killed in Ankara Castle, while her sons were imprisoned in Borgulu Castle and subsequently ordered to be killed, and her daughters were removed from Anatolia. Some historians, based on subsequent events, have suspected that Kayqubad's poisoning may have involved his eldest son Kaykhusraw, the emirs close to him, and Hunat Khatun.

It is generally understood that Hunat Khatun converted to Islam at the beginning of her son's reign and devoted herself to charitable works. In Kayseri, she commissioned the Hunat Hatun Complex, which bears her name. Among the structures in the complex, consisting of a madrasa, mosque, tomb, and bathhouse, the mosque's inscription states that it was built in 635 AH (1238 in the Gregorian calendar). Some historians have interpreted Hunat Khatun's conversion to Islam and patronage of religious buildings as an attempt to distance herself from or erase her Christian past and refashion her identity as a Muslim queen; however, there is no concrete evidence establishing this as her motivation.

There is also a popular legend that attributes Hunat Khatun's conversion to Islam to Sheikh Turasan Veli, for whom she had a lodge built on Tekke Mountain in İncesu and to whom she donated the extensive surrounding land as a charitable endowment.

When the Mongols captured Kayseri in 1243, she fled with her daughter-in-law Gurju Khatun and granddaughter Seljuk Khatun and took refuge in a small Armenian kingdom in Adana; however, she was handed over to the Mongols by the Armenians.

=== Tomb ===
Her tomb is located in the Hunat Hatun Complex. Her tomb does not state her date of death. However, based on the inscription on her sarcophagus, which reads "...the late and martyred Ghiyath al-Din Kaykhusraw ibn Kayqubād's mother Mahpari Khatun," she is thought to have been alive in 1246, when her son was martyred. In addition, Ibn Bibi's accounts state that she was alive in 1254, when the vizier Jalal al-Din Qaratay died.

It is thought that she had the tomb within the complex in Kayseri built during her lifetime. Because of her former Christian identity and her husband's controversial death, she is thought to have acted cautiously politically and stayed away from the capital, Konya. She concentrated her construction activities not only in Kayseri but also around Tokat, Amasya, Yozgat, and Sivas. She had large-scale caravanserais built in these areas. Her title appears in inscriptions as "Safwat al-Dunyā wa’l-Dīn Mah-Peri Khātūn" (the pride of religion and the world). Such expressions were reserved for rulers; women's names did not follow the title "Safwat al-Dunyā wa’l-Dīn". The use of the name Mahpari Khatun with this title indicates that she wielded considerable power during her son's reign.
