= Husam al-Din Choban =

13th century commander

Husam al-Din Choban was a commander and bey in the Sultanate of Rum in the early 13th century.

== During Keykavus term ==
He was probably a member of the Kayı tribe which is known as the founder of the Ottoman Empire (in the next century). According to Ibn Bibi he was the governor of Kastamonu in 1211–1212 period. He was active in the Black Sea region, and especially in the domains of Empire of Trebizond. He was present in the peace talks between Keykavus I and Keykubat I, two Seljuk princes fighting for the throne.

== During Keykubat term ==
Choban's greatest success was his Crimean campaign. In 1214 the Black Sea port of Sinop was captured by the Seljuks. Main trade route was between Sinop was Sudak in Cremea. But after the Mongol invasions Kypchak control on Sudak was weakened and the Seljuk-Kypcack trade suffered. Keykubat assigned Choban as the commander of the sea campaign to Sudak in 1223. Choban captured the city and the Kypchacks declared their loyalty to Keykubat. He returned to Sinop in 1224.

According to Selçukname the history book written by Yazıcıoğlu Ali, an Ottoman historian of the early 15th century, when Keykubat travelled to east to take precautions against a possible Mongol invasion, his regent in west Anatolia was Husam al-Din Choban with Ertuğrul (father of Osman I of the Ottoman Empire) and his brother being his subordinates.

== The beylik ==
In historical documents his name is not mentioned after the campaign to Sudak. But his son Alp Yürek emerged as the founder of a beylik named Çobanoğulları.

== Sources ==
- Yücel, Yaşar; Sevim, Ali (1990). Türkiye Tarihi Cilt I. Ankara: AKDTYK Yayınları.
