= Kir Fard =

Nobleman

Kir Fard was a Byzantine or Armenian Roupenian nobleman who held the fortress of Kalonoros, later known as Alanya, until 1221, when it was besieged by the Seljuq Sultan Alaeddin Keykubad I. He surrendered his fortress in exchange for the fief of Akşehir, and gave his daughter Hunat Khatun in marriage to Keyqubad, who later fathered Kaykhusraw II.
