= Mahmud Bey =

Bey of the Chobanids

- Bey of Choban

4th Bey of the Çobanoğulları
- Reign: 1292 – 1309
- Predecessor: Muzaffer al-Din Yavlak Arslan
- Successor: End of Beylik of Choban

Çobanoğlu Mahmud Bey was the fourth and final bey of the Chobanids.

== Reign ==
During Mahmud's reign, the raids on the Byzantine borders continued. The leadership of these raids was taken by his brother Ali Bey. Ali Bey crossed the Sakarya River during his raids but later signed a treaty with the Byzantines. With this agreement, the Turkmen gathered around Osman Bey of the nascent Ottoman Empire. This switching of sides by the Turkomans further weakened the influence and power of Çobanli Mahmud Bey.

In 1309, Suleyman Pasha of the Beylik of Isfendiyar raided Mahmut Beg's palace and killed him. After this event, the Beylik of Choban was absorbed by the Isfendiyarids

Regnal titles
Preceded by Yavlak Arslan	Bey of Choban; 1292–1309	Succeeded by Position Abolished
