= Husam al-Din Qaraja =

Governor of Sivas in the Sultanate of Rum

- Known for: The assassination of Sa'd al-Din Kopek
- Opponent: Sa'd al-Din Köpek

Husam al-Din Qaraja (Turkish: Hüsameddin Karaca) was the Governor of Sivas in the Seljuk Sultanate of Rum and most commonly known as the man who got rid of the rogue Emir Sa'd al-Din Köpek.

== Disposing of Emir Sa’d al-Din Köpek ==
Qaraja was not really related to the Seljuk court's politics but when Kaykhusraw II realised that Köpek wanted the Seljuk throne, he sent a loyal servant of his to make contact with Qaraja, and mention to him about the evil plans of Sa'd al-Din Köpek.

=== Qaraja's cunningness ===
Köpek was in fact afraid of Husam al-Din Qaraja and tried to keep away from him, Qaraja knew how Sa'd al-Din felt towards him so he was very cautious while attempting to gain his trust in order to kill him. At one point, Husam al-Din Qaraja requested permission to see the Sultan in his palace. Köpek inquired why he asked for his permission. Husam al-Din Qaraja responded:

“how can I go afore the Sultan without your permission?”

He now had Sa'd's trust with these words which also showed how cunning Qaraja was and he became his assistant and attendant. Qaraja also decided to attend some of his parties and dinners for a few days which built more trust in Köpek for him.

=== The end of Köpek ===
Keyhüsrev II, also told Qaraja about his plans and after a few days held a feast at his palace. In the feast, Husam al-Din Qaraja left and said that he was going to the bathroom when he actually was waiting outside the palace door. Sa'd al-Din Köpek also went because he was feeling sick after he was given some poison. When he went out, he saw Husam al-Din Qaraja and his men, and after Qaraja failed to kill him and only cut off some of his face, he ran out of the palace recovering really fast. Emir-i Âlem, the Emir responsible for Seljuk's standards, Togan, who was with Husam al-Din Qaraja at that moment, took out his sword and ran after Köpek. There, he was attacked by people who supported Sa'd al-Din and were waiting in the cellar in which Köpek was hiding. Togan was wounded very severely with knives and swords before he and Qaraja caught up with Köpek and finally finished him off.

== In popular culture ==
Qaraja and Emir-i Âlem Togan were also characters in the Turkish TV series, Diriliş: Ertuğrul where they helped the protagonist, Ertuğrul, kill Sa'd al-Din Köpek.

== See also ==
- Shams al-Din Altınapa
