= Kayqubadiyya Palace =

Palace in Turkey

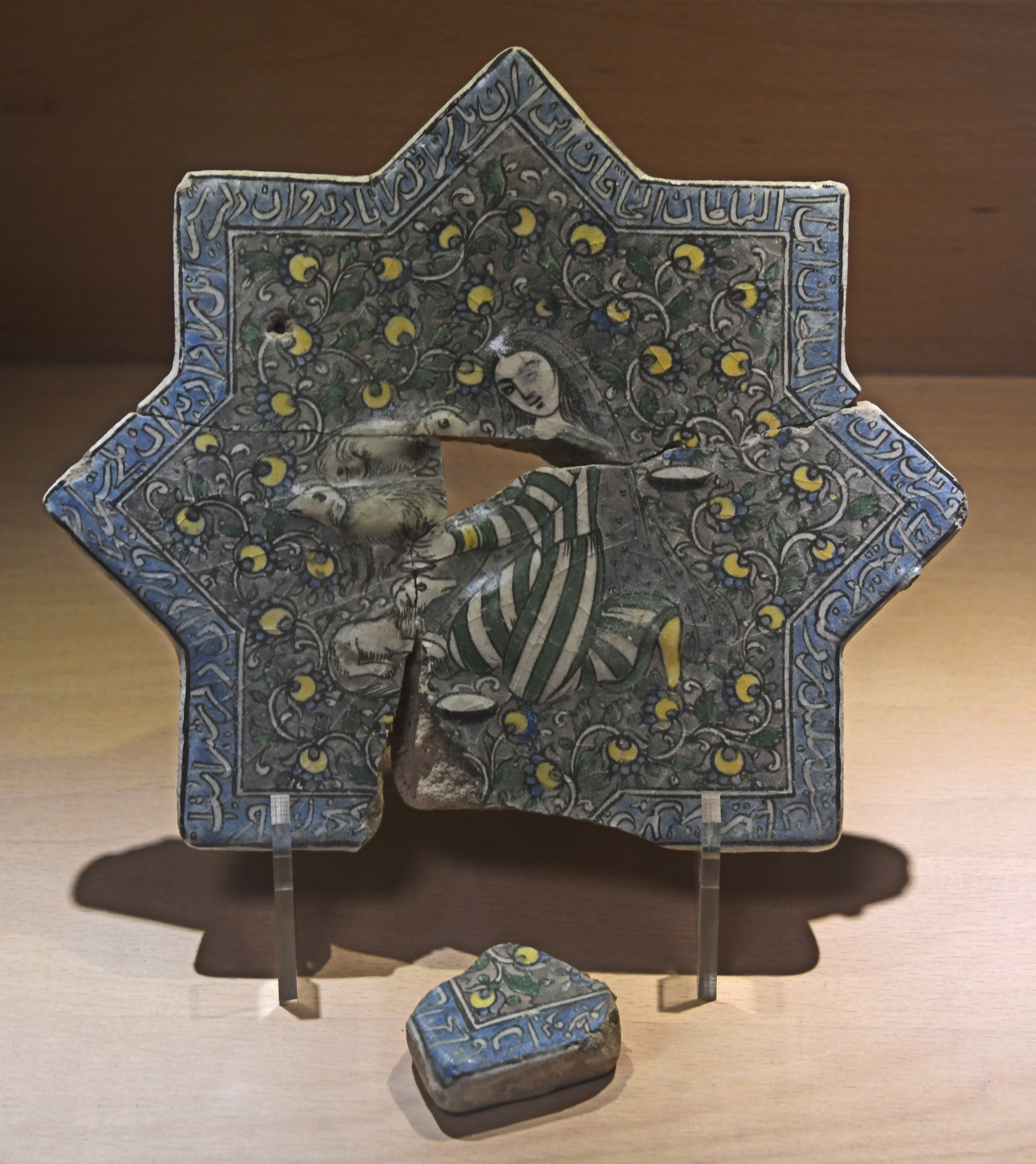
Tile from Keykumbadiye Palace

Kayqubadiyya, was a palace built by the Seljuk Sultan of Rum, Kayqubad I, between 1224 and 1226. Located northwest of Kayseri, the place is now called Kiybad Ciftligi and sits near the plain of Mashhad. As a place to review the troops, the road, which proceeds past the palace, has been in use since pre-Roman times.

The palace was the favorite residence of Kayqubad I, and it was here that he received the capitulation of Malik al-Din Dawudshah, lord of Erzincan. In 1237, Kayqubad was holding a banquet at Kayqubadiyya, where he was poisoned and subsequently died. His son, Kaykhusraw II would ascend the throne at Kayqubadiyya, following the execution of his brothers, Rukn al-Din and Kilic Arslan.

The palace was just one of many architectural foundations and monuments whose construction was initiated by Kayqubad I. The site was excavated in 1964.

== Sources ==
- Busse, H. (1997). "Kaykubadiyya". In Van Donzel, E.; Lewis, B.; Pellat, Ch. (eds.). The Encyclopaedia of Islam. Vol. IV. Brill. p. 818. ISBN 978-90-04-08114-7.
- Eastmond, Antony (2017). Tamta's World. Cambridge University Press. p. 197. ISBN 978-11-07-16756-8.
- Lambton, Ann K.S.; Lewis, Bernard (1977). The Cambridge History of Islam: The Central Islamic lands since 1918. Vol. 1B. Cambridge University Press. p. 248. ISBN 978-052-129-135-4.
