= Oghuznameh =

Historical books of Oghuz Turkic legends

Oghuznameh (Ottoman Turkish and Persian: اوغوزنامه, lit. 'The Book of the Oghuz', also romanized as Oghuz-nameh, Oghuz Nāmeh, Oghuzname), is a generic term that is applied to the oral and written legendary accounts of Oghuz Khagan and Oghuz Turks. According to the TDV Encyclopedia of Islam the number of Oghuznamehs may be as high as 30. The Book of Dede Korkut, Selçukname and Shajara-i Tarākima are among the well-known Oghuznamehs. Oghuznamehs were also historically performed by travelling story-tellers, or oral repositories (in Ottoman Turkish: اوزان, romanized: ozan).

== Jāmiʿ al-Tawārīkh ==
One of the most important Oghuznamehs is Jāmiʿ al-Tawārīkh by Rashid-al-Din Hamadani. According to Ümit Hassan the legends can be classified under five sections:

- Oghuz Khagan
- Yabghus of Oghuz people
- Kara Khagan and Bugra Khagan
- Shah Malik and Seljuks
- Some Turkic families
