= Alp Yürek =

Bey of the Chobanids

- Bey of Choban

2nd Bey of the Çobanoğulları
- Reign: 1240 – 1280
- Predecessor: Hüsamettin Çoban
- Successor: Yavlak Arslan

Alp Yürek was the second bey of the Chobanids.

== Reign ==
It is thought that the period of his reign was short and there was no significant development in the Principality during this time. The reason for this silence can be cited as the fact that the Chobanids, after the Battle of Kösedağ, did not cause any problems to the new ruler of Anatolia, the Ilkhanate, and accepted to pay taxes to them. Although it is not known when and how Alp Yurek died, it can be accepted that he died in a war since he is referred to as a martyr in the sources. After him, his son Muzaffereddin Yavlak Arslan became the head of the principality.

Regnal titles
Preceded by Hüsamettin Çoban	Bey of Choban; 1240–1280	Succeeded by Yavlak Arslan
