= Sa'd al-Din Köpek =

Seljuk court administrator (died 1238)

Saad-Al'Din Köpek
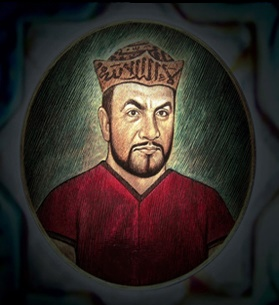
- A portrait of Sa'd al-Din Köpek
- Died: 1238
- Cause of death: Assassinated on orders of Sultan Kaykhusraw II
- Burial place: Ilgın, Konya
- Other names: Sa'd al-Dīn Kobek bin Muḥammad; Köpek bin Muḥammad; Sâdeddin Köpek Pervâne
- Occupations: Vizier; Court administrator
- Known for: Attempt to become the Sultan of the Seljuk Sultanate of Rum
- Title: Emir-i Şikâr; Nakkaş; Emir-i Bâdghāh; Pervâne; Melikü'l-Ümerâ
- Opponent: Ertuğrul

Sa’d al-Din Köpek (Arabic: سعد الدين كوبك بن محمد, Sa’d al-Dīn Kobek bin Muhammad; Turkish: Sadettin Köpek, died 1238) was a court administrator under two 13th century Seljuq Sultans of Rum and is known for his indirect role in the subjugation of the Sultanate of Rum by the Mongol Empire due to his disloyalty and aim for greater power during the turbulent 13th century in Anatolia.

He served as Master of the Hunt and Minister of Works under Kayqubad I and, after in the latter capacity, supervised the construction of Kubadabad Palace on the shore of Lake Beyşehir.

== Biography ==
Köpek, as an advisor to Kayqubad's successor Kaykhusraw II, grew his influence considerably. His first aim was to secure the reign of the new sultan. He had Kaykhusraw's two half-brothers strangled along with their mother, an Ayyubid princess, but he did not become successful, was later killed by Husam al-Din Qaraja, and was hanged on the Seljuk palace walls for treason. It was also known that he wanted the throne of the Seljuks and had made his connections with Mongols. He also had a clash with Ertugrul (father of Osman I) of the Kayi tribe. Köpek wanted to kill Ertugrul to make his path clear, but he failed to do so and was held in Seljuk court, where Ertugrul and Husam al-Din Qaraja were the only two who pointed fingers on his loyality. He suspected the loyalty of the Khwarazmiyya, the remnant followers of Jalal al-Din Mangburni whom Kayqubad had installed in various Anatolian fortresses, and had their leader, a certain Kirkhan, imprisoned. The Khwarazmiyya abandoned their posts and fled to Diyar Mudar, where they applied to the Ayyubids for work as mercenaries. Köpek's suspicion deprived the sultanate of seasoned soldiers at a time of external threat and internal instability.

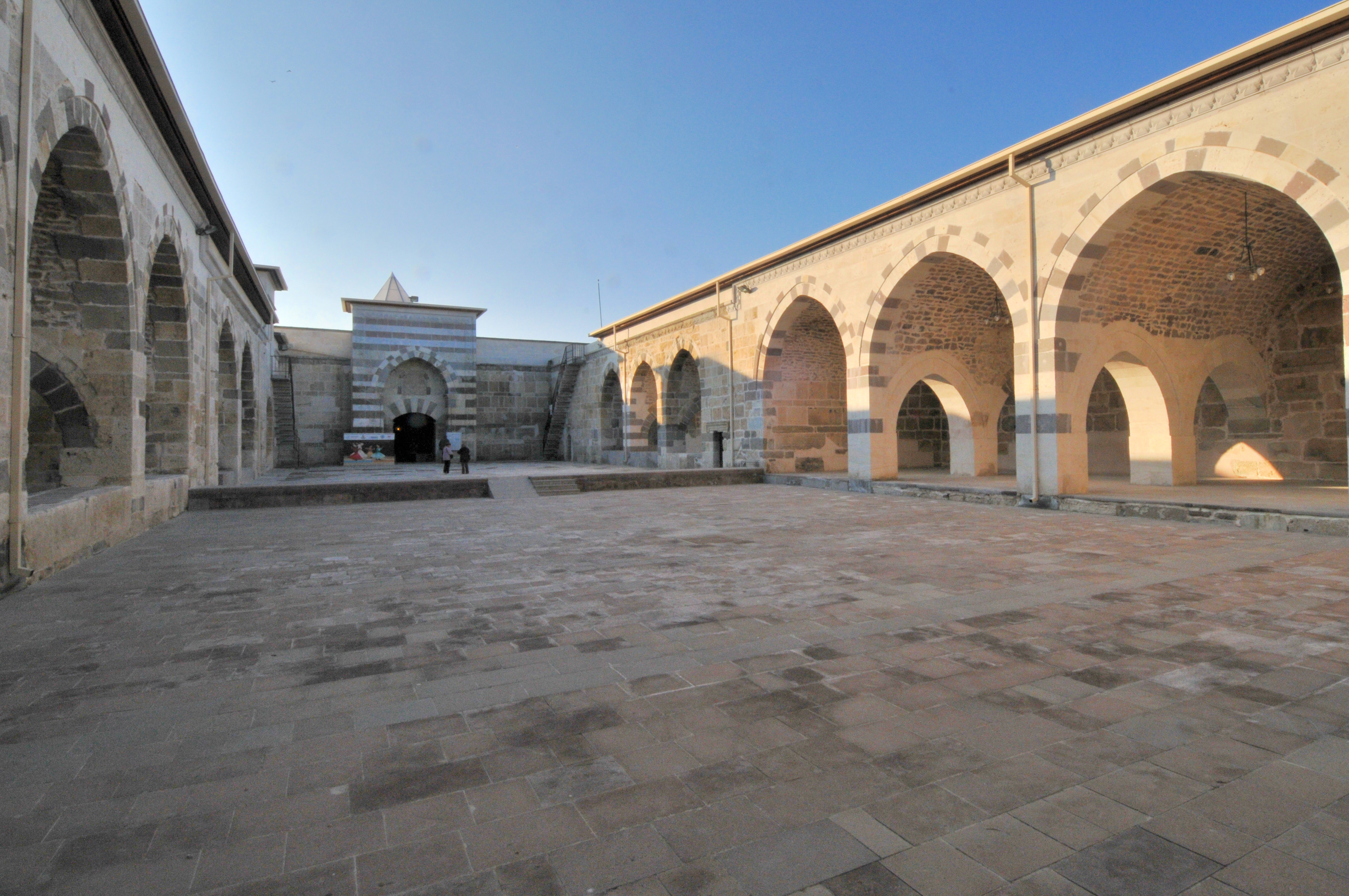
'Zazadin Han' built by Sa'd al-Din Köpek

A caravanserai built by Sa’d al-Din Köpek from 1235 to 1237 survives about 22 kilometres (14 mi) from Konya on the road to Aksaray. Known as Zazadin Han, the caravanserai bears two inscriptions: one naming Köpek as founder and dated 1235–36, the other indicating the patronage of both Kayqubad I and Kaykhusraw II.

== In popular culture ==
In the Turkish television series, Diriliş: Ertuğrul, Sa’d al-Din Köpek is portrayed by Turkish actor, Murat Garipağaoğlu. In the series, Sa’d al-Din Köpek's name is in Turkish, as The Amir Sadettin Köpek, and is shown as a traitor and is eventually beheaded by the protagonist, Ertuğrul.

== Sources ==
- Claude Cahen, Pre-Ottoman Turkey: A general survey of the material and spiritual culture and history c. 1071-1330 (Taplinger: New York 1968), 133–34.
- Carole Hillenbrand, “Sa’d al-Dīn Köpek b. Muhammad” Encyclopaedia of Islam, ed. by P. Bearman, et al. (Brill 2007).
- Sâdeddin Köpek(in Turkish) — An article published in the 35th Volume of TDV İslâm Ansiklopedisi, pp. 392–393, in Istanbul (2008)
