= Selçukname =

Informal term for medieval chronicles on Seljuk history

Selçukname is an informal term used for any of a number of medieval chronicles about Seljuk history written by different authors, mostly in Persian. It is also used for the 15th century Ottoman chronicle Tevârih-i Âl-i Selçuk (History of the House of Seljuk, also called Oğuznâme-Selçuklu târihi by some Turkish language sources, Ottoman Turkish: تاريخ آل سلچوق, romanized: Târih-i Âl-i Selçuk). The Ottoman chronicle, written by Yazıcıoğlu Ali in Ottoman Turkish, is the only official history of the Imperial Court from Murad II's reign and serves to establish a narrative of the Ottoman dynasty's claim of descent through the Seljuks.

== Selçukname of ibn Bibi (13th century) ==
Ibn Bibi was born as the son of refugees from Khwarazm and Khorasan who had fled their native lands following the death of the last Khwarazmshah of the Anushtegin dynasty, Jalal al-Din Mangburni, in August 1231. Ibn Bibi attained a high position in the Sultanate of Rum as a "seal holder" and was responsible for all Seljuk correspondence. His mother had held a position in the Khwarazmi court as an astrologer. She had managed to find a position in the court of Sultan Kayqubad I (r. 1220–1237). Thus ibn Bibi began his service in Kayqubad I's court, which continued even after the Battle of Köse Dağ, when the Sultanate of Rum, defeated by the Mongols, became vassals of the Ilkhanate.

Historian Ali Anooshahr has proposed that ibn Bibi's chronicle of Seljuk history, the Selçukname, followed a common pattern that can be found in earlier chronicles written by medieval Persian historians Abu'l-Fadl Bayhaqi and Nizam al-Mulk. Anooshahr calls this pattern the "triad of kings", beginning with a ghazi (plural, ghuzā) founder king who lives a life of hardship as a wandering, dispossessed warrior prince who "returns" to regain his throne. The second king of the triad is a ruler over the ghuzā during a prosperous and stable era, and the third king is depicted as a debauched and inexperienced ruler who loses the kingdom to a new group of ghuzā.

== Selçukname of Yazıcıoğlu Ali (15th century) ==
=== Authorship ===
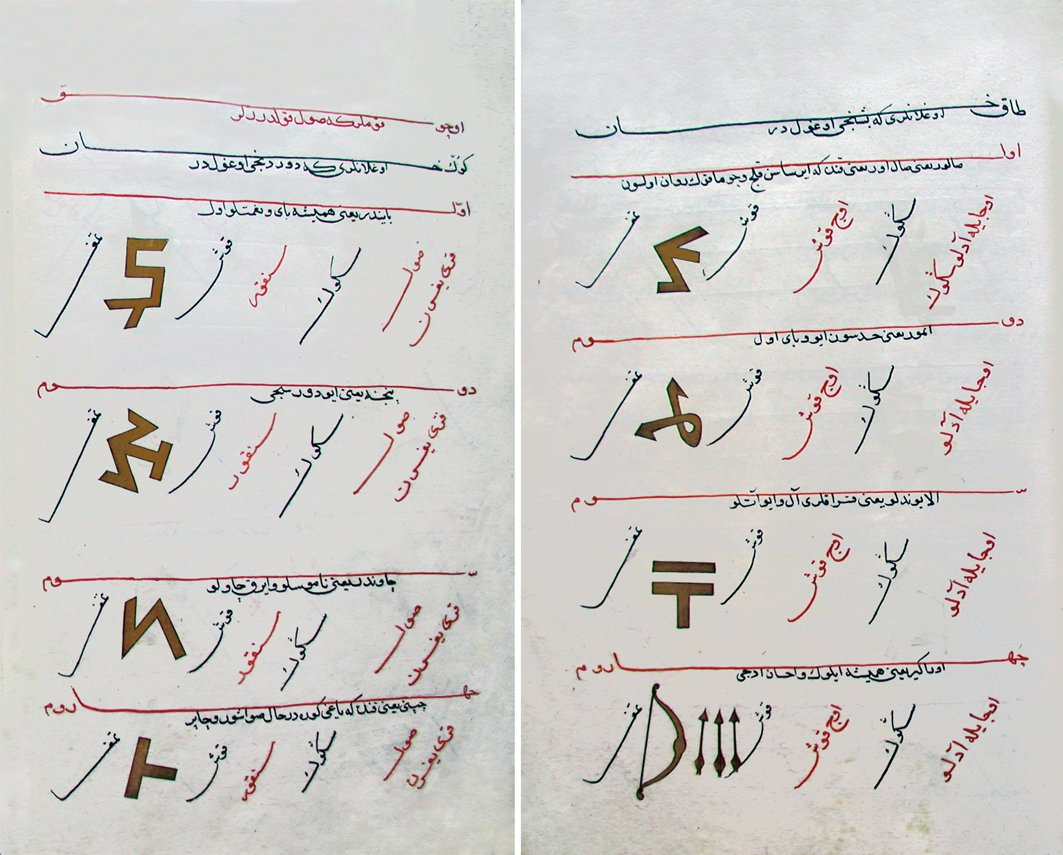
A page from Yazıcıoğlu Ali's Selçukname, listing Oghuz tamgas

The author of the 15th-century Ottoman chronicle Tevârih-i Âl-i Selçuk (تواريخ آل سلچوق) was Yazıcıoğlu Ali (literally "Ali the clerk's son"), who was a civil servant during the reign of Murad II. He was sent to the Mamluk Sultanate as an ambassador. Other than that, there is no information about his personal life. However, there were two other Yazıcıoğlu's in the same period who are thought to be his brothers, Ahmet Bican and Mehmet Bican. Their father was Selahattin from Gelibolu (now a district center of Çanakkale Province in Turkey) who was a katip "clerk" and the author of an astrology book. Since Yazıcıoğlu means "son of clerk" the supposition about Ali's family is justified.

=== Legitimacy of the Ottomans ===
In the early days of the Ottoman Empire, the Ottomans suffered from accusations about their origin. Both Kadi Burhan al-Din and Timur questioned Ottoman sovereignty in Anatolia. Kadı Burhaneddin mocked the Ottomans by using the term Kayıkçı "Boatman" instead of Kayı as the name of the Ottoman ruling house. The Ottomans tried to prove their nobility. Murad II was especially uneasy about the accusations, and Yazıcıoğlu Ali was tasked to write a book about the origin of the Ottoman family.

The Selçukname discusses briefly the Ottoman dynasty's genealogy by asserting Ottoman descent from the Sultanate of Rum. The Selçukname is the only official history of the imperial court from Murad II's reign.

=== Text ===
There are five sections. The first section concerns the pre-Islamic age of the Turkish people. In this section, Ali claims that the Ottoman dynasty is the continuation of the legendary Oghuz Khagan. Karluks, Uyghurs, and Kipchaks are also mentioned in this section. The second section is about the Seljuk Empire. The third section is a translation of ibn Bibi's book. The fourth section is about Kayqubad I (1220–1237) of the Seljuks of Rum and Osman I (1298–1326) of the Ottomans. The last section is a summary of Anatolia after the death of Ghazan of the Ilkhanate (1304).

The 15th-century Ottoman Selçukname includes a 65-line Oğuzname fragment, so scholars may occasionally use the latter term to refer to this text. Yazıcıoğlu Ali uses the term Oğuzname for earlier Old Uyghur texts. It is possible the author made use of these. These earlier texts, attested to in multiple medieval sources from the Ottoman period, have not survived into the present day. Some of the names from the Book of Dede Korkut, considered to be one genre of Oğuzname, are repeated in the Selçukname.

Ali Anooshahr has written that certain aspects of Ibn Bibi's earlier work were modernized and updated with 15th-century terminology such as top (cannonball) and tüfek ("arquebus"), whereas the original 13th century New Persian text had used the term manjaniq ("siege engine").

== See also ==
- Saljuq-nama
