= Ibn Bibi =

13th-century Persian historiographer

- ابن بی‌بی
- Born: 13th century Gorgan, Iran
- Died: 1283-1296 (exact date unknown)
- Occupations: Historian, Author

Academic work
- Era: Seljuq Sultanate of Rum
- Main interests: History
- Notable works: Selçukname

Ibn Bibi was a Persian historiographer and the author of the primary source for the history of the Seljuq Sultanate of Rum during the 13th century. He served as head of the chancellery of the Sultanate in Konya and reported on contemporary events. His best known book is Selçukname.

== Family ==
Ibn Bibi’s father, a native of Gorgan, lived for a time at the court of the Jalal al-Din Kwarezmshah and later worked at the Seljuq chancellery. His mother, Bi Bi Monajemeh Nishaburi, was a famous astrologer from Nishapur invited to Konya by Kayqubad I. The family was part of an exodus of Persian intellectuals from Mongol-dominated Iran.

== el-Evâmirü'l-Alâiyye fi'l-umûri'l-Alâiyye ==
Ibn Bibi’s memoir is written in Persian and covers the period between 1192 and 1280. A single manuscript, produced for Kaykhusraw III, survives in Istanbul (Aya Sofya 2985). An abridged Persian version called Mukhtaṣar was produced during the author's lifetime in 1284-85. An Ottoman Turkish adaptation, sometimes called the Seljukname, is included in the Oğuzname of the early 15th century court historian Yazicioğlu Ali. Several manuscripts of the latter survive in Ankara, Berlin, Istanbul, Leiden, St Petersburg, Moscow, and Paris.

H.W. Duda supplies the definitive text with a German translation in his Die Seltschukengeschichte des Ibn Bībī (Copenhagen 1959). A facsimile of Aya Sofya 2985 with an introduction by A.S. Erzi is published as El-Evāmirü'l-'Alā'iyye fī'l-Umuri'l-'Ala'iyye, Türk Tarih Kurumu Publications I, Serial No: 4a (Ankara, 1957).

== Sources ==
- H.W. Duda, “Ibn Bībī” Encyclopaedia of Islam, ed. by P. Bearman, et al. (Brill 2007).
- Andrew S. Ehrenkreutz, “Ibn Bībī” Oxford Dictionary of Byzantium (Oxford University Press 1991), v. 2, p. 973.
