= Kayqubad I =

Seljuq Turkish Sultan of Rûm

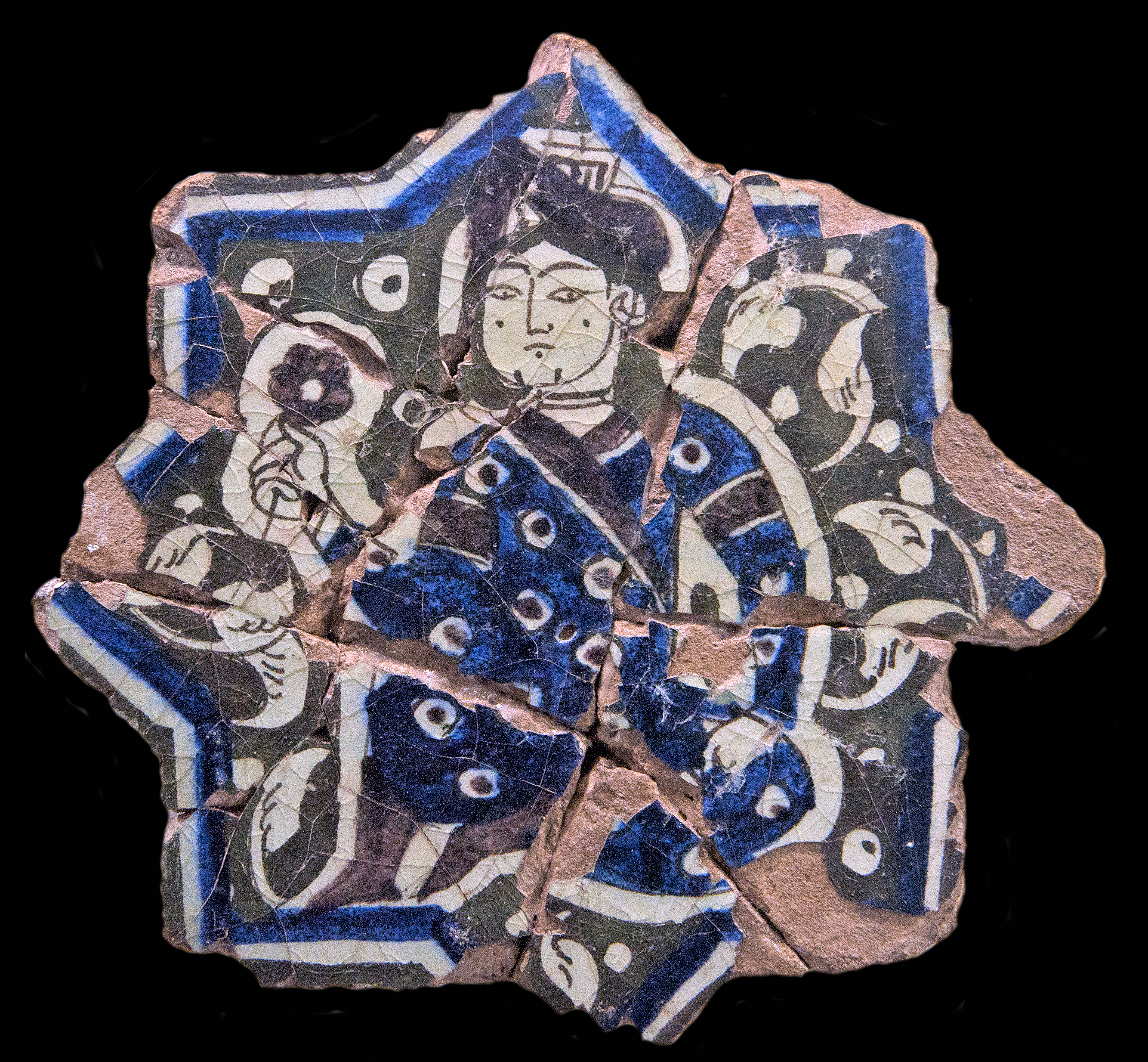
- Konya Karatay Ceramics Museum Kubad Abad Palace tile 2389. Dated to the reign of Sultan Alaeddin Kaykubad I (1226-1236)

Sultan of Rum
- Reign: 1220–1237
- Predecessor: Kaykaus I
- Successor: Kaykhusraw II
- Born: c. 1192
- Died: 1237 (aged 44–45); Kayseri, Sultanate of Rum
- Burial: Alâeddin Mosque, Konya, Turkey
- Spouse: Mahpari Hunat Khatun Malika Adila Khatun Melika Ismat al-dunya wa'l-din (daughter of Mughis ad-din Tughril Shah)
- Issue: Ghiyath al-Din Kaykhusraw II; Rukn al-Din; Kilij Arslan
Names
- Alā ad-Dīn Kayqubād bin Kaykhusraw
- Dynasty: Seljuq
- Father: Kaykhusraw I
- Religion: Sunni Islam

Alā ad-Dīn Kayqubād I (Turkish: I. Alâeddin Keykûbad; Turkish pronunciation: [kejkuːbad], Persian: علاء الدین کی‌قباد ابن کی‌خسرو; c. 1192 - 1237), also known as Kayqubad I, was the Seljuq Turkish Sultan of Rûm who reigned from 1220 to 1237. He expanded the borders of the sultanate at the expense of his neighbors, particularly the Mengujek Beylik and the Ayyubids, and established a Seljuq presence on the Mediterranean with his acquisition of the port of Kalon Oros, later renamed Ala'iyya in his honor. The sultan, sometimes styled Kayqubad the Great, is remembered today for his rich architectural legacy and the brilliant court culture that flourished under his reign.

Kayqubad's reign represented the apogee of Seljuq power and influence in Anatolia, and Kayqubad himself was considered the most illustrious prince of the dynasty. In the period following the mid-13th century Mongol invasion, inhabitants of Anatolia frequently looked back on his reign as a golden age, while the new rulers of the Anatolian beyliks sought to justify their own authority through pedigrees traced to him.

== Early life ==
Kayqubad was the second son of Seljuk Sultan Kaykhusraw, who bestowed upon him at an early age the title malik and the governorship of the important central Anatolian town of Tokat. When the sultan died following the battle of Alaşehir in 1211, both Kayqubad and his elder brother Kaykaus struggled for the throne. Kayqubad initially garnered some allies among the neighbors of the sultanate: Leo I, the king of Cilician Armenia and Tughrilshah, the brothers' uncle and the independent ruler of Erzurum. Most of the emirs, as the powerful landed aristocracy of the sultanate, supported Kaykaus. Kayqubad was forced to flee to the fortress at Ankara, where he sought aid from the Turkman tribes of Kastamonu. He was soon apprehended and imprisoned by his brother in a fortress in western Anatolia.

== Reign ==
Upon his brother Sultan Kaykaus's unexpected death in 1219/1220 Kayqubad was released from captivity and succeeded to the Seljuk throne as its new Sultan.

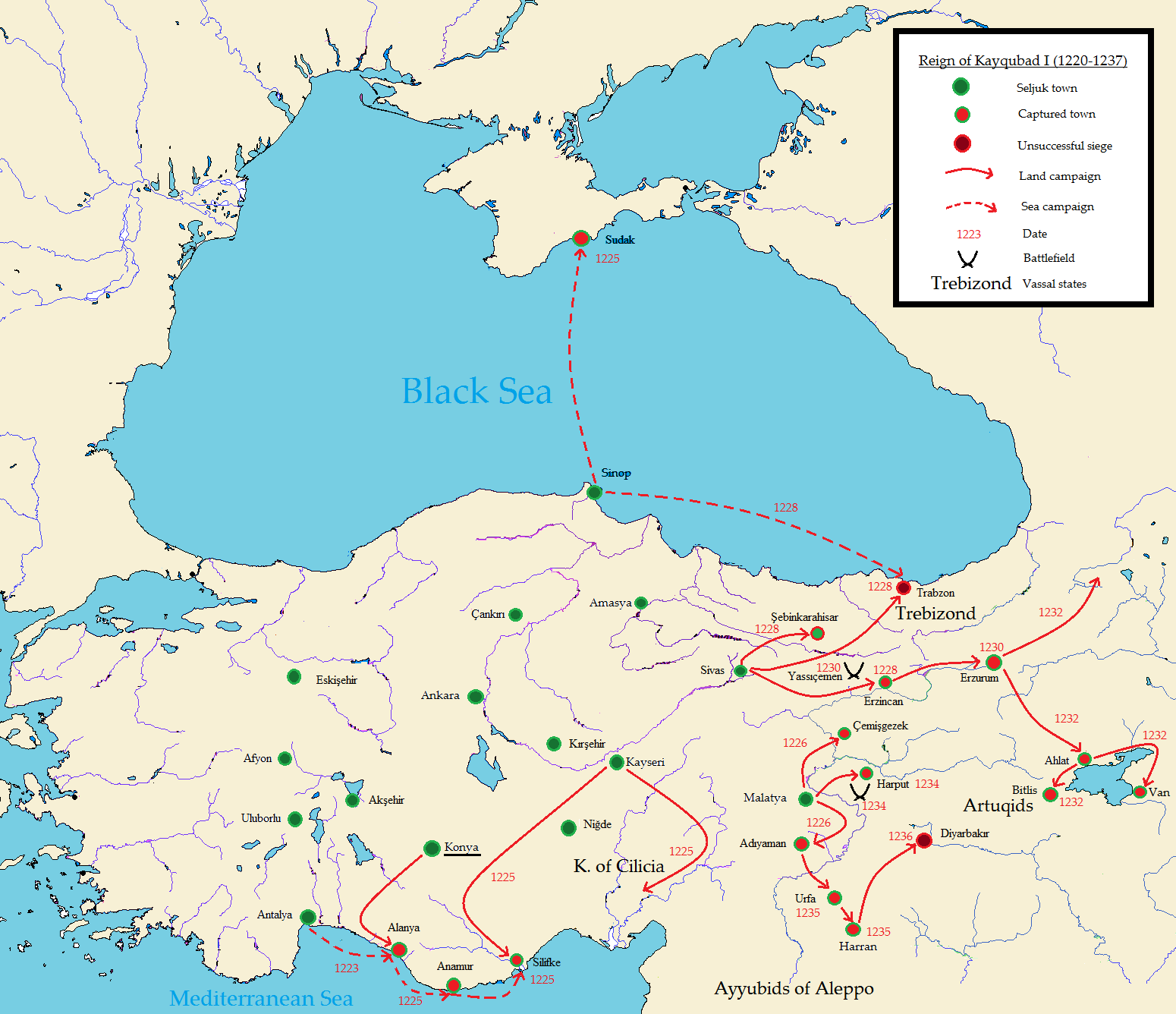
The sultanate expanded considerably during the reign of Kayqubad, mostly in the east.

In the Cilicia Campaign of 1225, Kayqubad reduced the kingdom of Cilician Armenia to a vassal state.

In 1221/1222 Kayqubad launched a naval attack on Sudak which defeated the combined forces of Rus and Cumans. He attacked the Armenian Kingdom of Cilicia in 1221 taking the city of Alanya from its governor, Kir Fard.

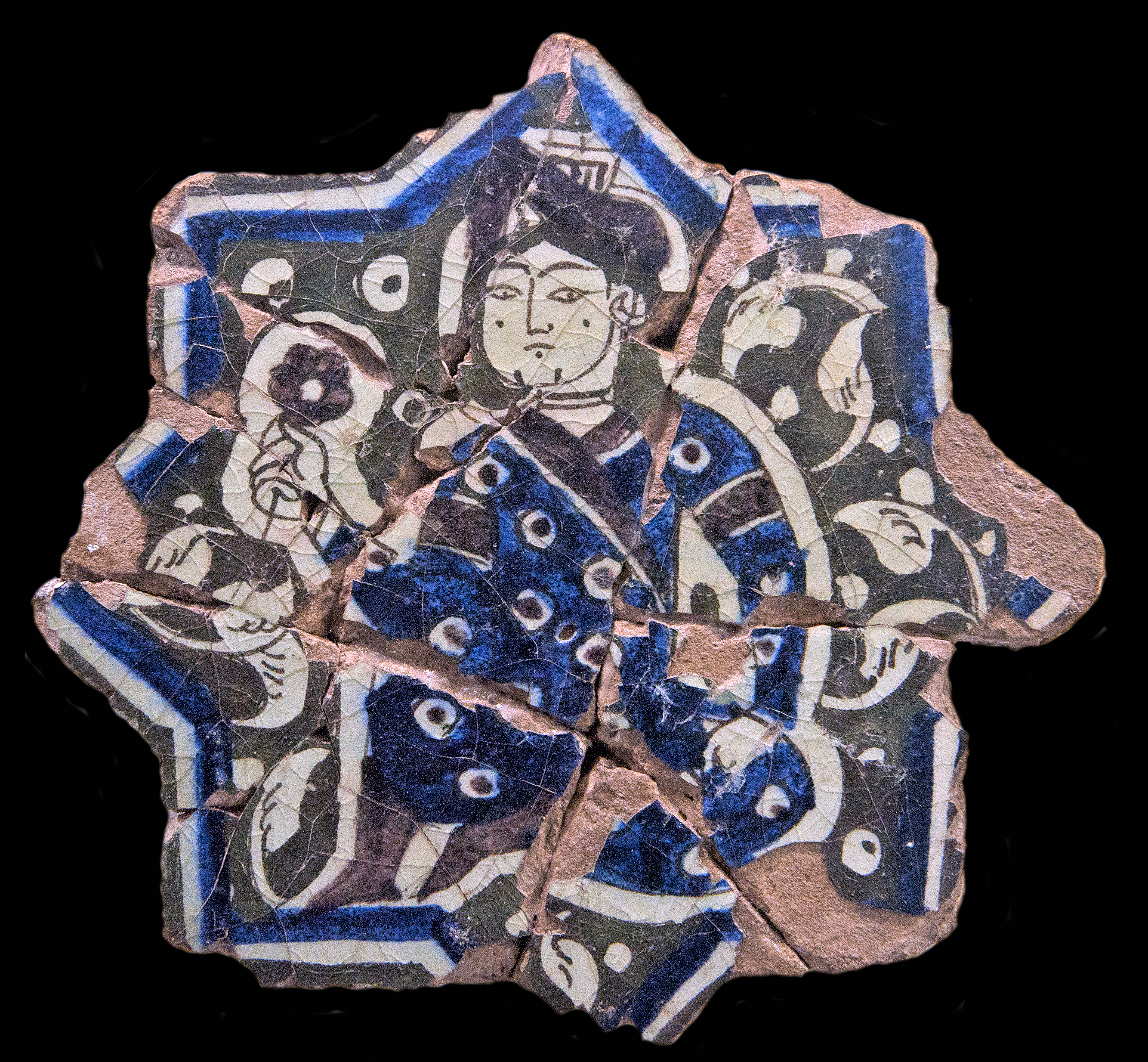
Sultan Kayqubad I (r.1220–1237) or a notable of his court, seated in Turkic style and holding a flower, symbol of eternal life. Kubadabad Palace, late 1220s. (Note: "Kubadabad tiles consist of panels of figural tiles linked by cruciform tiles decorated with arabesques. The figural tiles are decorated with figures of the sultan, harem women, courtiers and servants. However, the most interesting figures are the various animals related to hunting and the imaginary or magical animals. Such creatures as the sphinx, siren, single and double-headed eagles, single and paired peacocks, paired birds flanking the tree of life and dragon create a magical world of the imagination. They are all symbolic representations of the rich figural world of the Seljuks. Animals related to hunting, such as the fox, hare, wolf, mountain goat, wild ass, bear, lion, falcon, hawk and antelope are in widely varying and highly artistic compositions.") (Note: "Usually made in the underglaze technique, the star tiles contain an extremely rich figural design, depicting the sultan, the elite of the palace and animals of the hunt as well as imaginary or so-called 'fabulous' animals. (See figural reliefs and sculptures, p. 171.) The sultan and the palace notables, including in some cases the palace women, are shown sitting cross-legged in the Turkish tradition. In most cases, the figures hold in their hands a symbol representing eternal life-a pomegranate or opium branch or an astrological symbol like the fish. It is interesting to note the parallels with the same motifs in Anatolian Seljuk architecture.")

In 1227/1228, Kayqubad advanced into Anatolia, where the arrival of Jalal al-Din Mangburni, who was fleeing the destruction of his Khwarezmian Empire by the Mongols, had created an unstable political situation. The sultan settled Turcomans along the Taurus Mountains frontier, in a region later called İçel. At the end of the 13th century, these Turcomans established the Karamanids. The Ayyubids, who were disturbed by the rapid expansion of Sultan Kayqubad I, especially in eastern Anatolia, took action against the sultan under the leadership of Al-Kamil in Egypt. In 1234 Kayqubad completely defeated the allied Ayyubid forces. Afterward, Harput expanded its borders further in the south-east Anatolia region by capturing Siverek, Urfa, Harran and Raqqa. The sultan defeated the Artuqids and the Ayyubids and absorbed the Mengujek emirate into the sultanate, capturing the fortresses of Hısn Mansur, Kahta, and Çemişgezek along his march. He also put down a revolt by the Empire of Trebizond and, although he fell short of capturing their capital, forced the Komnenos dynasty family to renew their pledges of vassalage.

At first, Kayqubad sought an alliance with his Turkish kinsman Jalal al-Din Mangburni against the Mongol threat. The alliance could not be achieved, and afterward, Jalal al-Din took the important fortress at Ahlat. Kayqubad finally defeated him at the Battle of Yassıçimen between Sivas and Erzincan in 1230. After his victory, he advanced further east, establishing Seljuq rule over Erzurum, Ahlat and the region of Lake Van (formerly part of Ayyubids). The Artuqids of Diyarbakır and the Ayyubids of Syria recognized his sovereignty. He also captured several fortresses in Georgia, whose queen sued for peace and gave her daughter Tamar in marriage to Kayqubad's son, Kaykhusraw II. Mindful of the increasing presence and power of the Mongols on the borders of the Sultanate of Rum, he strengthened the defenses and fortresses in his eastern provinces.

In 1237, the Ayyubid sultan Al-Kamil sent an envoy to Kayqubad in Kayseri seeking an end to hostilities. The envoy arrived too late, Kayqubad having died 31 May 1237.

== Architecture and culture ==
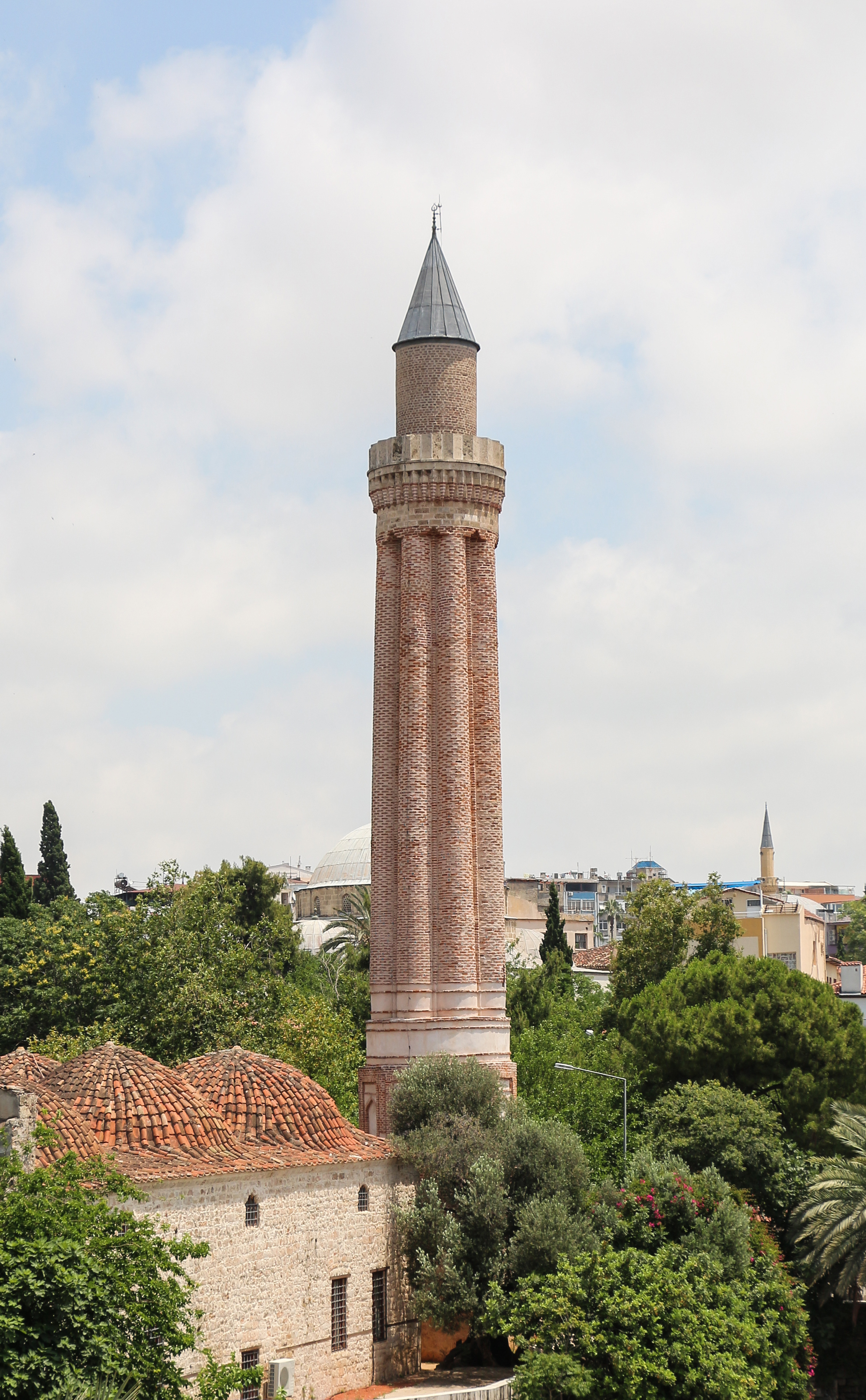
Yivli Minare Mosque, built in Antalya by Kayqubad I

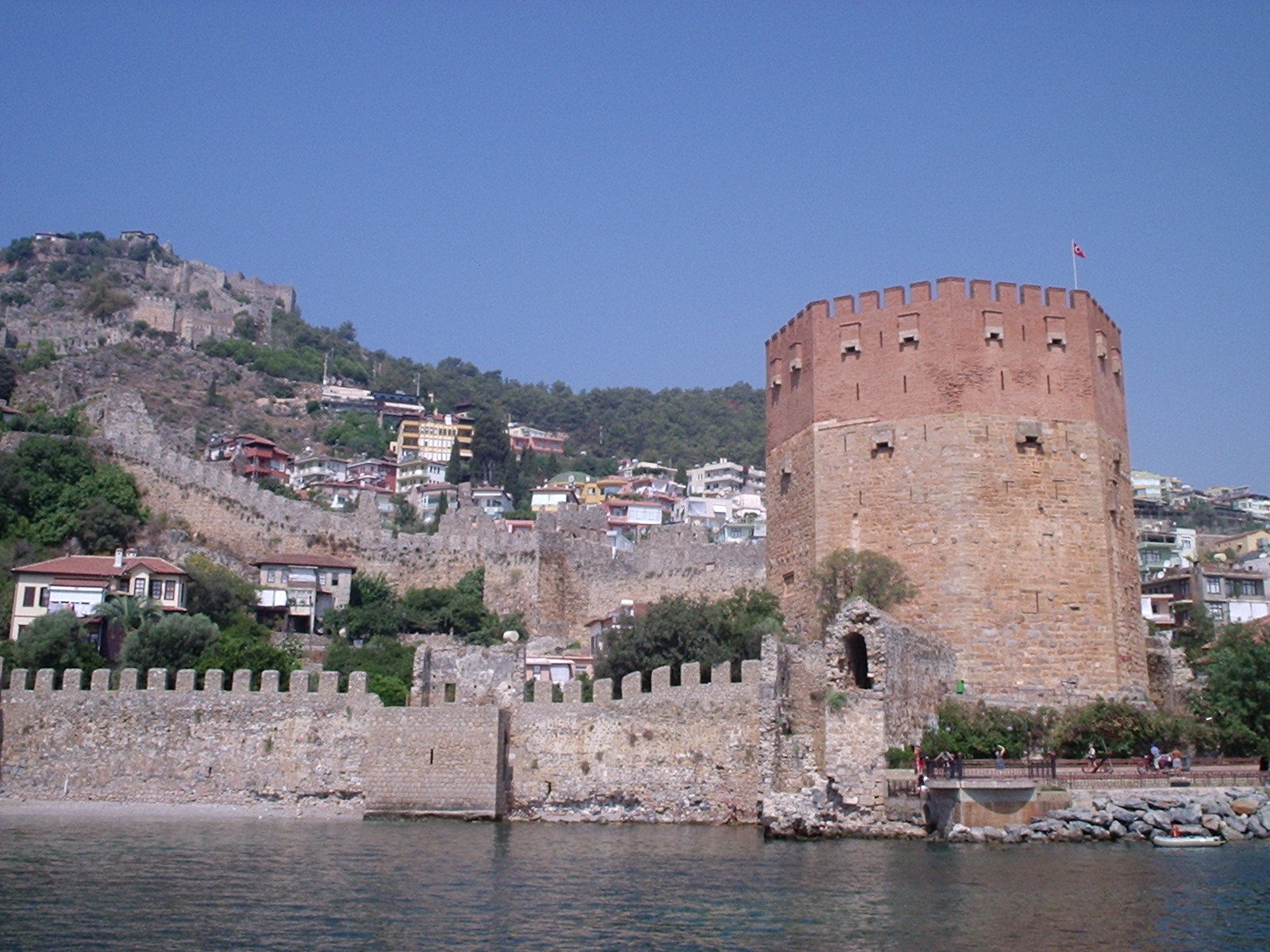
The Kızıl Kule, or Red Tower, built in Alanya by Kayqubad I

Kayqubad sponsored a large-scale building campaign across Anatolia. Apart from reconstructing towns and fortresses, he built many mosques, medreses, caravanserais, bridges and hospitals, many of which are preserved to this day. Besides completing the construction of the Seljuq Palace in Konya, he also built the Kubadabad Palace on the shore of Lake Beyşehir, Alanya Castle and Red Tower in Alanya and Kayqubadiyya Palace near Kayseri.

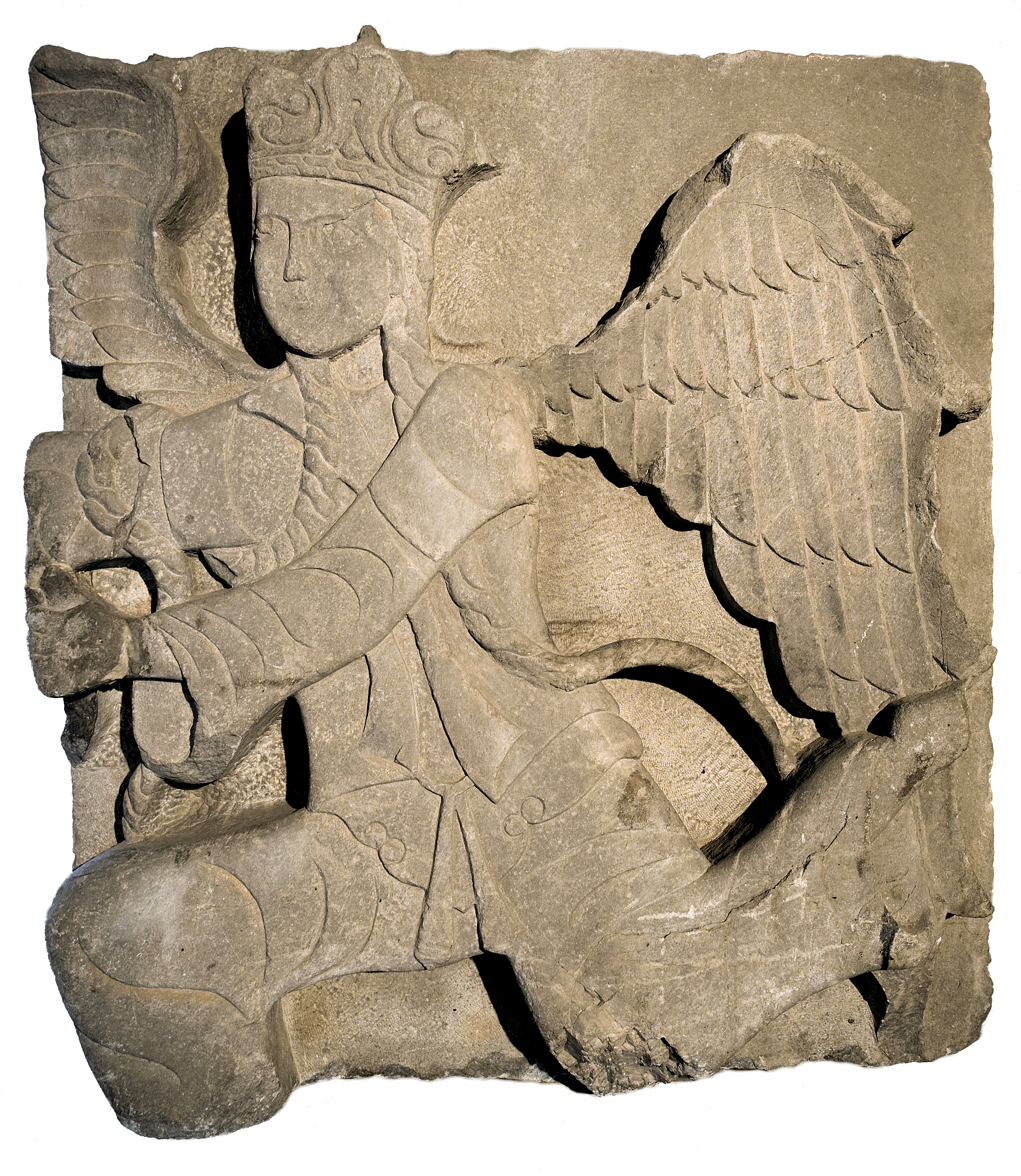
Stone relief from the walls of the Konya citadel, 1221-1222

Kayqubad also built the Konya citadel (the city walls of Konya). The citadel incorporated many western decorative elements, such as a statue of Hercules, a frieze from a Roman sarcophagus, courtly scenes with seated figures in toga, winged deities around the figure of the sun, mixed with inscriptions in Arabic. It would seem that such symbolism mixing Western and Eastern elements was mostly derived from the influence of the Artuqids, who were adept at combining Classical and Perso-Islamic approaches.

Kayqubad, like the other Seljuq sultans of Rum, was quite well-versed in the fine arts and would recite quatrains in Persian during wine-drinking parties.

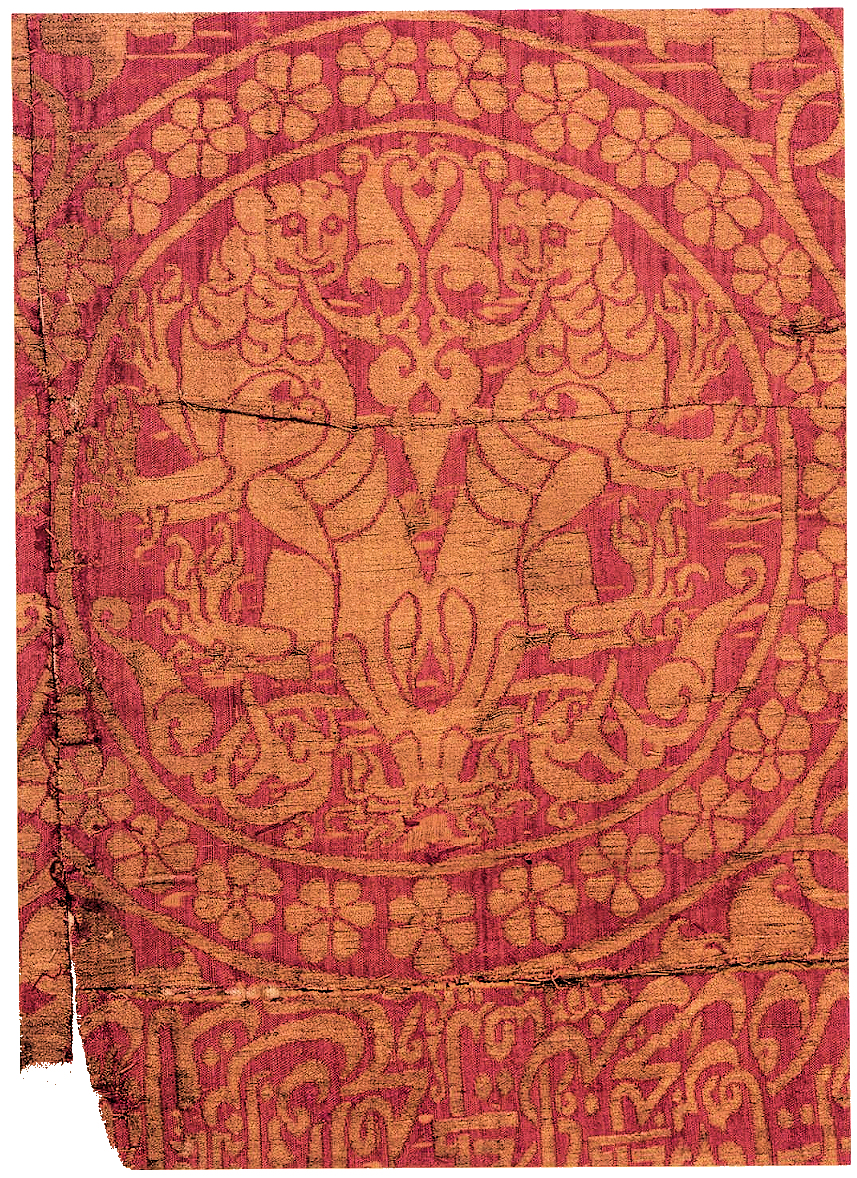
Tapestry in the name of Kayqubad I.

One of the objects securely associated with Kayqubad I is a tapestry fragment, now in the Lyon Textile Museum, decorated with addorsed lions in gold on a red background. The tapestry includes the name and titles of the sultan: “[Highness of the World] and of religion, Father of Conquest, Kayqubad, son of Kaykhusraw, Proof of the Commander [of the Faithful]” ([ʿalā al-dunyā] wa ’l-dīn abū’l-fatḥ Kayqubād bin Kaykhusraw burhān Amir [al-mūʾminīn]). This type of design was widely shared across the medieval Mediterranean, and the image of a lion as a heraldic images probably also appealed to the ruler.

== Death ==
Kayqubad was given poison during a feast at Kayseri and died at an early age on 31 May 1237, the last of his line to die in independence. Poison was indeed found in the DNA analysis performed on his bones.

Historian Ibn Bibi mourned his death with these words,"With Kayqubad's death, the back of Islam was broken and the bond of kingdom and religion snapped".

== Succession ==
Kayqubad had three sons: Kaykhusraw II, eldest son of his Greek wife Mahpari Khatun, Rukn al-Din and Kilij Arslan, sons of his Ayyubid princess wife Malika Adila Khatun. According to Ibn Bibi, Kayqubad wanted Rukn al-Din as his successor who was the elder one of his two sons from his Ayyubid wife, Malika Adila Khatun, but Kaykhusraw usurped the throne and had Rukn al-Din, Kilij Arslan and their mother strangled.

== Identity ==
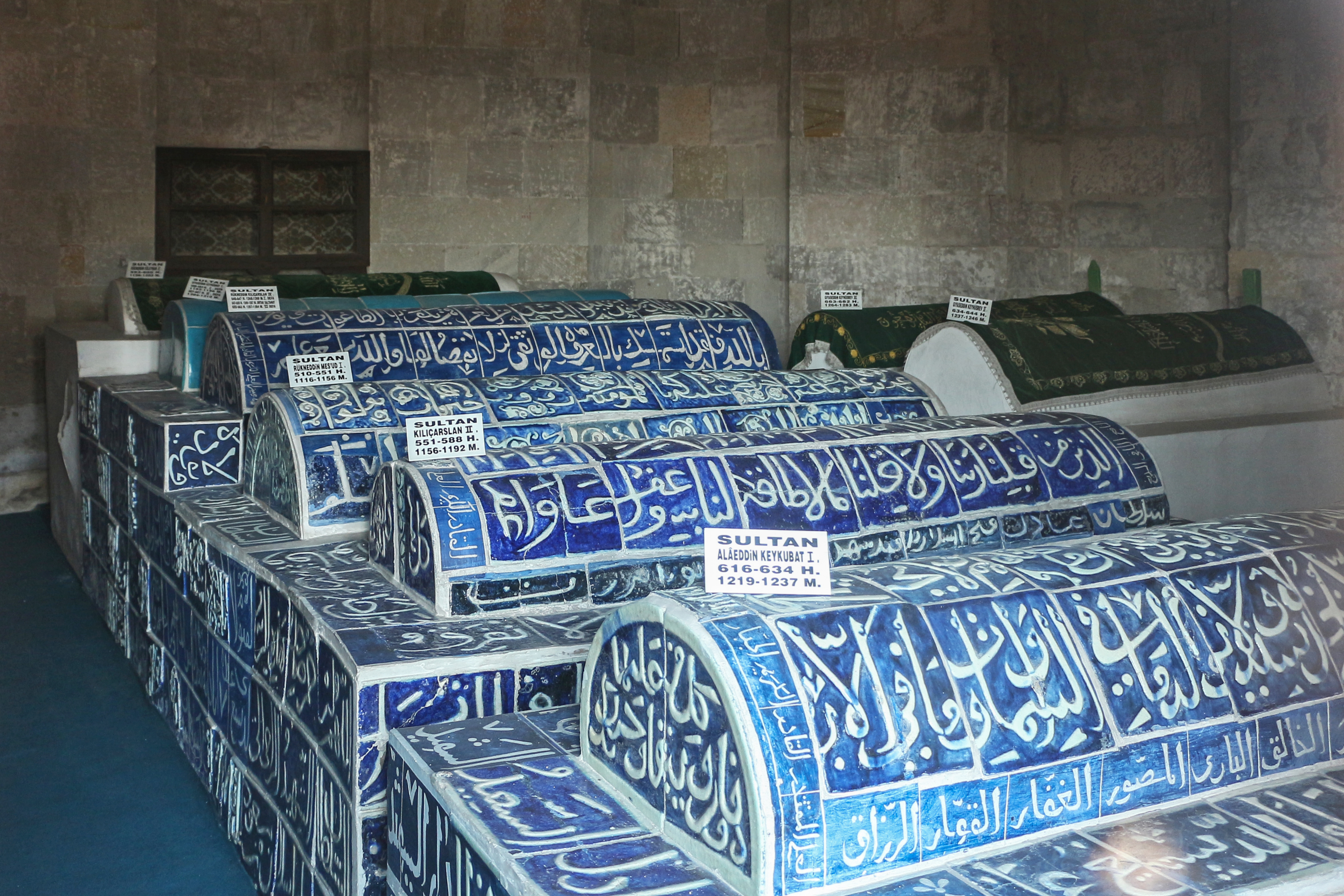
Tomb of Kayqubad I (first from front)

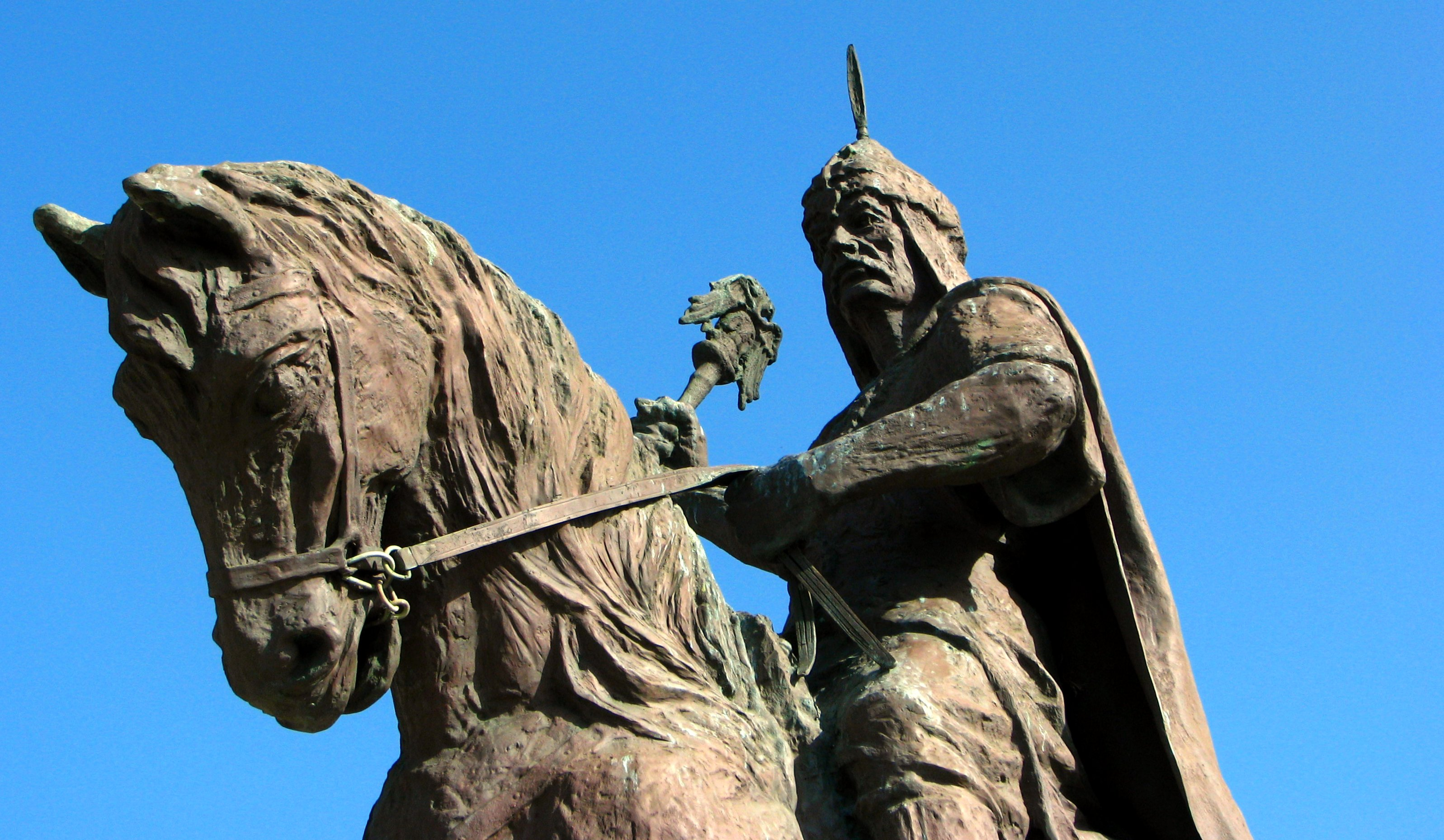
Modern statue of Kaykubad I in Alanya

According to Rustam Shukurov, it is very probably that Kayqubad and his brother Kaykaus I, who both spent considerable time in Byzantium with their father, had the same dual religious (Christian and Muslim) and dual ethnic (Turkic/Persian and Greek) identity as Kaykhusraw I, Kaykaus II, and Mesud II.

== Relations with scholars ==
Kayqubad I had good relations with the Muslim scholars, Sufis and poets. Many Muslim Sufis and poets such as Mūhyūddīn İbnūl-Arābī, Abd al-Laṭīf al-Baghdādī, Ahi Evran, Necmeddīn-i Dāyē, Kāniî-i Tūsī, Shihab al-Din 'Umar al-Suhrawardi and Sultanulūlemā Bâhâeddīn Veled came to Anatolia during his reign.

== Portrayal in media ==
In the Turkish historical television series, Diriliş: Ertuğrul, Kayqubad I is portrayed by Turkish actor Burak Hakkı.

A drama based on his life which is released in late 2026 "ask ve taht" where he is portrayed by Turkish actor Akin Akinozu

== Sources ==
- Anooshahr, Ali (2008). The Ghazi Sultans and the Frontiers of Islam: A comparative study of the late medieval and early modern periods. Routledge. ISBN 978-11-34-04134-3.
- Lambton, Ann K.S.; Lewis, Bernard (1977). The Cambridge History of Islam: The Central Islamic lands since 1918. Vol. 1B. Cambridge University Press. p. 248. ISBN 978-052-129-135-4.
- Cahen, Claude (1968). Pre-Ottoman Turkey: A general survey of the material and spiritual culture and history c. 1071-1330. New York: Taplinger. hdl:2027/heb.00871. ISBN 1-59740-456-X.
- Cahen, Claude (1997). "Kaykubad; Kaykubad I". In Van Donzel, E.; Lewis, B.; Pellat, Ch. (eds.). The Encyclopaedia of Islam. Vol. IV. Brill. pp. 817–818.
- Cahen, Claude (1997a). "Kaykhusraw; Kaykhusraw II". In Van Donzel, E.; Lewis, B.; Pellat, Ch. (eds.). The Encyclopaedia of Islam. Vol. IV. Brill. pp. 816–817.
- Crane, H. (1993). "Notes on Saldjūq Architectural Patronage in Thirteenth Century Anatolia". Journal of the Economic and Social History of the Orient. 36 (1). Leiden: Brill: 1–57. doi:10.1163/156852093X00010. ISSN 0022-4995. JSTOR 3632470.
- Curta, Florin (2005). Borders, Barriers, and Ethnogenesis: Frontiers in Late Antiquity and the Middle Ages. Brepols. ISBN 9782503515298.
- Eastmond, Antony (2017). Tamta's World. Cambridge University Press. p. 197. ISBN 978-11-07-16756-8.
- Koprulu, M. (2006). Early Mystics in Turkish Literature. Translated by Leiser, Gary; Dankoff, Robert. Routledge.
- Leiser, Gary (2010). "The History of the Patriarchs of the Egyptian Church as a Source for the History of the Seljuks of Anatolia". Living Islamic History: Studies in Honour of Professor Carole Hillenbrand: 107–128.
- Öney, Gönül (1980). The Art and architecture of Turkey. Rizzoli. pp. 175–176. ISBN 978-0-8478-0273-9.
- Özel, Mehmet (1986). Traditional Turkish Arts: Tiles and ceramics. General Directorate of Fine Arts, Ministry of Culture and Tourism, Turkish Republic. p. 15.
- Peacock, A. C. S. (2006). "The Saljūq Campaign against the Crimea and the Expansionist Policy of the Early Reign of 'Alā' al-Dīn Kayqubād". Journal of the Royal Asiatic Society. 16 (2). Cambridge: Cambridge University Press: 133–149. doi:10.1017/S1356186306005979. ISSN 1356-1863. S2CID 55636025.
- Peacock, A.C.S.; Yildiz, Sara Nur, eds. (2013). The Seljuks of Anatolia: Court and Society in the Medieval Middle East. I.B.Tauris. ISBN 978-0857733467.
- Redford, Scott (1991). "The Alaeddin Mosque in Konya Reconsidered". Artibus Asiae. 51 (1/2). Zürich: Artibus Asiae Publishers: 54–74. doi:10.2307/3249676. ISSN 0004-3648. JSTOR 3249676.
- Redford, Scott (1993). "Thirteenth-Century Rum Seljuq Palaces and Palace Imagery". Ars Orientalis. 23, Pre-Modern Islamic Palaces.
- Savvides, A.G.C. [in Greek] (1981). Byzantium in the Near East: Its Relations with the Seljuk Sultanate of Rum in Asia Minor, the Armenians of Cilicia and the Mongols, A.D. C. 1192-1237, Volume 16. Kentron Vyzantinōn Ereunōn - Original from University of Michigan. p. 190.
- Wolff, R.L.; Hazard, H. W., eds. (1969). The Later Crusades, 1189-1311 — XX: The Aiyubids. University of Wisconsin Press. pp. 693–714.
- Sümer, Farok (2002). KEYKUBAD I (in Turkish). Ankara: Published in 25th Volume of TDV İslâm Ansiklopedisi. pp. 358–359.
- Özcan, Koray (2010). "The Anatolian Seljuk City An Analysis on Early Turkish Urban Models in Anatolia". Central Asiatic Journal. 54 (2). Harrassowitz Verlag: 273–290.
- Spinei, Victor (2009). The Romanians and the Turkic Nomads North of the Danube Delta from the Tenth to the Mid-Thirteenth Century. BRILL. ISBN 9789047428800.

Preceded by Kaykaus I	Sultan of Rûm; 1220–1237	Succeeded by Kaykhusraw II
