= Seljuk Empire =

Turco-Persianate empire (1037–1194)

- 1037–1194
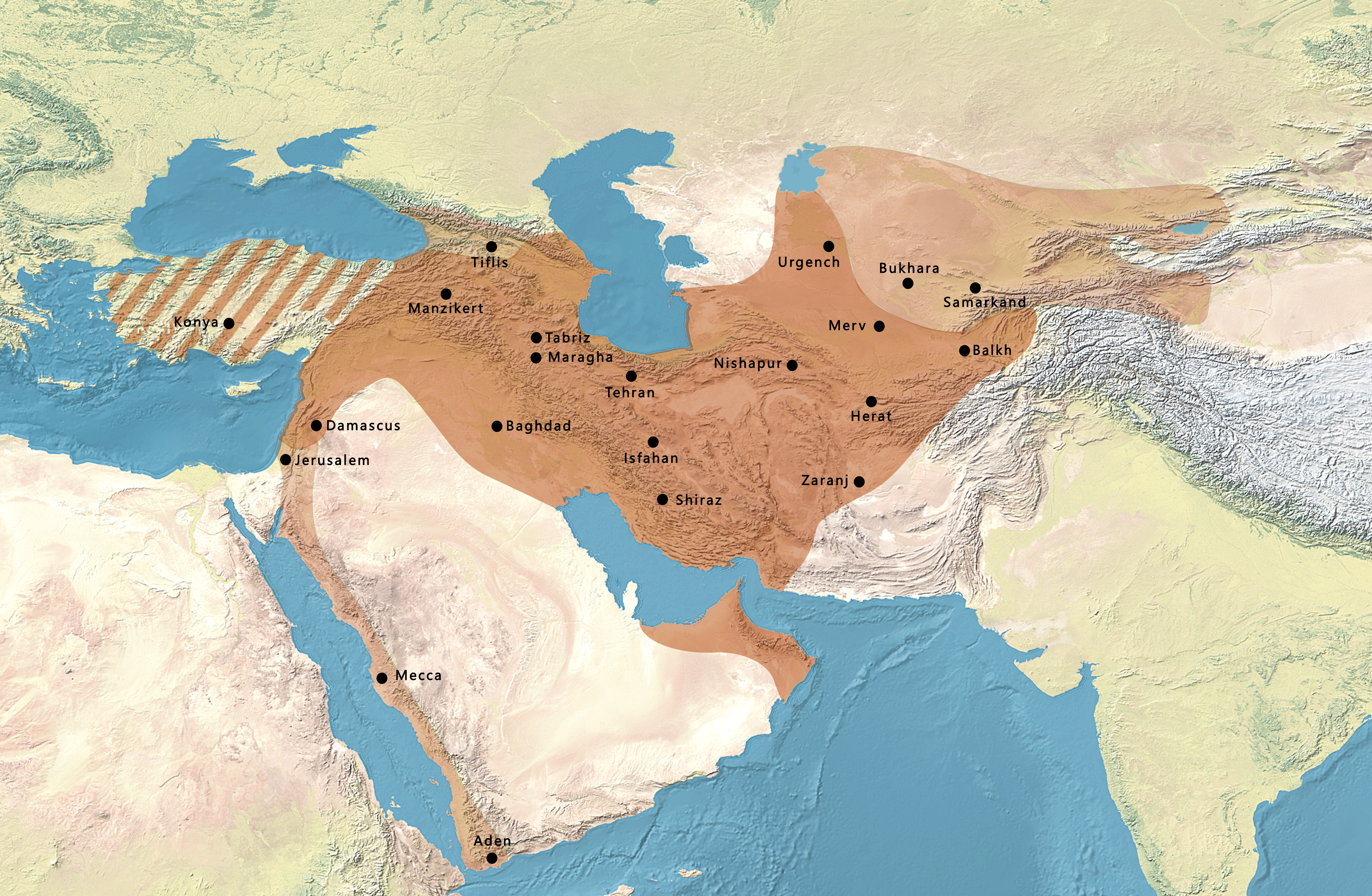
- Seljuk Empire c. 1090, during the reign of Malik-Shah I
- Status: Vassal under caliphate (de jure); Independent sultanate (de facto)
- Capital: Nishapur (1037–1043); Ray (1043–1051); Isfahan (1051–1118); Merv (1118–1153, eastern); Hamadan (1118–1194, western)
- Common languages: Persian (official; lingua franca, court, erudition, and literature); Oghuz Turkic (dynastic and military); Arabic (theology, law, and science)
- Religion: Sunni Islam (Hanafi)
- Government: Hereditary monarchy
- Caliph
  - 1031–1075: Al-Qa'im
  - 1180–1225: Al-Nasir
- Sultan
  - 1037–1063: Tughril (first)
  - 1174–1194: Tughril III (last)
- History
  - Formation under Tughril: 1037
  - Battle of Dandanaqan: 1040
  - Battle of Manzikert: 1071
  - First Crusade: 1095–1099
  - Battle of Qatwan: 1141
  - Battle of Ray and the supplantation by the Khwarazmian Empire: 1194

Area
- 1080 est.: 3,900,000 km^{2} (1,500,000 sq mi)
Preceded by
Oghuz Yabgu State
Ghaznavids
Buyid dynasty
Byzantine Empire
Kakuyids
Fatimid Caliphate
Kara-Khanid Khanate
Marwanids
Rawadids
Uqaylids
Succeeded by
Sultanate of Rûm
Anatolian beyliks
Ghurid dynasty
Khwarazmian Empire
Atabegs of Azerbaijan
Salghurids
Bavandids
Zengid dynasty
Burid dynasty
Ayyubid dynasty
Danishmends
Artuqid dynasty
Shah-Armens
Shaddadids
Kerman Seljuk Sultanate
Nabhani dynasty

The Seljuk Empire (/ˈsɛldʒuːk/ SEL-jook in BrE, /sɛlˈdʒuk/ sel-JOOK in AmE), or the Great Seljuk Empire, (Note: In order to distinguish it from the Anatolian branch of the Seljuk dynasty, the Sultanate of Rum.) was a high medieval, culturally Turco-Persian empire established and ruled by the Qïnïq branch of Oghuz Turks. The empire spanned a total area of 3.9 million square kilometres (1.5 million square miles) from Anatolia and the Levant in the west to the Hindu Kush in the east, and from Central Asia in the north to the Persian Gulf in the south, and covered the time period 1037–1308, though Seljuk rule beyond the Anatolian peninsula ended in 1194.

The Seljuk Empire was founded in 1037 by Tughril (990–1063) and his brother Chaghri (989–1060), both of whom co-ruled over its territories; there are indications that the Seljuk leadership otherwise functioned as a triumvirate and thus included Musa Yabghu, the uncle of the aforementioned two.

During the formative phase of the empire, the Seljuks first advanced from their original homelands near the Aral Sea into Khorasan and then into the Iranian mainland, where they would become largely based in a Persianate society. They then moved west to conquer Baghdad, filling the power vacuum created by struggles between the Arab Abbasid Caliphate and the Iranian Buyid Empire.

The subsequent Seljuk expansion into eastern Anatolia triggered the Byzantine–Seljuk wars, with the Battle of Manzikert in 1071 marking a decisive turning point in the conflict in favour of the Seljuks, undermining the authority of the Byzantine Empire in the remaining parts of Anatolia and gradually enabling the Turkification of the region.

The Seljuk Empire united the fractured political landscape in the non-Arab eastern parts of the Muslim world and played a key role in both the First and Second crusades; it also bore witness to the creation and expansion of multiple artistic movements during this period. In 1141, the Seljuk Empire suffered a devastating defeat at the Battle of Qatwan against the Western Liao dynasty, resulting in the loss of vast eastern territories. This defeat greatly weakened the empire, causing internal division and hastening its decline. The Seljuks were eventually supplanted in the east by the Khwarazmian Empire in 1194 and in the west by the Zengids and Ayyubids. The last surviving Seljuk sultanate to fall was the Sultanate of Rum, in 1308.

== History ==
=== Founder of the dynasty ===
The founder of the dynasty was Seljuk, a warlord, who belonged to the Qïnïq tribe of Oghuz Turks. He led his clan to the banks of the Syr Darya river, near city of Jend, where they converted to Islam in 985. Khwarezm, administered by the Ma'munids, was under the nominal control of the Samanid Empire. By 999, the Samanids had fallen to the Kara-Khanid Khanate in Transoxiana, while the Ghaznavids occupied the lands south of the Amu Darya. The Seljuks supported the last Samanid emir against the Kara-Khanids before establishing an independent base.

=== Expansion of the empire ===
==== Tughril and Chaghri ====
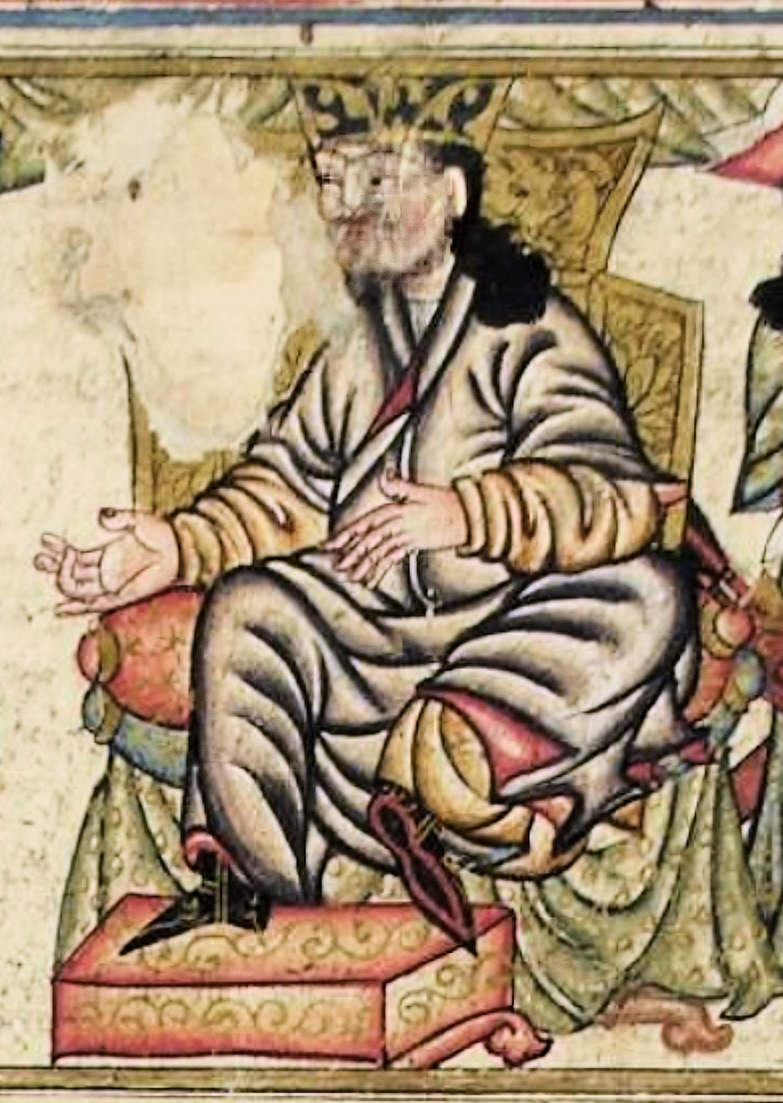
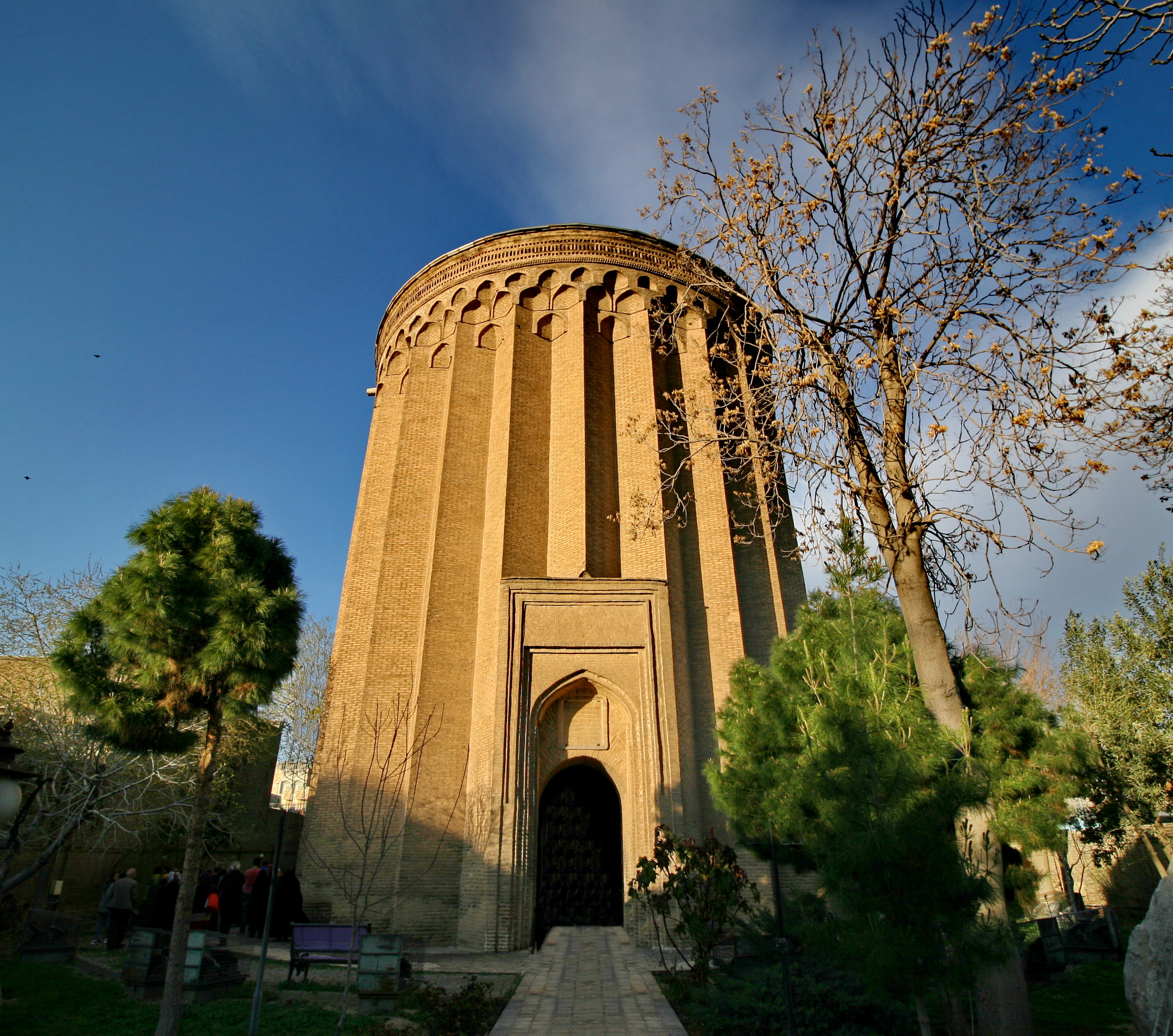
Seljuk Sultan Tughril enthroned, in Jami al-Tawarikh, 1314. Toghrol Tower, tomb of Tughril, in the city of Rey, modern Iran.

The Oghuz Turks (also known as Turkmens at the time) were one of several groups of the Oghuz who made their way to Iran between about 1020 and 1040. They were led by Seljuk's son, Musa, and Musa's two nephews, Tughril and Chaghri. They first moved south to Transoxiana, and then to Khorasan, initially at the invitation of local rulers, then enmeshed in alliances and conflicts. Contemporary sources place them in Dehistan/Mishrian, Gyzylarbat, and Nisa, as well as Sarakhs, all in present-day Turkmenistan.

Around 1034, Tughril and Chaghri were soundly defeated by the Oghuz Yabghu Ali Tegin and his allies, forcing them to escape from Transoxiana. Initially, the Seljuks took refuge in Khwarazm, which served as one of their traditional pastures, but they were also encouraged by the local Ghaznavid governor, Harun, who hoped to utilise the Seljuks for his efforts to seize Khorasan from his sovereign. When Harun was assassinated by Ghaznavid agents in 1035, they again had to flee, this time heading south across the Karakum Desert. First, they made their way to the important city of Merv, but perhaps due to its strong fortifications, they turned westwards to take refuge in Nisa. Finally, the Seljuks arrived on the edges of Khorasan, the province considered a jewel in the Ghaznavid crown.

After moving into Khorasan, the Seljuks under Tughril wrested an empire from the Ghaznavids. Initially, the Seljuks were repulsed by Mahmud of Ghazni and retired to Khwarazm, but Tughril and Chaghri led them to capture Merv and Nishapur (1037–1038). Later, they repeatedly raided and traded territory with Mahmud's successor, Mas'ud, across Khorasan and Balkh.

In 1040, at the Battle of Dandanaqan, the Seljuks decisively defeated Masʽud I, forcing him to abandon most of his western territories. Afterwards, the Seljuks employed Khorasanians and set up a Persian bureaucracy to administer their new polity with Tughril as its nominal overlord. By 1046, al-Qa'im had sent Tughril a diploma recognising Seljuk rule over Khorasan. In 1048–1049, the Seljuks, commanded by Ibrahim Yinal, uterine brother of Tughril, made their first incursion into the Byzantine frontier region of Iberia and clashed with a combined Byzantine-Georgian army of 50,000 at the Battle of Kapetron on 10 September 1048. The Byzantine magnate Eustathios Boilas described the devastation of the area in 1051–1052 as "foul and unmanageable... inhabited by snakes, scorpions, and wild beasts". The Arab chronicler Ibn al-Athir wrote that Ibrahim brought back 100,000 captives and 10,000 camel loads of loot.

In 1055, Tughril entered Baghdad and removed the influence of the Buyid dynasty, under a commission from the Abbasid caliph. During the occupation of Baghdad, the library built by Sabur ibn Ardashir was burned. Iraq remained under Seljuk control until 1135.

==== Alp Arslan ====
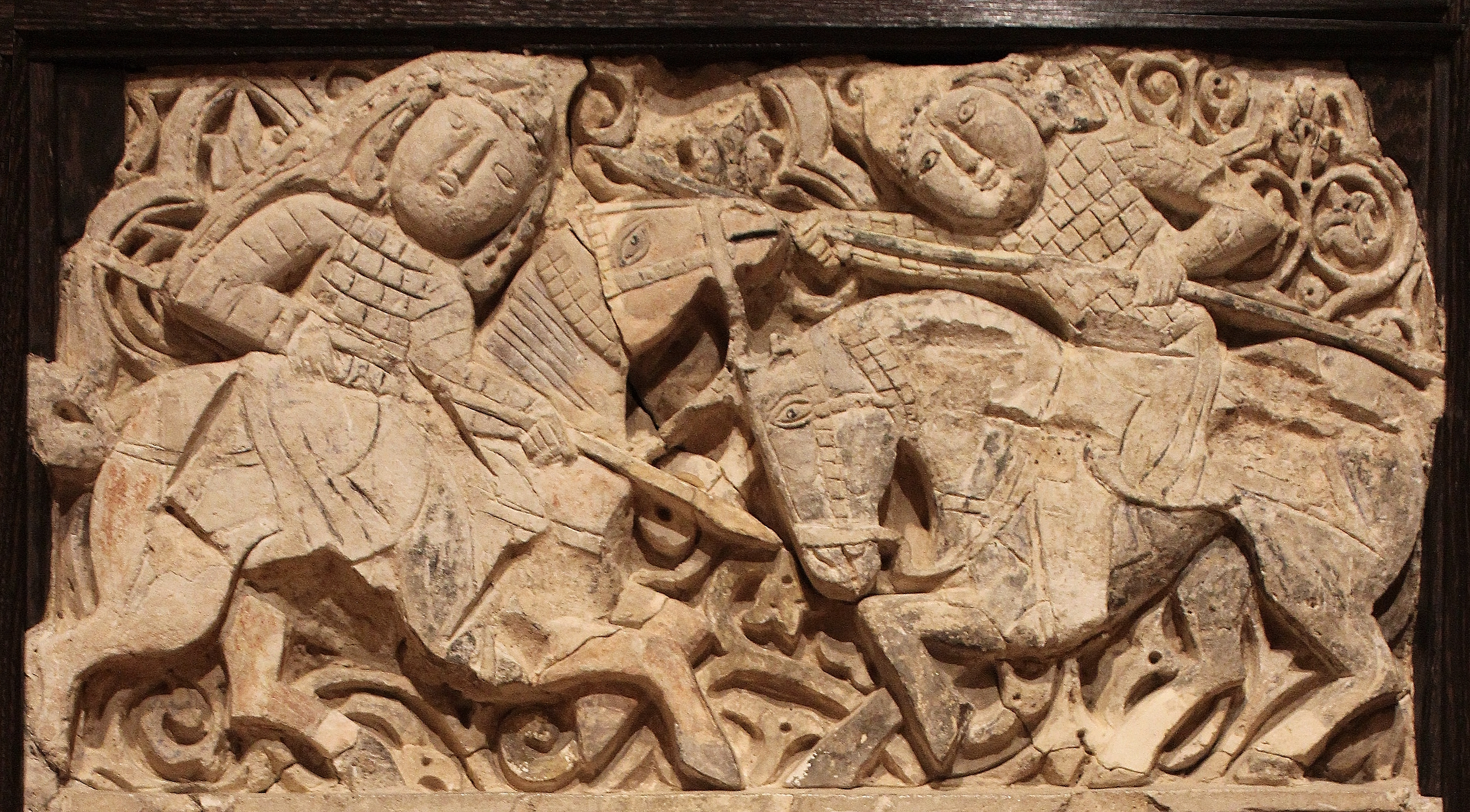
Combat theme, Seljuk or post-Seljuk period. Possibly from Rayy. Iran, 12th-13th century. Seattle Art Museum.

Alp Arslan, the son of Chaghri Beg, expanded significantly upon Tughril's holdings by adding Armenia and Georgia in 1064 and invading the Byzantine Empire in 1068, from which he annexed almost all of Anatolia. Arslan's decisive victory at the Battle of Manzikert in 1071 effectively neutralized the Byzantine resistance to the Turkish invasion of Anatolia, although the Georgians were able to recover from Alp Arslan's invasion by securing the theme of Iberia. The Byzantine withdrawal from Anatolia brought Georgia into more direct contact with the Seljuks. In 1073 the Seljuk amirs of Ganja, Dvin and Dmanisi invaded Georgia and were defeated by George II of Georgia, who successfully took the fortress of Kars. A retaliatory strike by the Seljuk Amir Ahmad defeated the Georgians at Kvelistsikhe.

Alp Arslan authorized his Turkoman generals to carve their own principalities out of formerly Byzantine Anatolia, as atabegs loyal to him. Within two years the Turkmens had established control as far as the Aegean Sea under numerous beyliks: the Saltukids in Northeastern Anatolia, the Shah-Armens and the Mengujekids in Eastern Anatolia, Artuqids in Southeastern Anatolia, Danishmendis in Central Anatolia, Rum Seljuks (Beylik of Suleyman, which later moved to Central Anatolia) in Western Anatolia, and the Beylik of Tzachas of Smyrna in İzmir (Smyrna).

==== Malik Shah I ====
Under Alp Arslan's successor, Malik-Shah I, and his powerful Persian vizier, Nizam al-Mulk, the Seljuk state expanded in various directions, to the former Iranian border of the days before the Arab invasion, so that it soon bordered China in the east and the Byzantines in the west. Malik Shah's brother Tutush defended Seljuk's interests in Syria in the battle of Ain Salm against Suleiman ibn Qutalmish who had started to carve out an independent state in Anatolia. Nevertheless, despite various attempts to bring the various Turkish warlords in Anatolia under control, they largely maintained their independence. Malik-Shah I was the one who moved the capital from Ray to Isfahan. The iqta military system and the Nizamiyya of Baghdad were established by Nizam al-Mulk, and the reign of Malik-Shah I was reckoned the golden age of "Great Seljuk". The Abbasid caliph titled him "The Sultan of the East and West" in 1087.

Internally, the most prominent development of Malik Shah's rule was the continuous increase in the power of the Nizam al-Mulk. Some contemporary chroniclers refer to the period as al-dawla al-Nizamiyya, the Nizam's state, while modern scholars have mentioned him as "the real ruler of the Seljuq empire". The 14th century biographer Taj al-Din al-Subki claimed that Nizam al-Mulk's vizierate was "not just a vizierate, it was above the sultanate". The Order of Assassins (Hashshashin) of Hasan-i Sabbah started to become a force during his era, however, and they assassinated many leading figures in his administration; according to many sources, these victims included Nizam al-Mulk.

==== Ahmad Sanjar ====
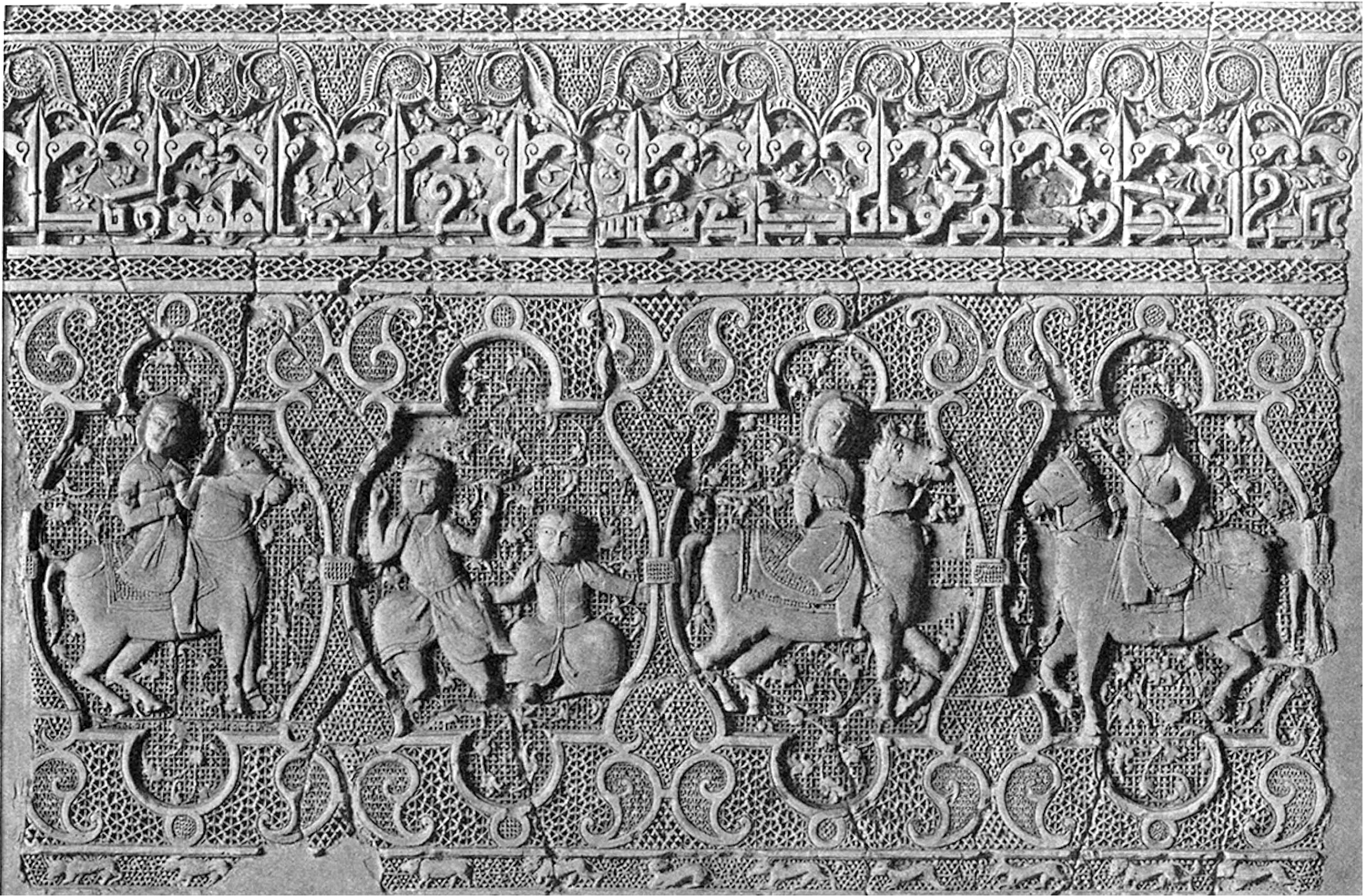
Monumental Seljuk stucco panel (116 x 178cm), Saveh, Iran, 12th century.

Ahmad Sanjar was the son of Malik Shah I and initially took part in wars of succession against his three brothers and a nephew: Mahmud I, Berkyaruq, Malik Shah II and Muhammad I Tapar. In 1096, he was tasked to govern the province of Khorasan by his brother Muhammad I. Over the next several years, Ahmad Sanjar became the ruler of most of Iran (Persia), and eventually in 1118, the sole ruler of the Great Seljuk Empire, but with a subordinate Sultan in Iraq in the person of Mahmud II.

In 1141, Ahmad marched to eliminate the threat posed by Kara-Khitans and faced them in the vicinity of Samarkand at the Battle of Qatwan. He suffered his first defeat in his long career, and as a result lost all Seljuk territory east of the Syr Darya.

Sanjar's as well as the Seljuks' rule collapsed as a consequence of yet another unexpected defeat, this time at the hands of the Seljuks' own tribe, in 1153. Sanjar was captured during the battle and held in captivity until 1156. It brought chaos to the Empire – a situation later exploited by the victorious Turkmens, whose hordes would overrun Khorasan unopposed, wreaking colossal damage on the province and prestige of Sanjar. Sanjar eventually escaped from captivity in the fall of 1156, but soon died in Merv in 1157. After his death, Turkic rulers, Turkmen tribal forces, and other secondary powers competed for Khorasan. In 1181, Sultan Shah, a pretendent to the Khwarezmian throne, managed to take control of Khorasan, until 1192 when he was defeated near Merv by the Ghurids, who captured his territories. The Ghurids then took control of all Khorasan following the death of his successor Tekish in 1200, as far as Bastam in the ancient region of Qūmes. The province was finally conquered by Khwarazmians after the Ghurid defeat at the Battle of Andkhud (1204).

The Tomb of Ahmad Sanjar was destroyed by the Mongols led by Tolui, who sacked the city of Merv in 1221, killing 700,000 people according to contemporary sources during their catastrophic invasion of Khwarazm; however, modern scholarship holds such figures to be exaggerated.

=== Division of empire ===
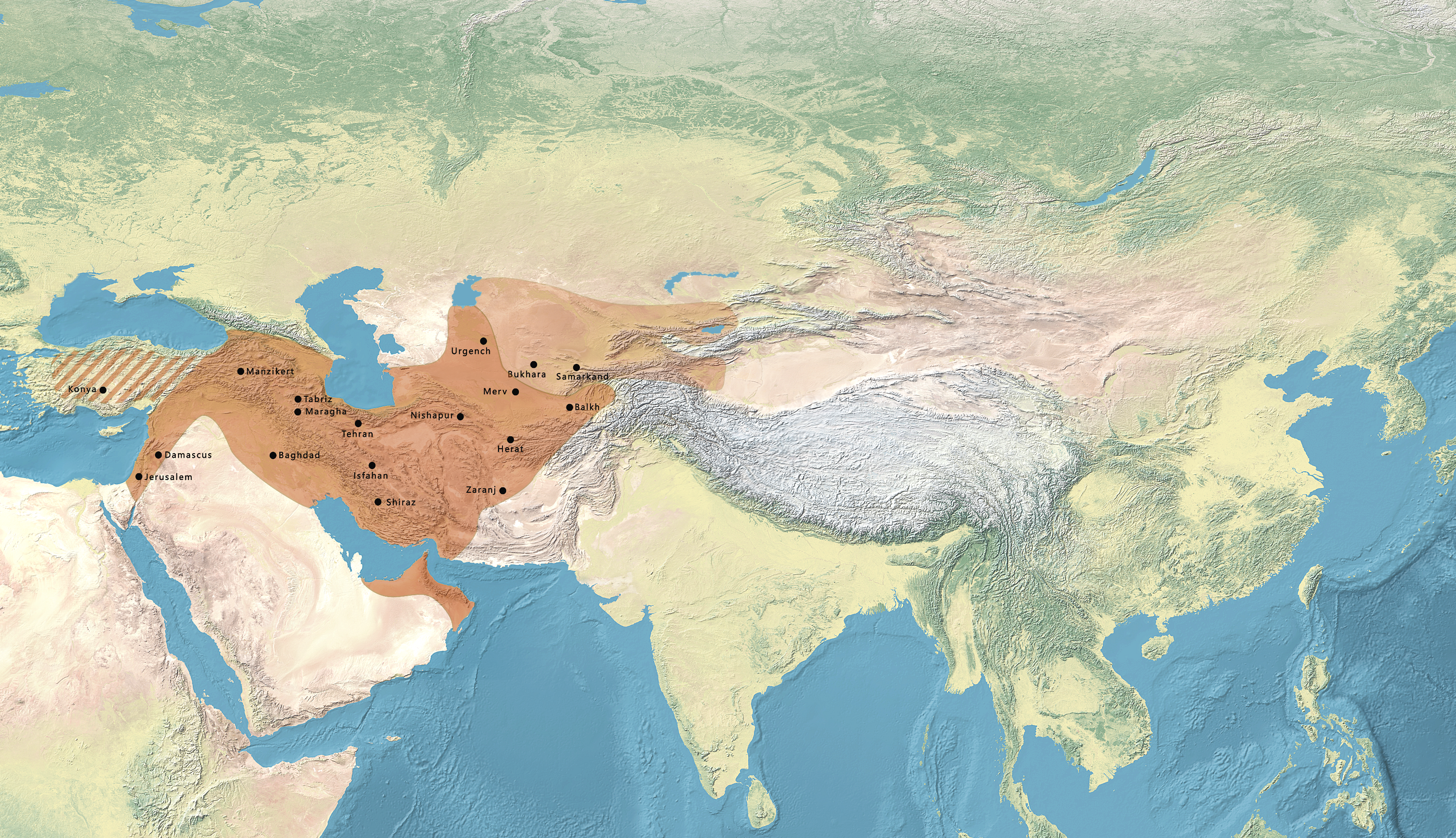
The Seljuk Empire and the Sultanate of Rum, with contemporary Asian polities circa 1100.

When Malik-Shah I died in 1092, the empire split as his brother and four sons quarrelled over the apportioning of the empire among themselves. At the same time, the son of Suleiman ibn Qutalmish, Kilij Arslan I, escaped Malik-Shah I's imprisonment and claimed authority in the former lands of his father. In Persia, Malik-Shah I's four-year-old son Mahmud I was proclaimed sultan but his reign was contested by his three brothers Berkyaruq in Iraq, Muhammad I in Baghdad, and Ahmad Sanjar in Khorasan. Additionally, Malik-Shah I's brother Tutush I made a claim to the throne but was killed in battle against Berkyaruq in February 1096. Upon his death, his sons Radwan and Duqaq inherited Aleppo and Damascus respectively and contested with each other as well, further dividing Syria amongst emirs antagonistic towards each other.

In 1118, the third son Ahmad Sanjar took over the empire. His nephew, the son of Muhammad I, did not recognize his claim to the throne, and Mahmud II proclaimed himself Sultan and established a capital in Baghdad, until 1131 when he was finally officially deposed by Ahmad Sanjar.

Elsewhere in nominal Seljuk territory were the Artuqids in northeastern Syria and northern Mesopotamia; they controlled Jerusalem until 1098. The Dānišmand dynasty founded a state in eastern Anatolia and northern Syria and contested land with the Sultanate of Rum, and Kerbogha exercised independence as the atabeg of Mosul.

=== First Crusade (1095–1099) ===
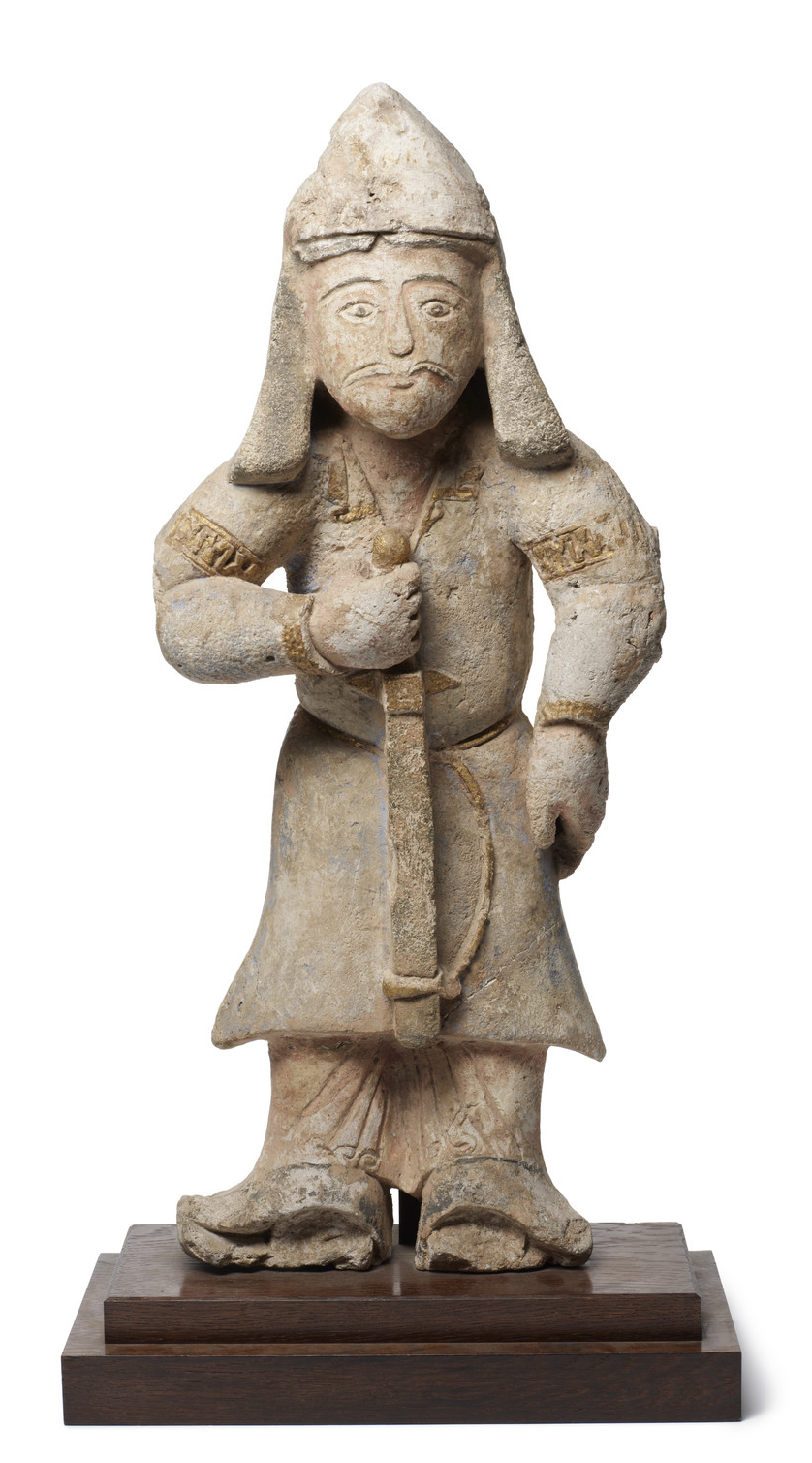
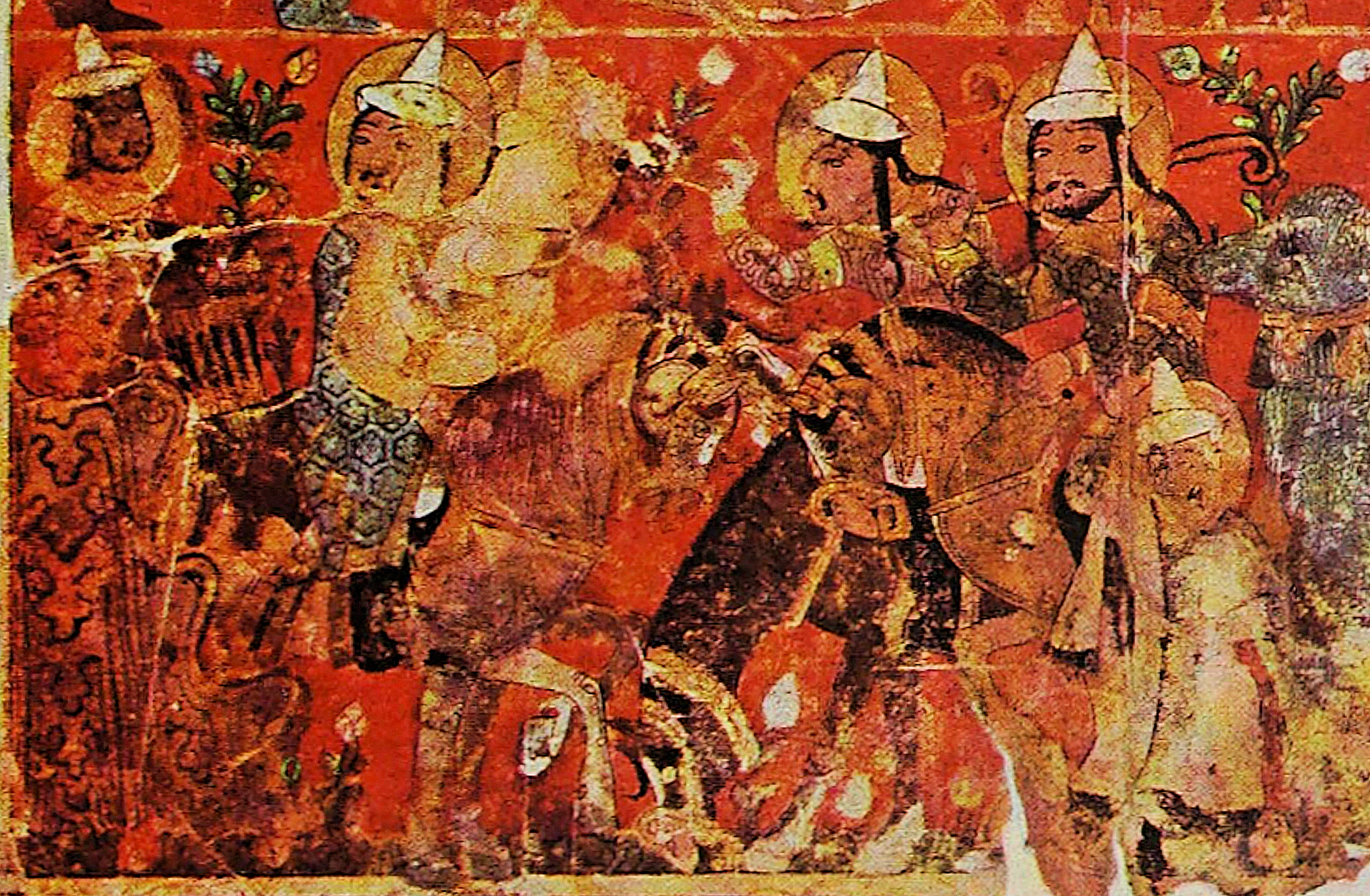
Seljuk warrior figurine (12th century), and Turkoman soldiers from the Book of Antidotes of Pseudo-Gallen. Probably northern Iraq (Mosul). Mid 13th century.

During the First Crusade, the fractured states of the Seljuks were generally more concerned with consolidating their own territories and gaining control of their neighbours than with cooperating against the crusaders. The Seljuks easily defeated the People's Crusade arriving in 1096, but they could not stop the progress of the army of the subsequent Princes' Crusade (First Crusade), which took important cities such as Nicaea (İznik), Iconium (Konya), Caesarea Mazaca (Kayseri), and Antioch (Antakya) on its march to Jerusalem (al-Quds). In 1099, the crusaders finally captured the Holy Land and set up the first Crusader states. The Seljuks had already lost Jerusalem to the Fatimids, who had recaptured it in 1098 just before its capture by the crusaders.

After pillaging the County of Edessa, Seljuk commander Ilghazi made peace with the Crusaders. In 1121 he went north towards Georgia and with supposedly up to 250,000–350,000 troops, including men led by his son-in-law Sadaqah and Sultan Malik of Ganja, he invaded the Kingdom of Georgia. David IV of Georgia gathered 40,000 Georgian warriors, including 5,000 monaspa guards, 15,000 Kipchaks, 300 Alans and 100 French Crusaders to fight against Ilghazi's vast army. At the Battle of Didgori on 12 August 1121, the Seljuks were routed, being run down by pursuing Georgian cavalry for several days afterward. The battle helped the Crusader states, which had been under pressure from Ilghazi's armies. The weakening of the main enemy of the Latin principalities also benefitted the Kingdom of Jerusalem under King Baldwin II.

=== Second Crusade (1147–1149) ===
During this time conflict with the Crusader states was also intermittent, and after the First Crusade increasingly independent atabegs would frequently ally with the Crusader states against other atabegs as they vied with each other for territory. At Mosul, Imad al-Din Zengi succeeded Kerbogha as atabeg and successfully began the process of consolidating the atabegs of Syria. In 1144 Zengi captured Edessa, as the County of Edessa had allied itself with the Artuqids against him. This event triggered the launch of the Second Crusade. Nur al-Din, one of Zengi's sons who succeeded him as atabeg of Aleppo, created an alliance in the region to oppose the Second Crusade, which landed in 1147.

=== Decline of the Seljuk Empire ===
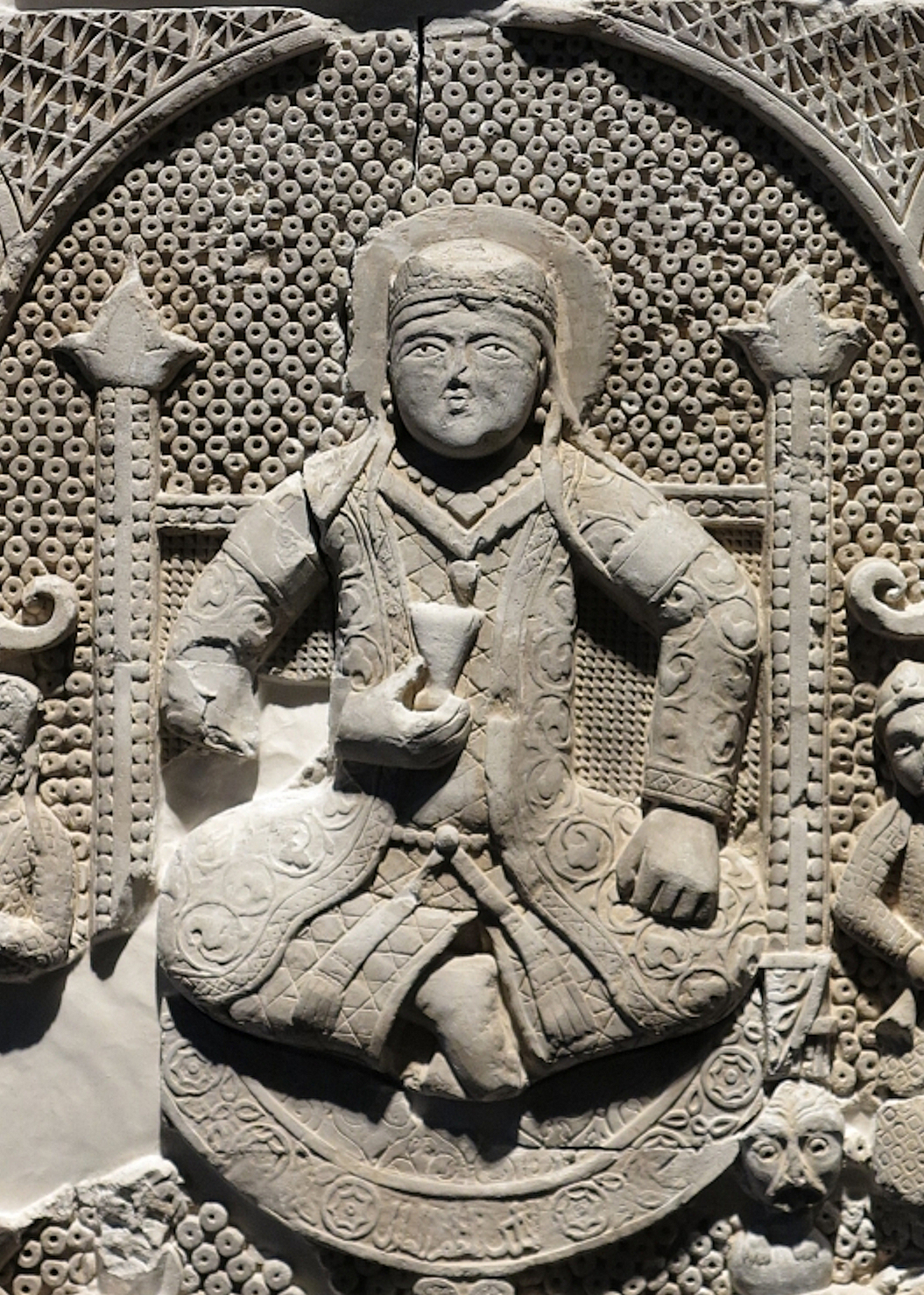
Enthroned figure usually identified as the last Seljuk ruler Tughril III (1176–1194), from Rayy, Iran. Philadelphia Museum of Art.

Ahmad Sanjar fought to contain the revolts by the Kara-Khanids in Transoxiana, Ghurids in Afghanistan and Qarluks in modern Kyrgyzstan, as well as the nomadic invasion of the Qara-Khitais in the east. The advancing Qara-Khitais first defeated the Eastern Kara-Khanids, then followed up by crushing the Western Kara-Khanids, who were vassals of the Seljuks at Khujand. The Kara-Khanids turned to their Seljuk overlords for assistance, to which Sanjar responded by personally leading an army against the Qara-Khitai. However, Sanjar's army was decisively defeated by the host of Yelu Dashi at the Battle of Qatwan on 9 September 1141. While Sanjar managed to escape with his life, many of his close kin, including his wife, were taken captive in the battle's aftermath. As a result of Sanjar's failure to deal with the encroaching threat from the east, the Seljuk Empire lost all its eastern provinces up to the Syr Darya, and vassalage of the Western Kara-Khanids was usurped by the Qara-Khitai, otherwise known as the Western Liao in Chinese historiography.

=== Conquest by Khwarezm and the Ayyubids ===
In 1153, the Oghuz Turks rebelled and captured Sanjar. He managed to escape after three years but died a year later. The Atabegs, such as the Zengids and Artuqids, were only nominally under the Seljuk Sultan, and generally controlled Syria independently. When Sanjar died in 1157, the empire fractured even further and rendered the Atabegs effectively independent.

The breakaway states and dynasties included:

- Kerman Seljuk Sultanate;
- Sultanate of Rum (or Anatolian Seljuks). Capital: Iznik (Nicaea), later Konya (Iconium).

After the Second Crusade, Nur ad-Din's general Shirkuh, who had established himself in Egypt on Fatimid land, was succeeded by Saladin. In time, Saladin rebelled against Nur al-Din Zengi; upon his death, Saladin married his widow, captured most of Syria and created the Ayyubid dynasty.

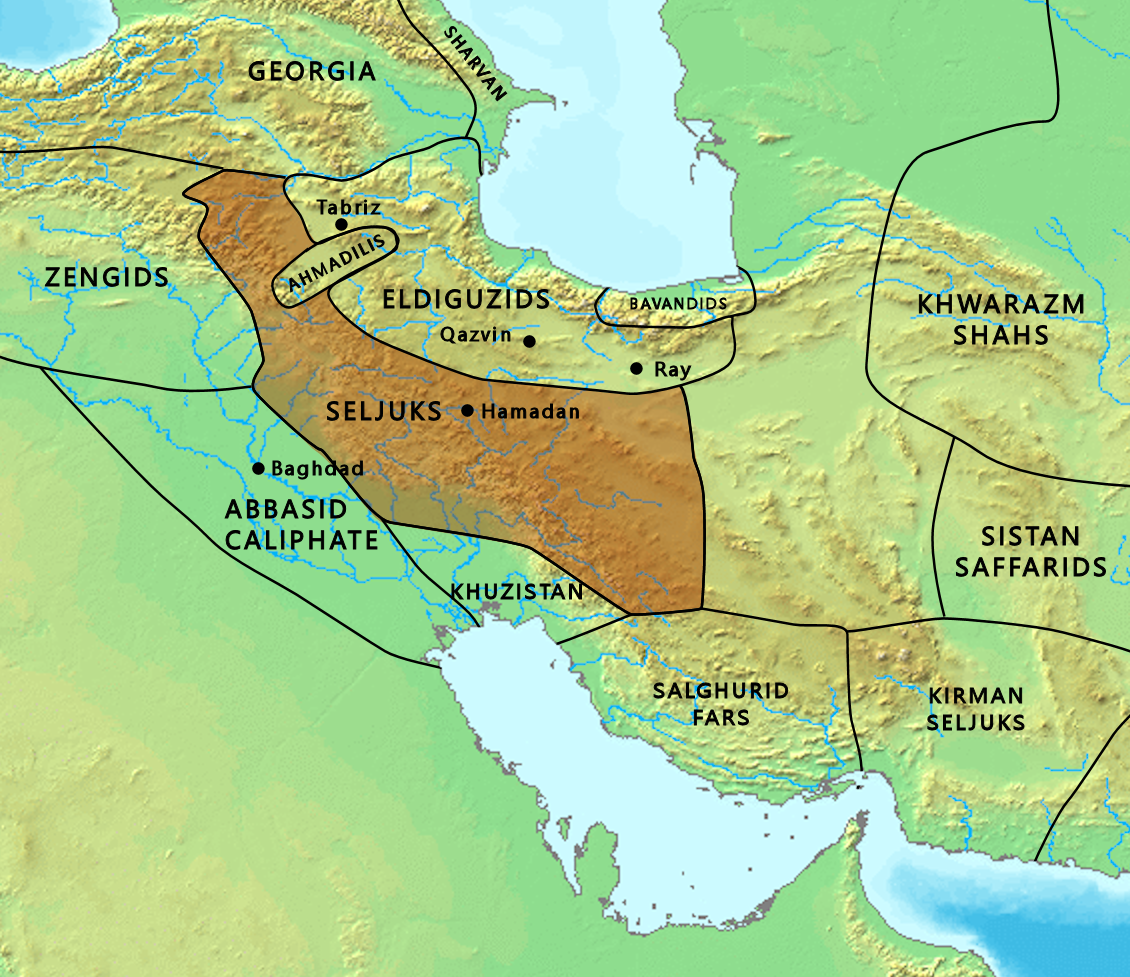
Map of the territory directly held by the Seljuks in 1180 CE.

On other fronts, the Kingdom of Georgia began to become a regional power and extended its borders at the expense of the Great Seljuk Empire. The same was true during the revival of the Armenian Kingdom of Cilicia, under Leo II of Armenia, in Anatolia. The Abbasid caliph al-Nasir also began to reassert the authority of the caliph and allied himself with the Khwarezmshah Ala al-Din Tekish.

For a brief period, Toghrul III was the Sultan of all Seljuk lands except for Anatolia. He spent his reign conquering cities, destroying the citadel of Ray in the process, but was unable to hold any cities long enough to rebuild them. Toghrul III, however, was defeated by Ala al-Din Tekish, Shah of Khwarazmian Empire, and the Seljuk Empire finally collapsed in 1194. Of the former Empire, only the Sultanate of Rum in Anatolia remained.

The Khwarazmian Empire took over as the dominant power in the region, but the Mongol invasion in 1219–1220 soon destroyed it.

The Sultanate of Rum, the last remnants of the Seljuks in Anatolia, ended too with the Mongol invasions of Anatolia through the 1260s, and was divided into small emirates called "beyliks". One of these, the Ottomans, eventually rose to power and conquered the rest.

== Governance ==
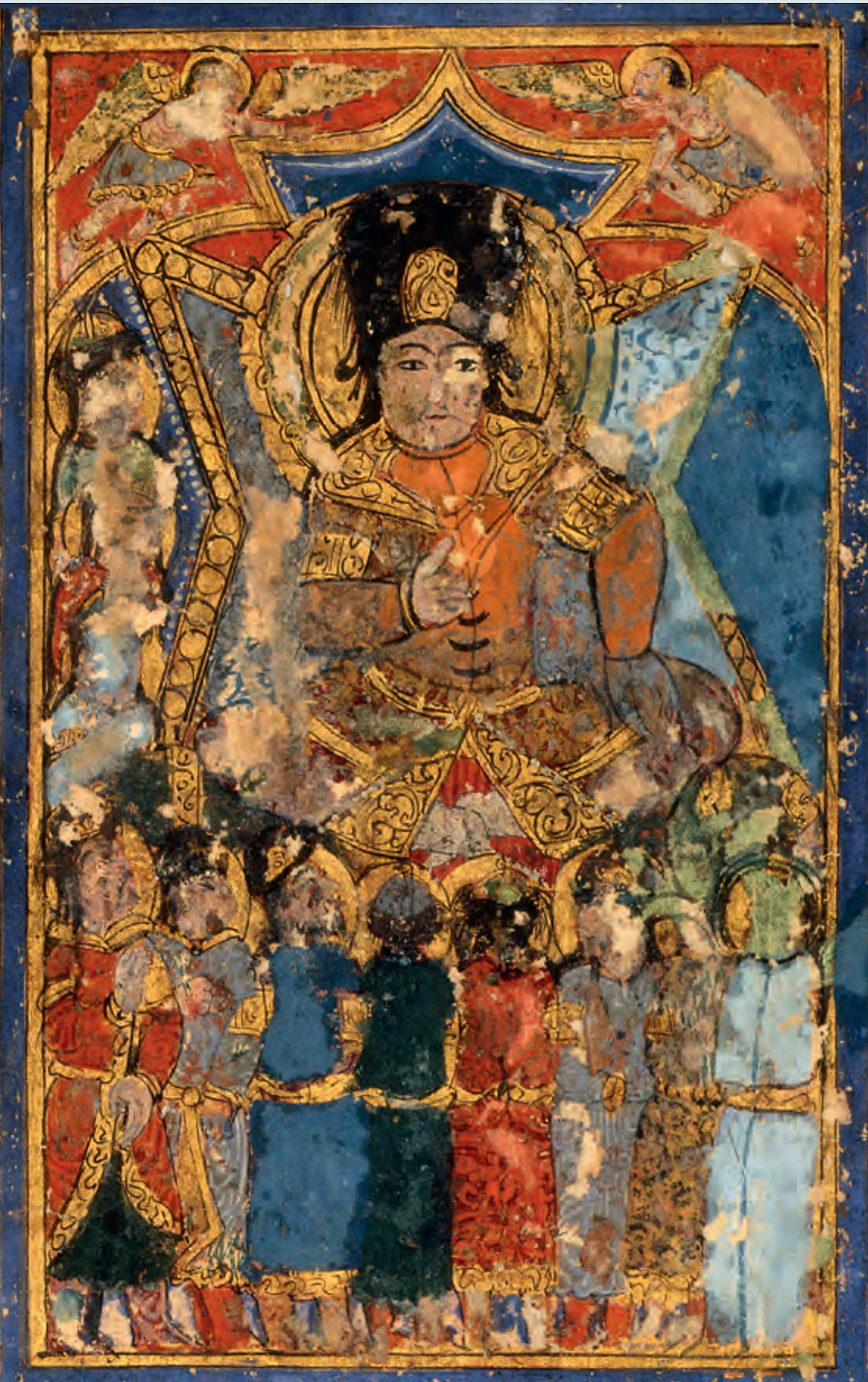
Amir in Turkic military dress: long braids, sharbush fur hat, boots, close-fitting coat. Maqamat by Seljuk poet and dignitary Al-Hariri of Basra, 1237 copy.

Seljuk power was indeed at its zenith under Malikshāh I, and both the Qarakhanids and Ghaznavids had to acknowledge the overlordship of the Seljuks. Seljuk dominion was established over the ancient Sasanian domains, in Iran and Iraq, and included Anatolia, Syria, as well as parts of Central Asia and modern Afghanistan. Their rule was modelled after the tribal organization common among Turkic and Mongol nomadic cultures, resembling a "family federation" or "appanage state". Under this organization, the leading member of the paramount family assigned to family members portions of his domains as autonomous appanages.

== Capital cities ==
The Seljuks exercised full control over Islamic Central Asia and the Middle East between 1040 and 1157. For most of its history, the empire was split into a western and eastern half and did not have a single capital or political center. In the east, the chief seat of Seljuk rule was Marv in present-day Turkmenistan. In the west, various cities, where the Seljuk rulers lived periodically, served as capitals: Rayy, Isfahan, Baghdad, and, later, Hamadan. These western lands were known as the Sultanate of Iraq. (Note: Here, Iraq is meant in its medieval sense, which incorporated western Iran (historic 'Iraq al-'Ajam or Persian Iraq, also known as Jibal) as well as 'Iraq al-Arab (Arab Iraq), roughly the central and southern parts of present-day Iraq) Following the death of Muhammad I Tapar in 1118, Isfahan ceased being an imperial residence. After 1118, the Seljuk rulers of Iraq recognized the suzerainty of the Seljuk sultan Ahmad Sanjar, who mostly ruled from Marv, and was known by the title of al-sultān al-a'zam, 'the Greatest Sultan'. The Seljuk rulers of Iraq were often mentioned as the "Lesser Seljuks".

== Culture and language ==
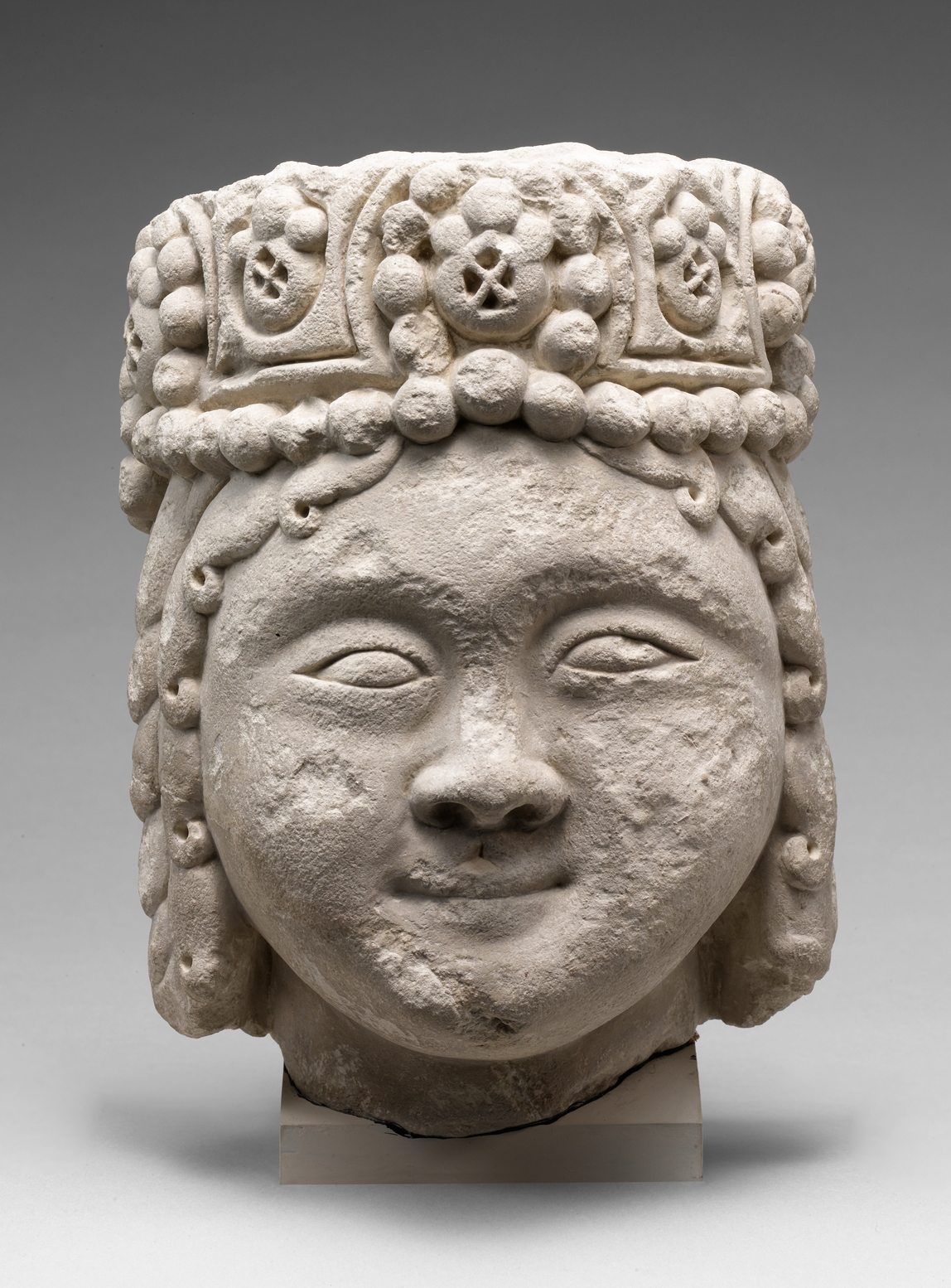
Head with a beaded headdress, 12th – early 13th century, Seljuk period Iran.

Much of the ideological character of the Seljuk Empire was derived from the earlier Samanid and Ghaznavid kingdoms, which had in turn emerged from the Perso-Islamic imperial system of the Abbasid caliphate. This Perso-Islamic tradition was based on pre-Islamic Iranian ideas of kingship molded into an Islamic framework. Little of the public symbolism used by the Seljuks was Turkic, namely the tughra. The populace of the Seljuk Empire would have considered this Perso-Islamic tradition more significant than that of steppe customs.

Highly Persianized in culture and language, the Seljuks also played an important role in the development of the Turco-Persian tradition, even exporting Persian culture to Anatolia. (Note: "...renewed the Seljuk attempt to found a great Turko-Persian empire in eastern Iran ...", "It is to be noted that the Seljuks, those Turkomans who became sultans of Persia, did not Turkify Persia – no doubt because they did not wish to do so. On the contrary, it was they who voluntarily became Persians and who, in the manner of the great old Sassanid kings, strove to protect the Iranian populations from the plundering of Ghuzz bands and save Iranian culture from the Turkoman menace.") Under the Seljuks, Persian was also used for books lecturing about politics in the mirrors for princes genre, such as the prominent Siyasatnama (Book of Politics) composed by Nizam al-Mulk. During this period, these types of books consciously made use of Islamic and Iranian traditions, such as an ideal government based on the Islamic prophet Muhammad and his successors, or the Sasanian King of Kings Khosrow I (r. 531–579).

In most of their coins, the Seljuk sultans used the Sasanian title of shahanshah (King of Kings), and even used the old Buyid title of "Shahanshah of Islam." The title of malik was used by lesser princes of the Seljuk family. Like the caliphate, the Seljuks relied on a refined Persian bureaucracy. The settlement of Turkic tribes in the northwestern peripheral parts of the empire, for the strategic military purpose of fending off invasions from neighboring states, led to the progressive Turkicization of those areas. According to the 12th-century poet Nizami Aruzi, all of the Seljuk sultans had a liking for poetry, which is also demonstrated by the large compilation of Persian verses written under their patronage. This had already started under Tughril, who was praised in Arabic and Persian by poets such as Fakhruddin As'ad Gurgani and Bakharzi, albeit he could not understand the verses. The last Seljuk sultan Tughril III was well known for his Persian poetry. The Saljuq-nama of Zahir al-Din Nishapuri, which was most likely dedicated to Tughril III, indicates that the Seljuk family now used Persian to communicate, and even were taught about the achievements of their forefathers in that language.

Tughril relied on his vizier to translate from Arabic and Persian into Turkic for him, and Oghuz songs were sung at the wedding of Tughril to the caliph's daughter. Later sultans, like Mahmud, could speak Arabic alongside Persian; however, they still used Turkic among themselves. The most significant evidence of the importance of Turkic language is the extensive Turkic–Arabic dictionary, or the Dīwān Lughāt al-Turk, assembled in Baghdad for caliph al-Muqtadi by Mahmud al-Kashgari. However, besides the Diwan, no works written in Turkic language survive from the Seljuk Empire. While the Maliknama was compiled from Turkic oral accounts, it was written in Persian and Arabic.

Steppe traditions influenced Seljuk marriages, with Tughril marrying his brother Chaghri's widow, a practice despised in Islam. Seljuk ceremonies were based on the Abbasid model, but sometimes ancient Iranian ceremonies were observed. During a night in 1091, all of Baghdad was lit with candles under the orders of Malik-Shah I, which resembled the Zoroastrian ritual of sadhak.

== Religion ==
In 985, the Seljuks migrated to the city of Jend, where they converted to Islam. The arrival of the Seljuk Turks into Persia, and their patronage of constructing madrasas, allowed for Sunni Islam to become the dominant sect of Islam. Until the death of Sultan Sanjar, the Seljuks were pious Sunnis and represented a re-establishment of Sunni Islam in Iraq and western Persia since the 10th century.

In 1046, Tughril built the madrasa al-Sultaniya in Nishapur, while Chaghri Beg founded a madrasa in Merv. Tughril and Alp Arslan chose Hanafi qadis and preachers for these madrasas. By 1063, there were twenty-five madrasas scattered throughout Persia and Khorasan, founded by Seljuk princes. In the 12th century there were over thirty madrasas in Baghdad.

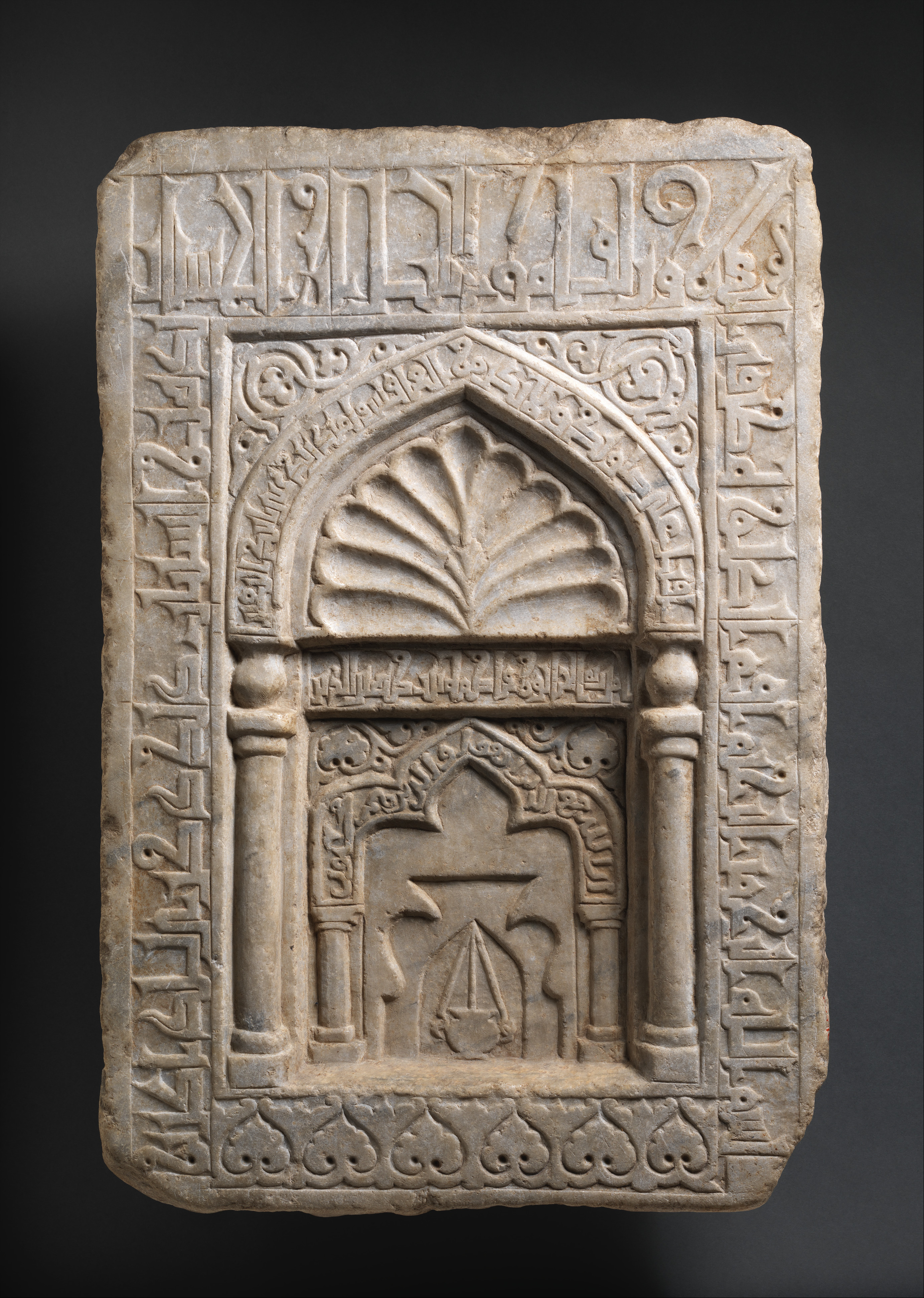
Panel of al-Khatun (the lady) Fatima bint Zahir al-Din, 11th–12th century, Iran.

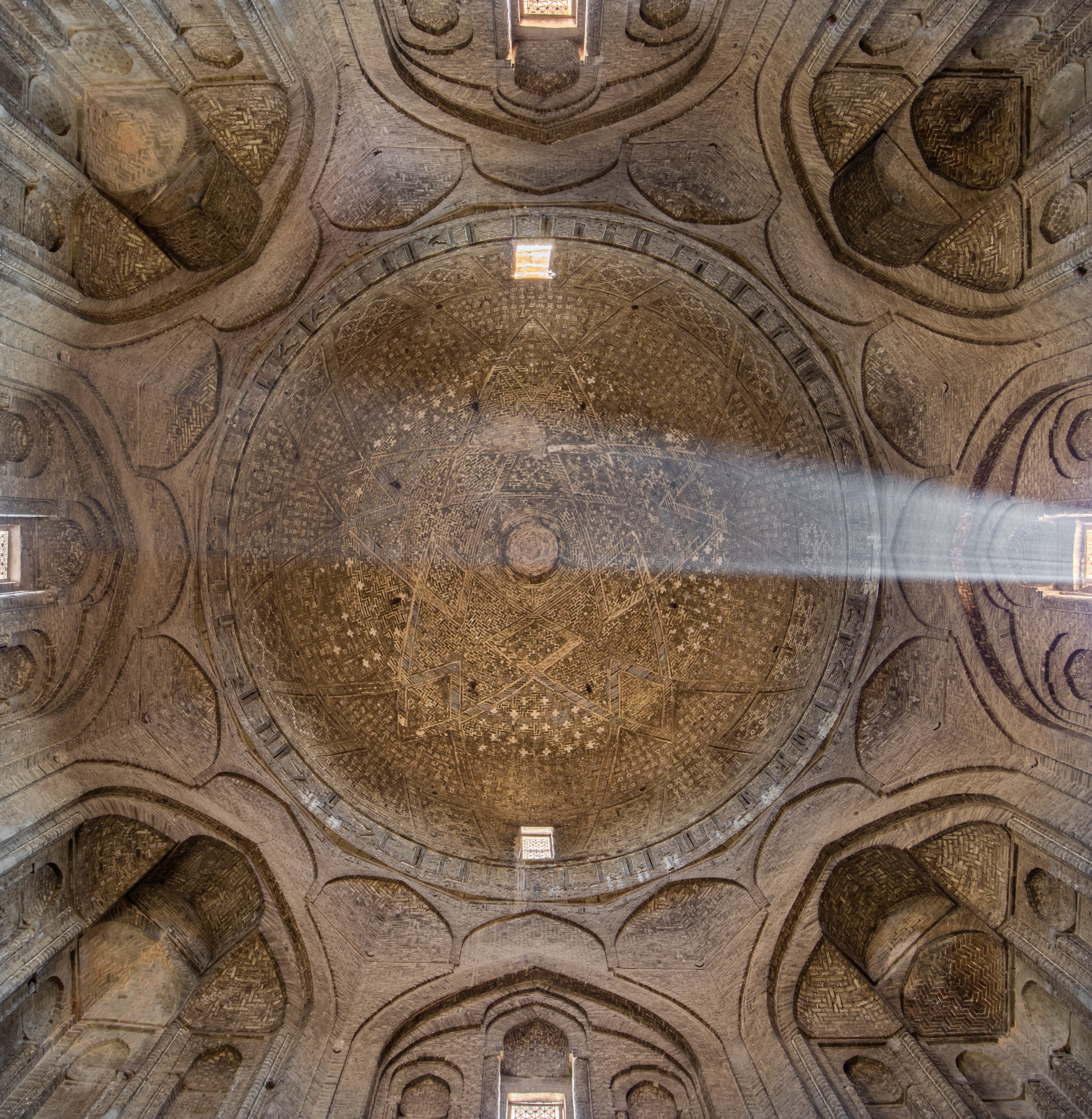
North dome in the Friday mosque of Isfahan, Iran, added in 1088–1089 by Seljuk vizier Taj al-Mulk

In 1056, Tughril built a Friday mosque with a newly constructed quarter in Baghdad which was surrounded by a wall. The new quarter separated the Shia community from the Sunnis, since there had been frequent outbreaks of violence. Through the influence of Tughril's vizier, al-Kunduri, a Hanafi Sunni, the Ash'ari and Ismaili Shi'ites were exiled from Khurasan and cursed at Friday sermons in Seljuk mosques. Al-Kunduri's vizierate persecuted Ash'aris and Sharifis, although this ended with the vizierate of Nizam al-Mulk. It was under the vizierate of al-Kunduri that the Islamic scholar, al-Juwayni was forced to flee to Mecca and Medina. In 1065, Alp Arslan campaigned against the Kingdom of Georgia, subjugated Tbilisi, and built a mosque in the city.

In 1092, Malik-Shah built the Jami al-Sultan Mosque in Baghdad. At the capital, Isfahan, Malik-shah had constructed a madrasa, a citadel and a castle near Dizkuh. Following Malik-Shah's death, the familial civil war drew attention away from religious patronage, slowing the building of madrasas and mosques. Although in 1130, the Seljuk sultan Sanjar ordered the construction of the Quthamiyya madrasa in Samarkand.

While the Seljuk sultans were prodigious builders of religious buildings, Seljuk viziers were no different. The Seljuk vizier, Nizam al-Mulk, founded the first madrasa in Baghdad in 1063, called the Nizamiya. In the madrasas he built, he patronized Shafi'is. The vizier Taj al-Mulk and Malik-shah's widow, Terken Khatun, patronized the building of a madrasa to compete with Nizam al-Mulk's Nizamiya.

=== Control over the Abbasids in Iraq (1055–1135) ===
The region of Iraq was under the control of the Seljuk Empire from 1055 to 1135, since the Oghuz Turk Tughril Beg had expelled the Shi'ite Buyid dynasty. Tughril Beg entered Baghdad in 1055 and was the first Seljuk ruler to style himself Sultan and Protector of the Abbasid Caliphate. From that time, the Abbasids were only puppets in the hands of the Seljuks. In 1058, the Abbasid caliph granted Tughril the title of "King of East and West", officially becoming the temporal protector of Abbasid caliph Qa'im. Iraq remained under the control of the Great Seljuks during the reign of Muhammad I Tapar (1082–1118 CE), but from 1119, his 14-year-old son Mahmud II (1118–1131) was restricted ruling Iraq, while Ahmad Sanjar took control of the rest of the Empire.

In order to counter the ambitions of Abbasid Caliph al-Mustarshid (1118–1135), who wanted to acquire world dominance, in 1124 Mahmūd granted the city of Wasit to Imad al-Din Zengi as an iqta, and conferred him the Military Governorship of Basra together with Baghdad and the whole of Iraq in 1126. In 1127, Imad al-Din Zengi was named Governor of Mosul, where the Atabegdom of Mosul was formed. The Seljuk control of the Abbasids ended in 1135, with direct military confrontation between the Abbasids and the Seljuks: after rebuilding the walls of Baghdad and recreating a Caliphal after many centuries, al-Mustarshid confronted the subordinate Seljuk Sultan of Iraq Mas'ud in battle. The caliph lost and was taken prisoner, and died in captivity in 1135, but conflicts continued with Al-Mustarshid's successors. Mas'ud briefly recaptured Baghdad in the Siege of Baghdad (1136), forcing Caliph al-Rashid Billah to abdicate, but the next caliph, al-Muqtafi (1136–1160), managed to restore a high degree of independence and successfully resisted the Seljuk siege of Baghdad (1157).

== Military ==
=== General overview ===
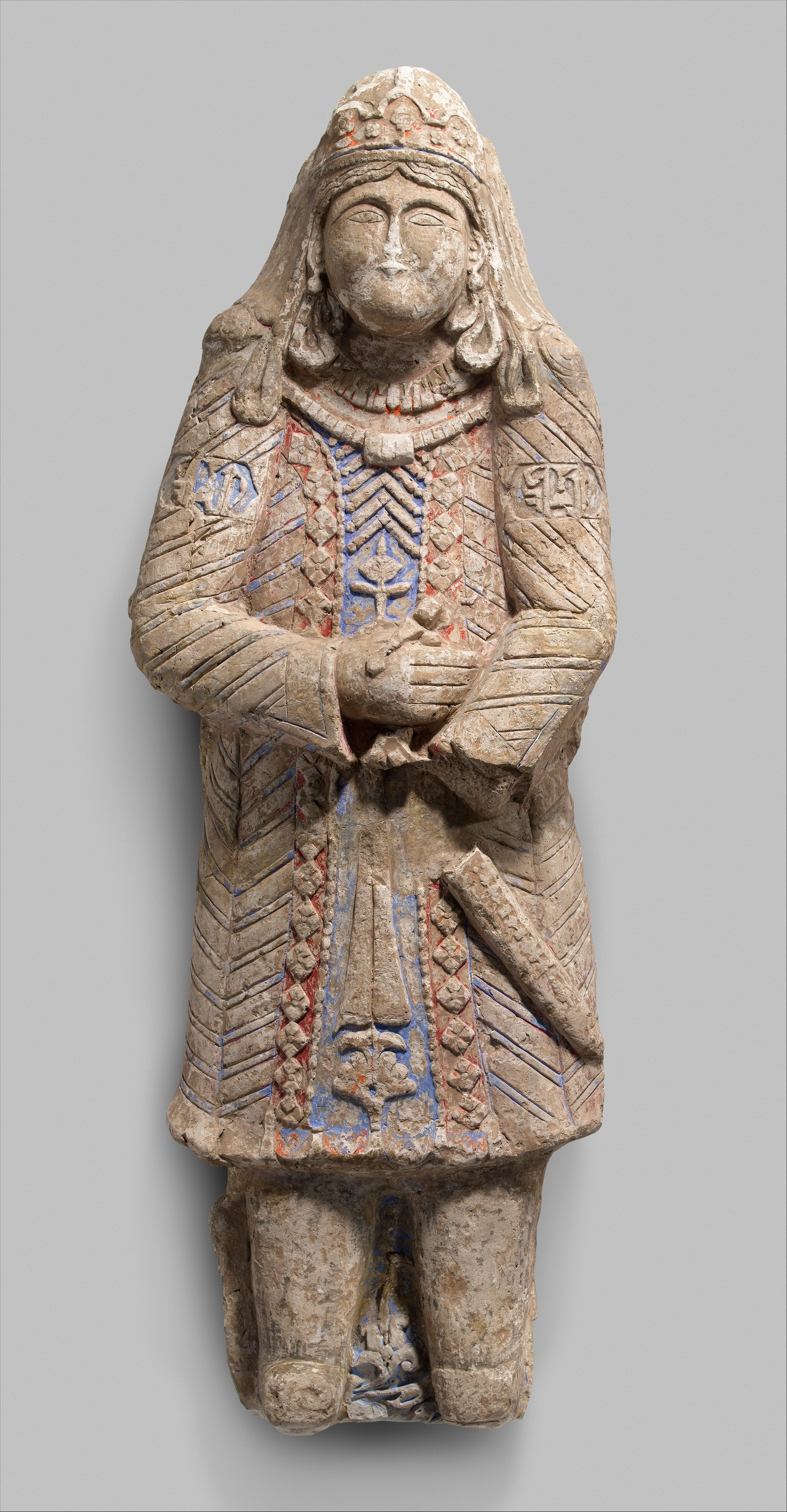
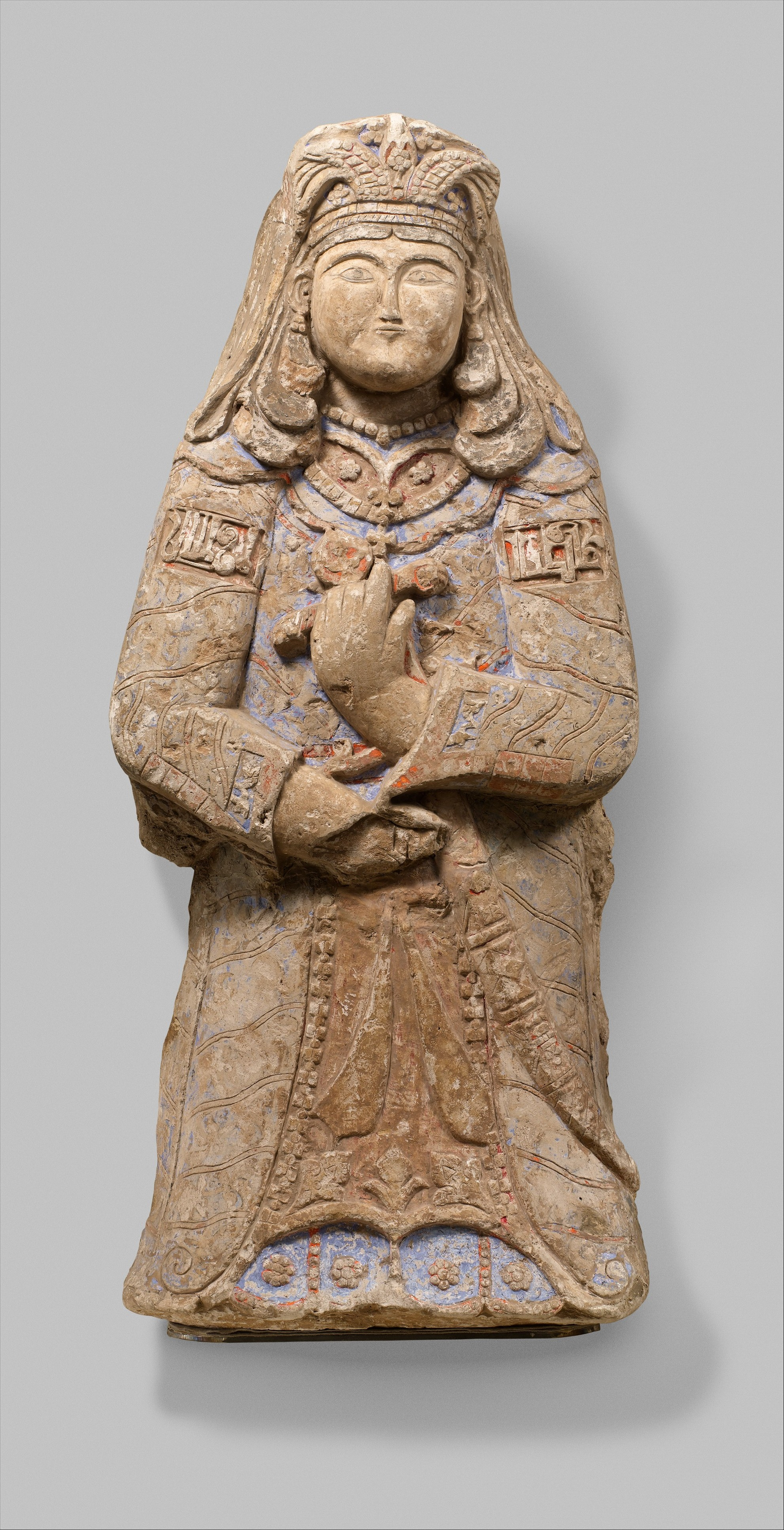
Princely figures related to the Seljuk sultan or one of his local vassals or successors, Seljuk period, Iran, late 12th–13th century

The army of the earliest Seljuks was not similar to the renowned Turkic military of the classical Abbasid era. Their first invasions were more of a great nomadic migration accompanied by their families and livestock rather than planned military conquests. They were not a professional army; however, warfare was a way of life for nearly all of adult male Turkmens.

According to a Seljuk vizier, Nizam al-Mulk, by the reign of Malik-Shah I, the sovereign had a large army at his disposal. There were Turkmens, mamluks, a standing army, infantry and the sultan's personal guard. Nizam al-Mulk also estimated Malik-Shah's forces at 400,000 men, and often opposed cost-cutting plans (instituted by Taj al-Mulk) to bring these to 70,000.

=== Turkmens ===
Vizier Nizam al-Mulk, the greatest advocate of Iranian orientation for the Seljuk empire, admitted the debt the dynasty owed to the Turkmens. After the establishment of the Seljuk state, Turkmens continued to be the driving force behind the Seljuk expansion in Anatolia. After the rule of Malik-Shah I, however, there are very few mentions of Turkmens in the Jibali region of the state, especially in their traditional axis of Rayy, Hamadhan and Hulwan.

Turkmens were difficult to manage, and they were susceptible to undisciplined pillaging. The greatest issue, however, was their dependence on pasturelands for their livestock. A great number of regions that constituted the Seljuk state were ecologically ill-suited for supporting a nomadic army. Turkmens' limitations are adeptly described by Arab scholar Sibt ibn al-Jawzi:

The sultan (Tughril I) ordered his soldiers to prepare [themselves] and to send to bring their tents, children and families to Iraq and to head to Syria with him. They said, "This land is ruined, there is neither food nor fodder here and we have no funds left. We cannot stay [indefinitely] on the backs of horses. What if our families, horses and beasts come, but our absence becomes drawn out? We must visit our families, so we are asking for permission to return to them and to go back to the place which is assigned to us."

Long campaigns had to be discontinued due to Turkmens' insistence on returning home, and conquests had to be scheduled to satisfy the demands of Turkmens. The short-term needs of Turkmens made longer-term military plans unachievable.

=== Iqta' Army ===
This system, previously used by the ancient Islamic states, was established for military purposes during the Great Seljuk period during the reign of Sultan Malik-Shah I and gained a significant place in the military sphere. The army the Great Seljuks established using this system was called the Iqta' Army. The Ikta system, reorganized by Vizier Nizam al-Mulk, both trained soldiers and increased the prosperity of these lands. The Iqta' System underwent centralization movements during the Sanjar era. This army resembled the Timar Army of the Ottoman Empire.

=== Palace Ghilmans or Special Army ===
The Palace Ghilmans or Special Army, were an army troops paid by the state and tasked with protecting the imperial palace and the sultan during the Seljuk period. These troops also served as the Seljuk sultan's personal guard during battles and campaigns. For example, at the Battle of Manzikert, 4,000 ghilman formed the central army of the Seljuk Sultan Alp Arslan. Furthermore, these troops were of Sipahi origin.

=== Mamluks ===
The alternative to nomadic Turkmen troops was mamluks. While also of Turkic and often nomadic origin, dependence on pasturelands was non-existent for mamluks, as they did not live a nomadic life. Previously, mamluks had constituted the later Abbasid, the Samanid, and the Ghaznavid armies. In fact, the Ghaznavid dynasty was itself of Mamluk origin.

The process of Mamluk recruitment is well known from other periods in Islamic history, but there is almost no information directly relating to the Seljuks. The chief source of Mamluks was most probably forays to the steppe. The alternative to raids was buying them from slave traders and various dealers as evidenced from a slave dispute between a merchant and Muhammad I Tapar.

=== Military of successor states ===
Many depictions of military figures are known from the period immediately following the Seljuk Empire (which ended in 1194), as illustrated manuscripts started to enjoy a major boom from circa 1200. Seljuk styles of military equipment continued during the 13th century in the Turkic post-Seljuk successor states (generally included under the term "Seljuk period"), such as the Seljuk Rums, the Zengids, the Artuqids or the Khwarizmians, and are documented in their manuscripts.

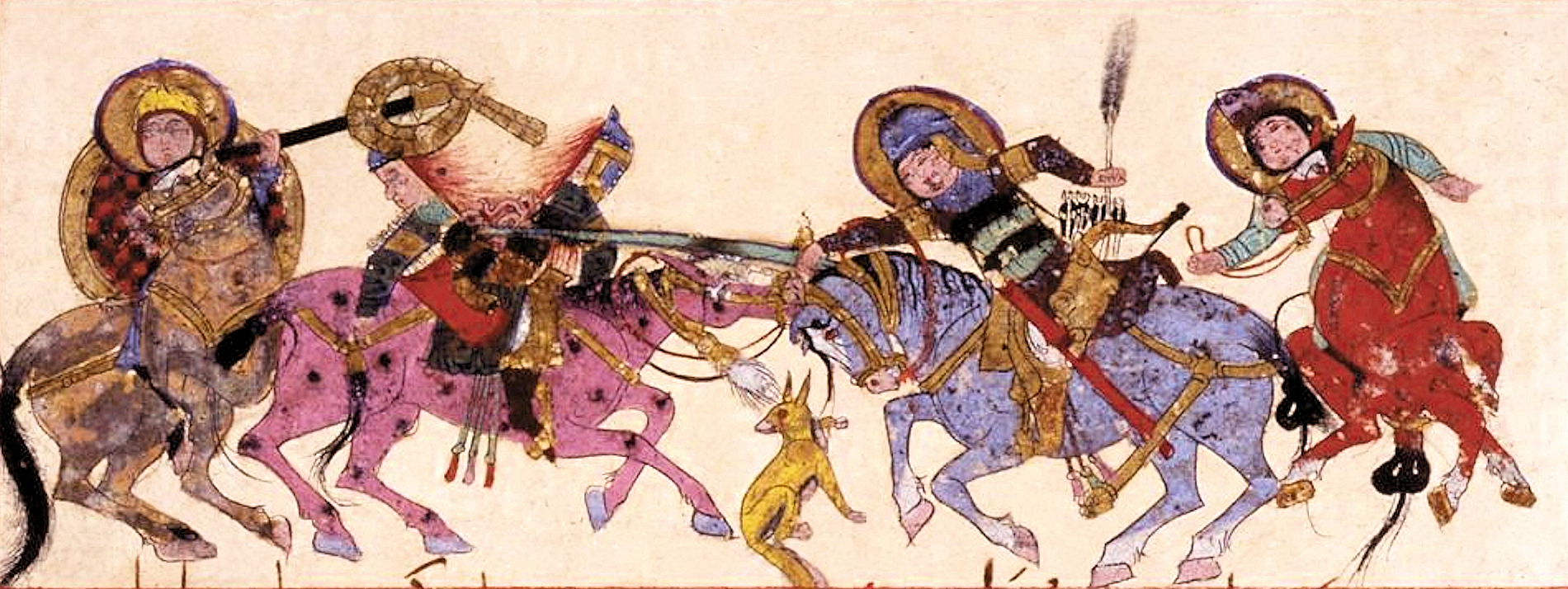
Battle scene, in Varka and Golshah, mid 13th century Seljuk Anatolia

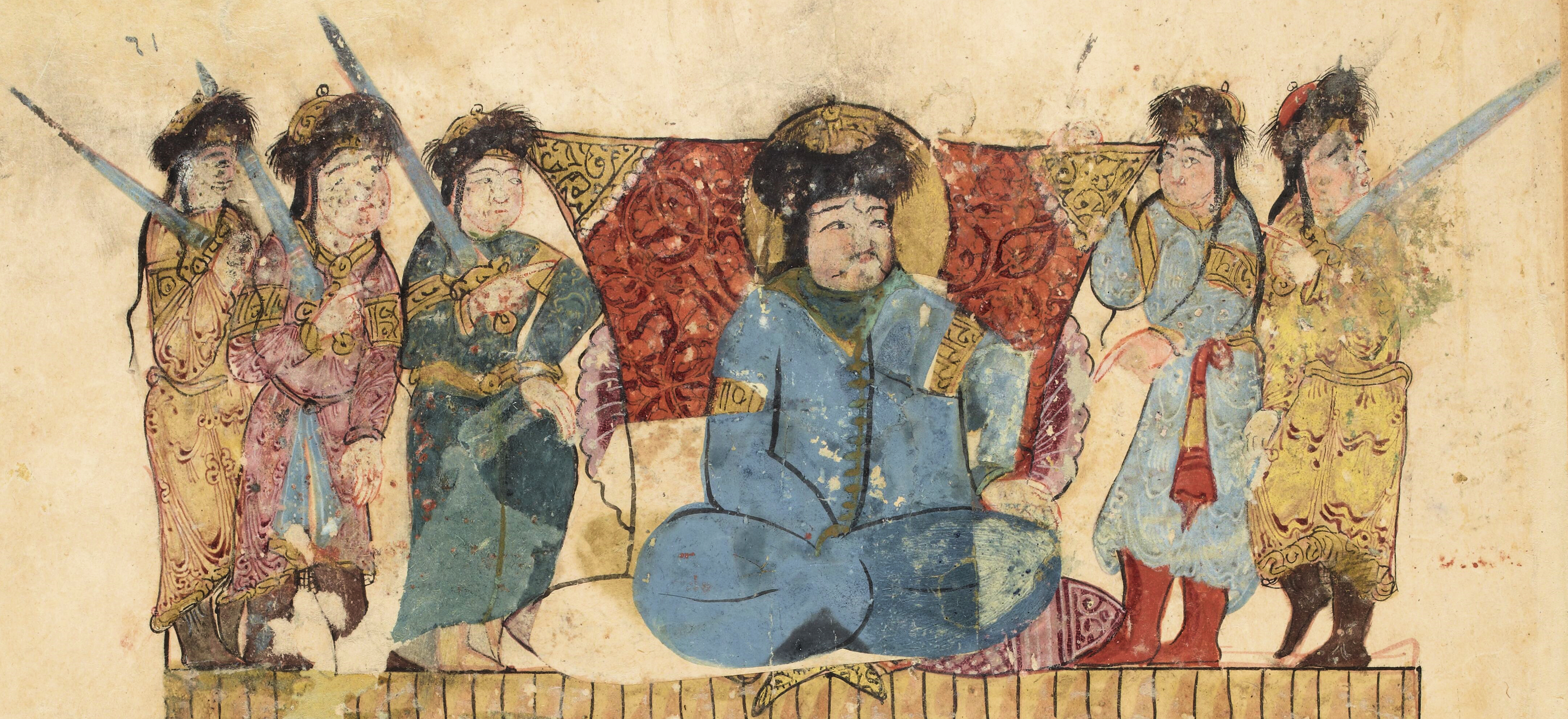
Turkic amir with guards in Maqamat al-Hariri, wearing the sharbush headgear, the three-quarters length robe, and boots, at Rayy, Iran, 1237.

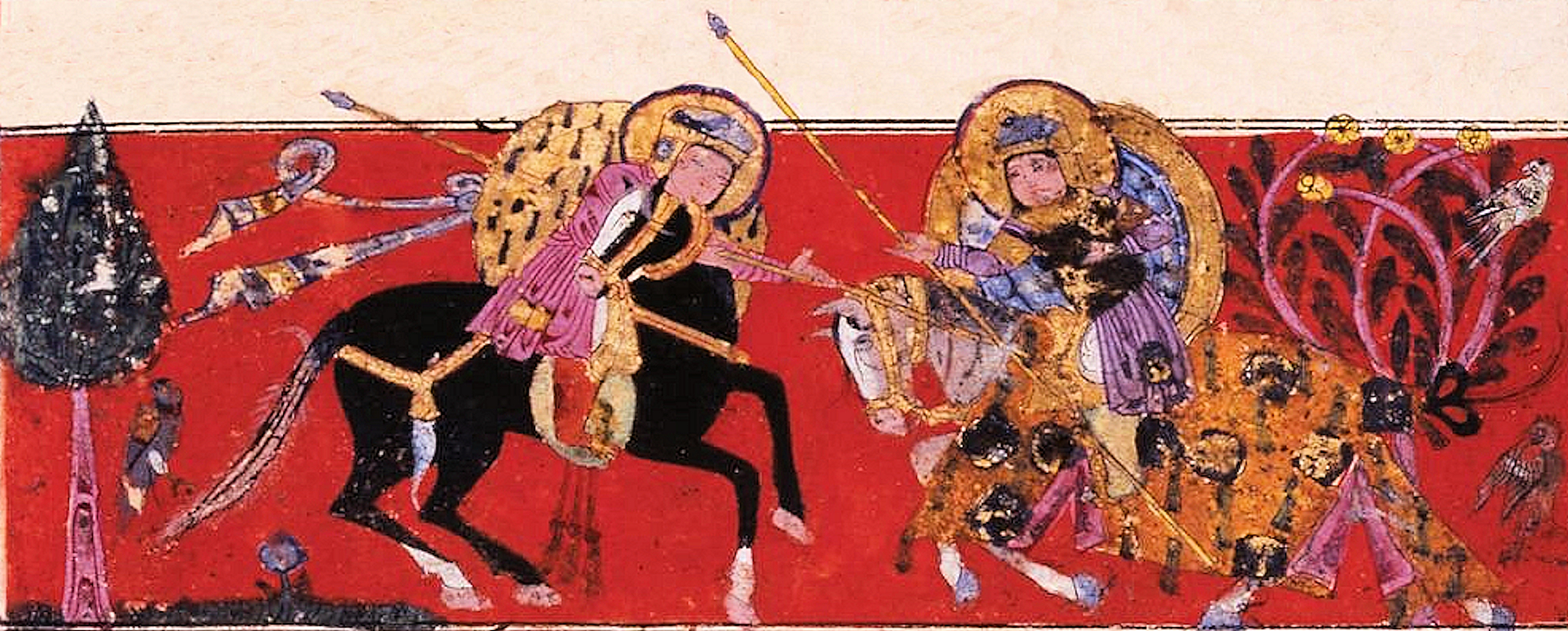
Horsemen duel in Varka and Golshah, mid 13th century Seljuk Anatolia

== Architecture ==
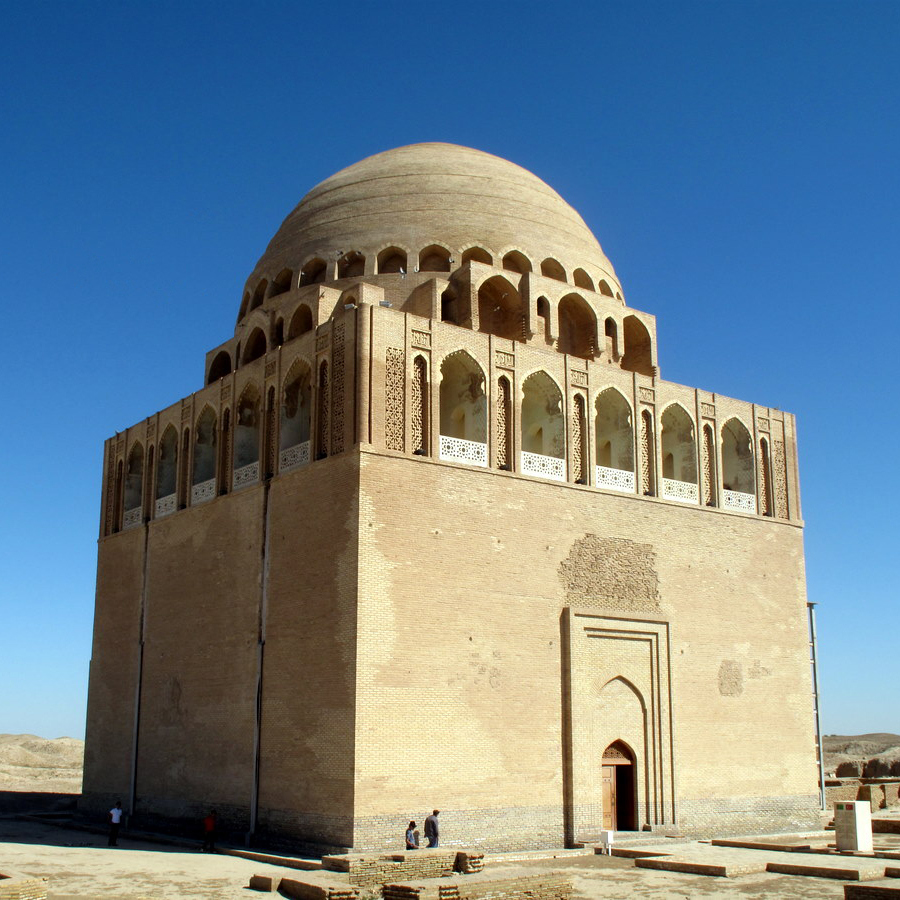
Mausoleum of Sultan Sanjar (1152), Merv, Turkmenistan

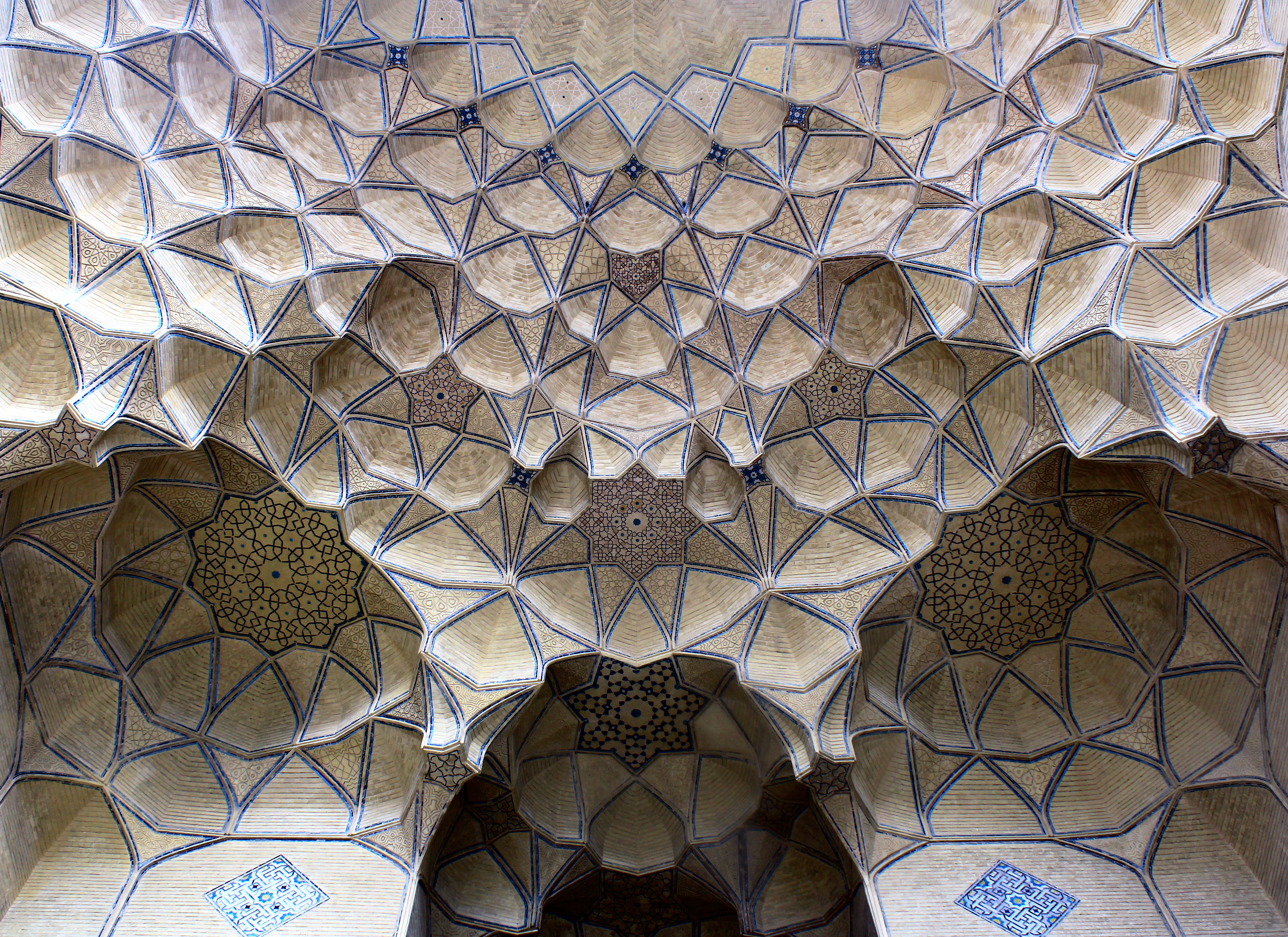
Muqarnas in an iwan of the Friday mosque of Isfahan (early 12th century)

Mosques and madrasas were created and embellished during the period of Seljuk control. Congregational mosques were either repaired, rebuilt, or constructed in their entirety. The Seljuk sultan also commissioned numerous madrasas to promote the teaching of orthodox Islamic sciences. These developments in architectural practice are coherent with the Seljuk dynasty's focus on Islam and the promotion of Muslim orthodoxy, the combining of Sufism and Sunnism.

Overall, the architecture attributed to the Seljuk period is characterized by elaborate decoration, much like the other arts produced under Seljuk rule. Decoration was primarily executed in elaborate brickwork and in the use of colorful glazed tiles. The most important innovations of this period occurred in the form of mosques, as first seen in the renovations of the Friday mosque of Isfahan. One was the introduction of the four-iwan plan. This was attested in some earlier buildings, but under the Seljuks it turned into a common characteristic of mosques, madrasas, and caravanserais in Iran and Central Asia, eventually influencing architecture in Syria, Mesopotamia, and Anatolia as well. Another major innovation was the creation of monumental domes over the space in front of the mihrab (or the maqsura), which also became characteristic of later mosques in this region and beyond.

Another architectural form that flourished during the Seljuk period was the muqarnas, a form of three-dimensional geometric decoration. Some interpretations maintain that the earliest known examples of muqarnas were constructed during the period of Seljuk hegemony, though it also remains possible that they were being developed at the same time in North Africa. The layering of multiple embellished cells with divergent profiles in muqarnas creates a dome that has a seemingly-insubstantial interior. The play of light on the surface enhances this visual effect. Art historian Oleg Grabar argues that the effect of muqarnas domes embodies Qur'anic water symbolism. Examples of muqarnas also appear in the niches of mosques built during the Seljuk empire.

== Arts ==
Various art forms were popularized during the Seljuk period, as evidenced by the vast amount of surviving artifacts. Most Seljuk arts are known to have been produced in what is modern-day Iran. However, the Seljuk sultans also encouraged artists to settle in Anatolia as part of a recolonization and reconstruction process in several cities. Many works of Seljuk art continued to be produced following the decline of the empire in the late 12th century. In this regard, the timeline associated with the production of Seljuk art does not entirely match the political events pertaining to the empire and its eventual fall. Nonetheless, relatively little art can be correctly dated and ascribed to a Great Seljuk context. Much of the material deemed to be Seljuk in world museums in fact belongs to the period A.D. 1150–1250, after the fall of the Great Seljuk Empire, when there seems to have been a sudden burst in artistic production, apparently to a great extent unrelated to court patronage.

=== Ceramics ===
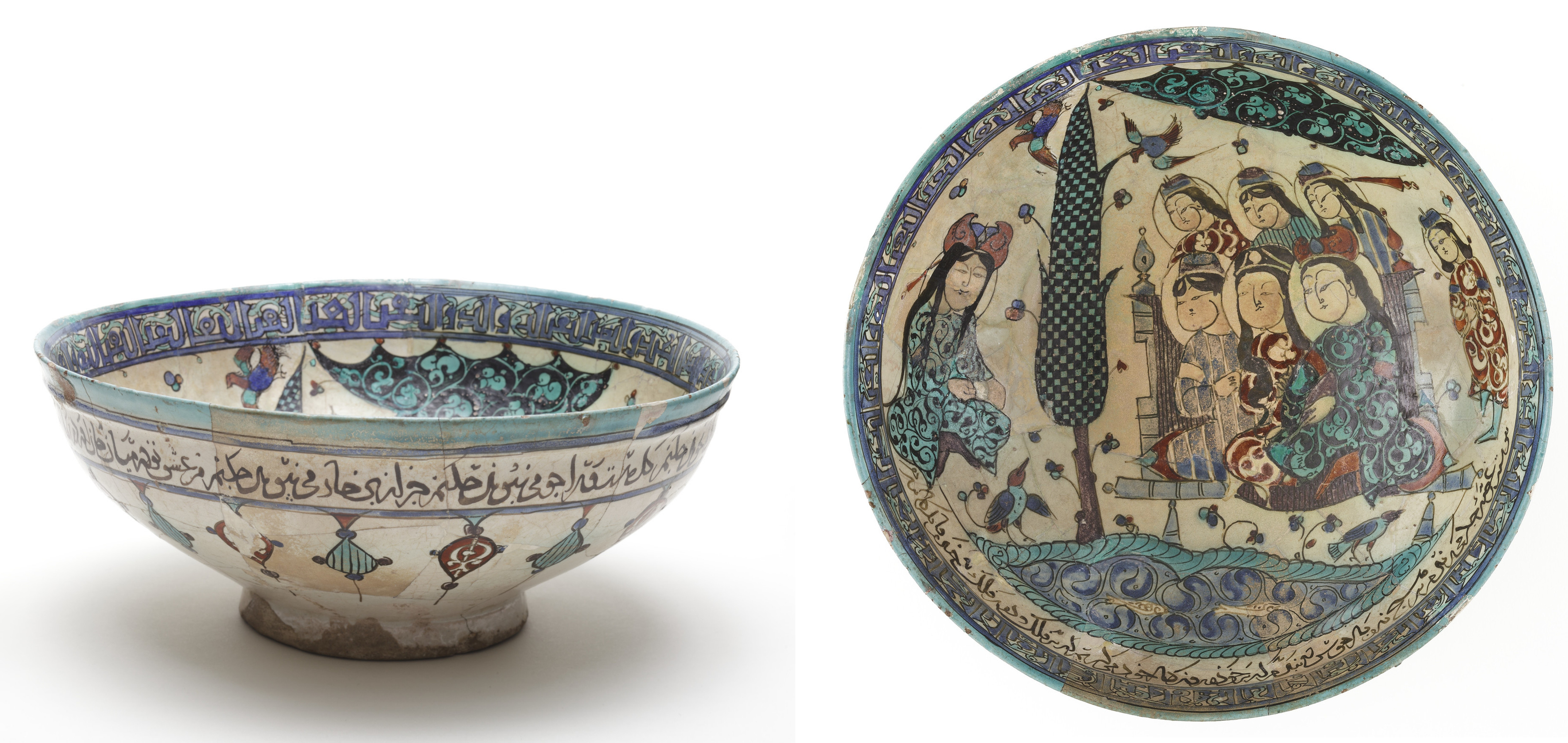
A Mina'i bowl, dated 1187 CE (Muharram 583 A.H.), a few years before the end of the Seljuk Empire in 1194. Scene of poetic recitation, with poetic verses inscribed on the rim: "If the beloved leaves me, what am I to do? If s/he does not see the wisdom of our union, what am I to do?" Kashan, Iran. (Los Angeles County Museum of Art.)

Among other ceramics, the manufacture of polychrome ceramic tiles, often used as decor in architecture, were popularized during the Seljuk dynasty. The Seljuks pioneered the use of the Mina'i technique, a painted and enameled polychrome overglaze for ceramics. The glazes on the Seljuk ceramics produced often ranged from a brilliant turquoise to a very dark blue. The art of Seljuk mosaic tile decorating would continue to dominate the interior of many Anatolian mosques following the period of Seljuk rule. The Seljuks also created ceramic house models, while other ceramic forms in the Seljuk period included pottery figurines, some of them children's toys.

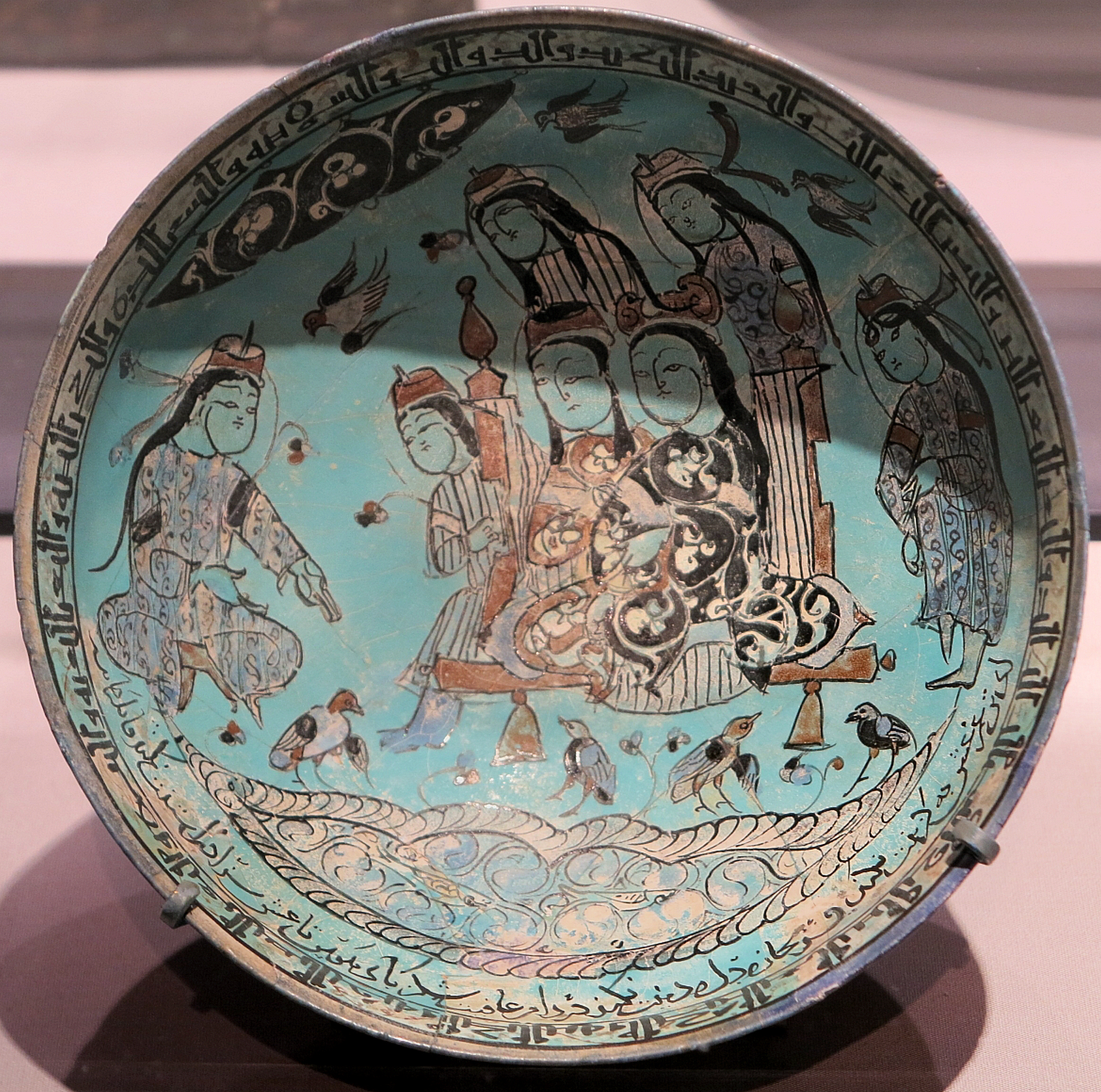
Bowl with Majlis scene by a pond, by Abu Zayd, Iran, dated 1186, MMA.

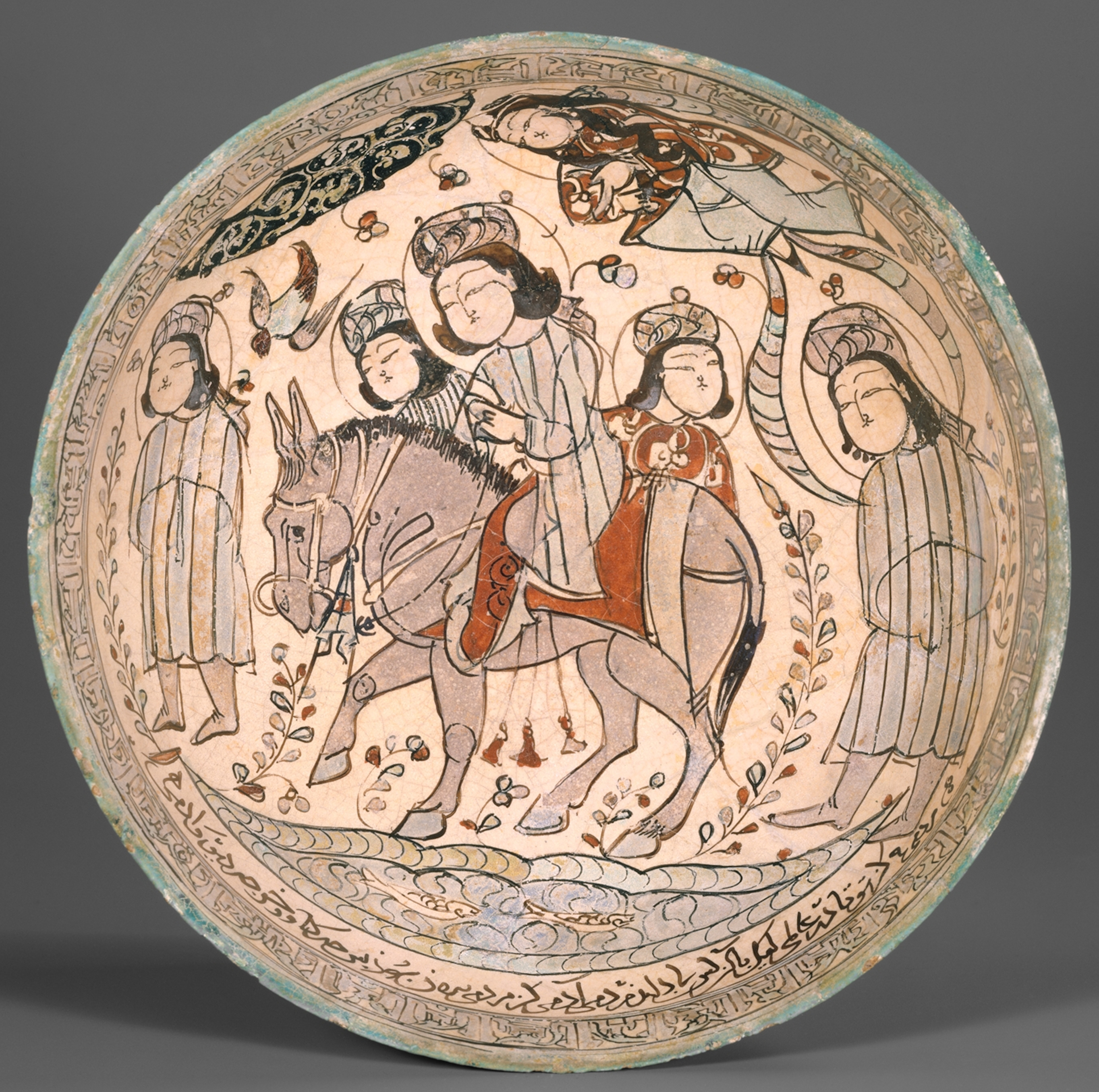
Mina'i bowl signed by Abu Zayd al-Kashani, dated 1187 CE, Iran

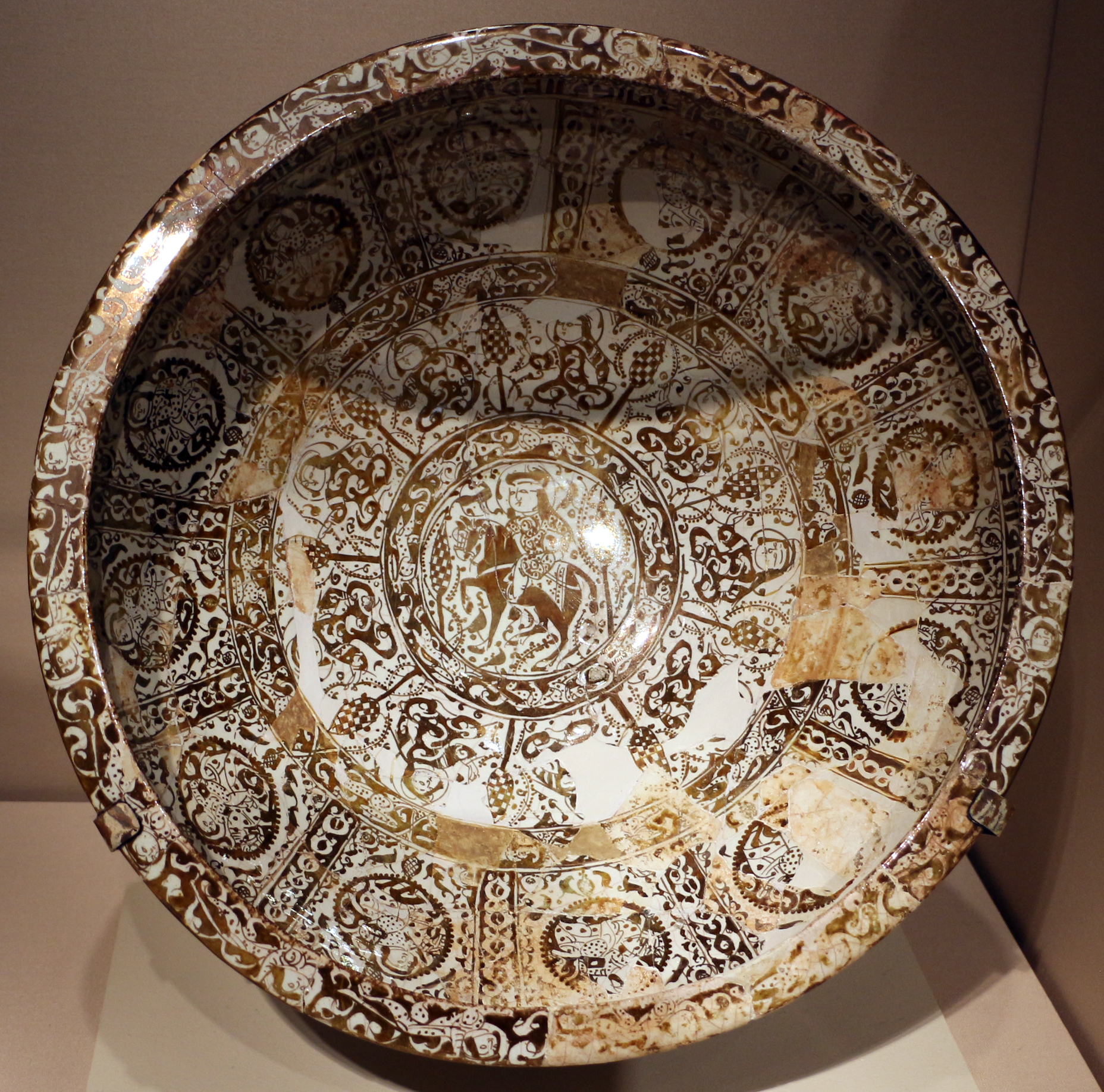
Lustreware great basin signed by Abu Zayd al-Kashani in 1191, Kashan, Iran.

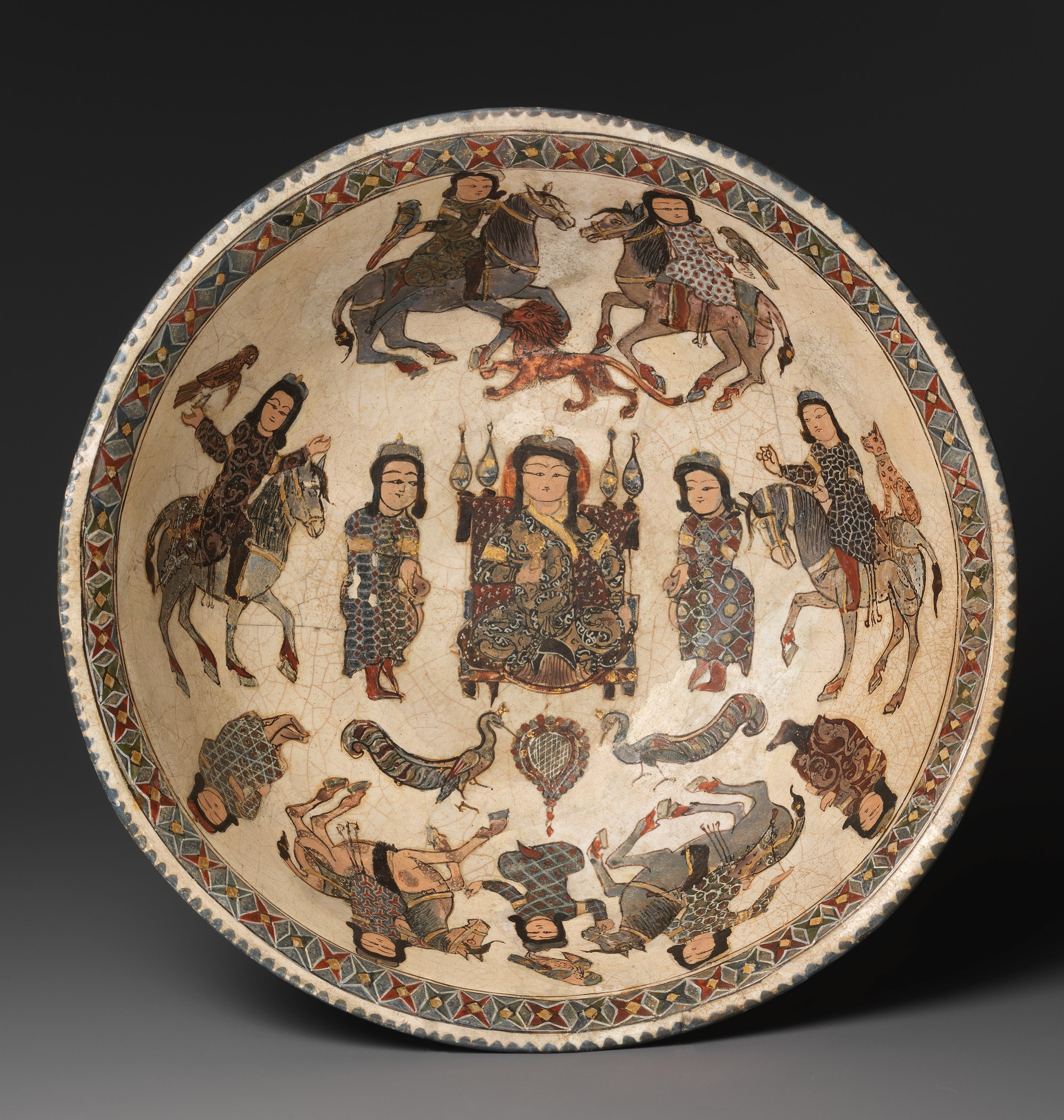
Mina'i bowl of enthroned ruler with attendants and horsemen, a favorite theme in late Seljuq and post-Seljuq art.

=== Art of the book ===
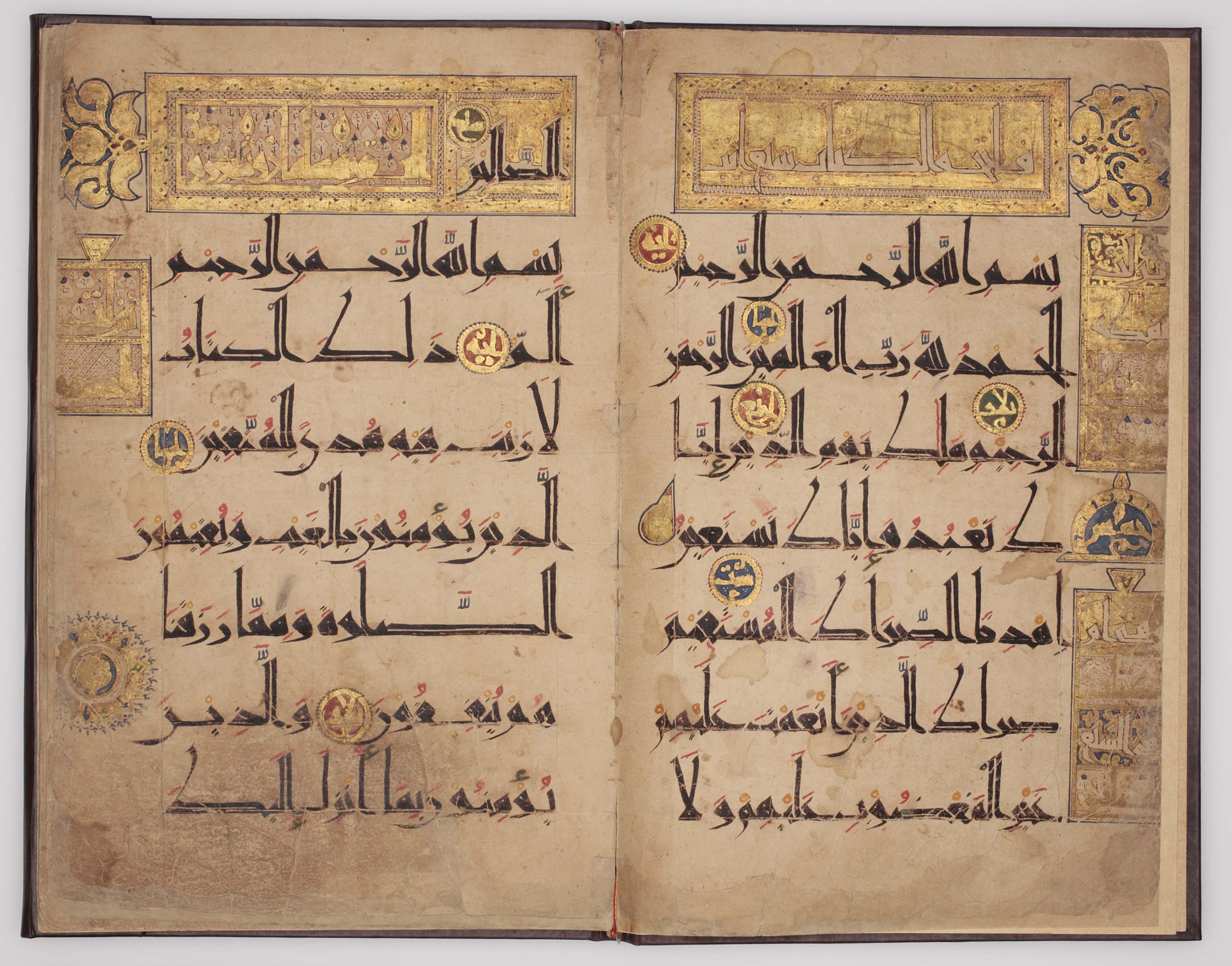
Pages from a Seven-part Quran, Iran, late 11th century Khalili Collection

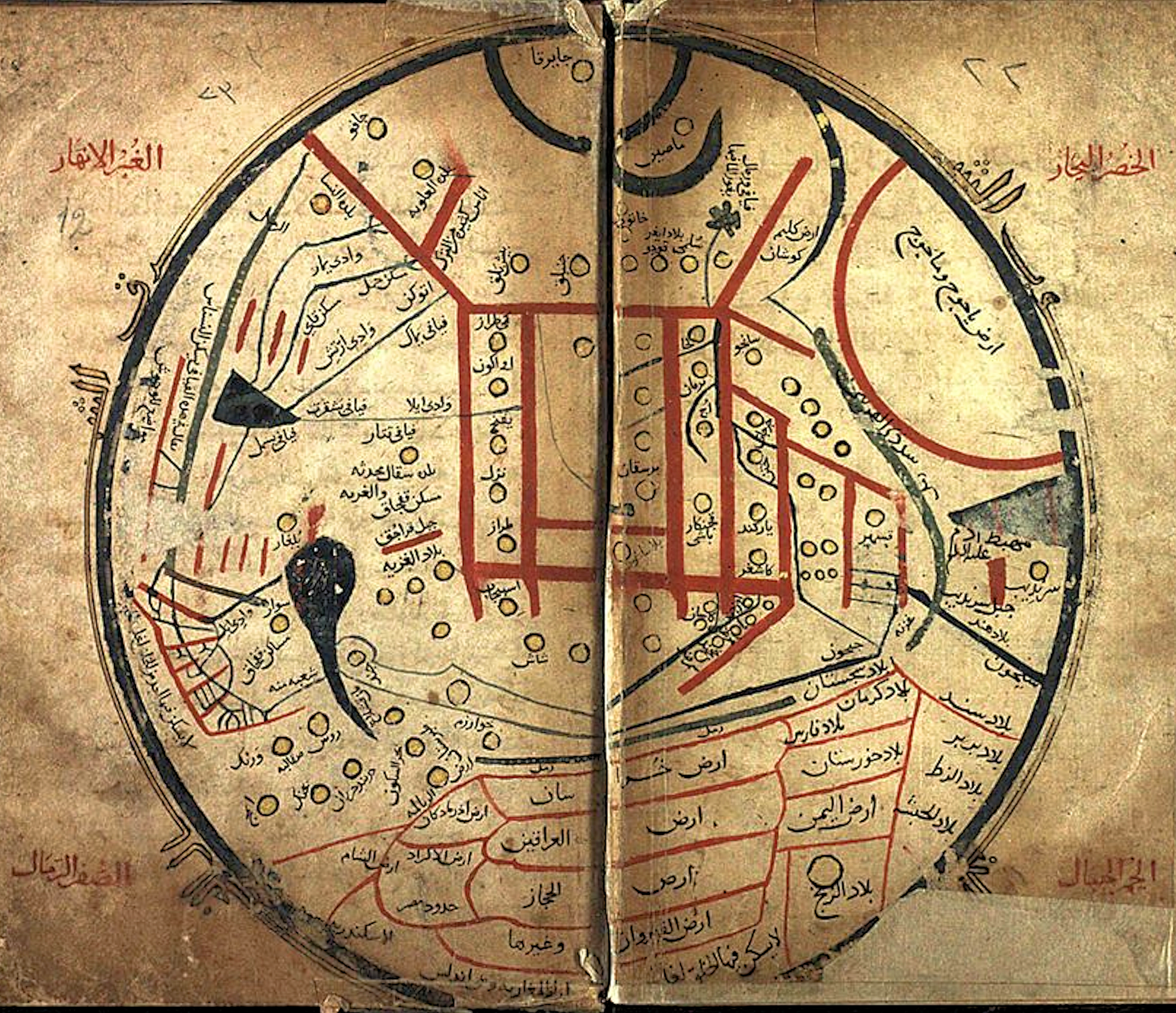
Early world map from Dīwān Lughāt al-Turk ("Compendium of the languages of the Turks"), a Turkish-Arab dictionary by the Kara-Khanid author Mahmud al-Kashgari, written in Seljuk Baghdad in 1072–1074 CE (1266 copy).

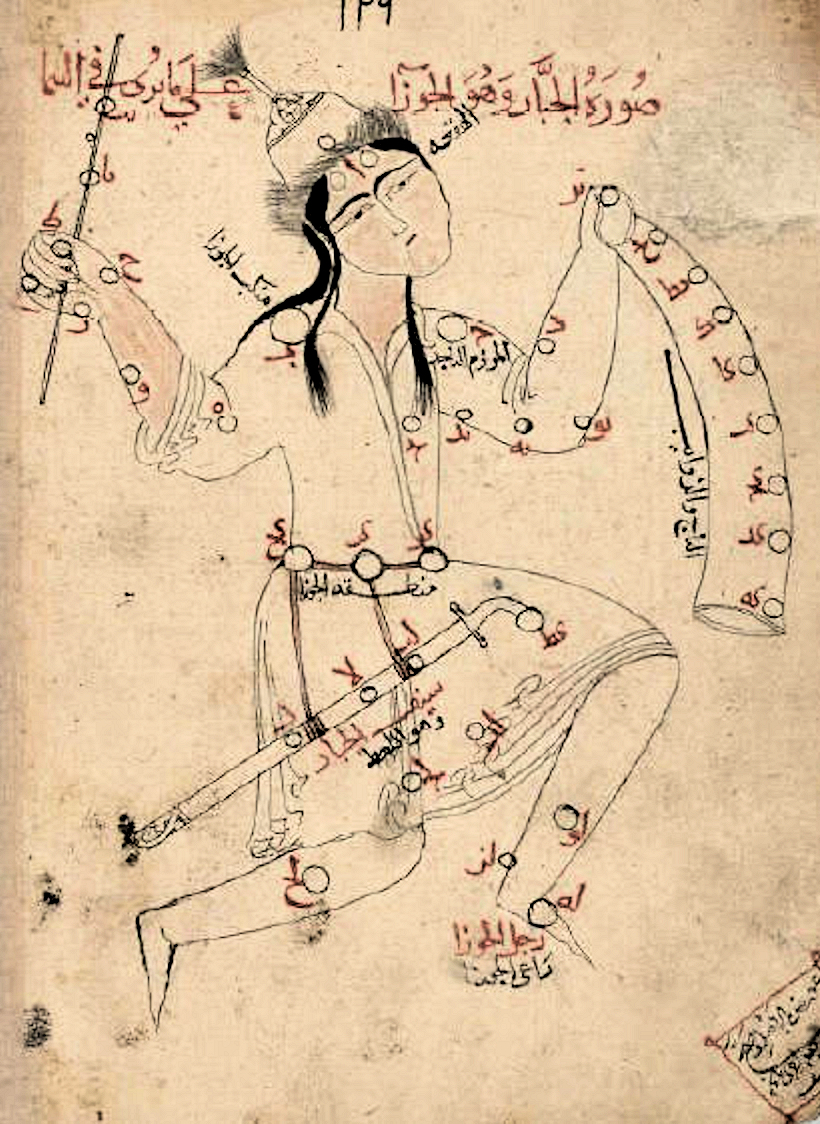
A Seljuk manuscript on astrological figures: Book of Fixed Stars (Kitāb suwar al-kawākib al-ṯābita), by 'Abd al-Rahman ibn 'Umar al-Ṣūfī, dated 1125 CE, Baghdad (controlled by the Seljuks from 1055 to 1135). Doha Museum of Islamic Art MS 2.1998.

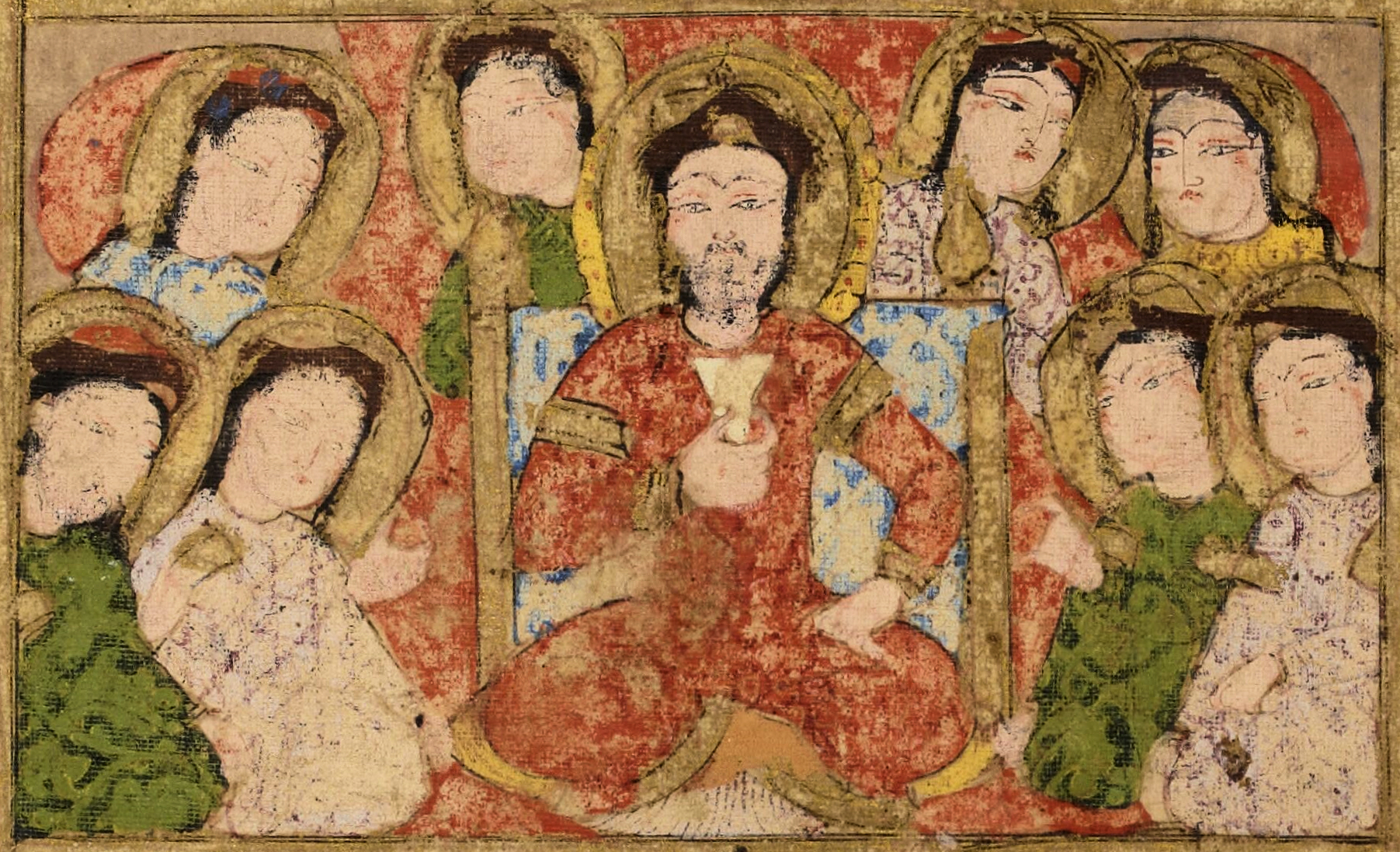
The first known illustrated manuscript of Kitâb al-Diryâq, is dated 1198, around the end of the Seljuk dynasty, and is generally attributed to the Jazira (northern Syria or Northern Iraq).

Both secular and non-secular manuscripts were produced during the Seljuk period. These pieces are now limited in availability, considering their ultimate susceptibility to damage over time. But those manuscripts that have survived over the centuries provide insight into the Seljuks' involvement in the arts of the book. Calligraphers and illuminators were responsible for the creation of these manuscripts, though sometimes calligraphers mastered the art of both writing and illustration. By the end of the 10th century, both illuminators and calligraphers were beginning to employ various colors, styles, and writing techniques in the realm of the book arts.

The Qur'ans produced during the period of Seljuk rule evidence developments in calligraphy and other changes in how the holy text was divided. Uniquely, calligraphers during this period frequently combined several scripts on one page of the Qur'an, such as Kufic and New Style. In addition to these changes in the text, the dawn of the Seljuk empire coincided with a newfound increase in the popularity of paper as a replacement for parchment in the Islamic world. The use of durable paper increased the production of compact, single-volume Qur'ans, whereas parchment codexes often contained multiple volumes of Qur'anic text. Despite this development, parchment would remain popular for the production of some Qur'ans, and multi-volume pieces continued to be produced. Illuminated borders continued to distinguish the Qur'ans produced during the Seljuk period and relative consistency was maintained with regard to their structure.

One example of a manuscript created during Seljuk rule is a thirty-volume (juz) Qur'an created c. 1050, produced by only one calligrapher and illuminator (Freer Gallery of Art, District of Columbia, F2001.16a-b). As paper had just been introduced to the Islamic world, this piece is an early Islamic paper manuscript. This Qur'an is bound in brown leather, dyed in pink, decorated with gold, and offers an intricate frontispiece. These elements imply the care that went into the production of this text and indications of frequent usage confirm that it was appreciated. It is primarily written in the vertical "New-Style" Arabic script, a sharp, vertical script. The dominant use of New Style in this folio, also referred to as "new Abbasid Script", attests to the shift from the geometric Kufic script to a more legible calligraphic style, which occurred in the 10th century. Scattered remnants of Kufic, used primarily to indicate volume and page number, also appear in the text. The verticality of the paper in this manuscript speaks to the historic shift away from the horizontal use of paper in many Qur'ans, also a 10th-century development.

Another example of a religious manuscript produced closer to the end of the period of Seljuk Rule is the Qarmathian Qur'an (dispersed folio, Arthur M. Sackler Gallery of Art, District of Columbia, S1986.65a-b). This manuscript's folios are illuminated with a gold border and thin, spiraled illustration, featuring vegetal motifs. Despite the generous illumination, the four lines of Qur'anic text on the folio are exceptionally legible. Created between the years 1170–1200, this particular folio demonstrates the evolution of New Style, as both vocalized cursive and diacritical dots appear in this later version of the script. Only during the 13th century would New Style be replaced by the curvier proportional scripts for regular use.

A final example of a Seljuk Qur'an that has entered into scholarship is a manuscript studied in-depth by the art historian Richard Ettinghausen. This piece was written in 1164 by Mahmud Ibn Al-Husayn and contains the entirety of the Qur'an (University of Pennsylvania Museum of Archaeology and Anthropology, Philadelphia, NEP27). Unlike the two Seljuk Qur'ans discussed prior, this manuscript primarily contains Naskh script, another early Arabic script that replaced Kufic. However, some Kufic calligraphy is embedded in the chapter headings. This aspect speaks to how the inclusion of Kufic in Qur'ans became more of a decorative element over time, often included in headings as opposed to the main body of text. The manuscript is large, with seventeen lines of text per two-hundred and fifteen sheets of paper. Though not all of the Qur'an is illuminated, both the beginning and the end boast elaborate illustration, with blue, gold, and white hues. Ettinghausen describes the subsequent visual effect as "brilliant". The inscriptions feature detailed rosettes, vines, medallions, and arabesques, some exclusively as decoration and others to indicate the end of particular lines of Qur'anic text.

Manuscript production during the Seljuk period was not limited to religious texts. Beyond these religious manuscripts, scientific, literary, and historical pieces were created. One example of a secular manuscript is the Nusrat al-fatrah, a historiographical and literary account of the Seljuk period written in 1200 by Imād al-Dīn (Al-Furqan Islamic Heritage Foundation, London). Meanwhile, the scientific manuscripts produced during the Seljuk period oftentimes pertained to geography, physics, mechanics, mathematics, and astronomy. The former Seljuk city of Isfahan not only boasted twelve libraries that contained a total of twelve thousand volumes, but also had an observatory where scholars could record their astrological findings. Secular manuscripts from the Seljuk empire bear illuminations that often relate to the alignment of planets and the zodiac, a couple of examples of common themes.

Whether secular or non-secular, Seljuk illuminated manuscripts had enough influence as to inspire other relevant art forms, such as brass or bronze metal objects. For example, the large Qarmathian Qur'an influenced some of the inscriptions on Seljuk ceramic wares. Even mirrors, candlesticks, coins, and jugs manufactured in Anatolia during the Seljuk period would often bear occult astrological images inspired by manuscripts. Occult knowledge persisted in manuscripts produced after the decline in the Seljuk's political power in the late 12th century, as the Seljuk sultanate's influence on the book arts continued in Anatolia.

Historian Andrew Peacock demonstrates an interest in the Seljuks of Anatolia's focus on occult themes and its manifestation in the book arts. Peacock describes this finding as something that challenges the reigning view that the Seljuks were exclusively the "pious defenders of Islam" when it came to larger systems of belief. Some of the occult sciences that the Seljuks took special interest in included geomancy, astrology, alchemy. A relevant occult manuscript from a later period of Seljuk influence in the 13th century is the Dustur al-Munajjimin, otherwise known as the "Rules of Astrologers", while another is the Daqa'iq al-Haqa'iq, or the "Fine Points of Eternal Truths", dating to the Sultanate of Rum in 1272. The latter text captures an interest in magic and spells, with a particular focus on calling upon spiritual beings, such as angels, through ritualistic acts (Bibliothèque nationale de France, Paris, Persan 174). The text was written by a man who wrote under a pen name, "Nasiri". Interestingly, Nasiri's Daqa'iq al-Haqa'iq challenges prevailing Islamic understandings of God while encouraging piety and invoking both Sufi terms and themes. For example, while incorporating a Sufi poem, the occult text speaks of supernatural bodies and disputes what Islam considers to be the accepted number of names for God.

==== Illustrated manuscripts ====
The western area of the Seljuk realm including Syria, Jazira and Iraq saw an "explosion of figural art" from the 12th to 13th centuries, particularly in the areas of decorative art and illustrated manuscripts. This occurred despite religious condemnations against the depiction of living creatures, on the grounds that "it implies a likeness to the creative activity of God". The origins of this new pictorial tradition are uncertain, but Arabic illustrated manuscripts such as the Maqamat al-Hariri shared many characteristics with Christian Syriac illustrated manuscripts, such as Syriac Gospels (British Library, Add. 7170). This synthesis seems to point to a common pictorial tradition which developed from circa 1180 CE in the region, which was highly influenced by Byzantine art.

=== Metalwork ===
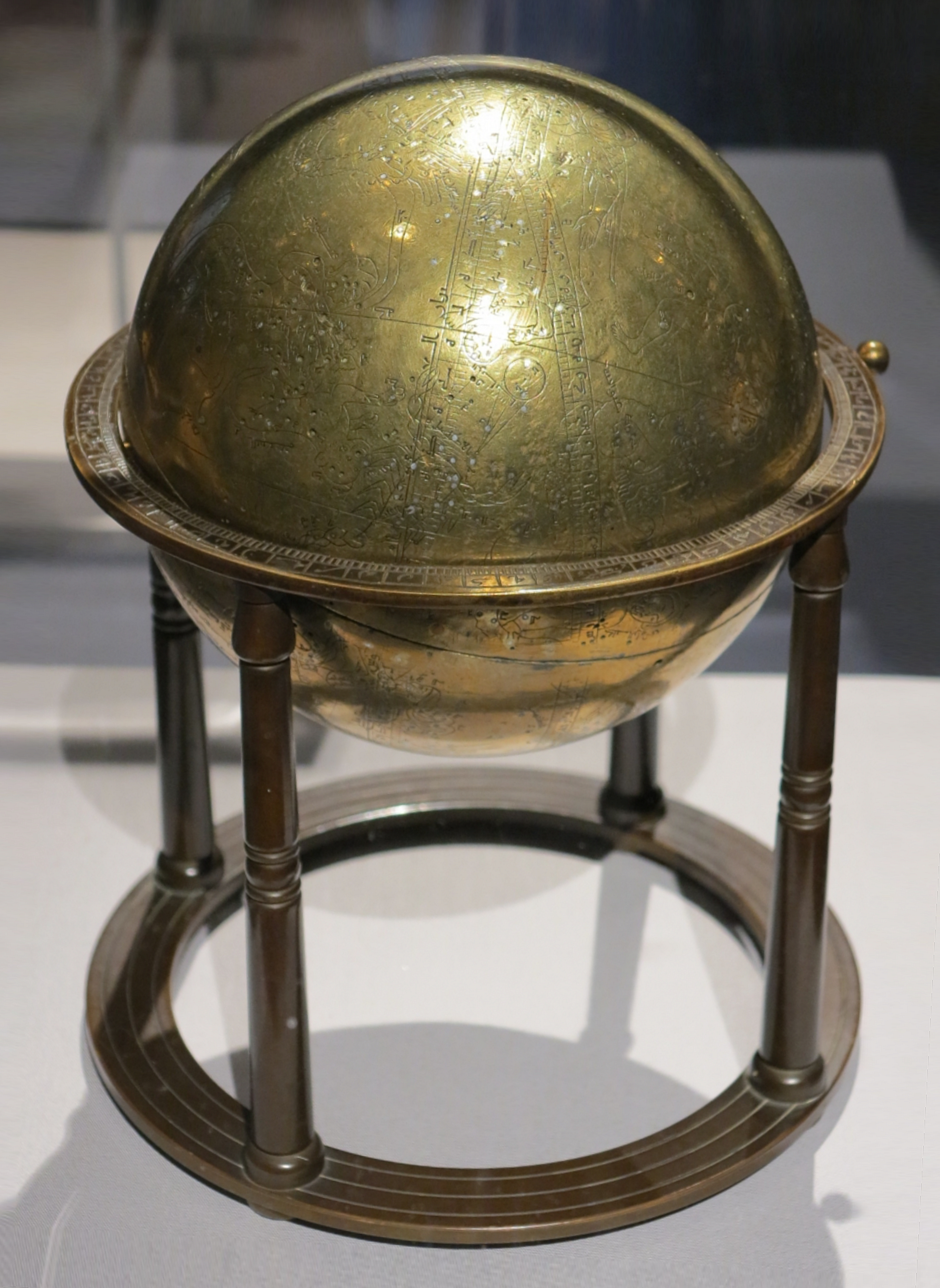
Seljuk celestial globe with stand, Iran, 1144–1145, Louvre Museum. The globe mentions: "This globe includes all the stars mentioned in the book of the Almagest after modifying them in proportion with the interval between the calculations of Ptolemy and the year [A.H.] 540, i.e. 1144. It is the work of (san'at) Yunis b. al-Husayn al-Asturlabi [in the] year 539".

Starting around the middle of the 12th century, there appears to have been a major increase in the number of artistic metalwork objects produced in the eastern Islamic world (roughly Iran and Central Asia). More of these objects have survived from after the 1140s than from before this period. The major centers of production were initially concentrated in the Khorasan region, including Nishapur, Herat, and Ghazna. There is some scholarly debate about the patronage of these objects, with some suggesting that the growth in production is explainable by the growth of a bourgeoisie in Khorasan which had the means to afford such costly craftsmanship. This is attested in part by inscriptions naming merchant owners, but most surviving objects are nonetheless attributed by their inscriptions to sultans, royal household members, or state officials. In the early 13th century, this expansion of metalwork art and patronage also occurred further west, in the Levant and Mesopotamia, under the successors of the Great Seljuks (the Zengids, the Artuqids, and the Anatolian Seljuks), spurred in part by the immigration of metalworkers from Iran.

Made of bronze or brass, objects could also be inlaid with copper and silver. This latter technique had fallen out of fashion in previous centuries but it underwent a revival that probably originated in Khorasan during this period. The forms produced include both traditional Khorasani types, such as fluted ewers and hooded incense burners, and new shapes, such as penboxes with rounded ends and candlesticks with drum-like bodies. Many metal vessels also featured zoomorphic forms. The most sophisticated works were created by raising and sinking, with decoration executed in repoussé. To create some shapes, multiple metal sheets were carefully soldered together, with the seams made invisible by various means, such as by camouflaging them under decorative friezes. The wide range of ornamental motifs include arabesques, geometric designs, real and mythological animals, and even scenes of human figures such as musicians and horsemen. Arabic inscriptions are found on almost all metalwork art objects. An innovation of this period, almost exclusive to metalwork, is the rendering of Arabic script into figurative forms. The earliest example of this is found on the so-called Bobrinski Bucket.

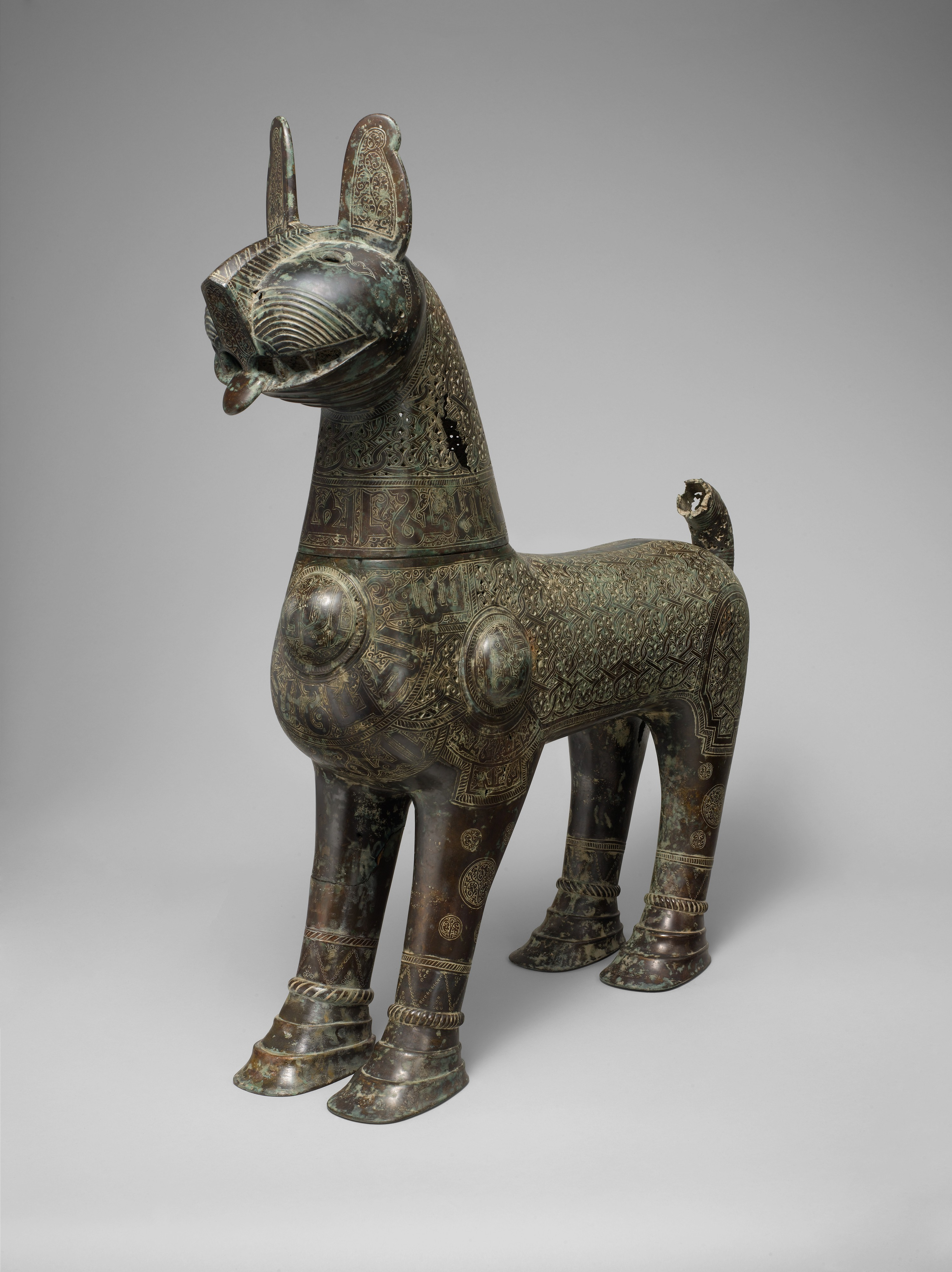
"A demonstration of the excellence achieved in metalwork under the Seljuqs": bronze incense burner shaped like a lion, with removable head, dated 1181–1182 CE, Taybad, Iran. (Metropolitan Museum of Art)

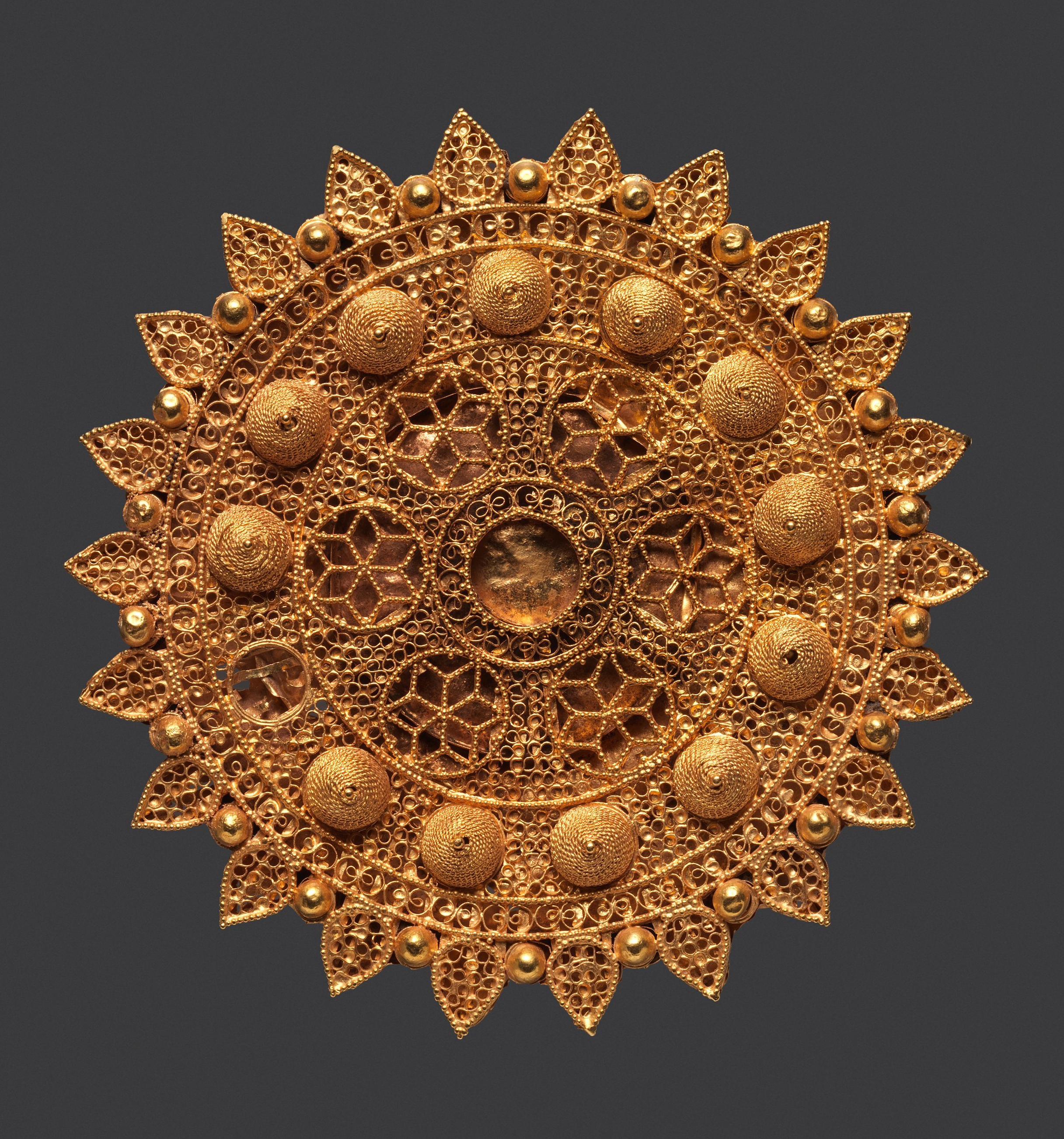
Gold roundel, 11th century Iran. It "exemplifies the refinement of Seljuq goldsmithing".

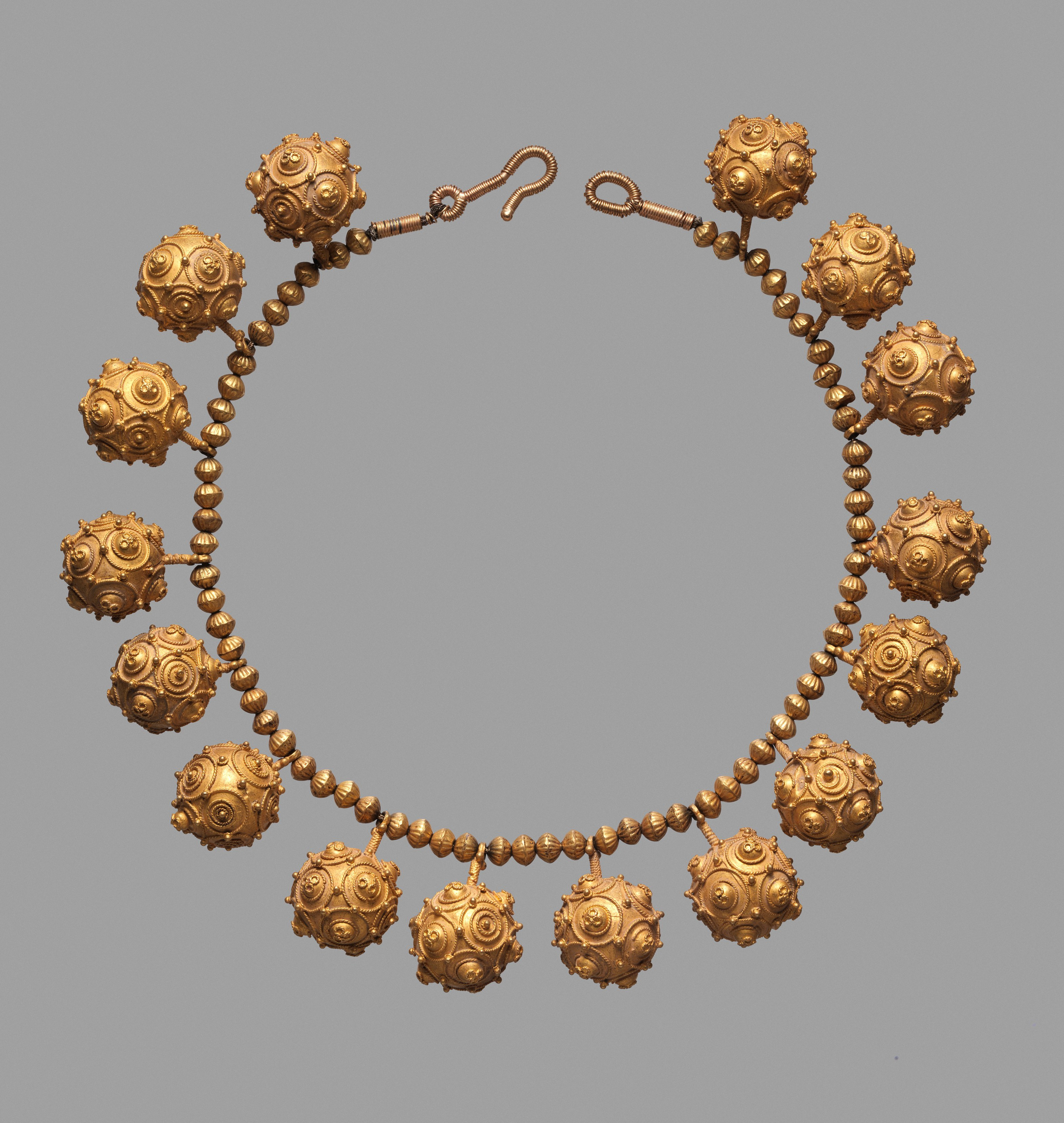
Seljuk gold necklace, 11th century Iran.

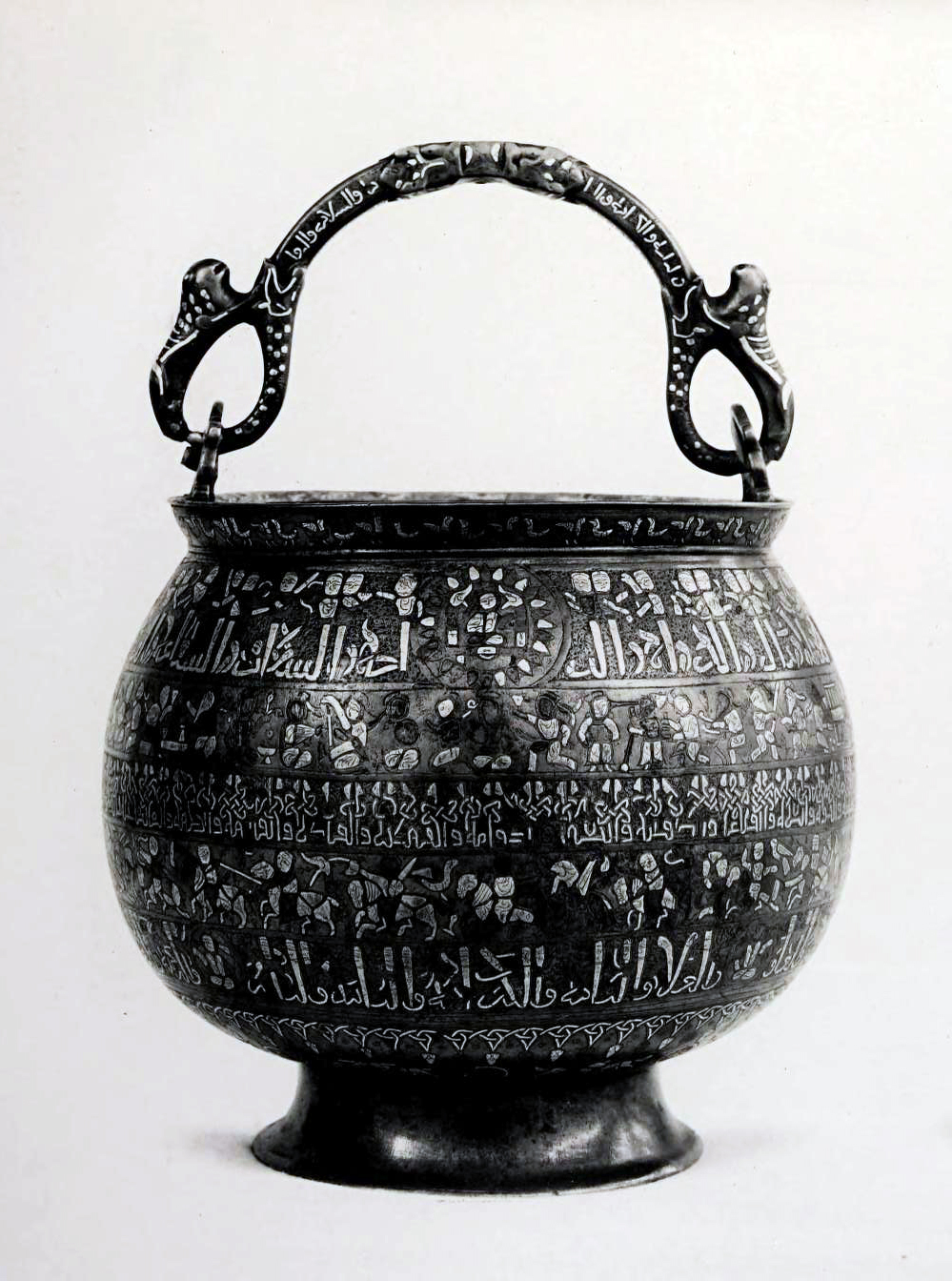
Bobrinski Bucket, a bronze cauldron decorated with human figures. From 1163 CE, Herat, Afghanistan. (Hermitage Museum)

=== Textiles and clothing ===
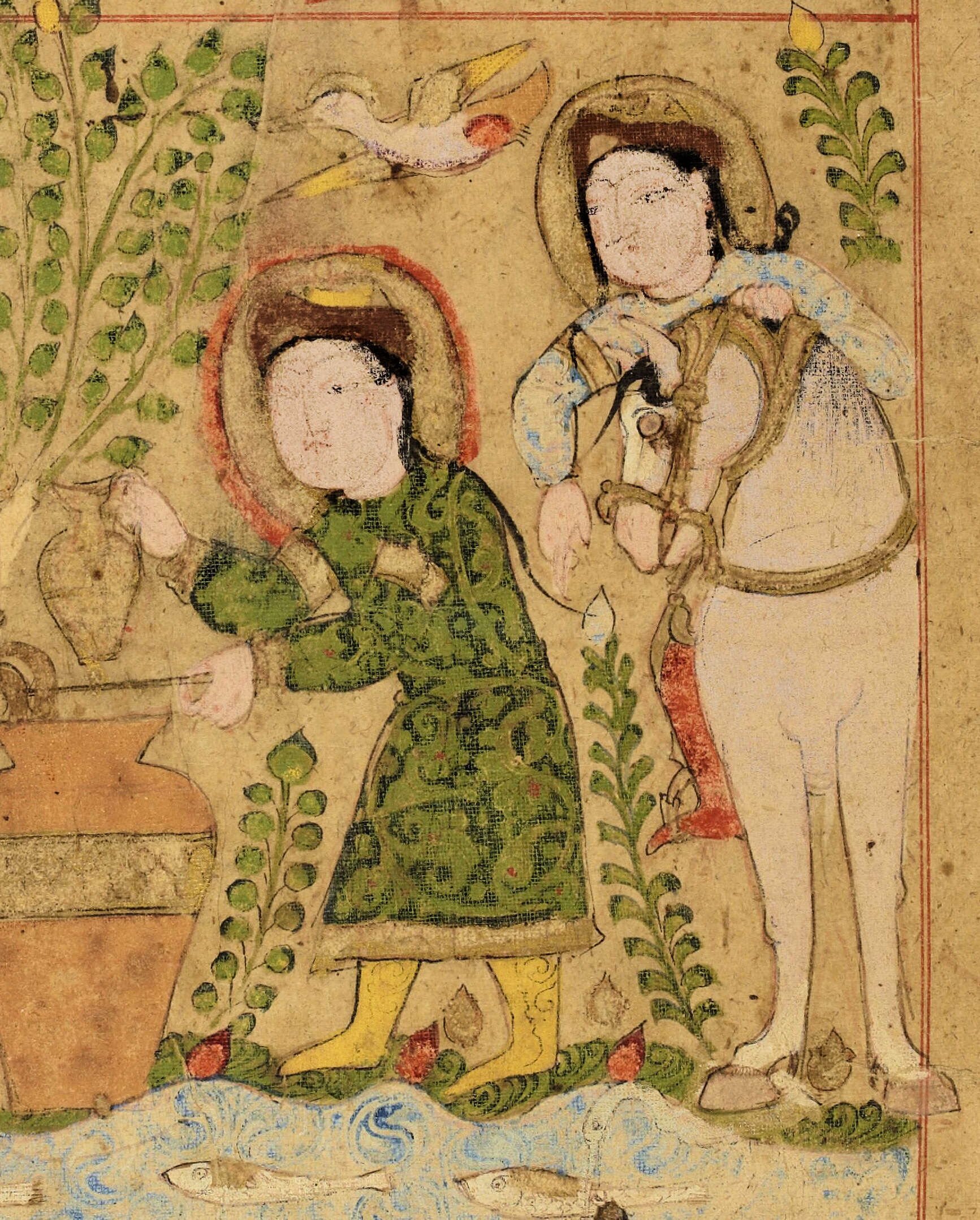
Seljuk period figures in Turkic dress, with aqbiya turkiyya coat, tiraz armbands, boots and sharbush hat. Kitāb al-Diryāq, Jazira, 1198 CE.

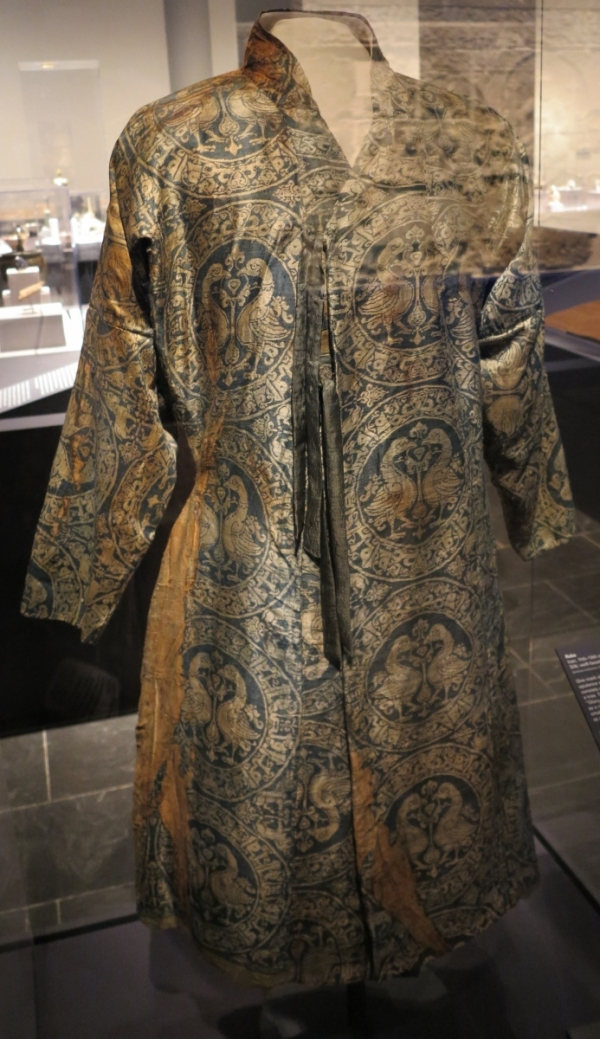
Seljuk silk robe in aqbiya tatariyya style, with birds motifs in medallions (11th–12th century).

The general clothing style attributed to the Seljuks is that of the aqbiya tatariyya, or long robe or decorated caftan with a "Turkish" cut, with a front opening closing diagonally from right to left. Patterned textiles were used, together with tiraz bands on the upper sleeves. Clothing included tall boots, as well as various hats of the sharbush type, often including a fur lining. These styles continued during the 13th century in the smaller Turkic successor states, such as the Zengids or Artuqids, where many more illustrations are available, especially in manuscripts.

On the other hand, the affluent sedentary Persian population seems to have adopted different robe styles, with a front opening closing diagonally from left to right, called the aqbiya tatariyya or "Tatar style", but actually also characteristic of Persian caftans from the last decades of the Sasanian dynasty. The fabrics represent what could be called a "Sasanian renaissance", with styles going back to the Sasanian or Sogdian period. Seljuk fabrics are often distinguished by the representation of nature, by minimal ornamental details, and by the combination of colorful linens giving an interchangeable color effect to the fabric. Many realistic natural elements characterize the composition of the fabrics, such as animals and plants, forming patterns consisting of arabesque elements.

In many manuscripts of the period, great care is taken to distinguish the clothing of figures of power and authority in Seljuk style, from that of the otherwise omnipresent figures in Arab or local style with their long robes, turbans and bare or sandalled feet. According to Snelders:

In a number of these manuscripts, a careful distinction is made between royal and non-royal figures, both in terms of physical appearance and dress. Whereas princes and governors are commonly represented with the same "Asiatic" or "Oriental" facial features, and dressed in Turkish military garments like fur-trimmed caps (sharbush) and short close-fitting tunics, most other figures are depicted with "Arab" or "Semitic" facial features, and dressed in long robes and turbans. Apparently in keeping with the contemporary political and social makeup of the region in which these manuscripts were produced, a visual distinction was made along ethnic and social lines, between the non-Arab Turkish ruling elite and the indigenous Arab bourgeoisie.

— Bas Snelders, Identity and Christian-Muslim Interaction: Medieval Art of the Syrian Orthodox from the Mosul Area.

== Legacy ==
The dynasty brought revival, energy, and reunion to the Islamic civilization hitherto dominated by Arabs and Persians. The Seljuks founded universities and were also patrons of art and literature. Their reign is characterized by Persian astronomers such as Omar Khayyam, and the Persian philosopher al-Ghazali. Under the Seljuks, New Persian became the language for historical recording, while the center of Arabic language culture shifted from Baghdad to Cairo.

== Sultans ==
Great Seljuk Turk sultans family tree

Tuqaq Temur; Yalig Beg (b. ? – d. ?); Commander-in-chief of The Oghuz army
Seljuk Beg (b. ? – d. ?); The founder of Seljuk dynasty
Qawam al-Dawla (r. 1012–1028); Buyid Governor in Kerman	Arslan Yabgu (b. ? – d. 1032); Chief of Seljuk dynasty	Mikail ibn Seljuk (b. ? -d. ?)	The mother of Toghrul, Chaghri, Ibrahim and Artash	Yûsuf Inal	Yûnus	Mûsâ Yabgu (İnanç Yabgu) Governor of Tokharistan
Abu Kalijar (r. 1028–1048); Buyid Amir in Kirman	Kurlu Bey (r. 1069–1071); Leader of the Seljuk vassal state in Palestine	Qutalmish; Father of the founder of Anatolian Seljuk Sultanate	1.Toghrul I (r. 1037–1063); First sultan of The Great Seljuk Empire	Chaghri Beg (r. 1040–1060); Governor of Khorasan	Ibrahim Inal	Artash Inal (Artāsh)	Abu Ali; Hasan Yabgu	Yûsuf, Kara Arslan, Abu Bakr, Umar, Bori and Dawlatshah
1.Qawurd-Beg; Seljuk Shah of Kirman (r. 1048–1073); Kerman Seljuk Sultanate	Atsiz ibn Uvaq (r. 1076–1079); Amir of Dimashq	Aksungur (r. 1086–1094); Sultan of Aleppo	2.Suleiman (r. 1063); Sultan of Great Seljuk	3.Alp Arslan (r. 1063–1072); Sultan of Great Seljuk	Alp Sungur Yâkūtî; Prince; Governor of Azerbaijan	Arslan Argun and Ilyas; Other princes	Khadija Arslan; Princess married Abbasid caliph Al-Qa'im.	Safiyya Khatun; Princess
2.Kerman Shah (r. 1073–1074); 3.Hussain Omar Shah (r. 1074)	Tutush (r. 1079–1095); Sultan of Dimashq and (r. 1094–1095) of Aleppo	Turkan Khatun; The daughter of Tamghach Khan; Ibrahim of Kara-Khanid dynasty and de facto ruler of Mahmud I	4.Malik-Shah I (r. 1072–1092); Sultan of Great Seljuk	Arslan-Shah (r. 1066–1083); Governor of Khorasan	Doğan-Shah (r. 1083–1092); Governor of Khorasan	Arslan-Argun (r. 1092–1097); Governor of Khorasan	Tuğrul and Böri-Bars; Other princes	Aisha; Princess married Kara-Khanid khan Nasr Shams al-Mulk.
4.Sultan Shah (r. 1074–1085); 5.Turan I Shah (r. 1085–1097)	Dawud and Ahmad; Other princes	5.Mahmud I (r. 1092–1094); Sultan of Great Seljuk	6.Bark-Yaruq (r. 1092–1104); Sultan of Great Seljuk	8.Muhammad I Tapar (r. 1105–1118); Sultan of Great Seljuk	9.Ahmad Sanjar (r. 1118–1153); Last sultan of The Great Seljuk	Tuğrul and Amîr Humâr; Other princes	Gawhar Khatun; Princess married Ghaznavid sultan Mas'ud III.	Sayyeda; Princess married Abbasid caliph Al-Mustazhir
6.Iranshah (r. 1097–1101); 7.Arslan I Shah (r. 1101–1142)	Duqaq (r. 1095–1104); Amir of Dimashq	Mah-i Malak; Princess married Abbasid caliph Al-Muqtadi	7.Malik-Shah II (r. 1104-1105); Sultan of Great Seljuk	1.Mahmud II (r. 1118–1131); First sultan of The Iraqi Seljuks	3.Toghrul II (r. 1132–1134); Sultan of Iraqi Seljuks	Mu'mine Khatun wife of Toghrul II until 1134 wife of İldeniz from 1136	Ildeniz (r. 1160–1175) de facto ruler Atabeg of Arslan-Shah	4.Masud (r. 1134–1152); Sultan of Iraqi Seljuks
8.Malīk Muhammad I Shah (r. 1142–1156); 9.Toghrul Shah (r. 1156–1170)	Tutush II & Artash (Baktāsh) (r. 1104); Amir of Dimashq	2.Dawud (r. 1131–1132); Sultan of Iraqi Seljuks	5.Malik-Shah III (r. 1152–1153); Sultan of Iraqi Seljuks	6.Muhammad II (r. 1153–1159); Sultan of Iraqi Seljuks	7.Suleiman-Shah (r. 1159–1160); Sultan of Iraqi Seljuks	8.Arslan-Shah (r. 1160–1177); Sultan of Iraqi Seljuks	Nusrat al-Din Muhammad (r. 1175–1186) de facto ruler of Toghrul III; Atabeg of Arslan-Shah	Qizil Arslan (r. 1186-1191) de facto ruler of Toghrul III; Atabeg of the Eldiguzids
10.Bahrām, 11.Arslan II; Shah(r. 1170 - 1171); 12.Bahrām Shah (r. 1171 - 1172)	13.Bahrām & Arslan II; Shah(r. 1172–1175); 14.Bahrām Shah (r. 1175)	15.Muhammad II Shah (r. 1175); 16.Arslan II Shah (r. 1175 - 1177)	17.Turan II Shah (r. 1177–1183); 18.Muhammad II Shah (r. 1183–1187)	Fakhr al-Mulk Radwan (r. 1095–1113); Malik of Aleppo	Alp Arslan (r. 1113–1114); Sultan Shah (r. 1114–1117)	9.Toghrul III (r. 1177–1191, 1192–1194); Last sultan of The Iraqi Seljuks	Nusrat al-Din Abu Bakr (r. 1191–1210) de facto ruler Atabeg of the Eldiguzids	Muzaffar al-Din Uzbek (r. 1210–1225); Atabeg of the Eldiguzids

== See also ==
- Alexios Axouch
- Anatolian Seljuks family tree
- History of the Turks
- List of battles involving the Seljuk Empire
- Nizari–Seljuk conflicts
- Rahat al-sudur
- Timeline of the Seljuk Sultanate of Rum
- Timeline of the Turkic peoples (500–1300)
- Turkic migration

== Bibliography ==
- Biran, Michal (2005). "The Empire of the Qara Khitai in Eurasian History: Between China and the Islamic World". Cambridge University Press.
- Amir-Moezzi, Mohammad Ali (2005). "Šahrbānu". Encyclopaedia Iranica.
- Arjomand, Said Amir (1999). "The Law, Agency, and Policy in Medieval Islamic Society: Development of the Institutions of Learning from the Tenth to the Fifteenth Century". Comparative Studies in Society and History. 41 (2): 263–293. doi:10.1017/S001041759900208X. S2CID 144129603.
- Basan, Osman Aziz (2010). The Great Seljuqs - A History. Taylor & Francis.
- Beihammer, Alexander Daniel (2017). Byzantium and the Emergence of Muslim Turkish Anatolia, ca. 1040–1130. Routledge. ISBN 978-1-138-22959-4.
- Berkey, Jonathan P. (2003). The Formation of Islam: Religion and Society in the Near East, 600–1800. Cambridge University Press.
- Bloom, Jonathan M. (2001). Paper Before Print: The History and Impact of Paper in the Islamic World. Yale University Press. ISBN 0-300-08955-4.
- Bloom, Jonathan M.; Blair, Sheila S., eds. (2009s). "II. Saljuqs of Anatolia". The Grove Encyclopedia of Islamic Art and Architecture. Oxford University Pres. ISBN 978-0-19-530991-1.
- Bosworth, C.E. (1968). "The Political and Dynastic History of the Iranian World (A.D. 1000–1217)". In Boyle, J. A. (ed.). The Cambridge History of Iran. Vol. 5: The Saljuq and Mongol Periods. Cambridge University Press.
- Bosworth, C.E., ed. (2010). The History of the Seljuq Turks: The Saljuq-nama of Zahir al-Din Nishpuri. Translated by Luther, Kenneth Allin. Routledge.
- Bulliet, Richard W. (1994). Islam: The View from the Edge. Columbia University Press.
- Canby, Sheila R.; Beyazit, Deniz; Rugiadi, Martina; Peacock, A. C. S. (2016). Court and Cosmos: The Great Age of the Seljuqs. Metropolitan Museum of Art. ISBN 978-1-58839-589-4.
- Contadini, Anna (2012). "A World of Beasts: A Thirteenth-Century Illustrated Arabic Book on Animals (the Kitāb Na't al-Ḥayawān) in the Ibn Bakhtīshū' Tradition". Brill. p. 155. doi:10.1163/9789004222656_005.
- Cunliffe, Barry W. (2015). By Steppe, Desert, and Ocean: The Birth of Eurasia. Oxford University Press.
- El-Azhari, Taef (2019). "The Seljuqs from Syria to Iran: The Age of Khatuns and Atabegs". Queens, Eunuchs and Concubines in Islamic History, 661–1257. Edinburg University Press. pp. 285–348. doi:10.3366/edinburgh/9781474423182.003.0007. ISBN 978-1-4744-2318-2. S2CID 219872073.
- Ettinghausen, Richard; Grabar, Oleg; Jenkins-Madina, Marilyn (2001). Islamic Art and Architecture: 650–1250. Yale University Press. ISBN 978-0-300-08869-4.
- Frye, R. N. (1975). "The Samanids". In Frye, R. N. (ed.). The Cambridge History of Iran. Vol. 4: The Period from the Arab invasion to the Saljuqs. Cambridge University Press.
- Grousset, Rene (1988). The Empire of the Steppes. New Brunswick: Rutgers University Press. pp. 159, 161. ISBN 978-0-8135-0627-2. "In 1194, Togrul III would succumb to the onslaught of the Khwarizmian Turks, who were destined at last to succeed the Seljuks to the empire of the Middle East."
- Gardet, Louis (1970). "Religion and Culture". In Holt, P.M.; Lambton, Ann K. S.; Lewis, Bernard (eds.). The Cambridge History of Islam. Vol. 2B. Cambridge University Press. pp. 569–603.
- Herzig, Edmund; Stewart, Sarah (2014). The Age of the Seljuqs: The Idea of Iran Vol. 6. I. B. Tauris. ISBN 978-1-78076-947-9.
- Hillenbrand, Robert (1994). Islamic Architecture: Form, Function, and Meaning. Columbia University Press.
- Hillenbrand, Robert (1 January 2010). "The Schefer Ḥarīrī: A Study in Islamic Frontispiece Design". Arab Painting. pp. 117–134. doi:10.1163/9789004236615_011. ISBN 978-90-04-23661-5.
- Johanson, Lars; Johanson, Éva Ágnes Csató (2015). The Turkic Languages.
- Korobeinikov, Dimitri (2015). "The Kings of the East and the West: The Seljuk Dynastic Concept and Titles in the Muslim and Christian sources". In Peacock, A.C.S.; Yildiz, Sara Nur (eds.). The Seljuks of Anatolia. I. B. Tauris.
- Kuru, Ahmet T. (2019). Islam, Authoritarianism, and Underdevelopment: A Global and Historical Underdevelopment. Cambridge University Press.
- Lambton, A. K. S. (1968). "The Internal Structure of the Saljuq Empire". In Boyle, J. A. (ed.). The Cambridge History of Iran. Vol. 5: The Saljuq and Mongol Periods. Cambridge University Press.
- Lyons, Malcolm Cameron; Jackson, D. E. P. (1982). Saladin: The Politics of the Holy War. Cambridge University Press. ISBN 0521317398.
- Minorsky, V. (1953). Studies in Caucasian History I. New Light on the Shaddadids of Ganja II. The Shaddadids of Ani III. Prehistory of Saladin. Cambridge University Press.
- Mirbabaev, A.K. (1992). "The Islamic lands and their culture". In Bosworth, Clifford Edmund; Asimov, M. S. (eds.). History of Civilizations of Central Asia. Vol. IV: Part Two: The age of achievement: A.D. 750 to the end of the fifteenth century. Unesco.
- Christie, Niall (2014). Muslims and Crusaders - Christianity's Wars in the Middle East, 1095–1382: From the Islamic Sources. Routledge.
- Peacock, Andrew C. S. (2010). Early Seljūq History: A New Interpretation.
- Peacock, A.C.S.; Yıldız, Sara Nur, eds. (2013). The Seljuks of Anatolia: Court and Society in the Medieval Middle East. I. B. Tauris. ISBN 978-1-84885-887-9.
- Peacock, Andrew (2015). The Great Seljuk Empire. Edinburgh University Press Ltd. ISBN 978-0-7486-9807-3.
- Mecit, Songül (2014). The Rum Seljuqs: Evolution of a Dynasty. Routledge. ISBN 978-1-134-50899-0.
- Safi, Omid (2006). The Politics of Knowledge in Premodern Islam: Negotiating Ideology and Religious Inquiry (Islamic Civilization and Muslim Networks). University of North Carolina Press.
- Schnyder, R. (1973). "Political Centres and Artistic Powers in Saljuq". In Richards, D.S. (ed.). Papers on Islamic History. Vol. III. Cassirer. pp. 201–210.
- El-Azhari, Taef (2021). Queens, Eunuchs and Concubines in Islamic History, 661–1257. Edinburgh University Press. ISBN 978-1-4744-2318-2.
- Green, Nile (2019). Green, Nile (ed.). The Persianate World: The Frontiers of a Eurasian Lingua Franca. University of California Press.
- Snelders, Bas (2010). Identity and Christian-Muslim Interaction: Medieval Art of the Syrian Orthodox from the Mosul Area. Peeters. pp. Online extract with unnumbered pages. ISBN 978-90-429-2386-7.
- Spuler, Bertold (2014). Iran in the Early Islamic Period: Politics, Culture, Administration and Public Life between the Arab and the Seljuk Conquests, 633–1055. Brill. ISBN 978-90-04-28209-4.
- Stokes, Jamie, ed. (2008). Encyclopedia of the Peoples of Africa and the Middle East. New York: Facts On File. ISBN 978-0-8160-7158-6. Archived from the original on 2017-02-14.
- Tor, D.G. (2011). ""Sovereign and Pious": The Religious Life of the Great Seljuq Sultans". In Lange, Christian; Mecit, Songul (eds.). The Seljuqs: Politics, Society, and Culture. Edinburgh University Press. pp. 39–62.
- Tor, Deborah (2012). "The Long Shadow of Pre-Islamic Iranian Rulership: Antagonism or Assimilation?". In Bernheimer, Teresa; Silverstein, Adam J. (eds.). Late Antiquity: Eastern Perspectives. Oxbow. pp. 145–163. ISBN 978-0-906094-53-2.
- Van Renterghem, Vanessa (2015). "Baghdad: A View from the Edge on the Seljuk Empire". In Herzig, Edmund; Stewart, Sarah (eds.). The Age of the Seljuqs: The Idea of Iran. Vol. VI. I. B. Tauris.
