= List of Seljuk rulers of Kerman (1041–1187) =

Kerman is a province in southeast Persia.

== List of Seljuk rulers of Kerman Seljuk Sultanate ==
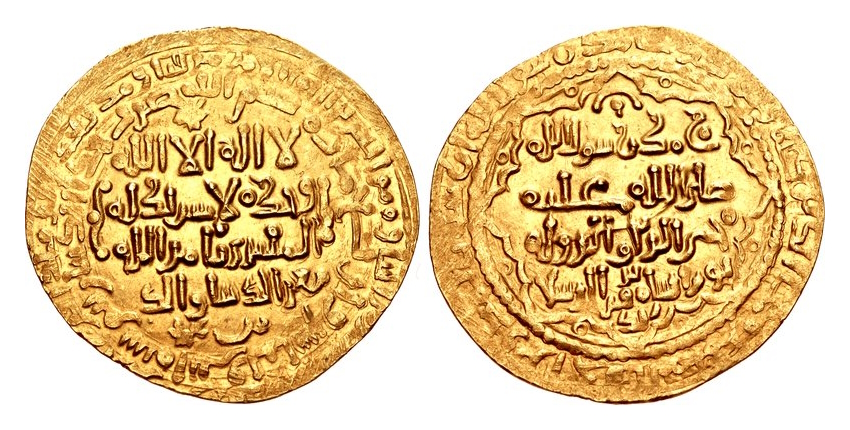
Coinage of Turan Shah I (1084-1096). AV Dinar (27mm, 3.48 g, 6h). Bamm mint. Dated AH 483 (AD 1090-1)

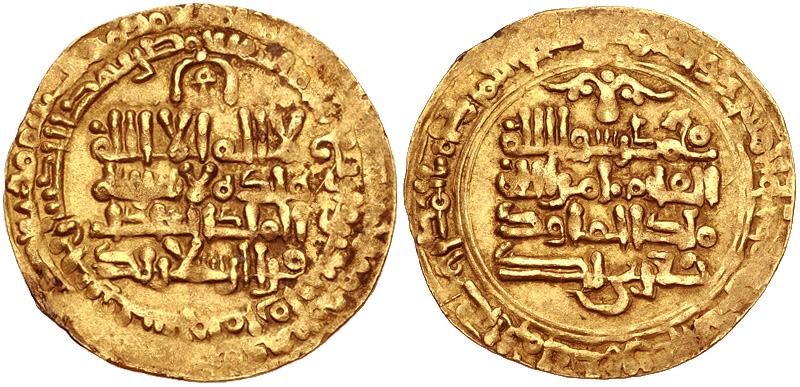
Gold dinar under Qavurt, citing Chaghri Beg as his overlord. Minted in Jiroft, dated 1056/7

- Qawurd of Kerman (1041-1073)
- Kerman Shah (1073-1074)
- Sultan Shah (1074-1075)
- Hussain Omar (1075-1084)
- Turan Shah I (1084-1096)
- Iranshah ibn Turanshah (1096-1101)
- Arslan Shah I (1101-1142)
- Mehmed I (Muhammad) (1142-1156)
- Tuğrul Shah (1156-1169)
- Bahram-Shah (1169-1174)
- Arslan Shah II (1174-1176)
- Turan Shah II (1176-1183)
- Mehmed II (1183-1187)

Mehmed II overthrown by the Oghuz chief Malik Dinar
