= Turanshah (disambiguation) =

Turanshah may refer to:

- Shams ad-Din Turanshah (d. 1180), brother of Saladin, ruler of Yemen, Baalbek and Damascus
- Al-Mu'azzam Turanshah ibn Salah al-Din (d. 1260), son of Saladin
- Al-Mu'azzam Turanshah, son of as-Salih Ayyub and ruler of Egypt (1249–50), anti-7th Crusade
- Turan Shahr, village in Iran
- Turan Shah I, shah of the Kerman Seljuk Sultanate.
- Turan Shah II, shah of the Kerman Seljuk Sultanate.
