= Qavurt =

Seljuk Şehzade and Shah of Kerman (died 1073)

- Shah; Bey; Melik; Şehzade
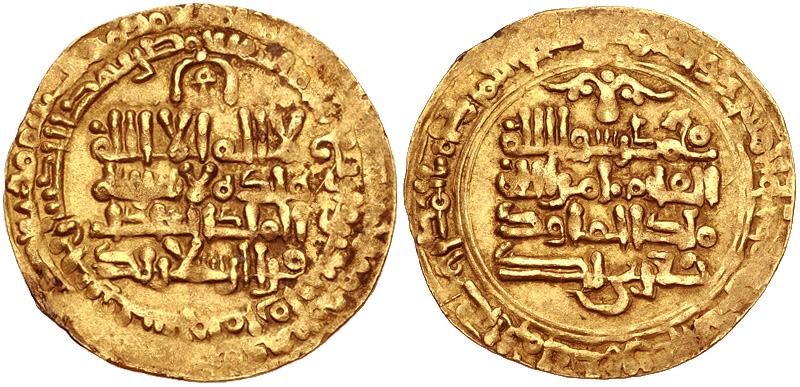
- Gold dinar under Qavurt, citing Chaghri Beg as his overlord. Minted in Jiroft, dated 1056/7

Shah of Kerman
- Reign: 1041 – 1073
- Predecessor: Position Established; Abu Kalijar (as Buyid Emir of Kerman)
- Successor: Kerman Shah
- Born: 11th Century (Note: Exact dates are unknown.)
- Died: 1073; Hamadan, Great Seljuk Empire
- Cause of death: Execution
- Children: Turan Shah I; Kerman Shah; Sultan-Shah; Amirān-Shah; Umar-Shah; Mardan-Shah; Mustazhiriyya
Names
- Kara Arslan Ahmad Qavurt bin Dawud Chaghri; Imad-al-Din Qavurt Bey
- Dynasty: Seljuk Dynasty
- Father: Dawud Chaghri Beg
- Religion: Sunni Islam
- Military career
- Service years: c. 1040s – 1073
- Conflicts: Conquest of Kerman; Conflict with Fadluya; Qavurt's First Rebellion; Qavurt's Second Rebellion; Conquest of Oman; Battle of Rey (1059); Qavurt's Third Rebellion

Kara Arslan Ahmad Qavurt (died 1073), better simply known as Qavurt (also spelled Kavurt) was a Seljuq Prince and the first shah of the Kerman Seljuk Sultanate. Upon his brother's death, he led an unsuccessful rebellion against his nephew in an attempt to gain the Seljuk throne.

== Background ==
The Seljuq dynasty was a Turkic Sunni Muslim dynasty that established both the Seljuq Empire and Sultanate of Rum, which at their total height stretched from Anatolia through Persia. Qavurt was the son of Çağrı Bey, who was the grandson of Seljuk, the founder of the dynasty. Qavurt's brother Alp Arslan succeeded his uncle Tuğrul as the new sultan and Qavurt then the governor of Kirman (south Persia) waited for his turn.

== Establishment of the Sultanate ==
After the death of 'Adud al-Dawla on 26 March 983, the Buyid dynasty rapidly weakened due to succession conflicts and external threats. The Buyid dynasty, which had weakned by the reign of Abu Kalijar, was losing territories and was unable to maintain its suzerainty in occupied regions. Following the conquest of Khorasan and the establishment of the Great Seljuk state, Toghrul Bey, the Sultan of the Great Seljuk state, assigned the division of conquered territories among his brothers and nephews and delegated to them the task of conquering new regions. His primary goals were, first, to consolidate his authority over the territories he had already brought under his control, and second, to rapidly expand Seljuk power by subjugating additional regions. Thus, the empire was divided into provinces, and each trusted relative was not only assigned a province to govern but also tasked with the conquest of neighboring lands. Chaghri Beg, as the eldest brother, made Merv and Khorasan his base; and Musa Yabugu was appointed over Bust, Herat, and Sistan.

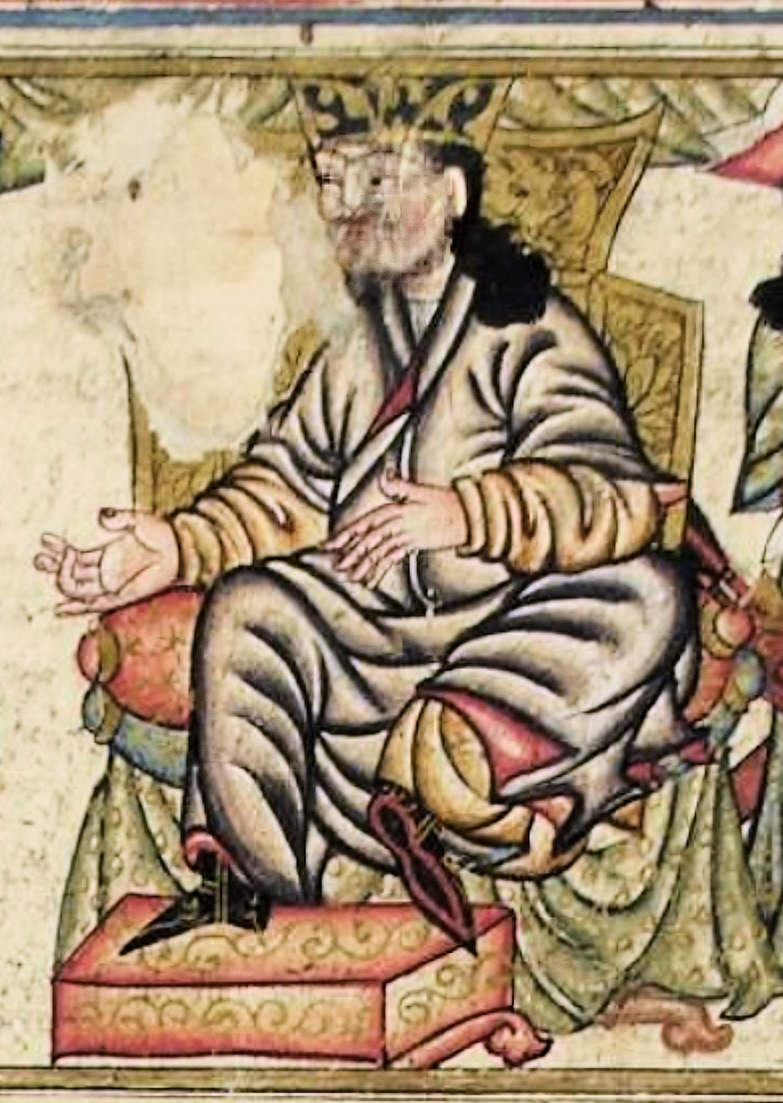
Seljuk Sultan Tugrul Bey enthroned. Topkapı Sarayı Müzesi 1653-3 (304 B)

=== Conquest of Kerman ===
Qavurt, the son of Chaghri Beg, chose Kuhistan and Kerman. Qavurt, on the orders of Sultan Tuğrul Bey, moved to this region with the Oghuz Turks under his command. Though, he defeated the Buyid ruler’s army in Kerman and Makran in around 1041 CE and brought Kerman under his control, some of his attacks were repelled by Kalijar around 1042. A few years later, Qavurt, personally leading an army of 5,000-6,000 men, moved towards Northern Kerman. Realizing he could not resist the Seljuk forces, the Buyid governor, Bahram b. Lashkaristan, retreated to Bardasir. He gradually surrendered the city to Qavurt, seeking protection in 1048. There, he laid the foundations of his own new sultanate in around 1048 CE and became its de facto ruler as a subject of Tughril I. When Abu Kalijar set out to drive the Seljuks out of the region, he died at the Hannab Fortress on the way, and the Buyid forces retreated.

The southern part of Kerman, called Germsir, was under the control of a bandit tribe called the Kufs. Qavurt Bey suppressed the Kufs in the mountains east of Kerman, destroying most of them, subsequently capturing Southern Kerman. Following this success, Badr Isa, the emir of Hormuz, submitted to the Seljuk Sultanate of Kerman.

== Early Campaigns ==
=== Battle of Rey (1059) ===
As a result of a rebellion by Ibrahim Yinal, the Seljuk Sultan Tughril I, who was in a difficult situation, asked for help from his brother Chaghri. Chaghri responded to this request for help by sending an army under the command of his sons Alp Arslan, Qavurt, and Yakuti. The army under the command of Ibrahim Yinal and his nephews Mehmed and Ahmed, and the army under the command of Alp Arslan, Qavurt, and Yakuti encountered each other near Rey. Ibrahim Yinal and his nephews, who lost the battle, were taken prisoner.

=== First Conflict with Fadluya (1062) ===
Qavurt, then the governor of Kerman, had invaded Fars in 1062 and brought it under his control, handed over to him by Turkish soldiers and the Deylemis. He also conquered Shiraz, after it had been abandoned by Fadluya, the emir of Shabankara, who took refuge in Jahrom After defeating Fadlya, Qavurt Bey returned to Shiraz, had the Friday sermon read in the name of his uncle Tugrul Bey, and sent him gifts. The following year, Qavurt, along with 4,000 Turkish soldiers, confronted Fadluya, who was marching on Shiraz at the head of 20,000 Deylemis, and defeated him again, taking many prisoners.

=== Second Conflict with Fadluya (1064-1065) ===
Seeking support, Fadluya turned to Qavurt's brother Alp Arslan, offering an annual tribute of 27 million dirhams in return for the Seljuks letting him remain ruler of Fars. Alp Arslan, following his campaign in the northwest, launched an expedition against Qavurt. During an attack by Alp Arslan's army, Qavurt's soldiers were defeated and pleaded for mercy. Qavurt fled and his loyalists were imprisoned. Thereafter, Alp Arslan appointed Fadluya as governor of Fars and went to Isfahan. Hence, Qavurt lost all his territories that he controlled in Fars.

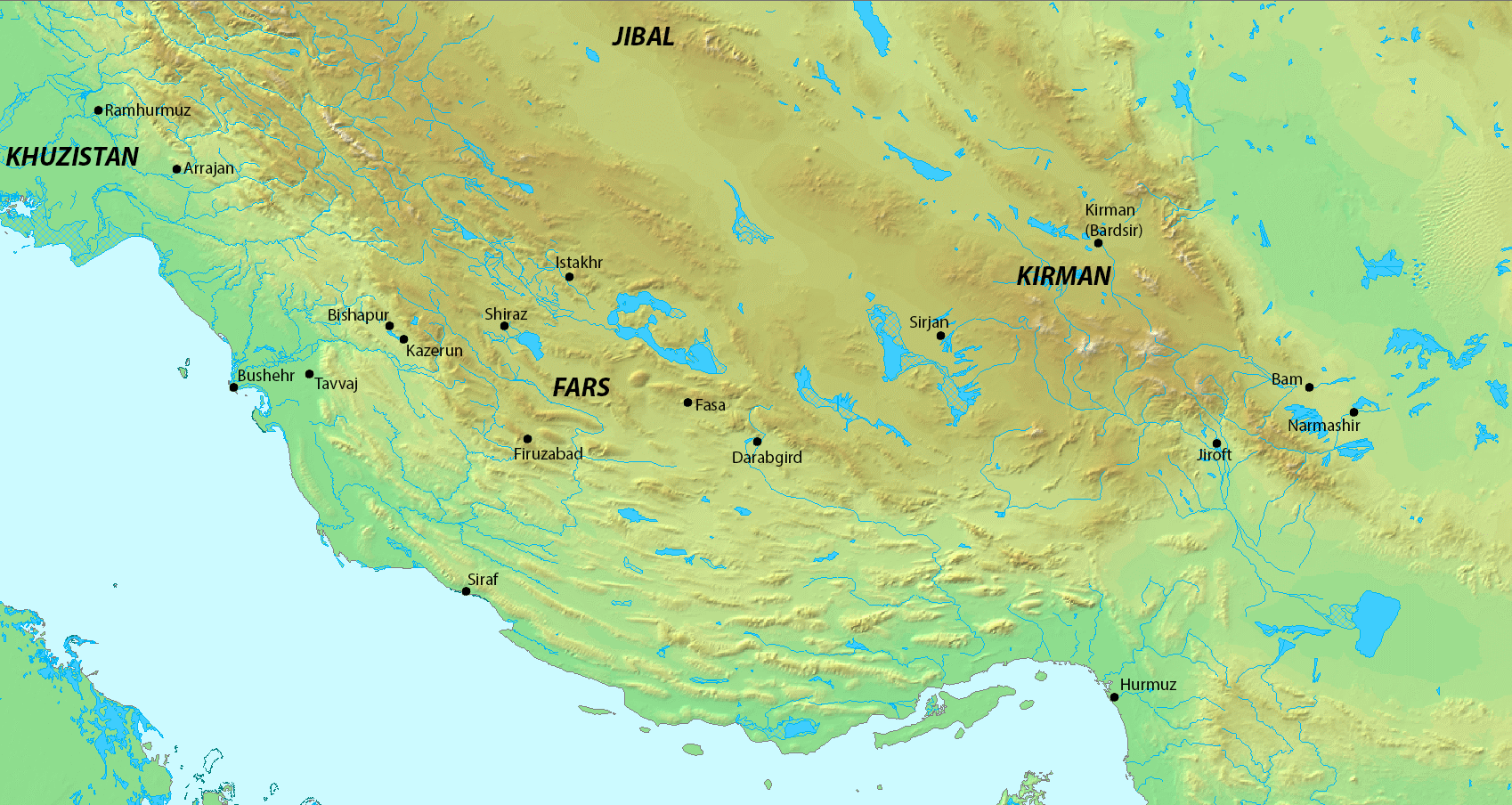
Map of Fars

Later, in the reign of sultan Alp Arslan, Fadluya rebelled against him. He stopped sending the annual tribute, proclaimed himself an independent ruler, and took up a defensive position at the fortress of Khvorsha near Jahrom. However, this rebellion was unsuccessful as Alp Arslan's vizier Nizam al-Mulk came and ended up capturing the fortress after 16 days. Fadluya surrendered and offered to pay reparations. He was forgiven and allowed to resume his position as ruler of Fars.

=== Qavurt's First Rebellion ===
When Alp Arslan succeeded Tugrul Bey in Rey (1063) as the Great Seljuk Sultan, Qavurt Bey had the khutbah (sermon) read in Alp Arslan's name in Kerman and demanded a share of the treasury and possessions inherited from his uncle. Evoked by these provocations, Qavurt Bey incited a brief rebellion against Alp Arslan in 1067 by removing his brother's name from the khutba and minting coins in his own name. Thereafter, the Great Seljuk Sultan went on an expedition against him. Qavurt, seized with fear, fled to the city of Jiroft and begged for forgiveness after the army he sent was defeated by Alp Arslan's vanguard. Alp Arslan then proceeded to besiege Jiroft, but thereafter pardoned him and left him as the governor of Kerman.

=== Qavurt's Second Rebellion ===
Qavurt later rebelled again, allying himself with Fadluya, the Shabankara chief, claiming the throne in around 1068-69. Sultan Alp Arslan mobilized his army as soon as he received news of the uprisings. Qavurt was located in the fortified castle of Bardasir at this time. Sultan Alp Arslan entered Kerman territory and advanced to Bardasir. He laid siege to the fortress upon arriving before the city. Qavurt begged the Sultan for a pardon upon hearing that Fadluya had been forgiven. His real goal however was merely to buy time. Qavurt was planning to launch a surprise attack by conspiring with a faction within Sultan Alp Arslan's army. Sultan Alp Arslan had the collaborators executed after becoming aware of this plot. He besieged Bardasir for a while longer before handing over the command of the siege to his son Malik-Shah and departing for Isfahan. Sultan Alp Arslan then demanded the surrender of the Sultan-Shah who had originally caused Qavurt to rebel. Qavurt rejected this demand. Sultan Alp Arslan thereupon confiscated a certain portion of the territories that were under Qavurt's sovereignty.

Fadluya was also active around Fars, collaborating with Qavurt during the rebellion.Alp Arslan first marched against Fadluya. He later marched against Qavurt after assigning Nizam al-Mulk the task of capturing Fadluya who had taken refuge in the fortress of Kurşeh. Nizam al-Mulk's attempt to resolve things peacefully failed; and again Fadluya ended up ensconcing himself in Kurşeh. Nizam al-Mulk laid siege to the fortress which surrendered after a relatively short time due to lack of water.Hence, Nizam al-Mulk captured Fadluya while the siege of Bardasir was ongoing. Fadluya attempted to flee but was captured and brought before Alp Arslan. The captive Fadluya was pardoned by Sultan Alp Arslan. Nizam al-Mulk captured several fortresses, including Estakhr, from Fadluya, where he was imprisoned. He possibly died in an attempt to flee or in another campaign by Nizam, while being held captive with his son, Hasan or Hasanuya.

=== Expansion of the sultanate ===
Qavurt's success in taking over Kerman early in Tughril's reign had attracted thither larger numbers of Türk-men, which greatly disturbed the stability of the sultanate. Qavurt's policy had therefore been to divert them into those outlying parts that were infested with Balūchi brigands, and he also sent a force under his son Amirān-Shah against Sistān. As a further outlet for expansion and settlement, he mounted an expedition against Oman, and after crossing the Persian Gulf in ships chartered from the local ruler of Hurmuz, he deposed the Büyid governor and brought Oman under Seljuk suzerainty.

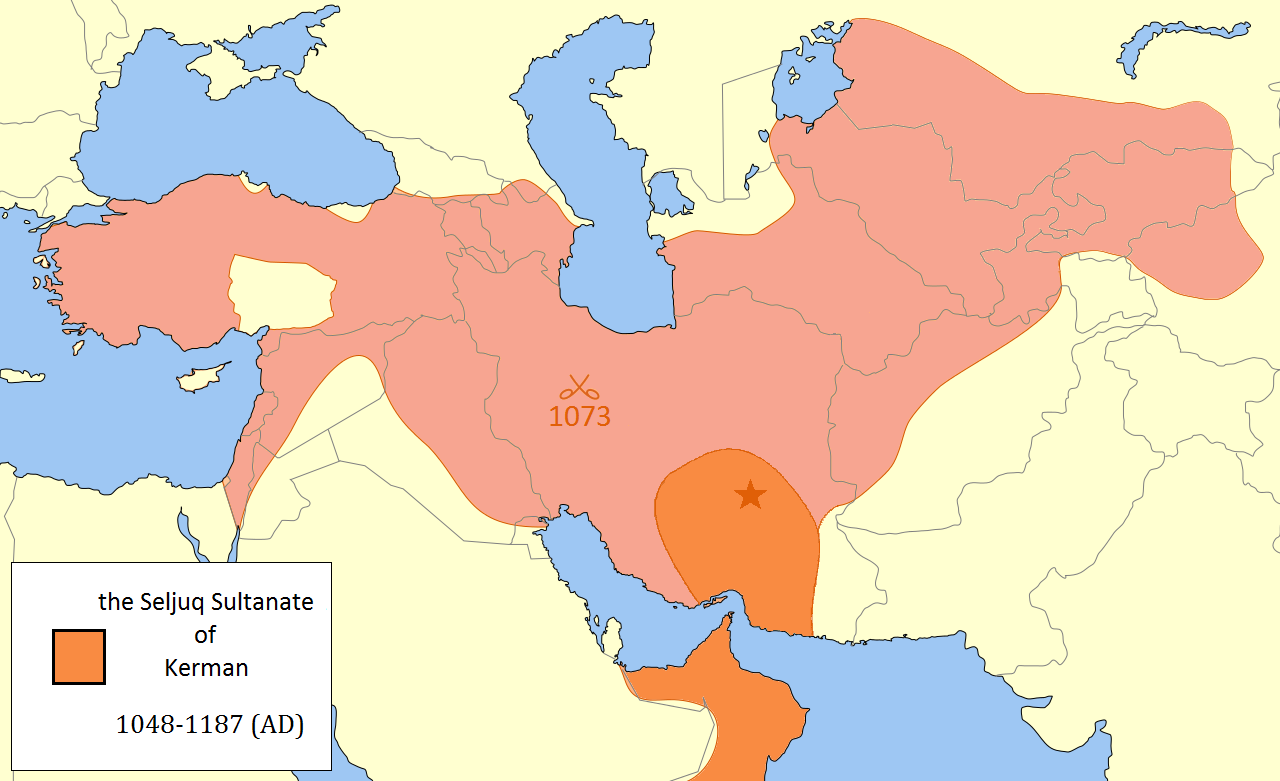
The Kerman Seljuk Sultanate at its zenith after Qavurt's expansion

However, upon hearing the news of Malik-Shah's accession, Qavurt hurried back to Kerman from Oman, losing several ships and many men in the crossing. He then proceeded to incite a rebellion against Malik Shah, which proved to be his last campaign.

== Qavurt's rebellion ==
=== Alp Arslan's will ===
Alp Arslan died in 1072. But before death he willed his throne to Malik Shah I, his second son. He also expressed his concern about possible throne struggles. The major contestants for the throne were his eldest son Ayaz and his brother Qavurt. As a compromise, he willed generous grants to Ayaz and Qavurt. On his deathbed, Sultan Alp Arslan, with Nizam al-Mulk as his testifier, bequeathed Fars to Qavurt, a share of the treasury to him, and the marriage of his chief consort, Seferiye Hatun, to him.

=== Qavurt's Third Rebellion ===
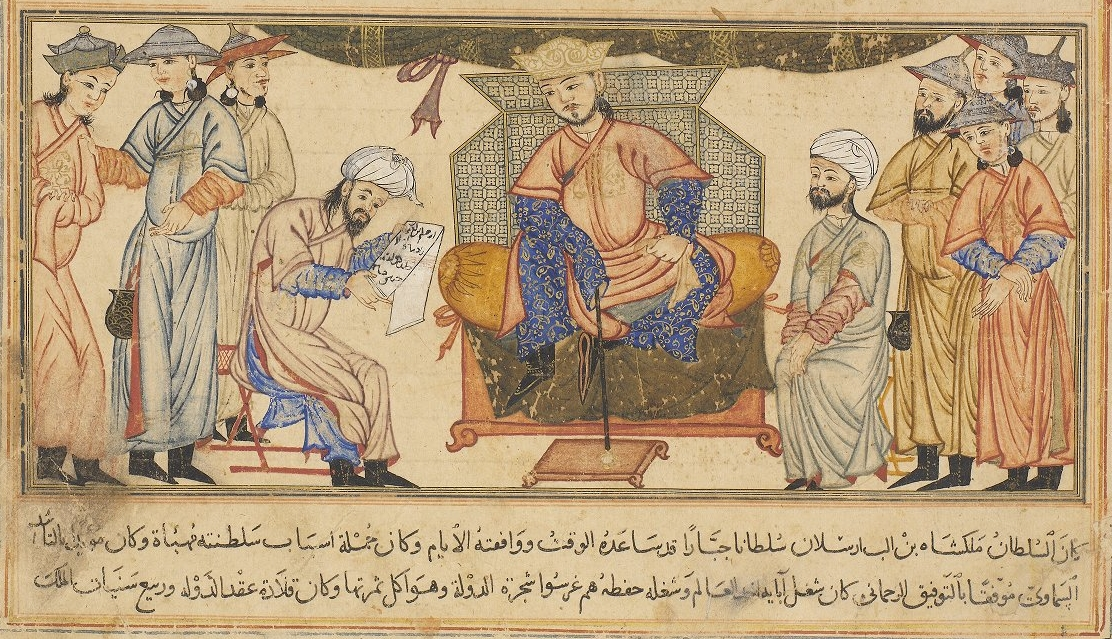
Malik Shah enthroned after the battle

Malik Shah was only 17 or 18 years of age when he ascended to throne. Although Ayaz presented no problem, he faced with the serious problem of Qavurt's rebellion. His vizier Nizam al-Mulk was even more worried for he had become the de facto ruler of the empire during young Malik Shah's reign. Although Qavurt had only a small army, Turkmen officiers in Malik Shah's army tended to support Qavurt. So Malik Shah and Nizam al-Mulk added non Turkic regiments to Seljuk army. Artukids also supported Malik Shah. The clash was at a location known as Kerç kapı (or Kerec ) close to Hamedan on 16 May 1073. Malik Shah was able to defeat Qavurt's forces. Although Qavurt escaped, he was soon arrested. Initially Malik Shah was tolerant to his uncle. But Nizam al-Mulk convinced the young sultan to execute Qavurt. Nizam al-Mulk also executed two of Qavurt's four sons. Later he eliminated most of the Turkic commanders of the army whom he suspected to be Qavurt's partisans.

=== Aftermath ===
Qavurt's defeat was a blow to Turkic character of the empire. But Qavurt's other sons managed to rule in Kirman as vassals of Malik Shah and their small state lived even longer than that of the Great Seljuk Empire.

== Family ==
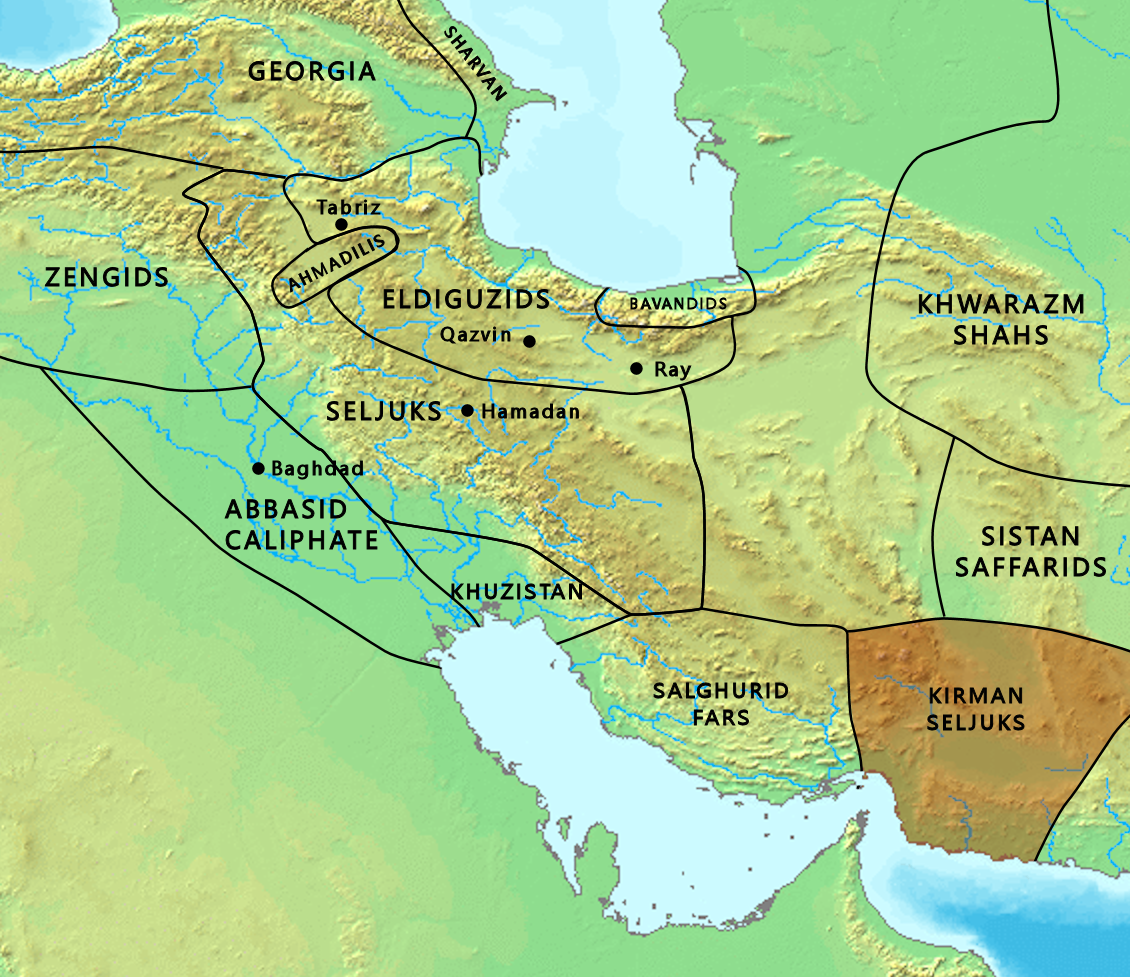
Map of the Kerman Seljuk Sultanate in 1180 CE

Qavurt was the son of Dawud Chaghri Bey, the Seljuk governor of Khorasan and the brother of Toghrul Bey, then the Sultan of the Great Seljuk Empire. His principle brothers include the later Seljuk Sultan Alp Arslan, Suleiman ibn Chaghri and Alp Sungur Yaquti. Qavurt also fathered many sons, among which include Kerman-Shah, Sultan-Shah, Amirān-Shah, Turan Shah I, Husayn, and Mardan Shah. According to the chronicler Afdal al-Din Abu Hamid Kirmani, Qavurt’s descendants maintained control over the Kerman Seljuk Sultanate for over a century following his death, despite the conflict with the Great Seljuk central authority.

Qavurt's sister Khadija Arslan Khatun was married to the Abbasid Caliph Al-Qaim in 1056 AD, which strengthened the ties between the Seljuks and the Abbasids.

Qavurt also had a daughter named Mustazhiriyya who was married to Sultan Ghiyath ad-Din Mas'ud in May–June 1138.

Family tree of the Shahs of Kerman

Duqaq Temur Beg
Seljuk Bey
Mikail Yabughu	Arslan Yabughu	Musa Yabghu	Yunus	Yusuf
Dawud Chaghri Bey	Tughril Bey; Sultan
Alp Arslan; Sultan	Qavurt; Shah of Kerman	Sulayman ibn Chaghri	Yaquti ibn Chaghri
Kerman Shah; Shah of Kerman	Sultan Shah; Shah of Kerman	Turan Shah I Shah of Kerman	Amirān-Shah	Mustazhiriyya; Daughter of Qavurt	Hüseyin Shah	Mardan Shah	Ömer Shah	Nuh	Dawud
Hussein Omar Shah; Shah of Kerman	Arslan Shah I Shah of Kerman	Iran Shah; Shah of Kerman	Son of Ghiyath ad-Din Mas'ud
Toghrul Shah	Muhammad I ibn Arslan; Shah of Kerman	Kerman Shah	Saljuk Shah
Toğrul Shah; Shah of Kerman	Mahd Rafi Khatun (Note: Spouse of Muhammad II ibn Mahmud)
Bahram Shah; Shah of Kerman	Arslan Shah II; Shah of Kerman	Turan Shah II; Shah of Kerman	Terken Shah
Muhammad-Shah II; Shah of Kerman	Yawlak ibn Arslan; Shah of Kerman

== In popular fiction ==
- In the series, Alparslan: Büyük Selçuklu, Qavurt Bey has been portrayed as a turbulent element during Alp Arslan's reign by Kaan Yalçin.
