= Malek Mosque =

Mosque in Kerman, Iran

Malek Mosque (Imam Mosque of Kerman)
- مسجد ملک کرمان
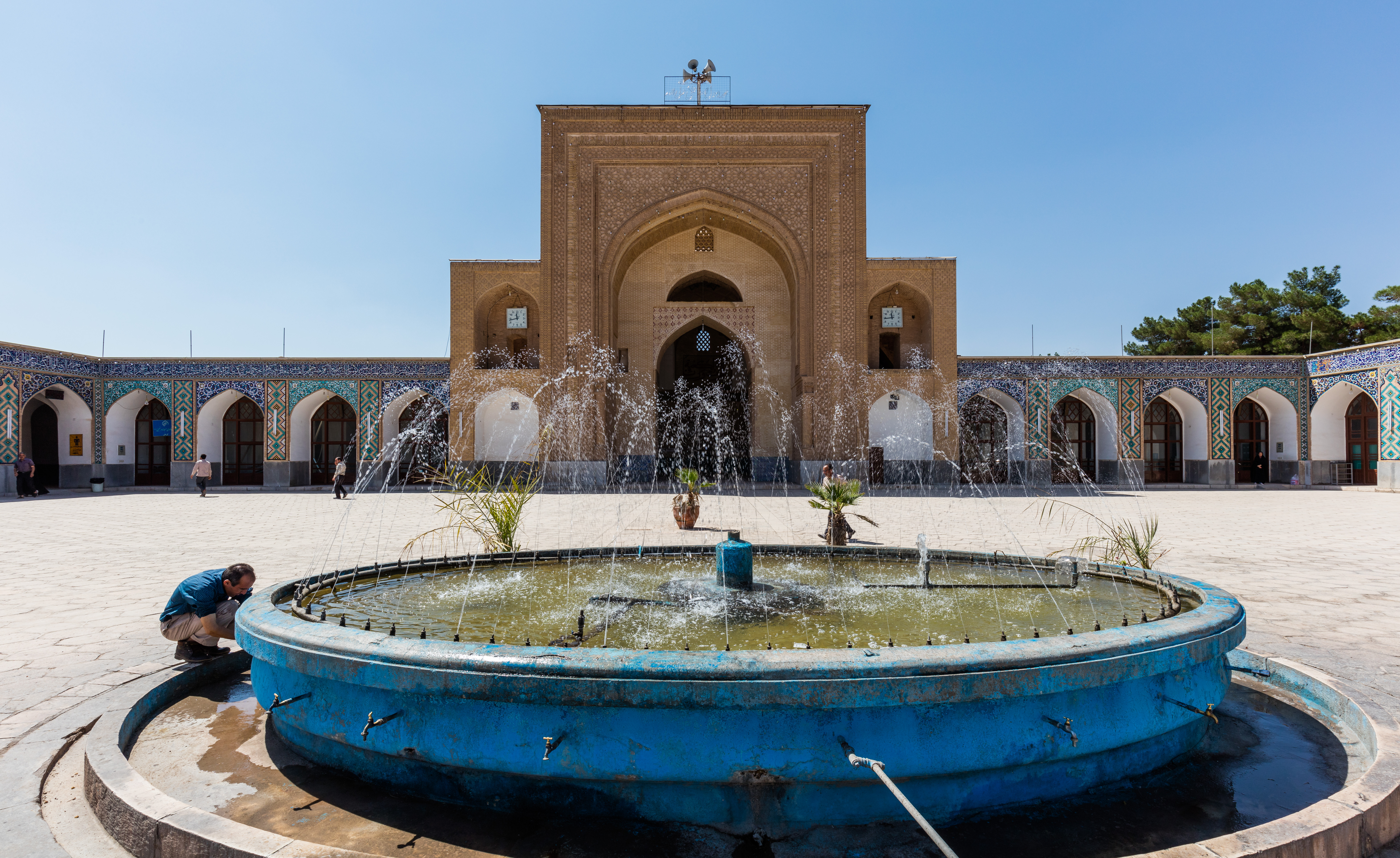

- Location of the mosque in Iran

Religion
- Affiliation: Shia Islam
- Ecclesiastical or organisational status: Mosque
- Status: Active

Location
- Location: Kerman, Kerman Province
- Country: Iran
- Coordinates: 30°17′16″N 57°4′54″E

Architecture
- Type: Mosque architecture
- Style: Seljuk
- Funded by: Turan Shah I
- Completed: c. 1096 CE

Specifications
- Length: 101 m (331 ft)
- Width: 91 m (299 ft)
- Dome: One (maybe more)
- Minarets: One (squat and rounded)
- Materials: Terracotta; bricks; stucco

Iran National Heritage List
- Official name: Malek Mosque
- Type: Built
- Designated: 7 October 1967
- Reference no.: 760
- Conservation organization: Cultural Heritage, Handicrafts and Tourism Organization of Iran

The Malek Mosque (Persian: مسجد ملک کرمان, romanized: Masjid-e Malik; Arabic: مسجد ملك), also called the Imam Mosque (transl. Masjid-i imam), is a Shi'ite mosque located in Kerman, Iran. The mosque was built at the time of Turan Shah I, Kerman Seljuk Sultanate, between 1077 and 1096 CE, and is the biggest and oldest mosque in Kerman.

The mosque was added to the Iran National Heritage List on 7 October 1967, administered by the Cultural Heritage, Handicrafts and Tourism Organization of Iran.

== Architecture ==
The building has four portals. The dome at the front of the structure, the iwan behind it, and the minaret in the northeast corner are attributed to the Seljuk period. The building has been restored many times since its construction in the early part of the 11th century.

There is a large sahn in the middle of the complex, containing a small pool. There are slight differences to each iwan: the iwan in the west is not as deep as others, while others are wider. Each iwan is covered by ogee vaults, surrounded by between one and four naves, including the mihrab side. The façade and interior design of the iwan in front of the mihrab significantly differ from the other iwans.

The dome sits on the mihrab wall and three arches placed between two rows of rectangular pillars created by two square pillars. These are connected to each other by two small arches on the sides. Some depth was given to the mihrab by creating a corridor in front of the mihrab wall, where the mihrab wall is located. Although the building's dome in front of the mihrab is small, it is interesting in terms of its height. Transition elements in the corners of the dome are pendentive arches. The faces of the arches of the arcades and portals are decorated with glazed bricks, added at a later period.

Terracotta and stucco decorations were found during 20th-century repairs, that comprise curved branches and compositions consisting of Kufic inscription bands.

== Gallery ==
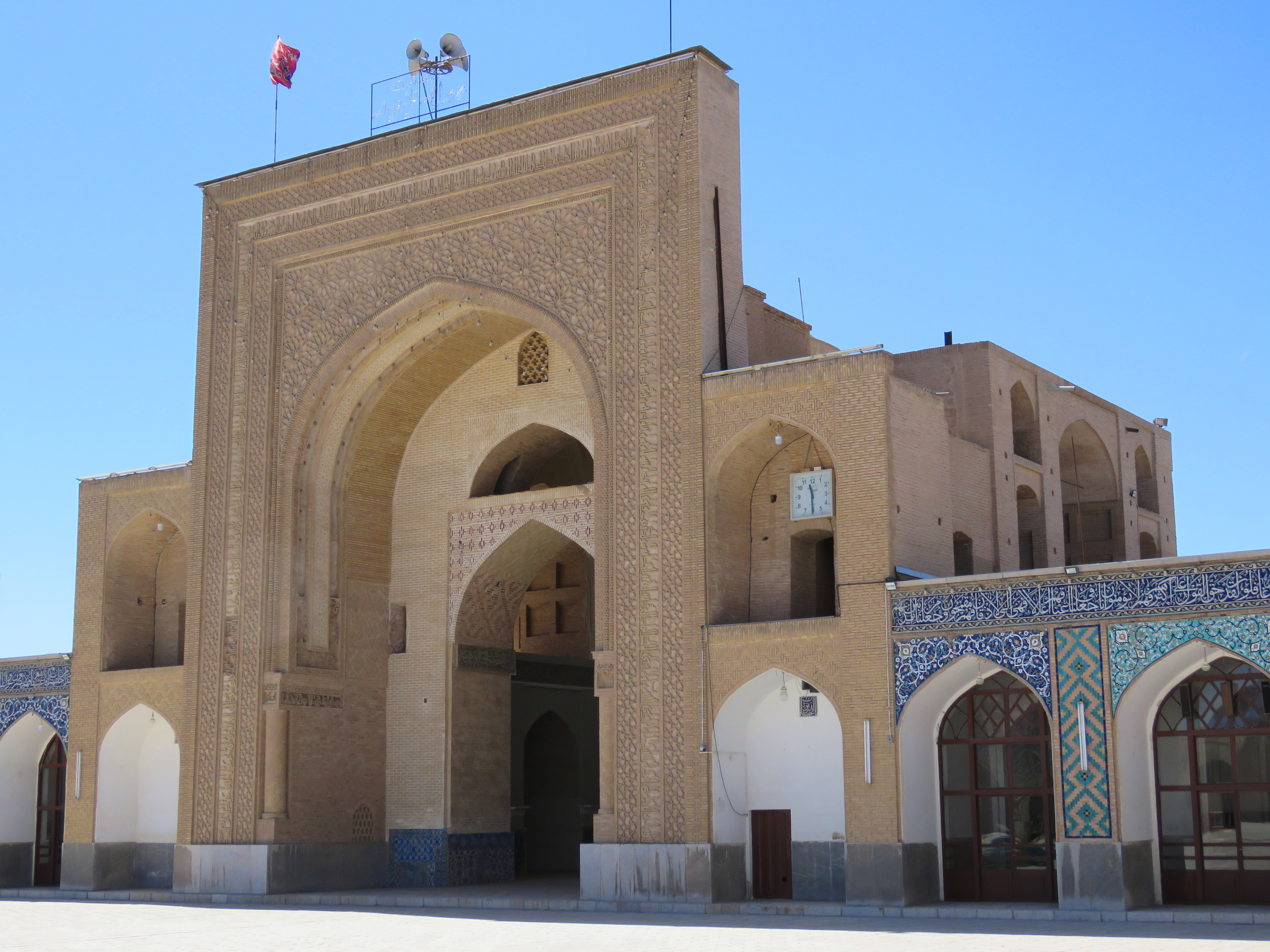
The main iwan from the courtyard

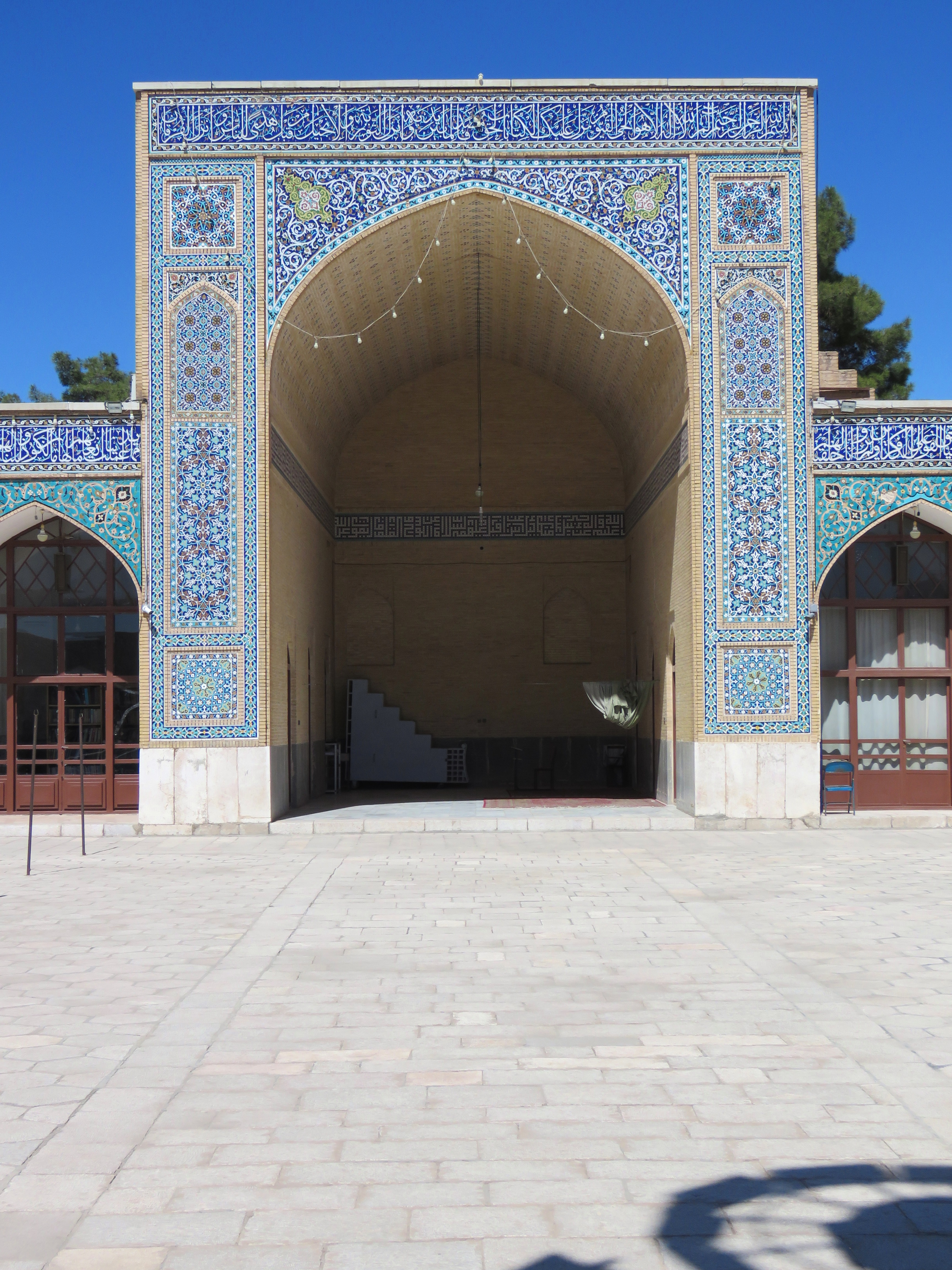
One of the side iwans

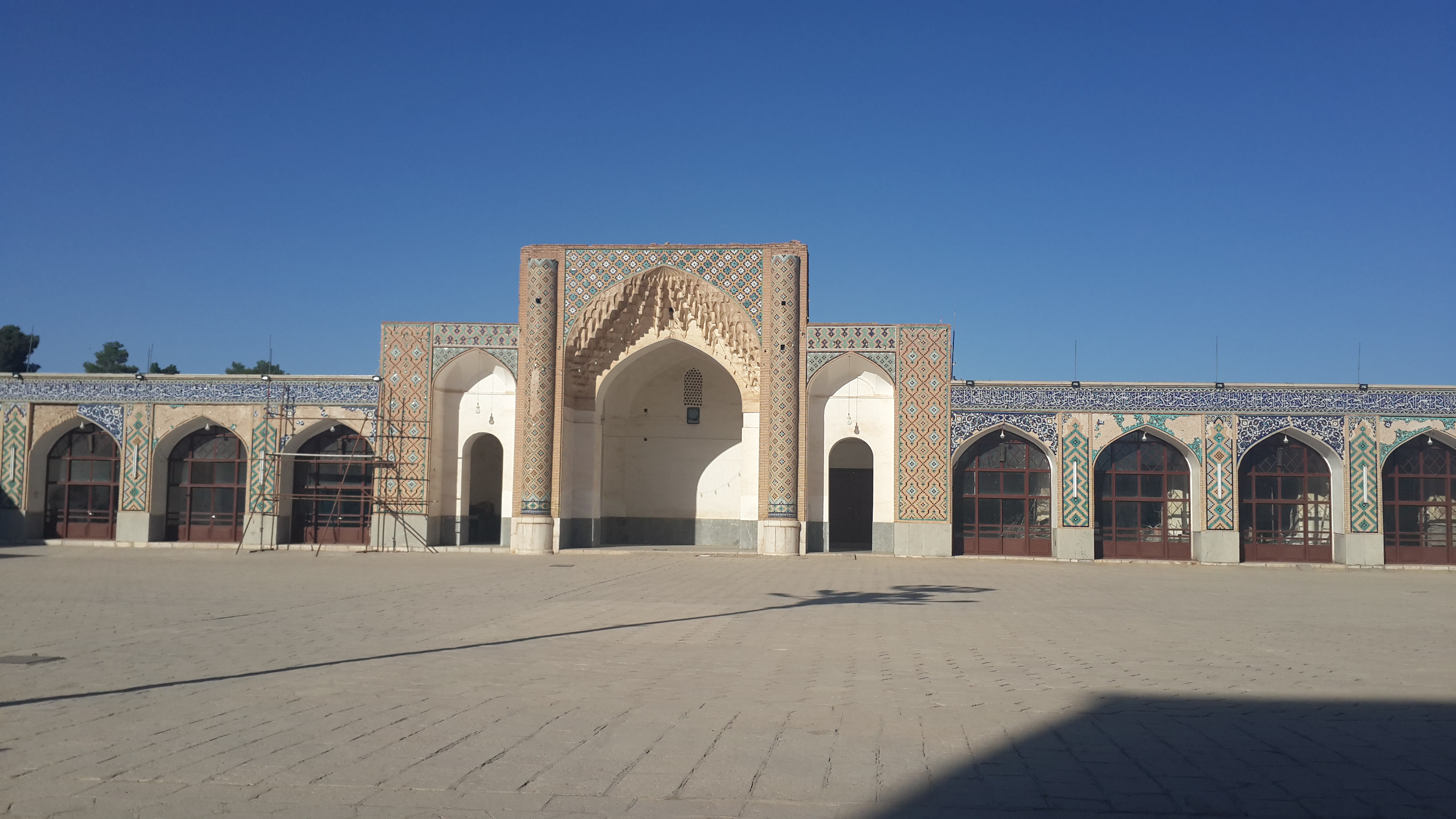
The eastern iwan

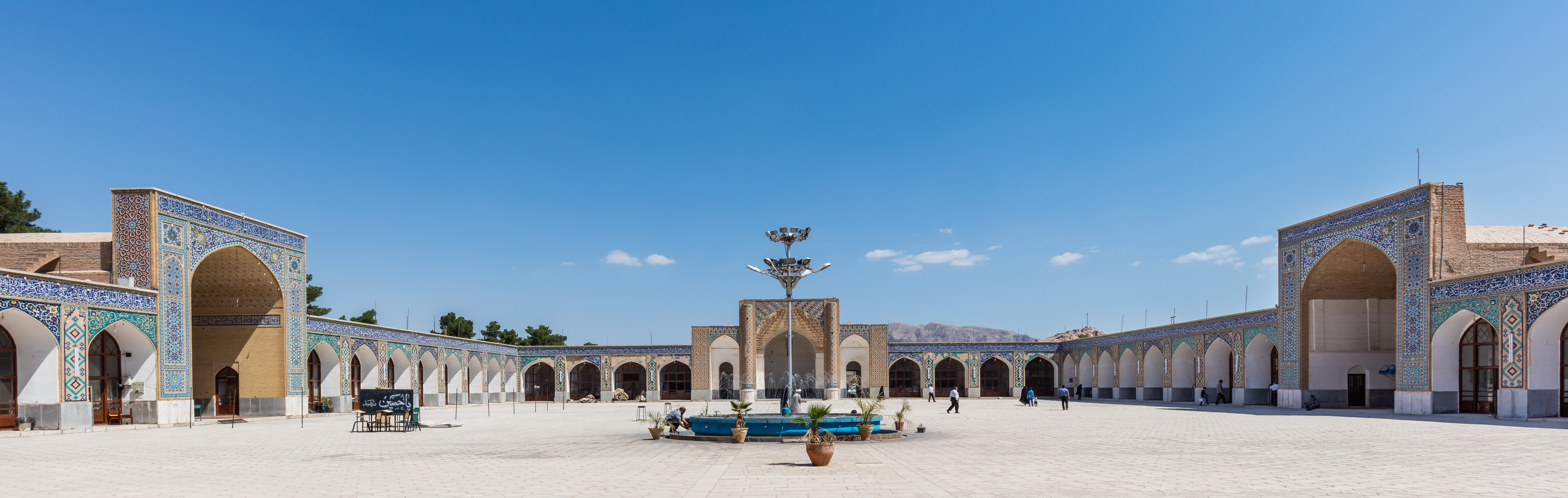
The sahn with its fountain looking east

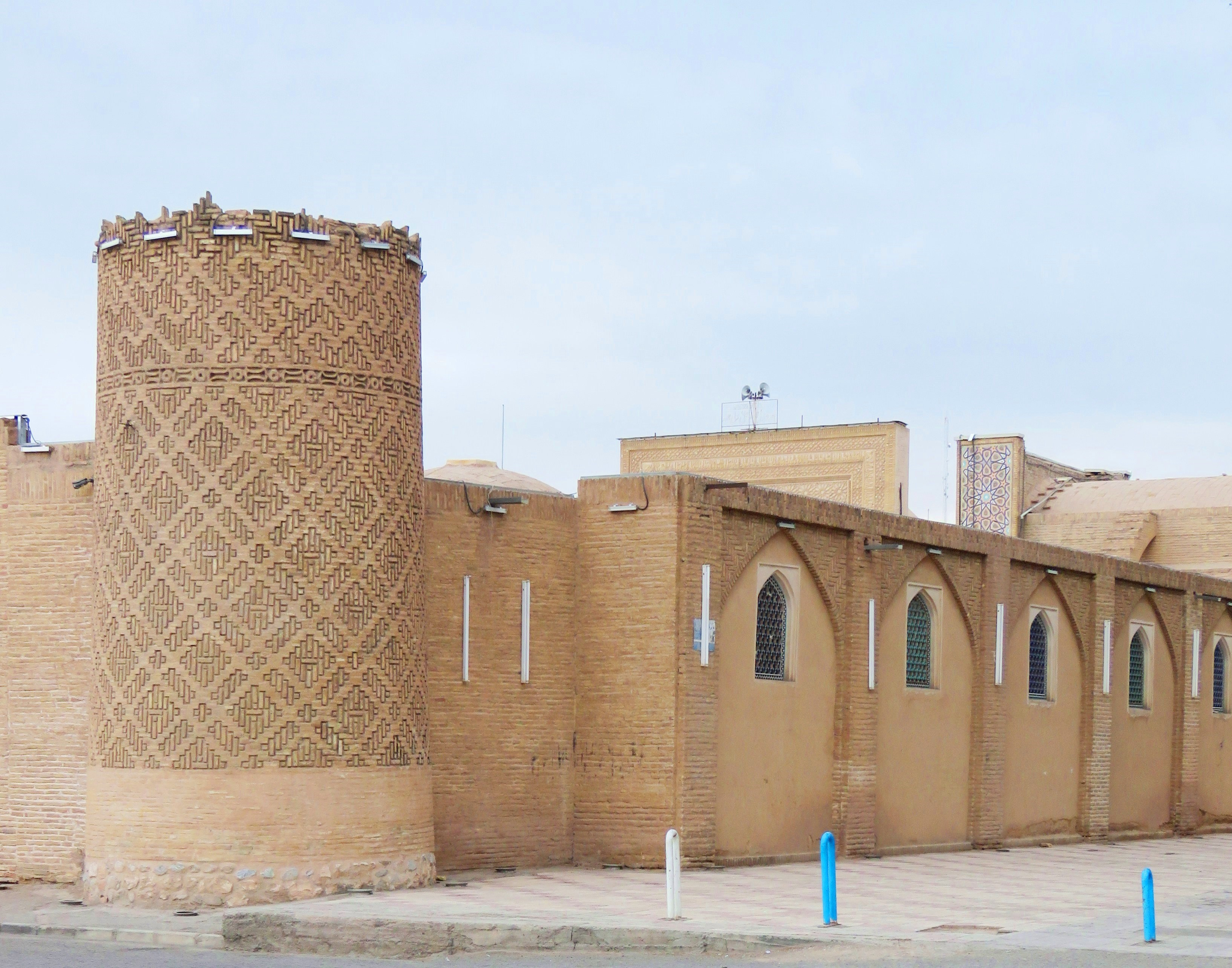
Squat minaret of the mosque

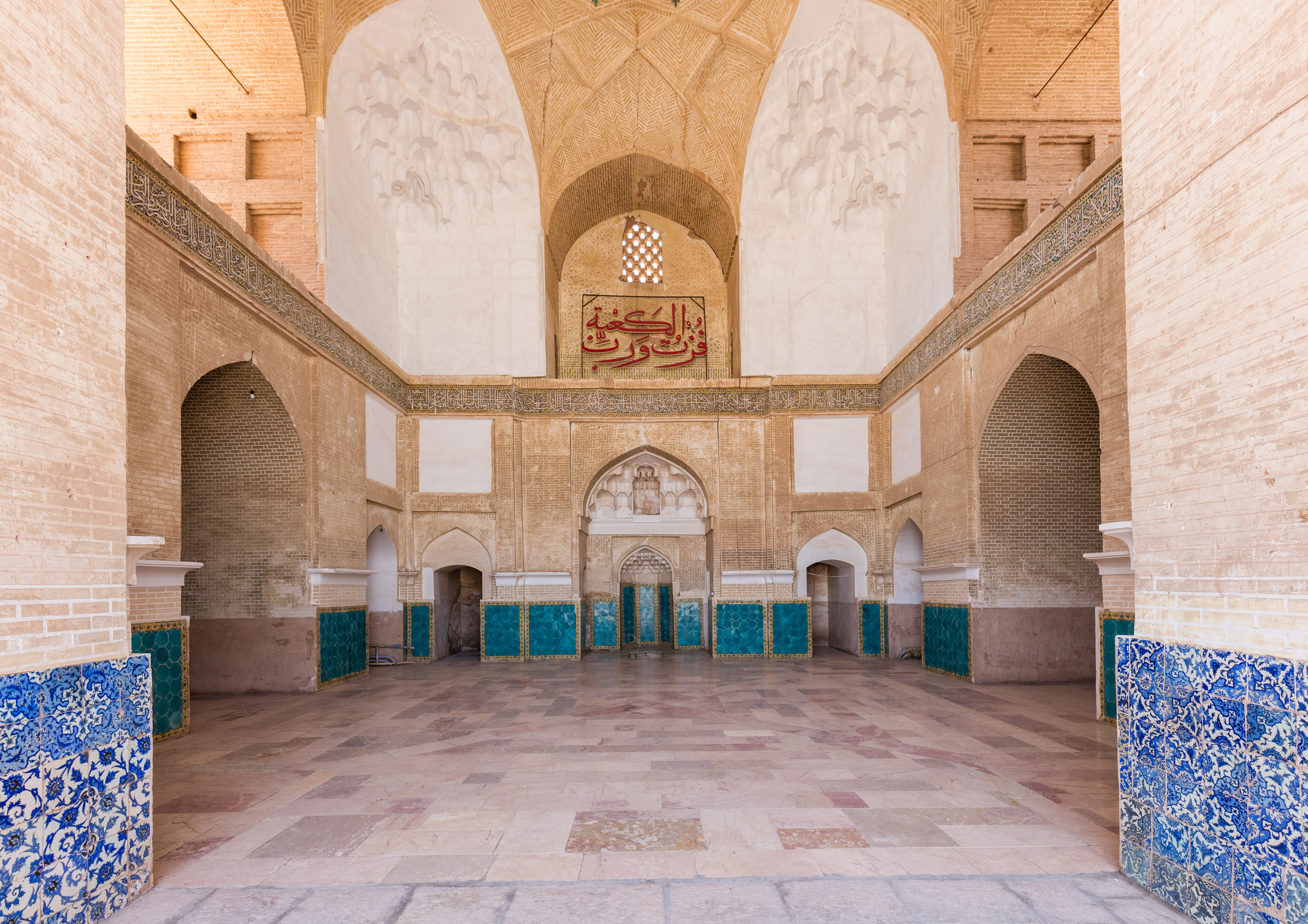
The mihrab room

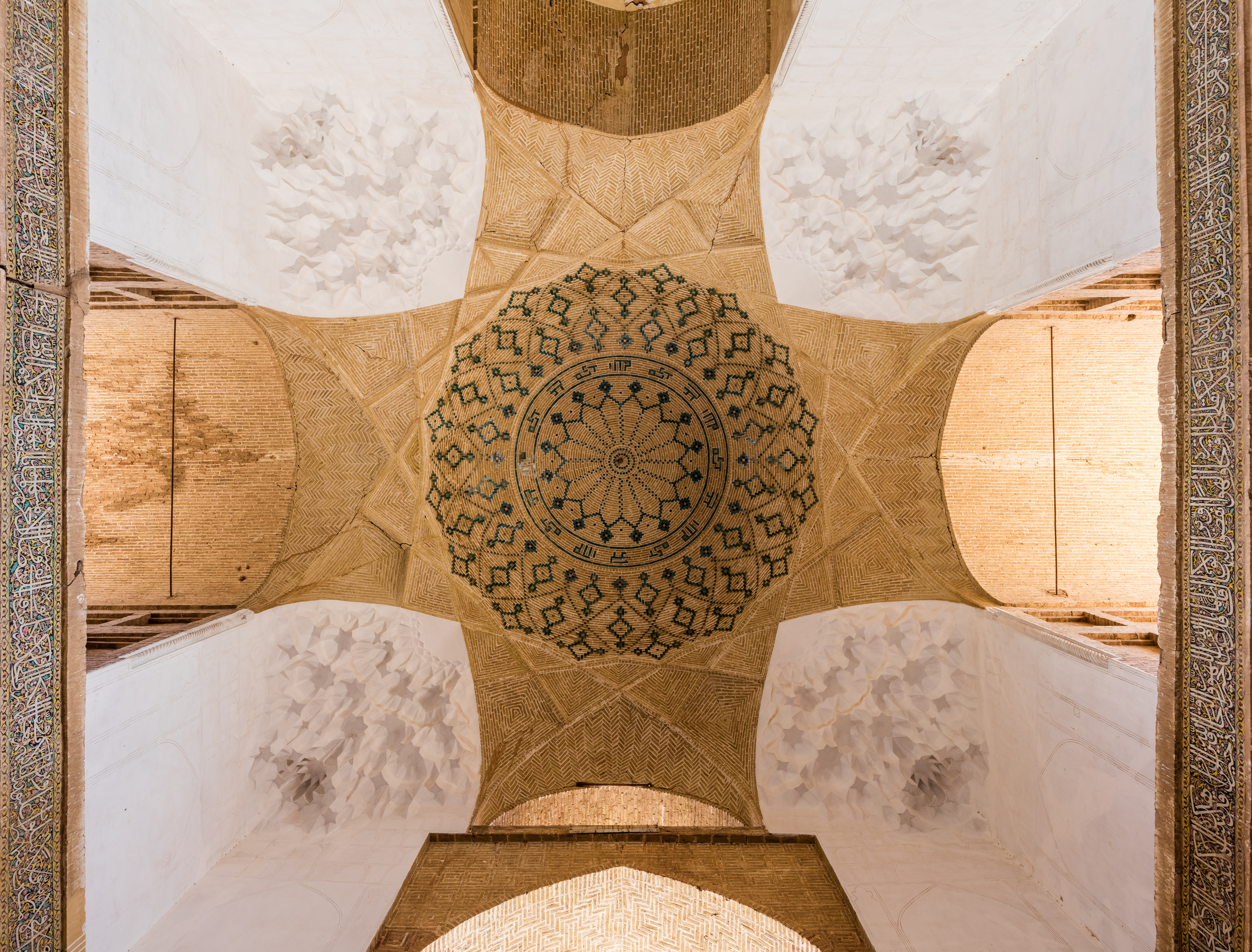
The ceiling of the main dome above the mihrab

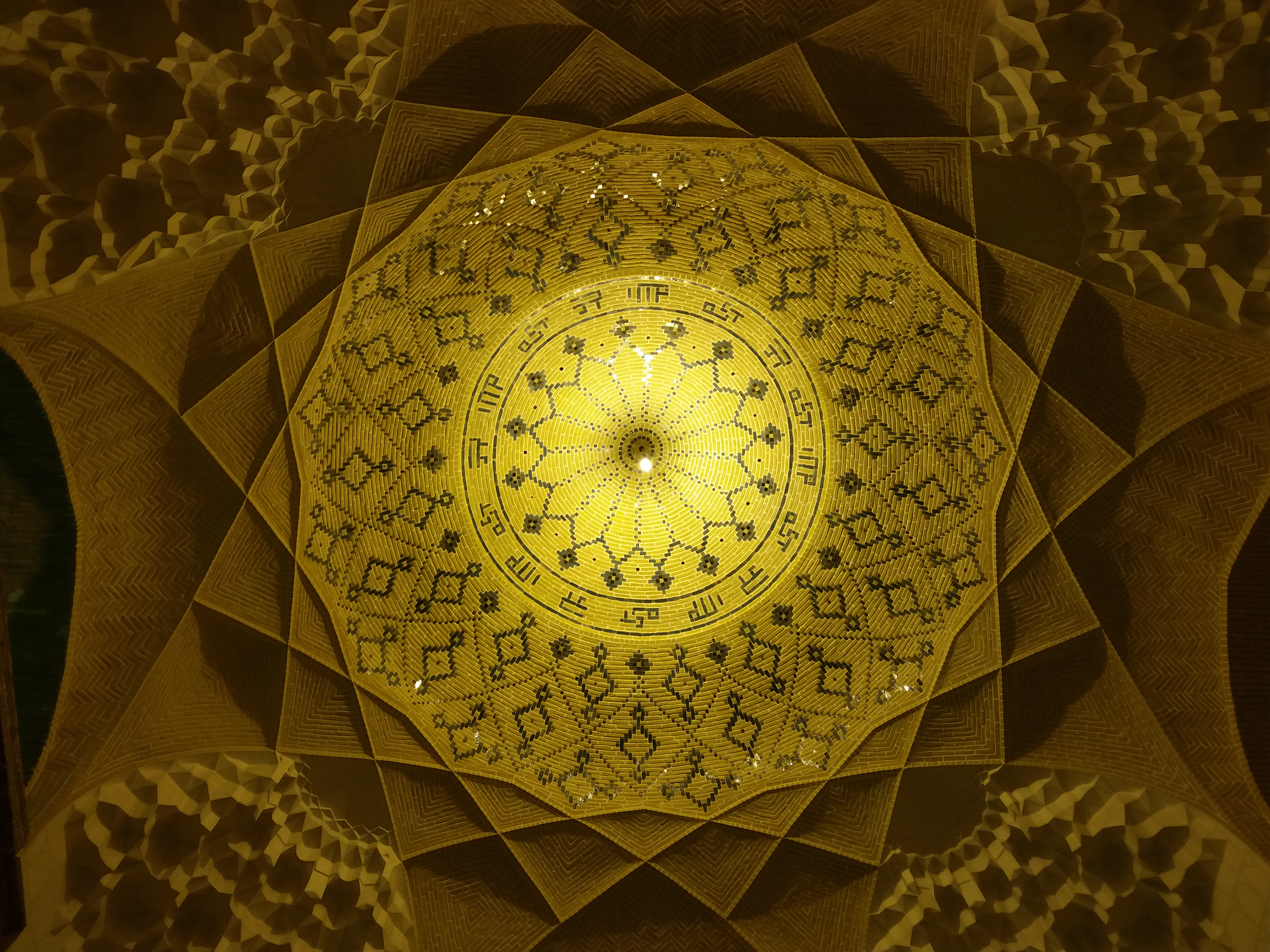
The same dome under different lighting conditions

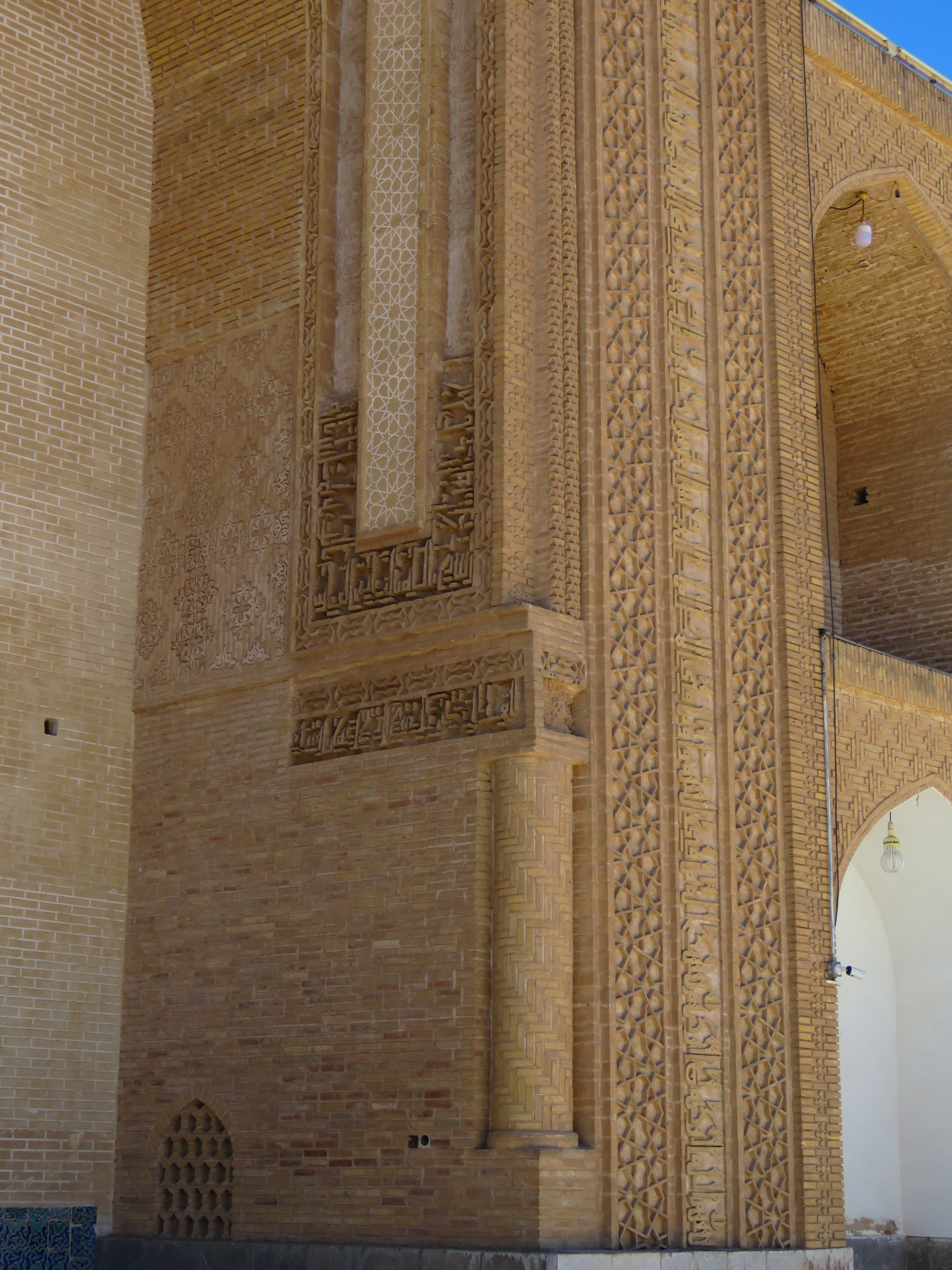
Some of the terracotta and stucco decoration on the main iwan

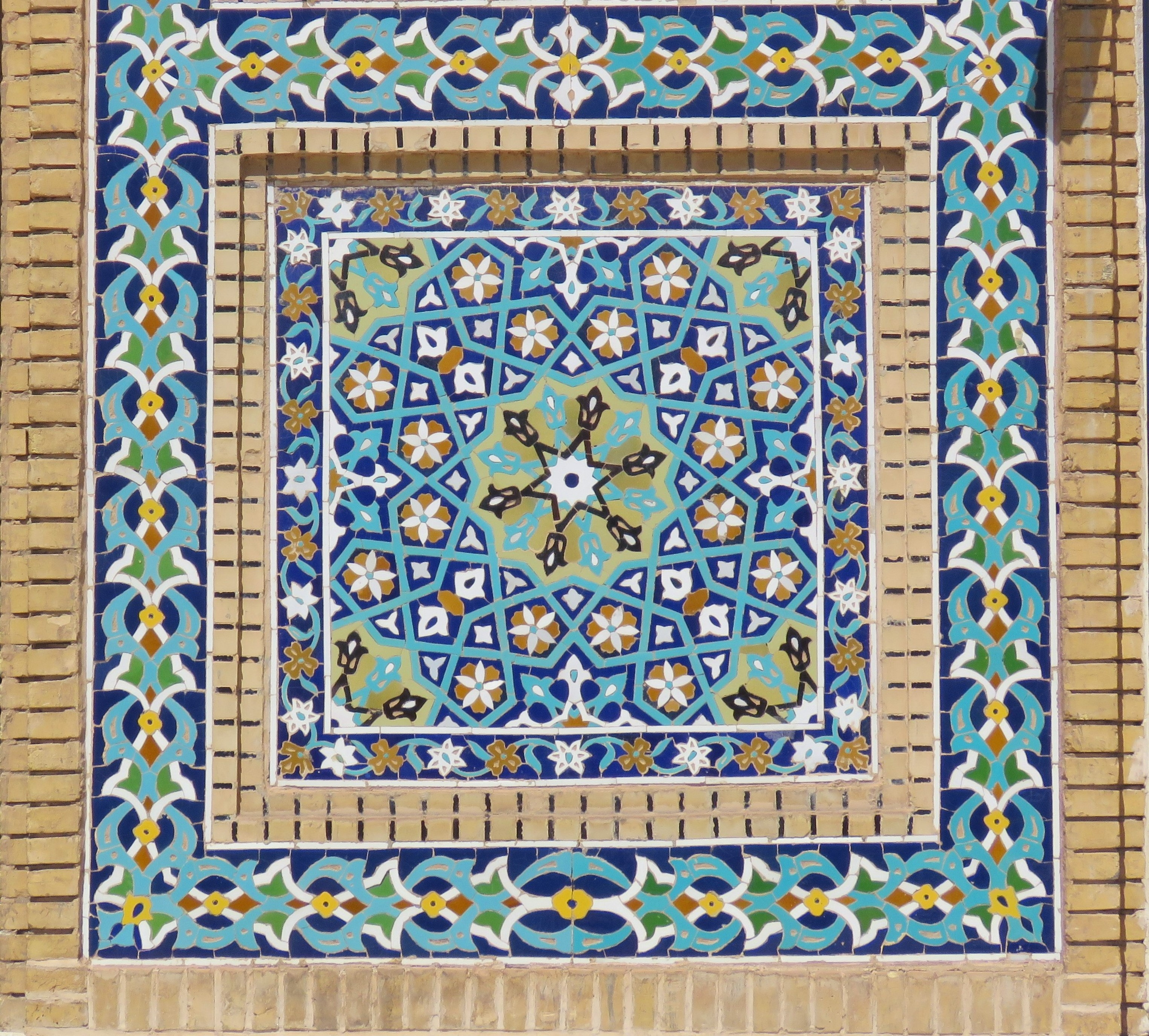
Colorful mo'araq on the side of one of the iwans

== See also ==
- Shia Islam in Iran
- List of mosques in Iran
