= Fadluya =

11th-century Kurdish tribal chief and emir of Fars

Nizam Al-din Fazl-Allah
- Amir Abu'l-Abbas Fadlawayh

Sepahsalar of Buyids of Fars and chief of Shabankara tribe
- Reign: 1030-1049

Emir Fars
- Reign: 1055-1078
- Predecessor: Abu Mansur Fulad Sutun
- Successor: Turan-Shah (rival king); Abu'l-Abbas ibn Fadluya Hasanuya (successor)
- Died: 1078
- Dynasty: Ramanid branch of Shabankara
- Father: Ali ibn Hasan ibn Ayyub Ramani
- Religion: Islam

Amir Abu'l-Abbas Fadl, better known as Fadluya (also spelled Fadlawayh), was a Kurdish chieftain of the Shabankara in Fars. He was the son of Ali ibn Hasan ibn Ayyub of the Ramani clan of the Shabankara, who were Kurds from Syria that migrated to Fars, and was the founder of the Shabankara dynasty in Fars (r. 1030–1078), which lasted sporadically from 1030 to 1355. The Shabankaras occupied the mountain region of Kuhgiluya and maintained a great scale of independence.

== Early life ==
Earlier in his life, Fadluya's father Ali sent him to Saheb-e Adel, who was then the vizier to the Buyid ruler Abu Kalijar. Ali requested that his son be given a court position. Fadluya rose in rank under Saheb-e Adel and eventually reached the rank of sepahsalar. However, Abu Kalijar "decided to take over the Shabankara territories for himself, which alienated Fadluya".

== Ruler of Fars ==
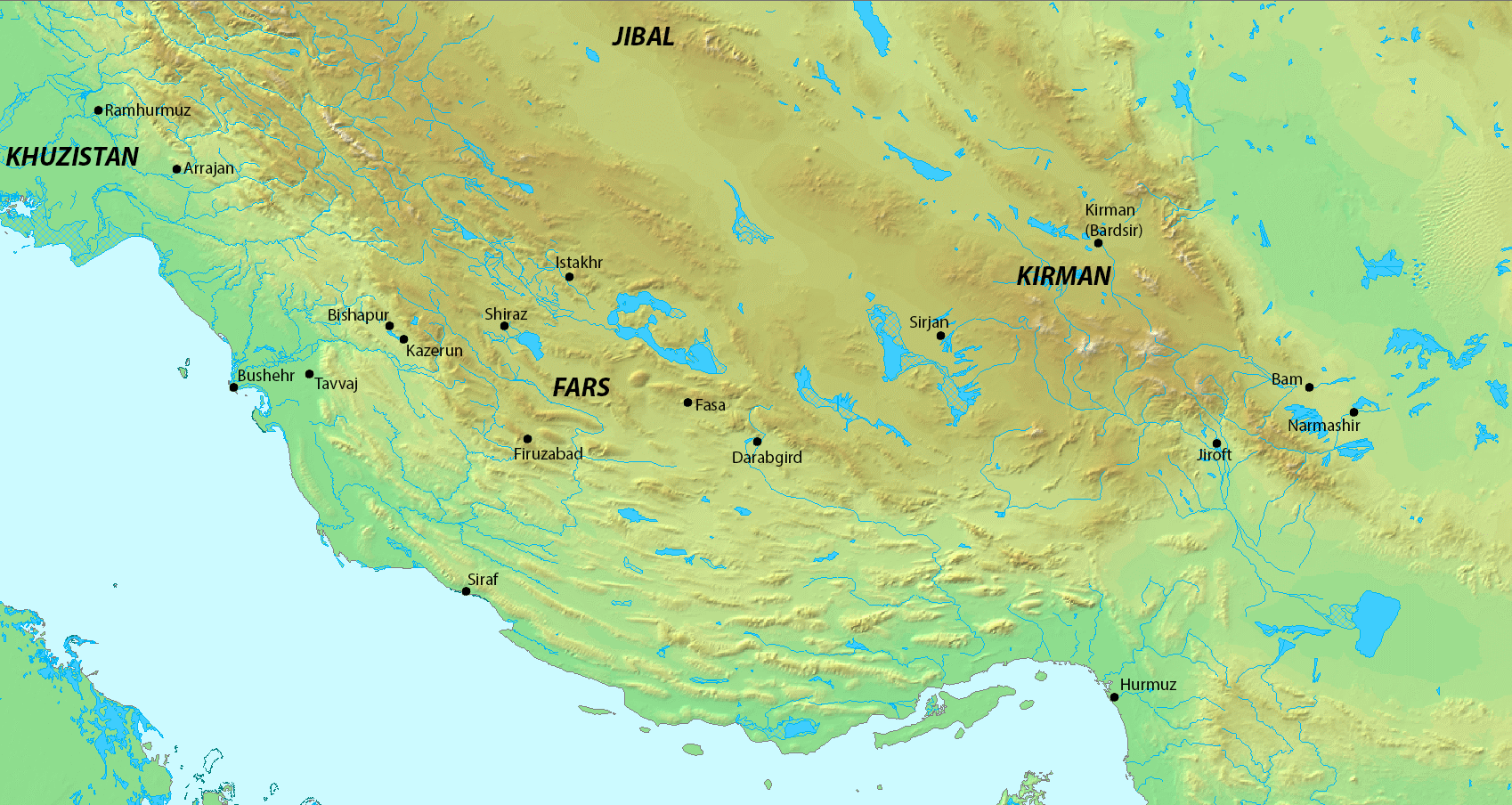
Map of Fars and its surrounding regions in the 10th–11th centuries

When the Seljuk prince Qavurt invaded Fars in 1053, Fadluya turned to Qavurt's brother Alp Arslan. He offered an annual tribute of 27 million dirhams in return for the Seljuks letting him remain ruler of Fars. Alp Arslan accepted, and by 1055 Fadluya had consolidated his rule in Fars. His main capital was at Goshnabad, or Joshnabad, a town somewhere northeast of Fasa. He also sometimes resided at Darabgerd and Shiraz.

Later, in the reign of sultan Alp Arslan, Fadluya rebelled against him. He stopped sending the annual tribute, proclaimed himself an independent ruler, and took up a defensive position at the fortress of Khvorsha near Jahrom. However, this rebellion was unsuccessful – Alp Arslan's vizier Nizam al-Mulk came and ended up capturing the fortress after 16 days. Fadluya surrendered and offered to pay reparations. He was forgiven and allowed to resume his position as ruler of Fars.

Fadluya rebelled again in 1072, and once again Nizam al-Mulk was sent to subjugate him. Nizam al-Mulk's attempt to resolve things peacefully failed; again Fadluya ended up ensconcing himself in a fortress. Nizam al-Mulk began a siege, which only lasted for a relatively short time before the defenders surrendered due to lack of water. Fadluya attempted to flee but was captured and brought before Alp Arslan. Alp Arslan again forgave Fadluya, but this time he had him imprisoned at the fortress of Estakhr.

== Death ==
According to Ibn al-Balkhi, Fadluya remained a prisoner at Estakhr for the rest of his life. In 1078, he attempted to take over the fortress but failed, and he was captured and killed. His skin was stuffed with straw and hung up on public display.

| Unknown | Shabankara ruler (in Fars); 1030–1078 | Unknown |
