= Kerman Seljuk Sultanate =

Seljuk Sultanate in Kerman and Makran

Kerman Seljuk Sultanate: قاوٙرْدیان یا آل قاوٙرد (Persian); Kirman Selçuk Sultanlığı (Turkish); سلطنة كرمان السلجوقية (Arabic)
- 1041 (429 AH) – 1187 (583 AH)
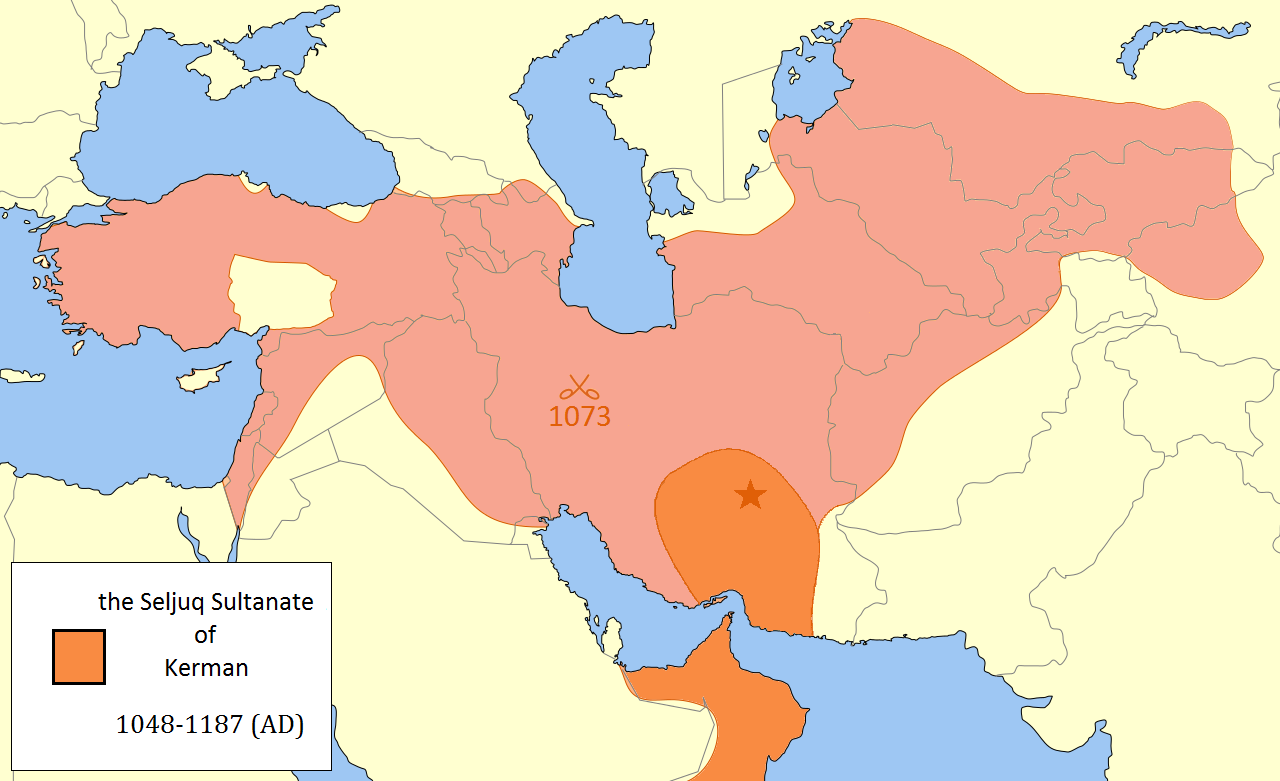
- Status: Sultanate
- Capital: 1041–1186: Kerman (de jure); Bardasir (de facto)
- Capital-in-exile: 1186–1187: Bam
- Common languages: Persian (regional); Oghuz Turkic (dynastic); Arabic (minor)
- Religion: Sunni Islam (official)
- Government: De facto: Seljuk Sultanate under Hereditary monarchy; De jure: Under Caliphate
- Sultan / Shah
  - 1073: Qavurt (first)
  - 1084–1096: Turan Shah I
  - 1096–1101: Iran Shah
  - 1101–1142: Arslan Shah I
  - 1142–1156: Muhammad I
  - 1183–1187: Muhammad II (last)
- Historical era: Middle Ages
  - Established: 1041 (429 AH)
  - Battle of Kerj Abu Dulaf: 1073 (465 AH)
  - Murder of Iranshah of Kerman: 1101 (495 AH)
  - Civil Wars: 1169–1176 (563–572 AH)
  - Invasion of Ghuzz Turks: 1180 (575 AH)
  - Disestablished: 1187 (583 AH)
- Currency: Gold Dinar
Preceded by	Succeeded by
Buyid dynasty	Khwarazmian Empire; Oghuz Turks
- Today part of: Iran; Oman; United Arab Emirates

The Kerman Seljuk Sultanate (Persian: سلجوقیان کرمان; Saljūqiyān-e Kerman) was a Turco-Persian Sunni Muslim state, established in the parts of Kerman and Makran which had been conquered from the Buyid dynasty by the Seljuk Empire which was established by the Seljuk dynasty, which was of Oghuz Turkic origin. The founder of this dynasty, Kara Arslan Ahmad Qavurt who succeeded as ruler of the region after the surrender of Buyid leader Abu Kalijar Marzuban. For first time in this period, an independent state was formed in Kerman; eventually, after 150 years, with the invasion of the Oghuz leader Malik Dinar, the Kerman Seljuk Sultanate fell.

The sultanate was the first powerful local government in the Kerman and Makran region, which, in addition to attaining political and security stability, would create economic prosperity in the provinces. It was during this period that the Silk Road burgeoned with the flourishing of the ports of Tiz, Hormuz and Kish, and this state, as the highway of this important economic road, would reap the tremendous wealth with the conditions it had created. Regarding scientific and social conditions, at this time, with the efforts of the shahs such as Muhammad-Shah II, the scientific and cultural centers were established in Kerman, which was far away from the main scientific centers, and so it became the regional intellectual center of the southeastern Iranian region. Kerman and Makran under the ruling of Seljuks, improved works in agriculture and animal husbandry, and also in commerce and trade.

== Early history ==
The Seljuqs originated from the Qynyk branch of the Oghuz Turks, who in the 9th century lived on the periphery of the Muslim world, north of the Caspian Sea and Aral Sea in their Yabghu Khaganate of the Oghuz confederacy, in the Kazakh Steppe of Turkestan. During the 10th century, due to various events, the Oghuz had come into close contact with Muslim cities.

When Seljuq, the leader of the Seljuq clan, had a falling out with Yabghu, the supreme chieftain of the Oghuz, he split his clan off from the bulk of the Tokuz-Oghuz and set up camp on the west bank of the lower Syr Darya. Around 985, Seljuq converted to Islam. In the 11th century the Seljuqs migrated from their ancestral homelands into mainland Persia, in the province of Khurasan, where they encountered the Ghaznavid empire. In 1025, 40,000 families of Oghuz Turks migrated to the area of Caucasian Albania. The Seljuqs defeated the Ghaznavids at the Battle of Nasa plains in 1035. Tughril, Chaghri, and Yabghu received the insignias of governor, grants of land, and were given the title of dehqan. At the Battle of Dandanaqan they defeated a Ghaznavid army, and after a successful siege of Isfahan by Tughril in 1050/51, they established an empire later called the Great Seljuk Empire. The Seljuqs mixed with the local population and adopted the Persian culture and Persian language in the following decades.

== Reign of Qavurt ==
=== Establishment ===
After the death of 'Adud al-Dawla on 26 March 983, the Buyid dynasty rapidly weakened due to succession conflicts and external threats. The Buyid dynasty, which had weakned by the reign of Abu Kalijar, was losing territories and was unable to maintain its suzerainty in occupied regions. Following the conquest of Khorasan and the establishment of the Great Seljuk state, Toghrul Bey, the Sultan of the Great Seljuk state, assigned the division of conquered territories among his brothers and nephews and delegated to them the task of conquering new regions. His primary goals were, first, to consolidate his authority over the territories he had already brought under his control, and second, to rapidly expand Seljuk power by subjugating additional regions. Thus, the empire was divided into provinces, and each trusted relative was not only assigned a province to govern but also tasked with the conquest of neighboring lands. Chaghri Beg, as the eldest brother, made Merv and Khorasan his base; and Musa Yabugu was appointed over Bust, Herat, and Sistan.

Qavurt, the son of Chaghri Beg, chose Nahavand and Kerman. Qavurt defeated the Buyid ruler’s army in Kerman and Makran, and brought Kerman under his control. There, he established his own sultanate in 1041 CE and became its de facto ruler as a subject of Tughril I.

=== Alp Arslan's will ===
Alp Arslan died in 1072. He willed his throne to Malik Shah I, his second son. He also expressed his concern about possible throne struggles. The main contestants for the throne were his eldest son Ayaz and his brother Qavurt. As a compromise, he willed generous grants to Ayaz and Qavurt. He also willed Qavurt to marry his widow.

=== Qavurt's rebellion ===
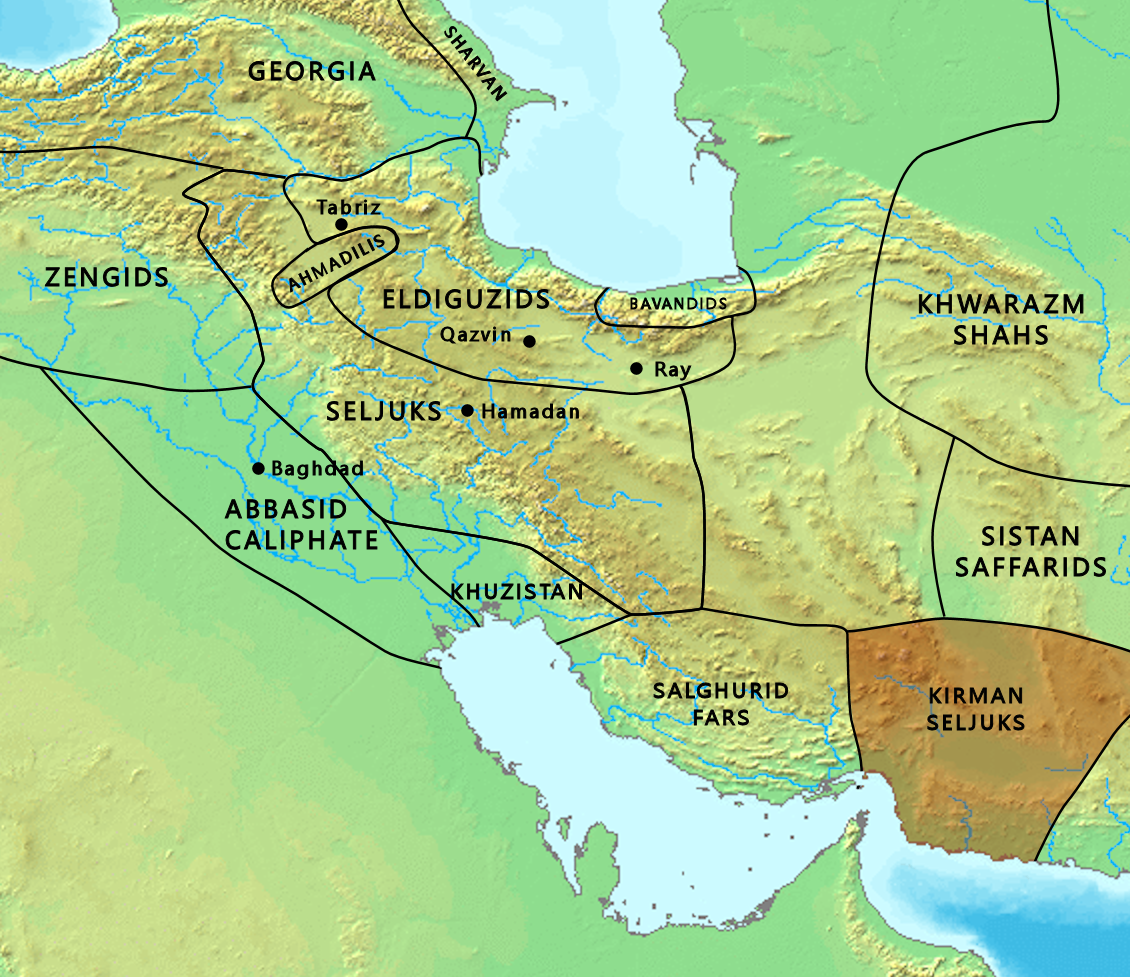
Map of the Kirman Seljuk Sultanate in 1180 CE.

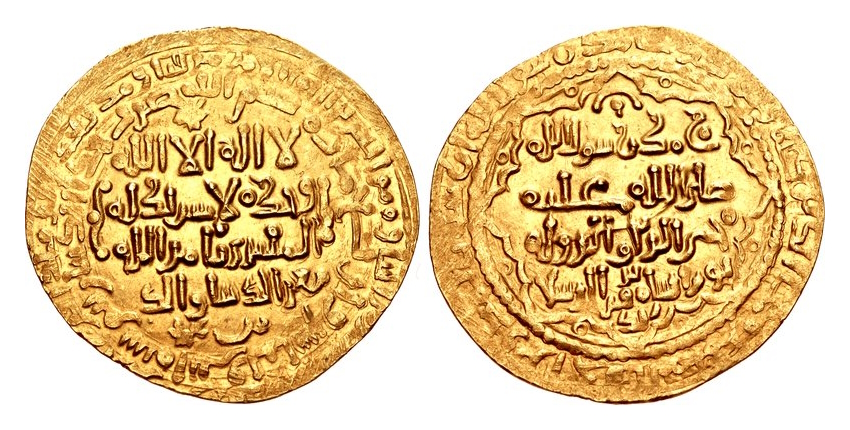
Coin of Turan Shah I. (1085–1097). AV Dinar (27mm, 3.48 g, 6h). Bamm mint. Dated AH 483 (AD 1090–91)

Malik Shah was only 17 or 18 years of age when he ascended to throne. Although Ayaz presented no problem, he faced with the serious problem of Qavurt's rebellion. His vizier Nizam al-Mulk was even more worried for he had become the de facto ruler of the empire during young Malik Shah's reign. Although Qavurt had only a small army, Turkmen officiers in Malik Shah's army tended to support Qavurt. So Malik Shah and Nizam al-Mulk added non Turkic regiments to Seljuk army. Artukids also supported Malik Shah. The clash, the Battle of Kerj Abu Dulaf, was at a location known as Kerç kapı (or Kerec) close to Hamedan on 16 May 1073. Malik Shah was able to defeat Qavurt's forces. Although Qavurt escaped, he was soon arrested. Initially Malik Shah was tolerant to his uncle. But Nizam al-Mulk convinced the young sultan to execute Qavurt. Nizam al-Mulk also executed Qavurt's four sons. Later he eliminated most of the Turkic commanders of the army whom he suspected to be Qavurt's partisan.

== Overthrow ==
The son of Bahram-Shah, Muhammad-Shah succeeded his uncle Turan-Shah II to the throne of Kerman in 1183. By the time of his ascension Kerman had been overrun by bands of Ghuzz Turks. Their devastation of the province had made the city of Bardasir virtually uninhabitable, so Muhammad-Shah made Bam his capital. By 1186, however, Muhammad-Shah been unable to handle the Ghuzz, and he decided to abandon Bam and departed from Kerman. The Ghuzz chief Malik Dinar quickly seized control of Kerman in his place.

Muhammad-Shah at first hoped to receive foreign assistance to reacquire Kerman, and traveled to Fars and Iraq requesting help. He also sought for aid from the Khwarezmshah Tekish. Eventually, however, he realized that he could get no assistance in recovering Kerman. He made his way to the Ghurid Empire and spent the remainder of his life in the service of the Ghurid sultans.

== Seljuq rulers of Kerman ==
No.	Image	Name	Reign	Life details
1		Qavurt عماد الدين كارا أرسلان أحمد قاوورد بن داود چغري; Imad al-Dīn Kāra Arslān Ahmad Qavurt ibn Dāwūd Chaghrī	1041 – 1073 (~32 years)	? – 1073: First Seljuk sultan in Kerman; occupied Kerman, Makran, Oman and Shiraz through conquest.; Led an unsuccessful attempt to seize the Great Seljuk throne.
2		Kerman Shah كرمان شاه بن كارا أرسلان أحمد قاوورد; Kīrman Shah ibn Kāra Arslān Ahmad Qavurt	1073 – 1074 (~1 year)	? – 1074: Son of Qavurt.; Acted as regent in 1073 when Qavurt left for battle.
3		Sultan Shah سلطان شاه بن كارا أرسلان أحمد قاوورد; Rukn ad-Dīn wa-'d-Daula Sultān-Šāh Isḥāq ibn Kāra Arslān Ahmad Qavurt	1074 – 1075 (~1 year) 1074 - 1085 (~11 years) (Note: There are two versions of Sultan Shah's and Hussain Omar's rule in Kerman.)	? – ?: Son of Qavurt.; Submitted to Malik-Shah I following a punitive expediton.
4		Hussain Omar حسين عمر بن كرمان شاه; Hussaīn Omar ibn Kīrman Šāh	1075 - 1085 (~10 years) 1074 (~a few months)	? – ?: Son of Qavurt.
5		Turan Shah I محيي الدين عماد الدولة والدين ملك تورانشاه بن كارا أرسلان أحمد قاوورد; Muhī al-Dīn İmam ed-Dawla wa al-Dīn Turān Shāh ibn Kāra Arslān Ahmad Qavurt	1085 – 1096 (~11 years)	? – 1096: Son of Qavurt.; Recaptured Fars and repelled Emir Unar's expedition.
6		Iran Shah بهاالدین ایران شاه بن تورانشاه; Bahā al-Dīn wa ad-Dawla Irān Shāh ibn Turān Shāh	1096 - 1101 (~5 years)	1059 – 1101 (aged ~41 years): Son of Turan Shah I.; Killed during the Çolak Bëzdar rebellion due to his adoption of Ismailism.
7		Arslan Shah I أرسلان شاه بن كرمان شاه; Muḥyī ’l-Islām wa-’l-Muslimīn Arslan-Šāh ibn Kīrman Shāh	November 16, 1101 - 1142 (~41 years)	? – 1145: Son of Kerman Shah.; Repelled the attacks of Jawali Saqawa.; Imprisoned and dethroned by his son Muhammad Shah I.
8		Muhammad Shah I مُعيص الدنيا والدين محمد بن أرسلان شاه; Muġīṯ ad-Dunyā wa-’d-Dīn Muḥammad ibn Arslan-Šāh	1142 - June 27, 1156 (~14 years)	? – June 27, 1156: Dethroned his elderly father and prevailed as ruler of Kerman against his brothers Kīrman-Shah (heir apparent) and Saljuk-Shah, who took over Oman.; Took great interest in astronomy, had libraries built in Kerman.
9		Tuğrul Shah معيط الدنيا والدين طغرل شاه بن محمد شاه; Muġīṯ ad-Dunyā wa-’d-Dīn Tuğrul Shah ibn Muhammad Šāh	June 27, 1156 - March 1170 (~14 years)	? – March 1170: Son of Muhammad Shah I.; Maintained friendly relations with the Salghurids.
10		Bahram Shah أبو منصور بهرام شاه بن طغرل شاه; Abū Manṣūr Bahrām-Šāh ibn Tuğrul Šāh	March 1170 - 1170 (~a few months)	? – March 1175: First Reign.; Son of Tuğrul Shah.; Supported by Atabeg Mu'ayyed ed-Din Reyhan.
11		Arslan Shah II أرسلان شاه بن طغرل شاه; Arslān-Šāh ibn Tuğrul Šāh	circa. 1170 (~a few months)	? - March 3, 1177: First Reign.; Son of Tuğrul Shah.; Supported by Qutub al-Din Mohammad ibn Bozkuş, his brother Terken Shah, and the Atabeg of Yazd
(10)		Bahram Shah أبو منصور بهرام شاه بن طغرل شاه; Abū Manṣūr Bahrām-Šāh ibn Tuğrul Šāh	circa. 1171 (~a few months)	? – March 1175: Second Reign.
(11)		Arslan Shah II أرسلان شاه بن طغرل شاه; Arslān-Šāh ibn Tuğrul Šāh	circa. 1172 - 1175 (~3 years)	? - March 3, 1177: Second Reign.
(10)		Bahram Shah أبو منصور بهرام شاه بن طغرل شاه; Abū Manṣūr Bahrām-Šāh ibn Tuğrul Šāh	1175 - March 1175 (~a few months)	? – March 1175: Third Reign.
12		Muhammad II Shah محمد شاه بن أبي منصور بهرام شاه; Muhammad Šāh ibn Abū Manṣūr Bahrām-Šāh	circa. 1175 (~a few days)	circa. 1147 – 1187: First Reign.; Supported by Qutub al-Din Mohammad ibn Bozkuş.
(11)		Arslan Shah II أرسلان شاه بن طغرل شاه; Arslān-Šāh ibn Tuğrul Šāh	1175 - March 3, 1177 (~1 year)	? - March 3, 1177: Third Reign.; Killed in battle with Turan Shah II.
13		Yawlak ibn Arslan Shah يافلاك بن أرسلان شاه; Yawlak ibn Arslān-Šāh	March 1177 (~a few days)	? - ?: Son of Arslan Shah II.; Blinded by Turan Shah II.
14		Turan Shah II توران شاه بن طغرل شاه; Tūrān-Šāh ibn Tuğrul Šāh	March 3, 1177 - June 1183 (~5 years)	? - June 1183: Supported by the Salghurids.; Son of Tuğrul Shah.; Assassinated by Zafir Muhammad Amirek.
(12)		Muhammad II Shah محمد شاه بن أبي منصور بهرام شاه; Muhammad Šāh ibn Abū Manṣūr Bahrām-Šāh	June 1183 - September 1187 (~3 years)	circa. 1147 – 1187: Second Reign.; Placed on the throne by Zafir Muhammad Amirek, who was later killed by him.; Overthrown by Oghuz chieftain Malik Dinar.; Sought help from Great Seljuks of Iraq, followed by the ruler of Bam and later Ala al-Din Tekish.; Lived his life in exile in service of the Ghurids.

Muhammad abandoned Kerman, which fell into the hands of the Oghuz chief Malik Dinar. Kerman was eventually annexed by the Khwarezmid Empire in 1196.

Family tree of the Shahs of Kerman

Duqaq Temur Beg
Seljuk Bey
Mikail Yabughu	Arslan Yabughu	Musa Yabghu	Yunus	Yusuf
Dawud Chaghri Bey	Tughril Bey; Sultan
Alp Arslan; Sultan	Qavurt; Shah of Kerman	Sulayman ibn Chaghri	Yaquti ibn Chaghri
Kerman Shah; Shah of Kerman	Sultan Shah; Shah of Kerman	Turan Shah I Shah of Kerman	Amirān-Shah	Mustazhiriyya; Daughter of Qavurt	Hüseyin Shah	Mardan Shah	Ömer Shah	Nuh	Dawud
Hussein Omar Shah; Shah of Kerman	Arslan Shah I Shah of Kerman	Iran Shah; Shah of Kerman	Son of Ghiyath ad-Din Mas'ud
Toghrul Shah	Muhammad I ibn Arslan; Shah of Kerman	Kerman Shah	Saljuk Shah
Toğrul Shah; Shah of Kerman	Mahd Rafi Khatun (Note: Spouse of Muhammad II ibn Mahmud)
Bahram Shah; Shah of Kerman	Arslan Shah II; Shah of Kerman	Turan Shah II; Shah of Kerman	Terken Shah
Muhammad-Shah II; Shah of Kerman	Yawlak ibn Arslan; Shah of Kerman

== Sources ==
- Bāstānī Rād, Hasan (1390), Nezām-i Pāytakhti-ye Irān dar ʿAsr-i Saljuqiyān: Bā Taʾkīd bar Dār al-Mulk-hā-ye Kermān, Tehran: Motāleʿāt-i Tārikh-i Farhangi (Studies in Cultural History), no. 10
- Bosworth, C. E. (2004). The New Islamic Dynasties: a Chronological and Genealogical Manual. Edinburgh University Press. ISBN 0-7486-2137-7.
- Grousset, Rene (1988). The Empire of the Steppes: a History of Central Asia. New Brunswick: Rutgers University Press. p. 147. ISBN 0813506271.
- Peacock, A.C.S., Early Seljuq History: A New Interpretation; New York, NY; Routledge; 2010
- Previté-Orton, C. W. (1971). The Shorter Cambridge Medieval History. Cambridge: Cambridge University Press.
