= Shabankara =

Iranian tribe

Šwānkāra شوانکارە
- 1030–1424
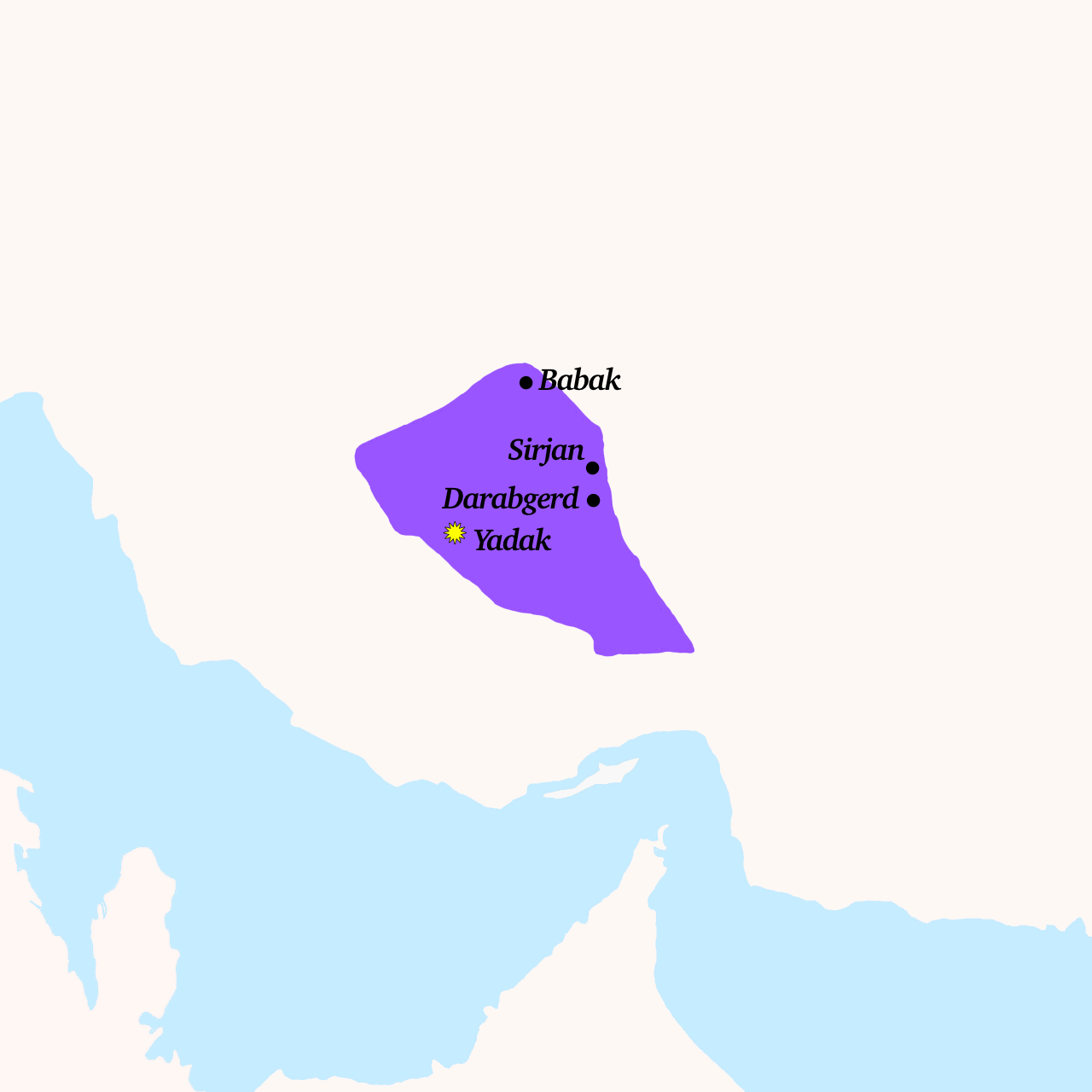
- Map of Iran during Anarchy Era 1328-1384 AD. Shabankara in purple.
- Capital: Ij (Ig)
- Religion: Sunni Islam
- Government: Monarchy (princely confederation)
- Amir/Malik
  - 1030–1078: Fadluya
  - c.1310 (?)-1355: Ardashir
- History
  - Established: 1030
  - Shabankara overthrown by Timurids: 1424
Preceded by	Succeeded by
Buyid dynasty	Timurid Empire; Muzaffarid dynasty

Shabankara or Shwankara (Persian: شبانکاره, Kurdish: شوانکارە) was an Iranian tribe. They claimed descent from the mythical Iranian king Manuchehr and from the founder of the Sasanian Empire, Ardashir I. They had been deported to eastern Fars from Isfahan and Syria by the Buyid Shahanshah 'Adud al-Dawla (r. 949–983). The dynasty's capital was Ij (Ig) and was divided in six districts: Zarkān, Iṣṭabānān, Burk-Tārum-K̲h̲ayra, Nayriz, Kurm-Rūnīz-Lār, and Darabjird. The tribe had the following subdivisions: Ismāʿīlī, the Rāmānī, the Karzuwī, the Masʿūdī and the S̲h̲akānī who were all herders and warriors.

There is a contemporary Kurdish tribe named Shabankara in Kermanshah province. Abu Tahir ibn Muhammad, a descendant from the Shabankara went on to found the Kurdish Hazaraspid dynasty in the 12th century.

== Origin ==
Several scholars consider the Shabankara as being ethnic Kurdish. However, Potts contested their Kurdish origin and argued that "Kurd" was a generic late-Antiquity non-ethnic term for Iranian nomads. Andrew Peacock also questioned whether the Shabankara were actually Kurdish. Moreover, other modern scholars point out that during the medieval era, "Kurd" was a social label and should not be construed as an ethnic designation.

== History ==
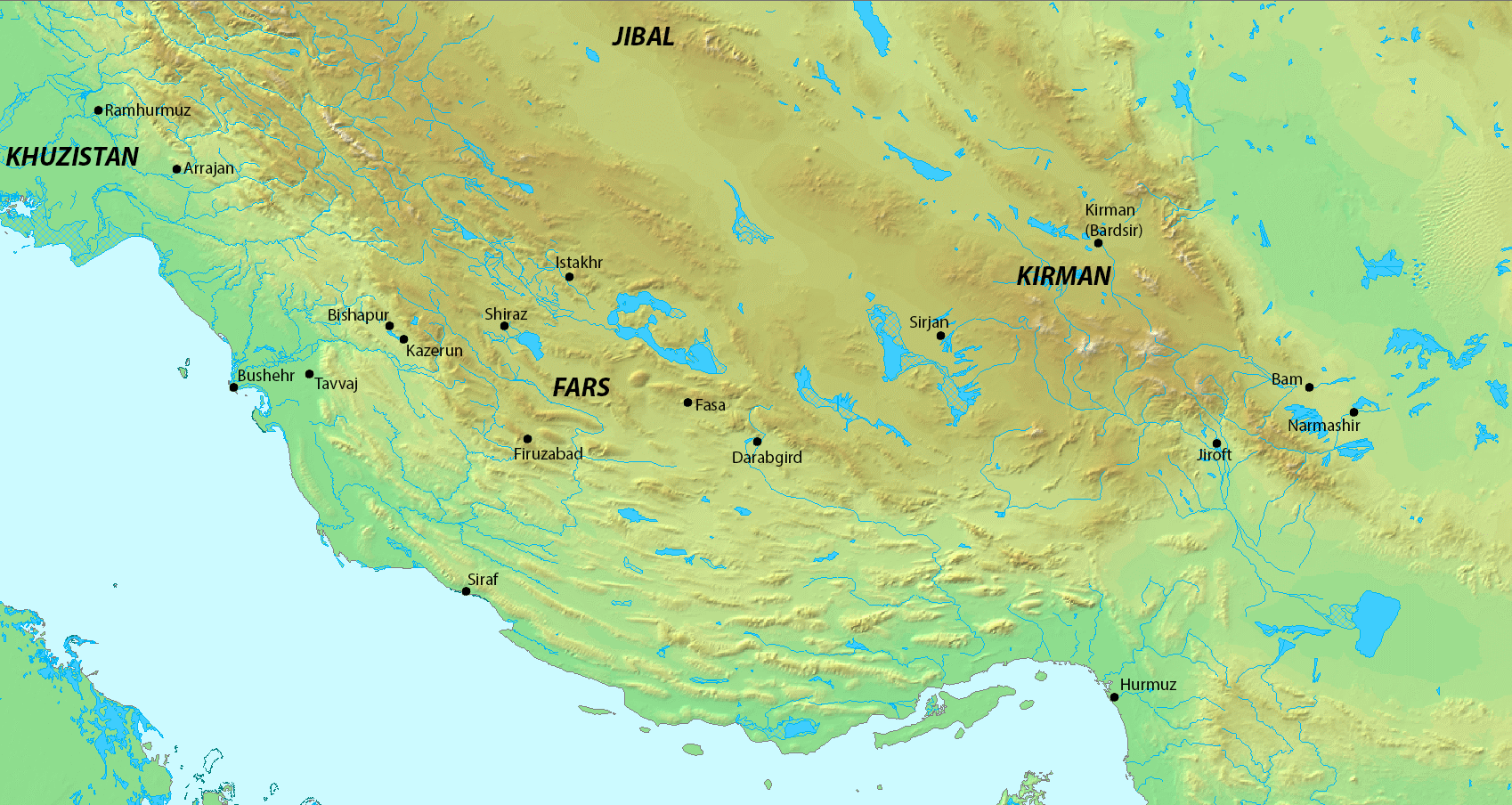
Map of Fars and its surrounding regions in the 10th–11th centuries

The Ramanid branch of the Shabankara rose in power with their chief Fadluya. He was the son of the Shabankara chief Ali bin al-Hassan, and rose to the ranks of the Buyid Army, in the service of Sahib-i Adil, the vizier of the Buyid king of Fars. Sahib-i Adil was put on death by the last Buyid of Fars, Abu Mansur Fulad Sutun, and Fadluya rose in rebellion after this. Abu Mansur was defeated and murdered with his mother in 1062. The Shabankara chief, now ruler of Fars, soon came into collision with the Seljuk Turks. Fadluya submitted to Qawurd, brother of sultan Alp Arslan, but afterwards revolted. Fadluya was finally captured and executed in 1071 by the Seljuk vizier Nizam al-Mulk. The Shabankara were a nuisance in the provinces of Kerman and Fars. In 1099, with the help of the son of Qawurd, Iran Shah, they defeated the wali of Fars, Amir Unar. In 1116, the Shabankara chief Abu-al Hasan Khuzraw refused to pay homenage to the new governor of Fars, Fakhr al-din Cawuli. Cawuli besieged Khuzraw in his fortress, but came on terms with him later. Khuzraw accompanied the governor in his campaigns in Kerman. In the time of the Sekjuk sultan, Mahmud II (1117–1131), the Shabankara were illtreated and revolted again, bringing great damage to the area. The founder of the Hazaraspid dynasty, Abu Tahir ibn Muhammad, defeated the Shabankara and gained great prestige for this. After collapse of Seljukids, Shabankara ruled again the area with Shahre-Idaj as their capital. In Ilkhanid era they ruled Shabankareh province centered at Darabgird.

The Shabankara chief Kutb-al din Mubariz and his brother Nizam al din Mahmud conquered Kerman in 1200 from the Oghuz Turks, but lost it to a local rebellion and an oghuzz counter-offensive. Finally the atabeg of Fars, Sad ibn Zengi defeated the Shabankara.

In 1260, the Mongol invasor Hulegu destroyed Ig and killed the Shabankara chief Muzaffar al-Din Muhammad ibn al-Mubariz in 1260. In 1312, the Shabankara rebelled against the Ilkhans but were defeated. In 1355, the Muzzafarid Mubariz al din send his son Mahmud against the chief Ardashir, who refused to follow his orders. The chief was defeated and his country was taken by the Muzzafarid. It is possible that the Shabankara has local power until 1424.

== Culture ==
At their court, the Shabankara manifested a combination of strict Sunni orthodoxy and ancient Persian customs. They claimed descent from the founder of the pre-Islamic Sasanian Empire, Ardashir I (r. 224–242), and through him the legendary hero-king Faridun.

== List of rulers ==
- Fadluya (1030–1078)
- Abu'l-Abbas ibn Fadluya Hasanuya (1062–1069)
- Nizam al-Din Mahmud (1068–1080)
- Mubaraz ad-Din Hazarasp (ca. 1080–ca. 1110)
- Hasanwayh I (about 1110–c. 1160)
- Mubaraz I (1160–c. 1190)
- Muhammad Muzzafar (about c.1190–1260)
- Kutb al-Din Mubariz II (1260–1261)
- Nizam al-Din Hasanwayh II (1261–1264)
- Nusrat al-Din Ibrahim (1264–1266)
- Tayyibshah (1264–1282)
- Baha al-Din Ismail (1282–1290)
- Nizam al-Din (1290–c.1310)
- Ardashir (c.1310 (?)–1355)

== Sources ==
- Ateş, Sabri (2013), Ottoman-Iranian Borderlands: Making a Boundary, 1843–1914, Cambridge University Press, p. 162, ISBN 9781107245082
- Babaie, Sussan (2019). Iran After the Mongols. Bloomsbury Publishing. ISBN 978-1788315289.
- Büchner, V. F. (2012), "S̲h̲abānkāra", Encyclopaedia of Islam, Brill Publishers, doi:10.1163/2214-871X_ei1_SIM_5253, ISBN 9789004082656
- Christensen, Peter (1993), The Decline of Iranshahr: Irrigation and Environments in the History of the Middle East, 500 B.C. to A.D. 1500, Museum Tusculanum Press, pp. 1–351, ISBN 9788772892597
- Gunter, Michael M. (2009). The A to Z of the Kurds. Scarecrow Press. p. 183. ISBN 9780810863347.
- Luzac; Co (1986). "The Encyclopedia of Islam". The Encyclopaedia of Islam, Vol. III. London: E.J. Brill. pp. 1–1304.
- Oberling, Pierre (2004), Kurdish tribes, Iranica Online
- Potts, Daniel T. (2014), Nomadism in Iran: From Antiquity to the Modern Era, London and New York: Oxford University Press, pp. 1–558, ISBN 9780199330799
- Qazvini, Hamdallah Mustawfi (1915), The Geographical Part of the Nuzhat Al Qulub, translated by Le Strange, Guy, Leiden, ISBN 9781406722734
- Spuler, B. (2012), "Faḍlawayh", Encyclopaedia of Islam, Brill Publishers, doi:10.1163/1573-3912_islam_SIM_2233, ISBN 9789004161214
