= Turan Shah I =

Shah of Kerman (1084–1096)

- Shah
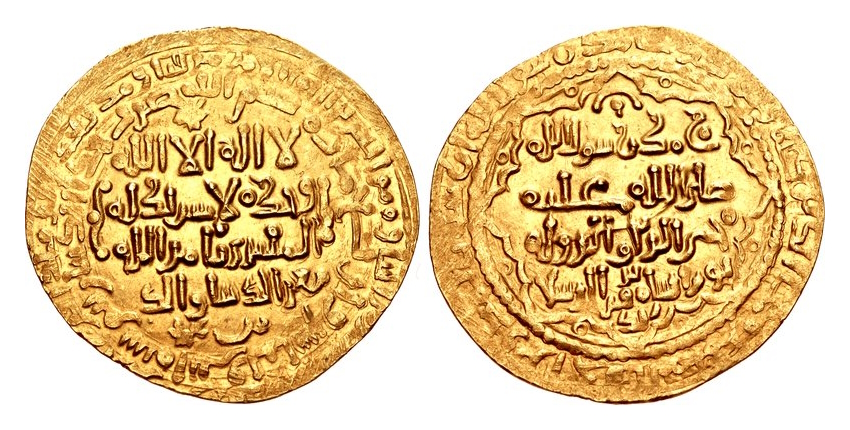
- Coinage of Turan Shah I (1084–1096). AV Dinar (27mm, 3.48 g, 6h). Bamm mint. Dated AH 483 (AD 1090–1)

Shah of Kerman
- Reign: 1084 – 1096
- Predecessor: Sultan Shah of Kerman
- Successor: Iranshah of Kerman
- Died: 1096-97; Kerman, Kerman Seljuk Sultanate
- Issue: Iranshah of Kerman
- Dynasty: Seljuk Dynasty
- Father: Kara Arslan Ahmad Qavurt
- Religion: Sunni Islam

Turan Shah ibn Kara Arslan Ahmad Qavurt (Turkish: Kavurdoğlu Birinci Turan Şah) simply known as Turan Shah I of Kerman was the fifth shah of the Kerman Seljuk Sultanate from 1084 to 1096. He was succeeded by his son Iranshah as the sixth shah of the Kerman Seljuk Sultanate.

== Background ==
Turan Shah belongs to the Seljuk dynasty from his father, Qavurt's lineage. Qavurt, the governor of the Seljuk province of Kerman, incited a rebellion against Malik-Shah I, the Sultan of the Great Seljuk Empire, in 1073. In a battle that took place near Hamadan on 16 May 1073, Malik Shah was able to defeat Qavurt's forces. Although Qavurt escaped, he was soon arrested and subsequently executed along with two of his sons. Qavurt's surviving sons, including Turan Shah, gradually reconciled with Malik Shah and ruled the sultanate as a subordinate of the Great Seljuk State and the Abbasid Caliph. Other brothers of Turan Shah followed the same, ruling the state as a vassal till the collapse of the Great Seljuk State and loss of its authority.

== Biography ==
Turan Shah, the last survivor from amongst Qavurt’s sons, was praised for his justice and piety, and his tomb became a place of pilgrimage. His vizier was the capable al Mukarram b. al-‘Ala’, who won the gratitude of the common people of Bardasir by removing the turbulent Turkish soldiers from the quarters within the town to a new suburb (rabad) outside it, where he also built himself a palace and erected several public buildings.

=== Military Engagements ===
As per Clifford Edmund Bosworth and the historian Ibn-al Athir, in 1094, Terken Khatun, presumably just before her death, deputed Amir Unar to march and wrest Fars from Turan Shah. The attempt failed, in part because the sympathies of the local people were with Turan Shah, who is reported to have been mortally wounded in the fighting.

=== Construction and legacy ===
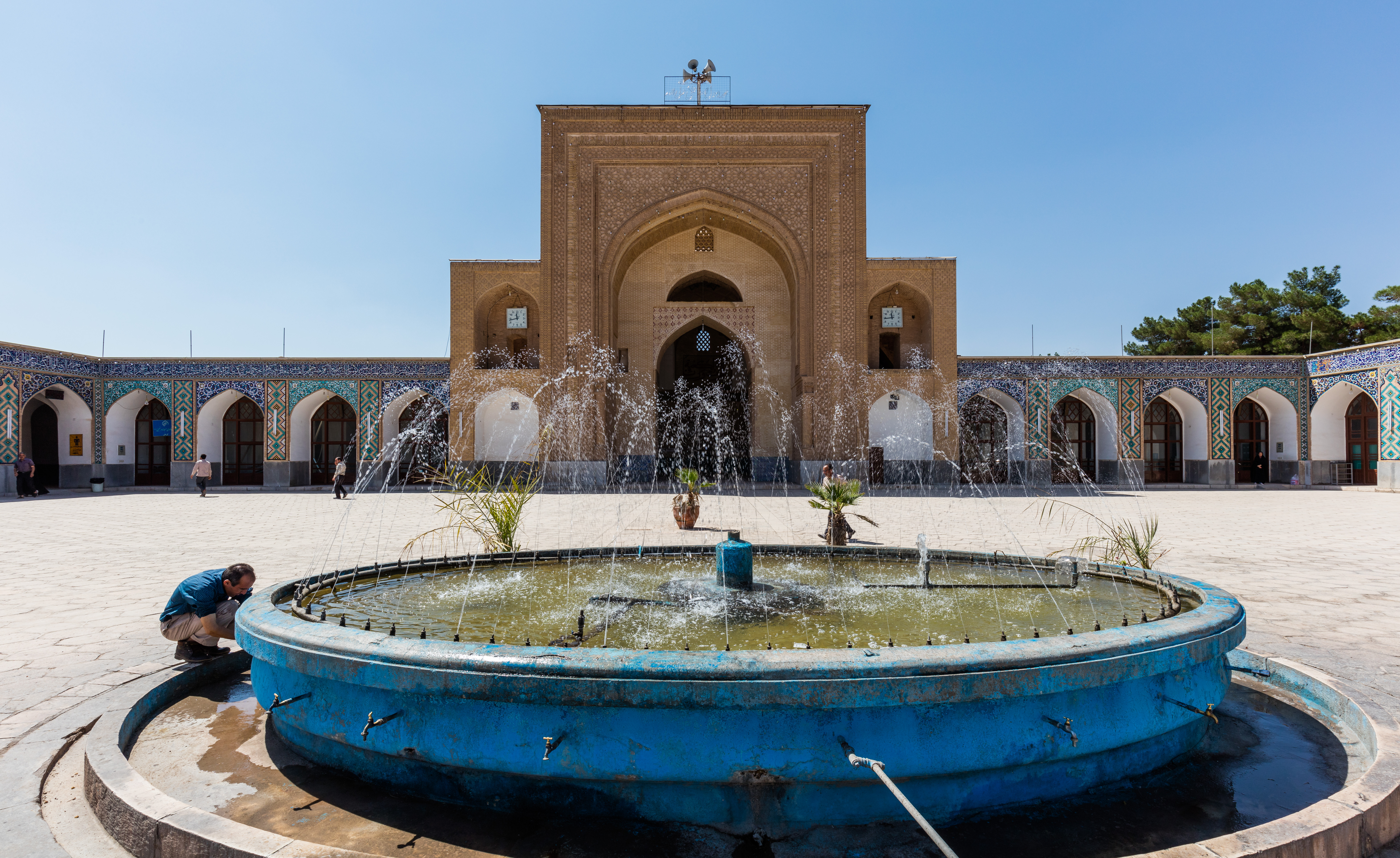
The sahn of the Malek Mosque

Turan Shah is remembered for funding the construction of the Malek Mosque (Masjid-e Malik), the biggest and oldest mosque in Kerman.

The mosque was added to the Iran National Heritage List on 7 October 1967, administered by the Cultural Heritage, Handicrafts and Tourism Organization of Iran.

=== Death and Succession ===
Turan Shah, as per historical accounts, died in 1096/97. He was succeeded by his son Baha’ al-Daula Iranshah, who ruled the sultanate until his assassination in 1011 by the Nizari Ismailis.

== In popular culture ==
In the famous Turkish drama, Uyanış Büyük Selçuklu, Ogün Kaptanoğlu portrays Turan Shah as Malik Shah's hostile cousin and a son of Qavurt.

== See also ==
- Qavurt
- Iranshah
- Kerman Seljuk Sultanate
- Seljuk Dynasty
