= Farrukh-Shah =

Farrukh-Shah (died 1196) was the amir of Kerman from 1195 until his death. He was the son of Malik Dinar.

He became the ruler of Kerman after his father's death in 1195. Unfortunately for him, he was never able to keep the Ghuzz bands residing in the province like his father had. As a result Kerman quickly fell into a state of disorder, with the Ghuzz largely ignoring Farrukh-Shah's rule. Due to these troubles, Farrukh-Shah considered recognizing the Khwarezmshah Tekish as his suzerain. He died before this could be accomplished; Tekish's authority in Kerman, however, was established after Farrukh-Shah's death by individuals loyal to him. A Khwarezmid army was sent to Kerman; the Ghuzz were unable to match it and left the province; many of them subsequently joined the Khwarezmian army.

== Notes ==
| Preceded by Malik Dinar | Amir of Kerman; 1195–1196 | Succeeded by Khwarezmian occupation |
