= Amirān-Shah =

Son of Qavurt

Amirān-Shah was a son of Kara Arslan Ahmad Qavurt, the former Shah of Kerman. He was once sent with a force by his father Qavurt against Sistān, into those outlying parts that were infested with Balūchi brigands.
