= Arslan Shah I =

Sultan of Kerman

- Shah; Sultan

Shah of Kerman
- Reign: 1101 – 1142
- Predecessor: Iranshah of Kerman
- Successor: Muhammad I of Kerman
- Died: 1142; Kerman, Kerman Seljuk Sultanate
- Spouse: Ismat al-Din Zaitun Khatun; Daughter of Muhammad I Tapar
- Issue: Muhammad I of Kerman; Toghril-Shah; Kerman-Shah; Saljuk-Shah
- Dynasty: Seljuk Dynasty
- Father: Kerman-shah ibn Qavurt
- Religion: Sunni Islam

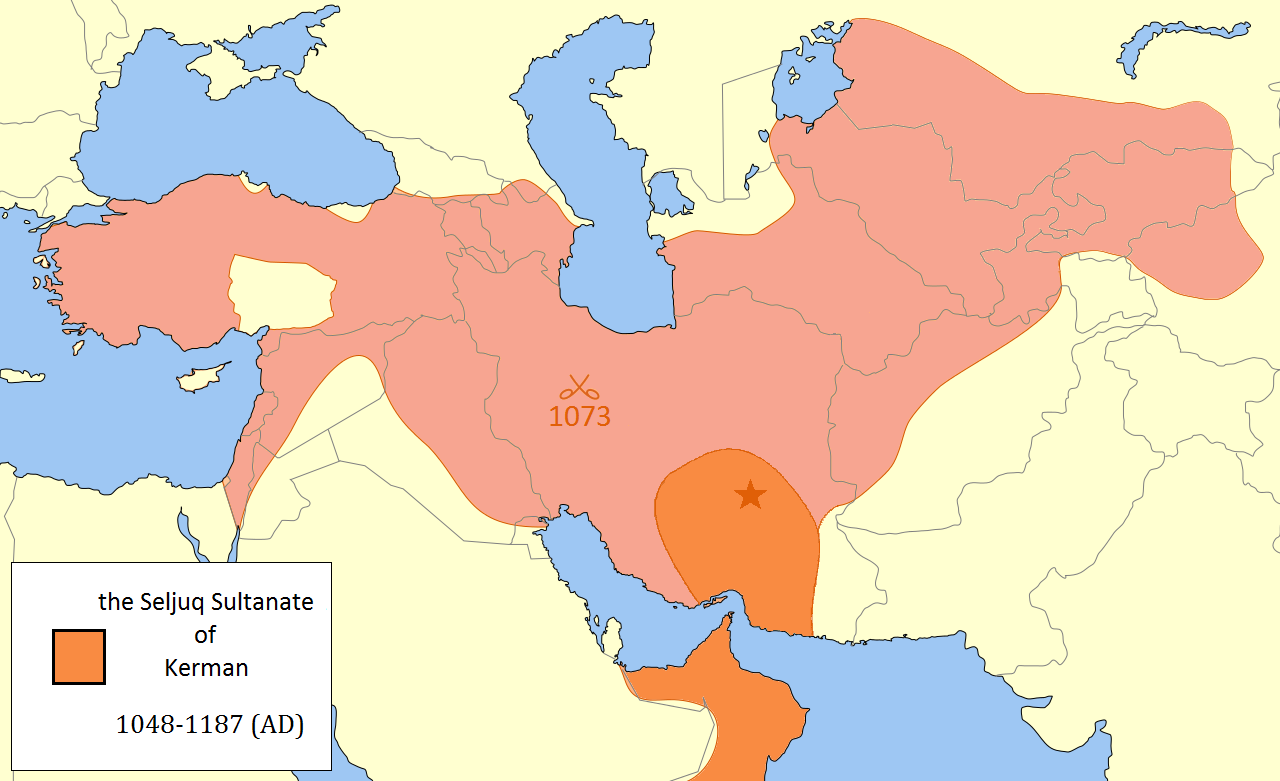

Arslan Shah I was Seljuk Sultan of Kerman from 1101–1142, a city in Iran situated at the center of Kerman province. Located in a large and flat plain, this city is placed 1,076 km (669 mi) south of the Iranian capital, Tehran.

== Reign ==
Arslan began his reign from 1101. Despite Muhammad bin Ibrahim's limited account, Arslan-Shah's reign seems to have been relatively peaceful and uneventful. He is noted for supporting scholars and the ulema, contributing to Kerman's commercial prosperity during this period. The Persian Gulf's chaos and piracy redirected trade overland, expanding the trading suburb of the capital. The stable Seljuq amirate in eastern central Iran served as a refuge for political exiles and those seeking military assistance. Arslan-Shah also played a role in aiding the Ghaznavid Bahram-Shah, son of Mas'ud III.

Arslan-Shah's diplomatic engagements extended to Yazd, where he interceded on behalf of the final members of the Kakuyid family, who held their fiefs in the region. Subsequently, as a testament to his involvement and perhaps as a result of negotiations, Arslan-Shah was granted ownership of Yazd by one of the Kakuyid claimants. He strategically maintained connections with the Great Seljuqs during his rule in Kerman. Despite his autonomous position, Arslan-Shah was meticulous in respecting the authority of Ahmad Sanjar in Khurasan, refraining from encroaching on his rights.

Notably, when Bahram-Shah sought military assistance, Arslan-Shah, acknowledging Sanjar as the senior representative of the Seljuqs in eastern Iran, declined direct involvement. Instead, he directed Bahram-Shah to seek support from Sanjar. Ultimately, it was through Sanjar's assistance that Bahram-Shah ascended to the throne at Ghazna in 1117, illustrating the complex dynamics and diplomatic intricacies of the time.

== Death ==
Marking the longest rule among the Seljuks of Kerman, the extended and tranquil rule of Arslan-Shah came to a sudden and violent conclusion in 1142. A dispute over the future succession escalated, leading to a burst of aggression from Arslan-Shah's assertive and capable son, Muhammad. In a shocking turn of events, Muhammad seized his own father, causing his demise. Subsequently, he took drastic measures by imprisoning and blinding approximately twenty of his own brothers and nephews.

== Family ==
One of his wives was Zaitun Khatun. She was the daughter of an amir from Harat and had been sold into slavery. Later, she came into the hands of Arslan-Shah, who, when she revealed her origins to him, married her. She was the mother of Kirman-Shah, Arslan-Shah's heir apparent, and was an intelligent woman. She built many madrasas and ribats in Kirman and constituted awqaf for them. She was given the laqab Ismat al-Din and her awqaf were known as the awqaf-i ismatiyya. Another of his wives was the daughter of Muhammad I Tapar. He had four sons, Muammad, who succeeded him in 1142, Toghril, Kirman-Shah and Saljuk-Shah. Kirman-Shah's daughter was married to Seljuk Sultan Muhammad II and after his death to his cousin Sultan Arslan-Shah.

== Sources ==
- Fisher, W.B.; Boyle, J.A. (1968). The Cambridge History of Iran. Cambridge histories online. Cambridge University Press. ISBN 978-0-521-06936-6.
- Lambton, A.K.S. (1988). Continuity and Change in Medieval Persia. Bibliotheca Persica. Bibliotheca Persica. ISBN 978-0-88706-133-2.

Preceded by Iran-Shah	Seljuq Sultan of Kerman; 1101–1142	Succeeded by Muhammad I
