= Battle of Kerj Abu Dulaf =

1073 battle

- Part of Seljuk Civil War
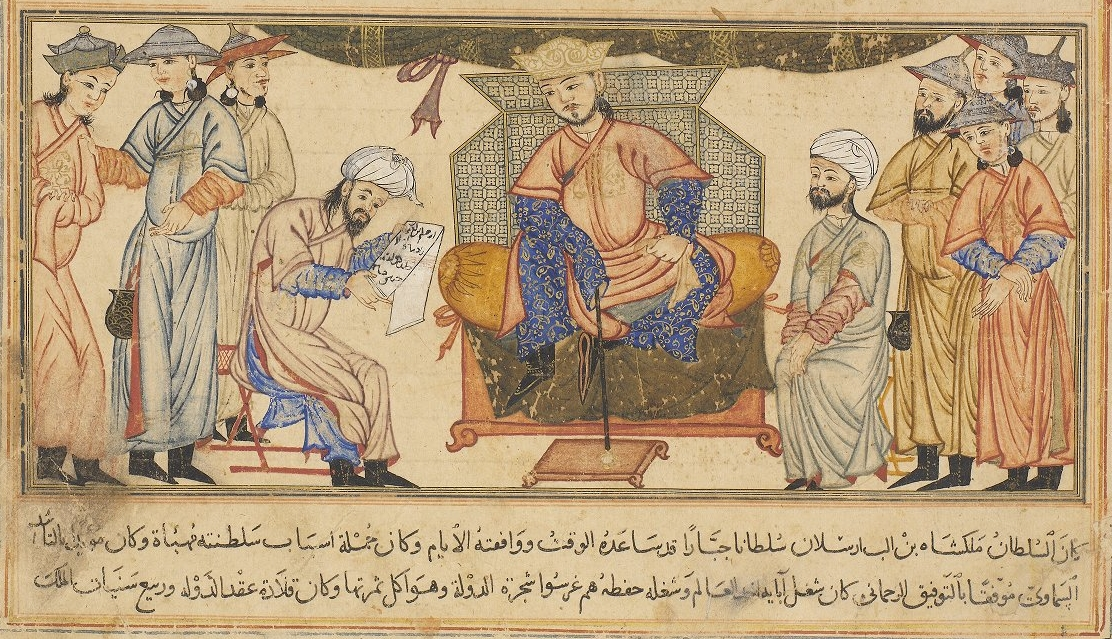
- Malik-Shah I seated on his throne, miniature from the Jami' al-tawarikh of Rashid al-Din Hamadani
Date	1073
Location	Kerj Abu Dulaf, Jebal (near Hamadan)
Result	Malik-Shah Victory

Seljuk Civil War
Seljuk Empire	Kerman Seljuk Sultanate

Commanders and leaders
Malik-Shah I Nizam al-Mulk	Qavurt (POW) †; Sultan-shah (POW)

Strength
Unknown	Unknown

Casualties and losses
Unknown	Unknown

Battle of Kerj Abu Dulaf was fought in 1073 between the Seljuk Army of Malik-Shah I and Kerman Seljuk army of Qavurt and his son, Sultan-shah. It took place approximately near Kerj Abu Dulaf, the present-day between Hamadan and Arak, and was a decisive Malik-Shah I victory.

After death Alp-Arslan, Malik-Shah was declared as the new sultan of the empire. However, right after Malik-Shah accession, his uncle Qavurt claimed the throne for himself and sent Malik-Shah a message which said: "I am the eldest brother, and you are a youthful son; I have the greater right to my brother Alp-Arslan's inheritance." Malik-Shah then replied by sending the following message: "A brother does not inherit when there is a son.". This message enraged Qavurt, who thereafter occupied Isfahan. In 1073 a battle took place near Hamadan, which lasted three days. Qavurt was accompanied by his seven sons, and his army consisted of Turkmens, while the army of Malik-Shah consisted of ghulams ("military slaves") and contingents of Kurdish and Arab troops.

During the battle, the Turks of Malik-Shah's army mutinied against him, but he nevertheless managed to defeat and capture Qavurt. Qavurt then begged for mercy and in return promised to retire to Oman. However, Nizam al-Mulk declined the offer, claiming that sparing him was an indication of weakness. After some time, Qavurt was strangled to death with a bowstring, while two of his sons were blinded. After having dealt with that problem, Malik-Shah appointed Qutlugh-Tegin as the governor of Fars and Sav-Tegin as the governor of Kerman.

== Sources ==
- Bosworth, C. E. (1968). "The Political and Dynastic History of the Iranian World (A.D. 1000–1217)". In Frye, R. N. (ed.). The Cambridge History of Iran, Volume 5: The Saljuq and Mongol periods. Cambridge: Cambridge University Press. pp. 1–202. ISBN 0-521-06936-X.
- Durand-Guédy, David (2012). "MALEKŠĀH". Encyclopaedia Iranica.
