= Turan Shahr =

Turan Shahr توران شهر
- Village
- Location within Iran
- Coordinates: 34°17′02″N 45°46′48″E
- Country: Iran
- Province: Kermanshah
- County: Gilan-e Gharb
- Bakhsh: Central
- Rural District: Howmeh

Population (2006)
  - Total: 31
- Time zone: UTC+3:30 (IRST)
  - Summer (DST): UTC+4:30 (IRDT)

Turan Shahr (Persian: توران شهر, also Romanized as Tūrān Shahr; also known as Tūrān Shāh) is a village in Howmeh Rural District, in the Central District of Gilan-e Gharb County, Kermanshah Province, Iran. At the 2006 census, its population was 31, in 7 families. The village is populated by Kurds.
