= Iranshah (son of Turanshah) =

6th emir of Kerman

Iran Shah
- Shah

Shah of Kerman
- Reign: 1096 - 1101
- Predecessor: Turan Shah I of Kerman
- Successor: Arslan Shah I of Kerman
- Born: Iran Shah; 1059
- Died: 1101 (aged 41–42)
Names
- Baha ad-Din Iranshah ibn Turan
- Dynasty: Seljuk Dynasty
- Father: Turan Shah I of Kerman
- Religion: Sunni Islam; Ismailism

Baha-ad-Din Iran-Shah ibn Turan-Shah (Persian: بهاالدین ایران شاه, 1059–1101, r. 1096–1101), or better simply known as Iran-Shah, was one of the Seljuk rulers of Kerman. During his reign, his kingdom had been heavily reduced and only extended in Kerman and its surroundings. It was reported that he was killed by the Nizari Ismailis, the arch-rivals of the Seljuks.

== See also ==
- Great Seljuk Empire
- Kerman Seljuk Sultanate
- Turan Shah I
- Arslan Shah I
- Seljuk dynasty
