= Muhammad-Shah II =

Seljuk ruler of Kerman (c. 1147 – 1187)

- محمد شاه دوم

12th Seljuk Emir of Kerman
- Reign: 1183–1187
- Predecessor: Turan-Shah II
- Successor: Seljuk of Kerman Dissolved
- Born: c. 1147
- Died: 1187 (aged 40)
Names
- Muhammad-Shah II bin Bahram-Shah
- House: Seljuk Dynasty
- Dynasty: House of Qarvut
- Father: Bahram-Shah

Muhammad-Shah II (c. 1147 – 1187) was the last Seljuk amir of Kerman, from 1183 until 1186.

== Biography ==
The son of Bahram-Shah, Muhammad-Shah succeeded his uncle Turan-Shah to the throne of Kerman in 1183. By the time of his ascension Kerman had been overrun by bands of Ghuzz Turks. Their devastation of the province had made the city of Bardasir virtually uninhabitable, so Muhammad-Shah made Bam his capital. By 1186, however, Muhammad-Shah been unable to handle the Ghuzz, and he decided to abandon Bam and departed from Kerman. The Ghuzz chief Malik Dinar quickly seized control of Kerman in his place.

Muhammad-Shah at first hoped to receive foreign assistance to reacquire Kerman, and traveled to Fars and Iraq requesting help. He also sought for aid from the Khwarezmshah Ala ad-Din Tekish. Eventually, however, he realized that he could get no assistance in recovering Kerman. He made his way to the Ghurid Empire and spent the remainder of his life in the service of the Ghurid sultans.

== Sources ==
- Bosworth, C.E. "The Political and Dynastic History of the Iranian World (A.D. 1000-1217)." The Cambridge History of Iran, Volume 5: The Saljuq and Mongol Periods. Edited by J.A. Boyle. Great Britain: Cambridge University Press, 1968. ISBN 9780521069366

Preceded by Turan-Shah	Seljuq Amir of Kerman; 1183–1186	Succeeded by None
