= Bardsir =

City in Kerman province, Iran

Bardsir Persian: بردسیر
- City
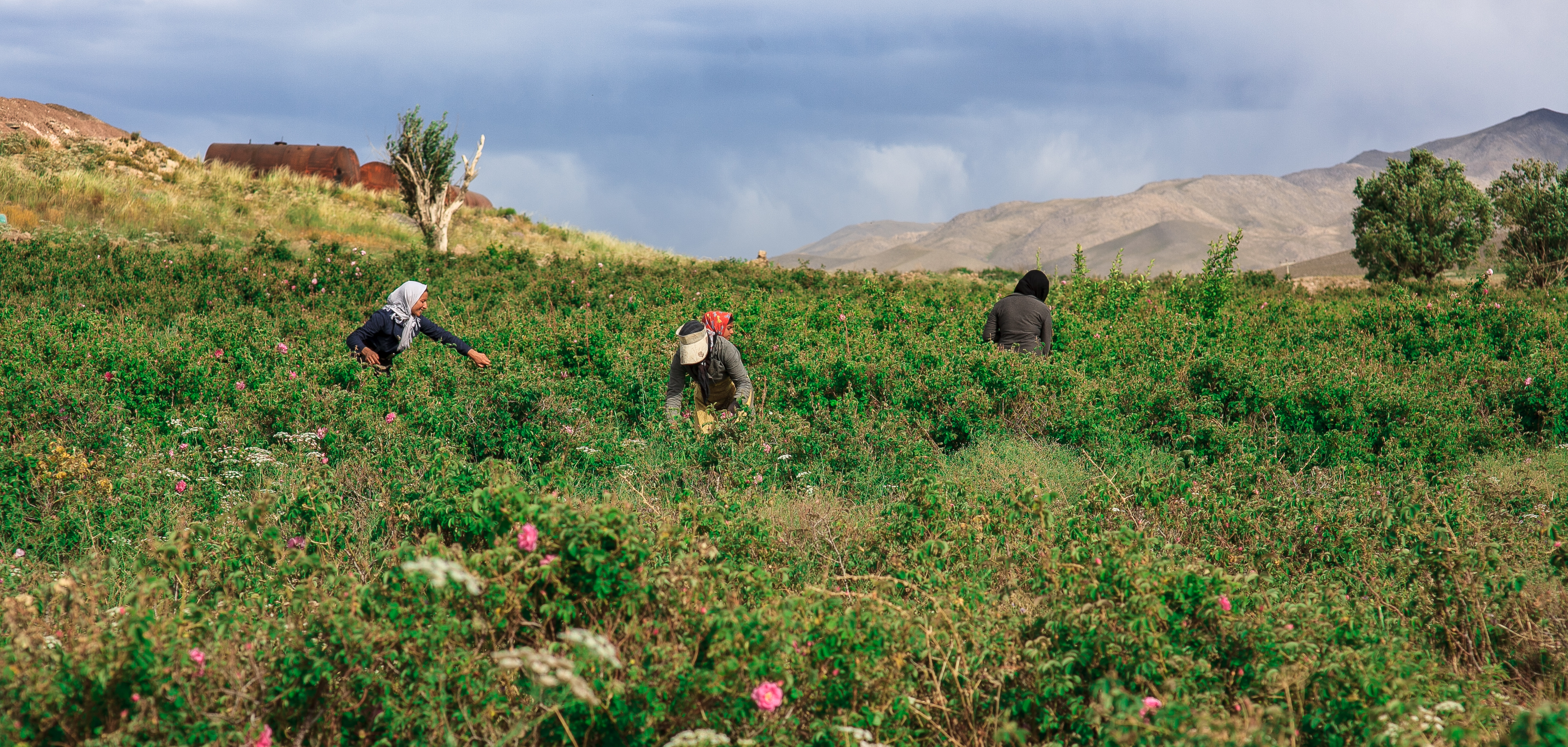
- A tulip field in Bardsir

- Location within Iran
- Coordinates: 29°55′39″N 56°34′35″E
- Country: Iran
- Province: Kerman
- County: Bardsir
- District: Central
- Elevation: 2,047 m (6,716 ft)

Population (2016)
  - Total: 25,152
- Time zone: UTC+3:30 (IRST)
- Area code: 034
- Website: www.bardsir.net

Bardsir (Persian: بردسیر) (Note: Also romanized as Bardesīr and Bardsīr; also known as Deh-e Now-e Mashīz, Mashīz, Mshiz, and Qal‘eh-ye Mashīz) is a city in the Central District of Bardsir County, Kerman province, Iran, serving as capital of both the county and the district. Bardsir was once the capital of the Banu Ilyas dynasty.

== Demographics ==
=== Population ===
At the time of the 2006 National Census, the city's population was 31,801 in 7,391 households. The following census in 2011 counted 31,870 people in 8,377 households. The 2016 census measured the population of the city as 25,152 people in 7,704 households.
