= Georgian campaign against the Eldiguzids =

1209 military campaign by the Kingdom of Georgia

Georgian invasion of Eldiguzids
- Part of Georgian–Seljuk wars
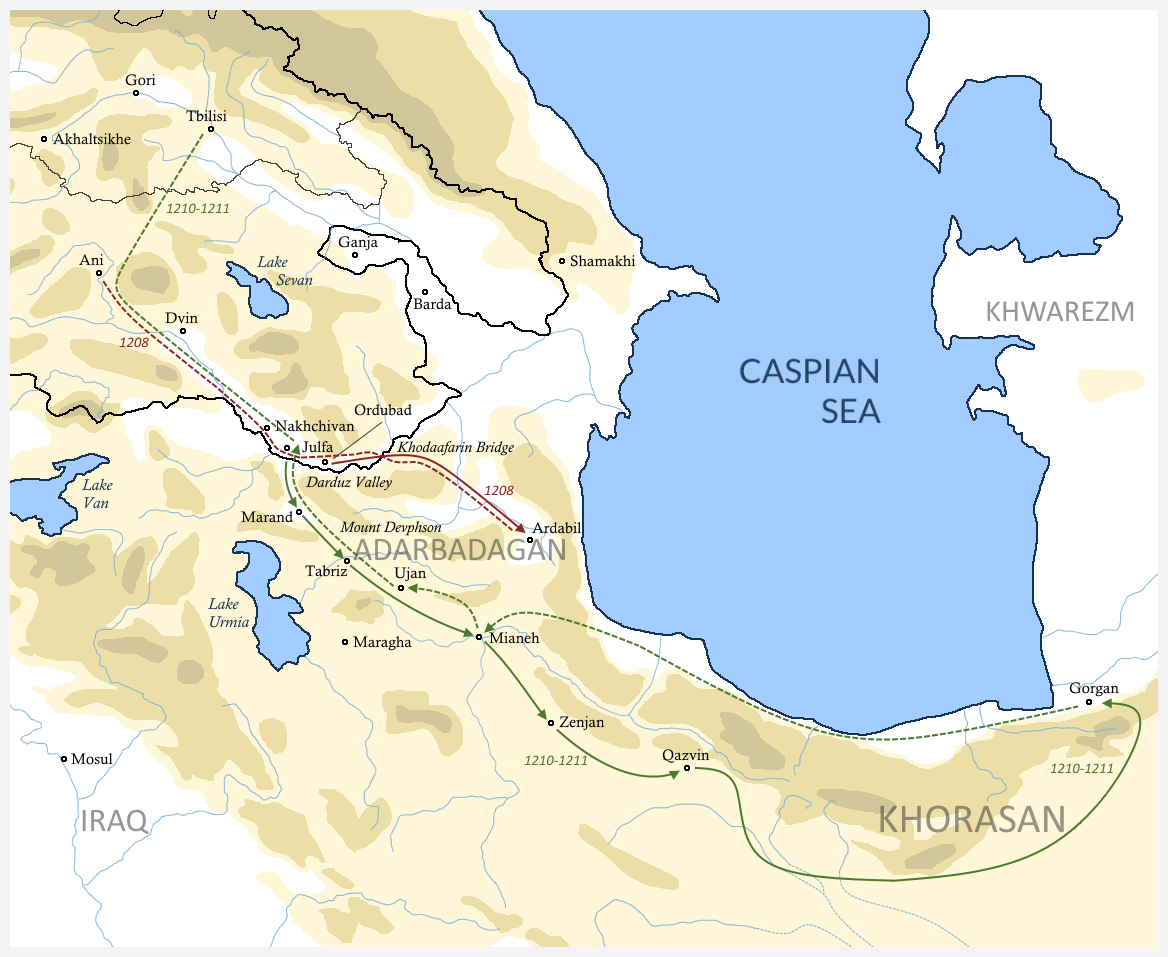
- Georgian invasion of Eldiguzids in 1209 and 1210–1211
Date	1209–1211
Location	Northern Iran
Result	Georgian victory

Belligerents
Kingdom of Georgia	Eldiguzids

Commanders and leaders
(Kingdom of Georgia) Tamar of Georgia; Zakare II Zakarian	Nusrat al-Din Abu Bakr; Muzaffar al-Din Uzbek; Izz al-Din Shams al-Mulk

The Georgian invasion of Eldiguzids was a military campaign led by the Amirspasalar (Commander-in-Chief of the army) of the Kingdom of Georgia, Zakare II Zakarian for Queen Tamar of Georgia, from 1209 to 1211.

In the period from the 12th to the 13th centuries, Kingdom of Georgia actively opposed the Eldiguzids, which was part of its strategy to protect the territory and strengthen power in the Caucasus. The war between the Georgian kingdom and the Eldiguzids also became an important part of the struggle for domination in the region. The Georgian army fought on several fronts, including Battle of Shamkor (also known as the Battle of the Girdiman River) which occurred in 1195, in which Georgia won an important victory.

Such a conflict had long-term consequences for the political and military history of the region, as the Georgian forces were able to strike a blow to the political stability of the Eldeguzids and limit their influence.

The campaign was a response to the 1209 plundering of the Armenian capital of Ani by the ruler of Ardabil, a vassal of the Eldiguzid Atabeg Nusrat al-Din Abu Bakr. Ani had been left unprotected, as the Georgian court was spending Easter at the Palace of Geguti. Ani was thoroughly plundered and a population of 12,000 was allegedly massacred on this Eastern Sunday of 1209.

In retaliation, Zakare raided Ardabil on Ramadan. In 1210, Zakare launched a vast campaign against the Eldiguzids, passing Nakhchivan, and going on to plunder the cities of Julfa, Marand, Tabriz, Meyaneh, Zanjan, Qazvin, and as far as Gorgan. Altogether, it was a journey of about 3,000 kilometers, before going back to the Georgian capital of Tbilisi.

== Sources ==
- Baumer, Christoph (5 October 2023). History of the Caucasus: Volume 2: In the Shadow of Great Powers. Bloomsbury Publishing. pp. 29–30. ISBN 978-0-7556-3630-3.
- Lordkipanidze, Mariam Davydovna; Hewitt, George B. (1987). Georgia in the XI–XII Centuries. Tbilisi: Ganatleba Publishers.
- Rayfield, Donald (15 February 2013). Edge of Empires: A History of Georgia. Reaktion Books. p. 115. ISBN 978-1-78023-070-2.
