= Qizil Arslan =

Ruler of the Turkic dynasty of Eldiguzids from 1186 to 1191

Qizil Arslan قزل ارسلان
- al-Malik al-Mu'azzam
- Possible contemporary depiction of Muzaffar al-Din Qizil Arslan (caption reads "Lord Muzaffar al-Dawla wal-Din", خداوند مظفر الدوله و الدين) in a siege at Khalkhāl against the Isma'ilis. Painted in 1185-1210 Siege Scene Plate (Freer Gallery of Art, F1943.3).

Atabeg of the Eldiguzids
- Reign: 1186–1191
- Predecessor: Muhammad Jahan Pahlavan
- Successor: Nusrat al-Din Abu Bakr
- Died: August or September, 1191
- Spouse: Inanj Khatun
- Father: Eldiguz
- Religion: Sunni Islam

Muzaffar al-Din Qizil Arslan Uthman (r.1186–1191, Persian: مظفر الدین قزل ارسلان عثمان), better known as Qizil Arslan (Note: Qizil Arslan is a Turkic name, meaning "red lion".) (قزل ارسلان), was the ruler (atabeg) of the Eldiguzids from 1186 to 1191. He was the brother and successor of Muhammad Jahan Pahlavan, and was later succeeded by his nephew Nusrat al-Din Abu Bakr.

== Background ==
Qizil Arslan was the son of Eldiguz, a former Kipchak military slave of the Seljuk Empire, who rose to prominence and established the Eldiguzid dynasty, and from 1160 had managed to make the Seljuk Sultan of western Iran his puppet, thus taking control over most of western Iran. However, during the reign of his son and successor, Muhammad Jahan Pahlavan (r. 1175–1186), the dynasty was weakened and lost many of its territories, retaining only control of Azerbaijan and Arran. During this period, Qizil Arslan was in charge of Tabriz and its surroundings.

== Reign ==
Qizil Arslan ascended the throne in 1186 after Jahan Pahlavan's death, and assumed the title of al-Malik al-Mu'azzam ("the respected king"). However, Qizil Arslan immediately came in a conflict with a faction under the leadership of Jahan Pahlavan's widow Inanj Khatun who supported their two sons. Meanwhile, the Seljuk Sultan Toghrul III (r. 1176-1194), who had been figurehead under Jahan Pahlavan due to his age, freed himself from the grip of the Eldiguzids and withstood them until he was seized by Qizil Arslan's men in 1190, and shortly afterwards imprisoned.

At the same time, the central power began to get weaker as mamluks, who had strengthened their dominance in their areas, did not want to obey the Sultan. Even Shirvanshah Akhsitan I who used to be Atabegs’ liegeman attempted to intervene the interior affairs of the Eldiguzids and opposed Qizil Arslan's aspiration to the throne. In the response to this, Qizil Arslan invaded Shirvan in 1191, reached to Derbent and subordinated the whole Shirvan to his authority. In 1191 Toghrul III, the last Seljuq ruler was overthrown by Qizil Arslan.

Qizil Arslan initially declared the newborn Seljuk prince Sanjar ibn Suleiman-Shah as sultan, but then chose to declare himself as sultan. The following year, however, he was found murdered on his bed, most likely at the instigation of Inanj Khatun.

Qizil Arslan's nephew, Nusrat al-Din Abu Bakr, instantly took action after his uncle's death, and ascended the Eldiguzid throne, whilst Inanj Khatun's sons Qutluq Inanj and Ozbeg were fighting over the control of Persian Iraq against their brother Abu Bakr who requested help from Seljuk Sultan Toghrul III, who had managed to escape from imprisonment with the help of Kamal al-Din Abhari. Toghrul defeated Qutluq and Ozbeg but, after a very short time, Toghrul and Abu Bakr agreed to make peace with Qutluq and Ozbeg at the request of Inanj Khatun and the hostilities temporarily ended with Sultan Toghrul marrying Inanj.

== Court life ==
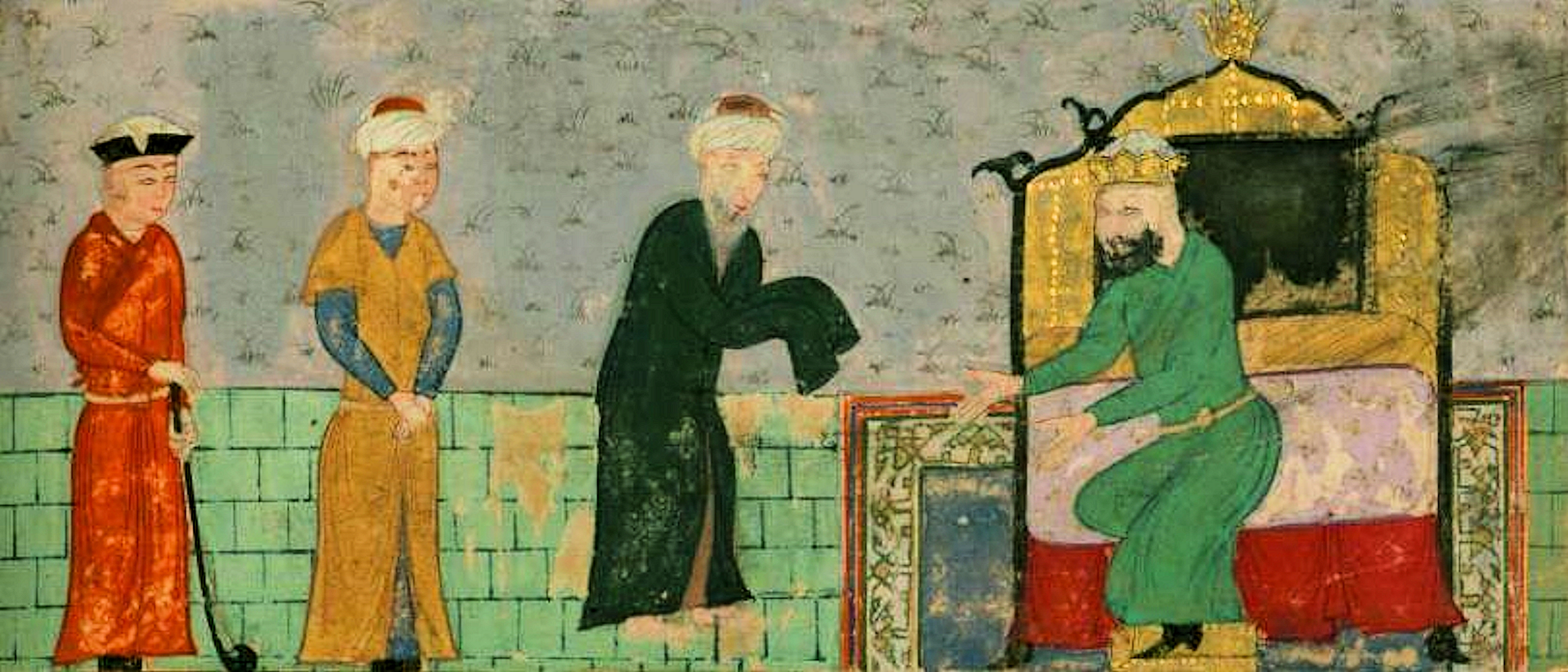
King Qizil Arslan welcomes the poet Nizami.

Like the rest of the Eldiguzids, Qizil Arslan was an advocate of Persian culture and literature. The poet Athir al-Din Akhsikati, who played a prominent role in the history of Persian poetry, replaced Mujir al-Din Baylaqani as Qizil Arslan's court poet. The prominent poet Khaqani, who had moved from Shamakhi to Tabriz, also became acquainted with Qizil Arslan, and composed poems appreciating the latter. Another poet, Nizami Ganjavi, who is considered the greatest romantic epic poet in Persian literature, dedicated his Khosrow and Shirin first to Muhammad Jahan Pahlavan, and then later to Qizil Arslan.

== Sources ==
- Bosworth, C. E. (1982). "Abharī, Kamāl-al-dīn". Encyclopaedia Iranica, Vol. I, Fasc. 2. p. 217.
- Buniyatov, Z.M. (2015). A History of The Khorezmian State under the Anushteginids 1097 – 1231. IICAS Samarkand. ISBN 978-9943-357-21-1.
- Luther, K. A. (1987). "Atābakān-e Adharbayjān". Encyclopaedia Iranica, Vol. II, Fasc. 8. pp. 890–894.
- Zardabli, Ismail bey (2014). The History of Azerbaijan: from ancient times to the present day. Lulu.com. ISBN 978-1-291-97131-6.

Regnal titles
Preceded by Muhammad Jahan Pahlavan	Eldiguzid ruler 1186–1191	Succeeded by Nusrat al-Din Abu Bakr
