= Xalxal =

Xalxal may refer to:

- Xalxal, Nakhchivan, Azerbaijan
- Xalxal, Oghuz, Azerbaijan

== See also ==
- Khalkhal (disambiguation)
