= Kamal al-Din Abhari =

Kvaja Kamal al-Din Abu Amr Abhari (Persian: خواجه کمال الدین ابو عمرو ابهری), better simply known as Kamal al-Din Abhari (کمال الدین ابهری), was a Persian vizier of the two Seljuk sultans in western Iran, Arslan-Shah (r. 1161–1176) and his son and successor Tughril III (r. 1176–1194). Kamal al-Din's nisba indicates origins from Abhar, a town in the northern part of Persian Iraq.

Kamal al-Din started his career as a secretary, and was later appointed by Arslan-Shah as his vizier. Arslan-Shah's son and successor Tughril III, later became restless under the supervision of the Eldiguzid atabegs of Azerbaijan and strived to break out of their influence, but was eventually captured and jailed by the atabeg Qizil Arslan (r. 1186–1191). Kamal al-Din later played a major role in Tughril's escape, but for an unknown reason later withdrew from politics and lived the rest of his life as an ascetic, walking around Hejaz and Syria. He died in Jerusalem in 1194.

== Sources ==
- Bosworth, C. E. (1982). "Abharī, Kamāl-al-dīn". Encyclopaedia Iranica, Vol. I, Fasc. 2. p. 217.
