= Athir al-Din Akhsikati =

Iranian poet (c. 1127–1211/12)

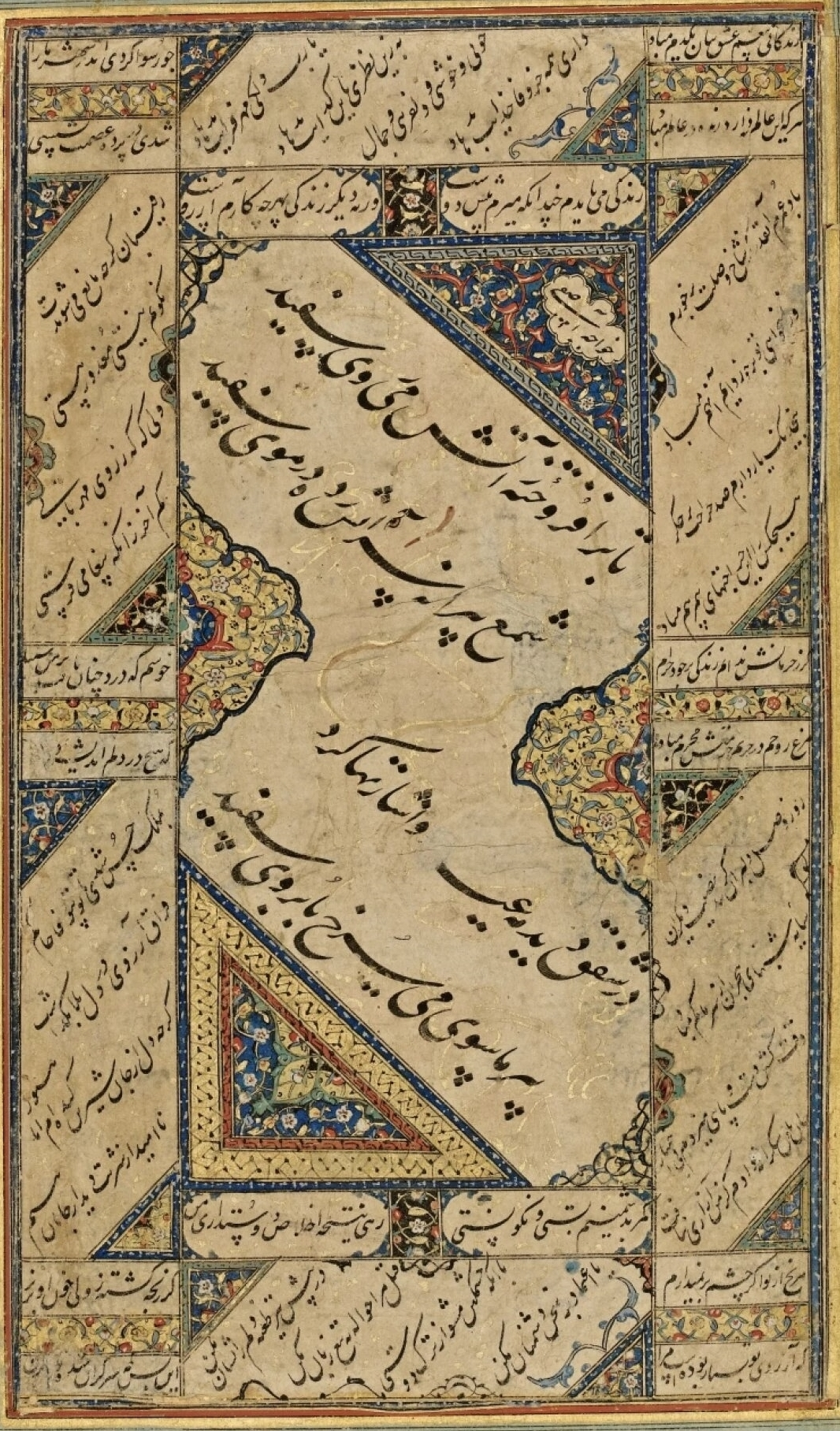
- A 16th-century page of calligraphy from an album. The poetry in the lateral panels is by Athir al-Din Akhsikati and Mohtasham Kashani
- Native name: اثیر‌الدین اخسیکتی
- Born: 1126–28 Akhsikath, Kara-Khanid Khanate
- Died: 1211/12 (aged 83–86) Khalkhal, Eldiguzid atabegate
- Notable works: Divan of Athir al-Din Akhsikati

Athir al-Din Akhsikati (Persian: اثیر‌الدین اخسیکتی; 1126–28 – 1211/12) was an Iranian writer, whose ghazals in Persian played an important role in the development of the genre.

A native of Akhsikath in Central Asia, Athir al-Din first started his career at the court of Herat, under the service of the Seljuk sultan Ahmad Sanjar (r. 1118–1157). Following the latter's death, Athir al-Din went to western Iran, where he stayed at the courts of Hamadan and Tabriz. During this period he is known to have served under the Seljuk sultans of Persian Iraq, the Eldiguzids, and a local dynast, Ala al-Dawla Fakhr al-Din Arab Shah.

Athir al-Din spent his last years in the town of Khalkhal, where he chose to live in poverty and in search for spiritual knowledge. It was there that he died in 1211 or 1212.

== Biography ==
Like most poets of this period, not much is known about Athir al-Din's life. His full name was Athir al-Din Abu'l-Fadl Muhammad ibn Abi Tahir al-Akhsikati. Of eastern Iranian background, he was born between 1126 and 1128 in Akhsikath, one of the leading cities of the Farghana Valley in Central Asia. The Farghana Valley was then under the rule of the Kara-Khanid Khanate. Athir al-Din's education started in his native Akhsikath, and was finished in Balkh, the cultural hub of the Khurasan region. He later joined the court of the Seljuk sultan Ahmad Sanjar (r. 1118–1157) in the city of Herat.

There he stayed until the death of Sanjar and the disintegration of the latter's realm in 1157. Athir al-Din went to western Iran, where he found sanctuary in the city of Hamadan in Persian Iraq. There he became a poet of the Seljuk sultan Muhammad II (r. 1153–1159). In some of his later verses, Athir al-Din claims that all his possessions were stolen during that journey, including the poetry he wrote at the court of Sanjar. Athir al-Din also spent some time at court of the city of Tabriz. The figures that are the subject of his madih (praises) are the Seljuk sultans of Persian Iraq, the Eldiguzid atabegs of Azerbaijan, or their ministers and family members.

Athir al-Din enjoyed notable support from the Seljuk sultan Arslan ibn Tughril (r. 1161–1175), the atabeg Qizil Arslan (r. 1186–1191), and a local dynast in Persian Iraq, Ala al-Dawla Fakhr al-Din Arab Shah. Qizil Arslan appointed Athir al-Din as his new court poet, replacing the distinguished poet Mujir al-Din Baylaqani (died 1191), whom Athir al-Din is known to have accused of "plundering loot from the caravan of his poetry", i.e. plagiarism. This accusation was criticized by the contemporary Muhammad ibn Ali Rawandi. Athir al-Din also fell into a conflict with another distinguished poet, Khaqani (died 1186–1199), who lived in Shamakhi and served the Shirvanshahs. He claimed to be an equal to Khaqani, which led to the two exchanging messages of insults and sarcasm. Athir al-Din reportedly even went to Shirvan to challenge Khaqani.

Athir al-Din is considered to have been part of the Kubrawiya Sufi order and a student of its founder, Najm al-Din Kubra (died 1221). Athir al-Din spent his last years in the town of Khalkhal, where he chose to live in poverty and in search for spiritual knowledge. During this period, he wrote various didactic and religious qasidas (eulogies). He died in 1211 or 1212.

== Works ==
Athir al-Din used the pen name of "Athir" in his writings. The critical edition of his divan (collection of short poems) contains 6532 verses, which consist of 4214 qasidas, 1361 ghazals, 557 qit'as, 234 tarji-bands, 142 ruba'is (quatrain), and 24 fards (single verse). The editor of the text states the original version must have consisted of at least 8000 lines.

Athir al-Din's qasidas were highly esteemed by contemporaneous literary commentators. The contemporaneous Persian writer Muhammad Aufi says that Athir al-Din's poetry "is embellished and pleasant, and has a wealth of ideas." According to Daniela Meneghini, his qasidas are equal to that of those by Khaqani and Anvari (died 1189). She adds that his ghazals, while playing an important role in the development of the genre, are still overlooked by scholars. She considers Athir al-Din to have received little analysis in scholarship, mentioning that Edward Granville Browne (died 1926) referred to him as a "a minor poet of Seljuk period," and that Jan Rypka (died 1968) said "mention of his name must suffice". However, according to Meneghini, the major tadhkiras (traditional biographies), all modern Persian histories of literature, and even some historical chronicles attest the popularity of Athir al-Din.

According to Meneghini, Athir al-Din "stands out for his rhetorical ability, particularly in the construction of figures of speech." She adds that topic of his ghazals were straightforward and of variable length, and mainly used the radif (a word or phrase that rhymes with each line of the poem).

== Sources ==
- Bosworth, C. Edmund (1999). "Farḡāna". In Yarshater, Ehsan (ed.). Encyclopædia Iranica (Online ed.). Encyclopædia Iranica Foundation.
- Meneghini, Daniela (2016). "Athīr al-Dīn Ākhsīkatī". In Fleet, Kate; Krämer, Gudrun; Matringe, Denis; Nawas, John; Rowson, Everett (eds.). Encyclopaedia of Islam (3rd ed.). Brill Online. ISSN 1873-9830.
- Rypka, Jan (1968). History of Iranian Literature. Springer Netherlands. ISBN 978-9401034814.
- Safa, Z. (1987). "Aṯīr Aḵsīkatī". In Yarshater, Ehsan (ed.). Encyclopædia Iranica. Vol. III/1: Ātaš–Awāʾel al-Maqālāt. London and New York: Routledge & Kegan Paul. p. 12. ISBN 978-0-71009-113-0.
