= Khalkhal =

Khalkhal or Khalkhāl or Khal Khal may refer to:

- Xalxal, Nakhchivan, a village in Azerbaijan
- Xalxal, Oghuz, a village and municipality in Azerbaijan
- Khalkhal County, a subdivision of Ardabil Province, Iran
- Herowabad, a city in Ardabil province, Iran
- Khalkhal, Ardabil, a town in Ardabil province, Iran
- Khal Khal, Kermanshah, a village in Kermanshah province, Iran
