= Xal =

Xal or XAL may refer to:

- xal, the ISO 639-3 language code for the Oirat language
- xal, the ISO 639 code for Kalmyk Oirat
- Xal, a traditional Kurdish tattoo
- eXtensible Application Language, the Markup language of Nexaweb's Enterprise Web 2.0 Suite

== See also ==
- Xalxal
