= Eldiguz =

Atabeg of Azerbaijan from 1136 to 1175

Shams al-Din Eldigüz
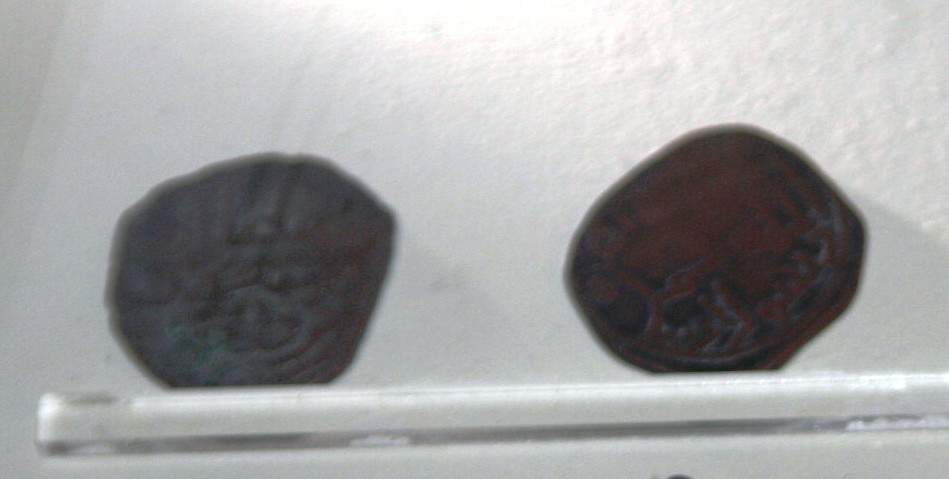
- Copper dirhams of Eldagiz; Museum of History of Azerbaijan, Baku

1st Atabeg of Azerbaijan
- Reign: 1136 – 1175
- Successor: Muhammad Jahan Pahlavan
- Died: October 1175; Nakhchivan
- Burial: Hamadan
- Spouse: Momine Khatun
- House: Eldiguzids

Shams al-Din Ildeniz, Eldigüz or Shamseddin Eldeniz (Persian: اتابک شمس‌الدین ایلدگز, died c. 1175–1176) was an atabeg of the Seljuq empire and founder of the dynasty of Eldiguzids, atabegs of Azerbaijan, which held sway over Armenia, Iranian Azerbaijan, and most of northwestern Persia from the second half of the 12th century to the early decades of the 13th.

== Life ==
A Kipchak by origin, he was formerly a freedman of Kamal al-Din al-Simirumi, the vizier of Seljuq sultan Mahmud II (1118-1131). After Simirumi's murder at the hands of Assassins in 1122, he passed to the hands of sultan, who entrusted his education to certain emir Nasr. According to Minorsky, after Mahmud's death, he attained to the post of governor of Arran and Azerbaijan under sultan Ghiyath ad-Din Mas'ud (1134–1152) in 1137, who also gave late sultan Toghrul II's widow Momine Khatun and appointed Eldigüz to be atabeg of Arslanshah (son of Toghrul) in 1161. He obtained Iranian Azerbaijan, Arran, Shirvan, Jibal, Hamadan, Gilan, Mazandaran, Isfahan and Rey. The feudal lords of Mosul, Kerman and Persia, Shirvan, Khuzistan, Ahlat, Arzan-ar-Rum and Maragha became his vassals. His rise as the most powerful peripheral emirs of the Seljuq empire was aided by the necessity of having a large army against the frequent incursions from the neighboring Kingdom of Georgia.

== Rise to power ==
Eldegiz chose Barda as his residence, and attracted the local emirs to his camp. His dynasty's powerbase was centered around Nakhchivan, from where he would direct attention to Georgia. Expanding to Arran, he gained control from Baylaqan to Shamkhor. He made himself virtually independent ruler of Azerbaijan by 1146. His marriage with Mu'mine Khatun afforded him to intervene in the dynastic strife which erupted upon Mas'ud's death in 1152. His power in Azerbaijan grew stronger when Khass Beg ibn Palang-Eri was killed on the orders of sultan Muhammad II in 1153. Eldiguz, in alliance with Ahmadili atabeg Arslan Aba waged a war against sultan and kept this alliance till 1156. Eldiguz also obtained execution of Chaghrishah, son of Mahmud II in 1155, Ganja. Alliance soon came to a conclusion when Muhammad II defeated Eldiguz in 1156 and granted Azerbaijan to Arslan Aba. Tides turned when sultan himself died in 1159 and was replaced by Suleiman Shah by Ïnanch Sonqur. He succeeded, in 1160, in deposing and possibly murdering Sulayman Shah and installing his stepson Arslanshah b. Toghrul (1160–1175) as sultan. Conferred with the rank of atabeg, Ildeniz now became a chief protector of the sultan's authority. Ildeniz then arranged a marriage between his son Pahlawan and the daughter of Inanch, amir of Rey, in order to secure the allegiance of this powerful dynasty.

== Wars against Ahmadilis and Inanch ==
Arslanshah's reign was not accepted in Maragha and Ray, whose rulers Inanch and Ahmadilis became rivals of Eldeguzids. Inanch marched against Hamadan, in order to place his brother Muhammad on the throne in 3 August 1161 but Arslan and Eldigüz defeated him in battle, forcing Ïnanch to flee. Inanch again marched on Eldugizids in 1165, this time by aid of Bavandid ruler Hasan I (who also became Inanch's son-in-law) and Khwarazmshah Il-Arslan. Eldiguz managed Inanch's assassination in 1169 and capture of Rey, which was granted to Muhammad Jahan Pahlavan as an iqta. Although never subjugated, Ahmadilis continued rivalry with Eldiguzids until Qizil Arslan's reign.

== Consolidation of power ==
Ildeniz then marched to Isfahan and forced the Salghurid atabeg of Fars, Zangi b. Mawdud, into submission. He also annexed Ardabil, which was ruled by atabeg Nasir al-Din Aq Qush until his own death on 30 September 1165. His son Jamal ad-Din Muhammad was granted Borujerd in return. Tabriz was also gained from Ahmadilis in 1174. He restored Arslan Shah II to his rule in Kerman in 1174 who took it from his brother Bahram Shah. Eldiguz consolidated his power to entire Iran with the exception of Mazandaran and Ahmadili controlled Maragheh.

== Georgian campaign ==
Soon he proceeded northward to recover the city of Dvin from the Georgian attack in 1162. A coalition of Muslim rulers - Shah-Armen Seyfettin Beytemür, Ahmadili Arslan-Aba, Arzen emir Fakhr ul-Din and Saltuk II, led by Ildeniz took the fortress of Gagi, laid waste as far as the region of Gagi and Gegharkunik, seized prisoners and booty, and then moved to Ani capturing and granting it to Shaddadid emir Shahanshah ibn Mahmud. The Muslim rulers were jubilant, and they prepared for a new campaign. However, this time they were forestalled by George III, who marched into Arran at the beginning of 1166, occupied a region extending to Ganja, devastated the land and turn back with prisoners and booty. The Shaddadids ruled Ani for about 10 years as vassals of Eldgiz, but in 1174 George III took the Shahanshah as a prisoner and occupied Ani once again, appointing Ivane Orbeli as governor.

== Khwarazmian affairs ==
Back at Hamadan, he had to deal with another invasion – this time by the Khwarezmians who planned to annex Khorasan. Its governor Muayyad Ay-Aba submitted to Eldugiz since 1157, even captured Bistam and Damghan from Khwarazmshah and defeated Shah Ghazi Rustam. However, Muayyad soon switched sides and submitted to Khwarazmshah in 1167. It was not, however, until the death of the Khwarazmshah Il-Arslan in 1172, when the threats on this sector were finally eliminated.

== Death and legacy ==
By the time of his death around October–November 1175, Ildeniz was arguably the undisputed de facto master of many parts of the already fragmentized Great Seljuq Empire, centered on Iraq. He was buried at Hamadan, at a madrasa which he had founded. He was succeeded by his sons Muhammad Jahan Pahlavan and Qizil Arslan. The Armenian author Vardan Areveltsi considered him to be benevolent towards Christians.

== Family ==
He was married to Momine Khatun, widow of Toghrul II in 1135. He had two sons and a daughter with her:

1. Muhammad Jahan Pahlavan
2. Qizil Arslan
3. A daughter
