= Tughril III =

Last sultan of the Great Seljuk Empire (r.1176–1194)

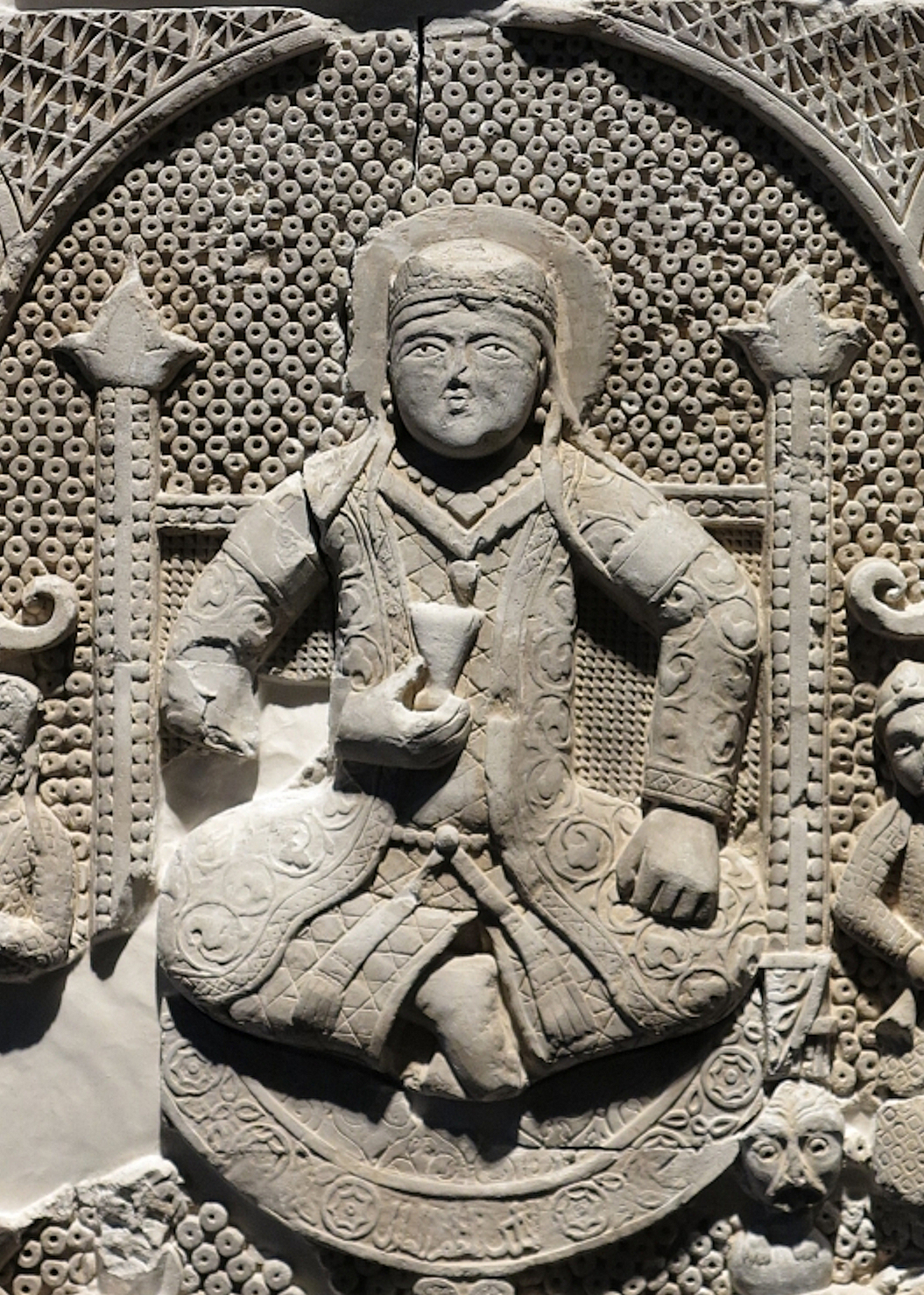
- Probable depiction of Tughril III (1176–1194), from Rayy, Iran.

Sultan of the Seljuk Empire
- Reign: 1176–1194
- Predecessor: Arslan Shah
- Successor: Office abolished
- Born: 1169?
- Died: March 19, 1194 killed near Rey
- Consort: Inanj Khatun
- Issue: Malik Berqyaruq; Alp Arslan; Shams Malika Khatun
- Father: Arslan Shah
- Religion: Sunni Islam

Tughril III (Persian: طغرل سوم) (died 1194) was the last sultan of the Seljuk Empire from 1175 until his death.

== Status of the Empire in 1160 ==
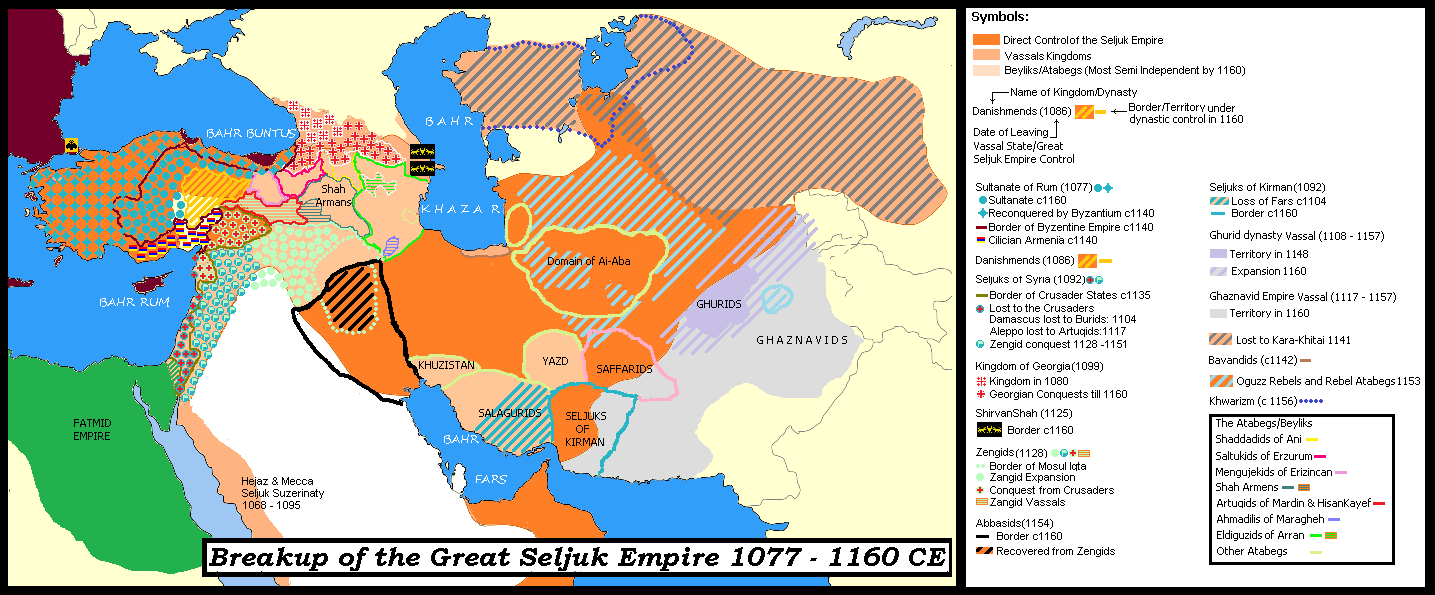
Breakup of Great Seljuk Empire 1077–1160

The Great Seljuk Empire, founded by Tughril and significantly expanded by Alp Arslan, stretched from Anatolia and Syria in the west to the Ghaznavid Empire in the east, from the Black and Caspian Sea and the Syr Darya in the north and Persian Gulf in the south. The empire had fragmented when Arslan Shah II assumed the throne in 1161. He nominally reigned over the territories in Azerbaijan, Iraq and western Persia and was dependent on the loyalty of independent Amirs like Eldiguz to enforce his authority. Atabegs like the Eldiguzids (Atabegs of Azerbaijan), Salghurids (Atabegs of Fars), Hazaraspids (Atabegs of Luristan), Atabegs of Yazd, Zengids, (Atabegs of Mosul) and Ahmadilis (Atabegs of Maragha), who were initially tutors of young Seljuk princes in their assigned iqtas, and exercised power on their behalf, ultimately took over control of the iqtas for themselves, ruled their lands independently with nominal allegiance to the Sultan, fought and allied with each other to install and depose Seljuk princes to the throne, and increased their lands at the expense of the imperial domain. Syria was lost to the Zangids, Palestine and much of Lebanon to the Crusaders, other Seljuk families controlled Anatolia, Kerman, the eastern lands were taken over by the Ghurid Empire, the Khwarazmian dynasty and the Qara Khitai after the defeat of Seljuk Sultan Ahmed Sanjar in the Battle of Qatwan in 1141 and the Oghuz rebellion in 1153.

== Reign of Arslan Shah II ==
After the murder of Sultan Suleiman-Shah in 1161, Eldiguz marched on Hamadan with an army of 20,000 cavalry and installed the 28 year old Arslan Shah II (c. 1161–1176) as the Seljuk Sultan of Iraq with the support of other Atabegs, and Eldiguzid took the title "Atabeg Al Azam (Supreme Atabeg)" and supervised the new Sultan, who now married Khatun-i-Kirmani, the widow of Sultan Muhammad II and daughter of Muhammad b. Arslan Shah I, the Seljuk Sultan of Kerman. The Sultan was a figurehead, Eldiguz commanded the army, controlled the treasury and awarded the iqta's as he saw fit along with fighting the Kingdom of Georgia when needed. He also fought other Atabegs between 1161–1175, and brought Iranian Azerbaijan, Arran, Jibal, Hamadan, Gilan, Mazandaran, Isfahan and Rey under his control. His vassals included feudal lords of Shriven, Ahlat, and Arzan-ar-Rum Arslan Shah lived in Hamadan, he was looked after by his younger half-brothers, and fathered Toghril, in 1168. Arslan Shah II did send aid to Seljuk Prince Arslan Shah b. Tughril of Kirman to battle his brother Bahram Shah in 1174, which resulted in the Seljuk Sultanate of Kirman being split in two, with Bahran Shah retaining one-third of the territory, and Arslan Shah b. Tughril received the remainder.

After death of Eldiguz in 1175, his son Nusrat al-Din Muhammad Pahlavan continued the same policy towards his half-brother Sultan Arslan Shah II, and he shifted his capital from Nakhchivan to Hamadan in western Iran. Arslan Shah resented domination of the Eldiguzids, and he raised an army with the help of discounted Amirs and marched towards Azerbaijan to confront his half-brother, but at Zinjan, he died suddenly at the age of 43, maybe a victim of poisoning, and the seven year old Tughril III was installed as Sultan at Hamadan, Jahan Pahlvan then defeated the attempt of Muhammad, the elder brother of Arslan Shah, to dethrone his nephew.

== Reign as figurehead Sultan ==
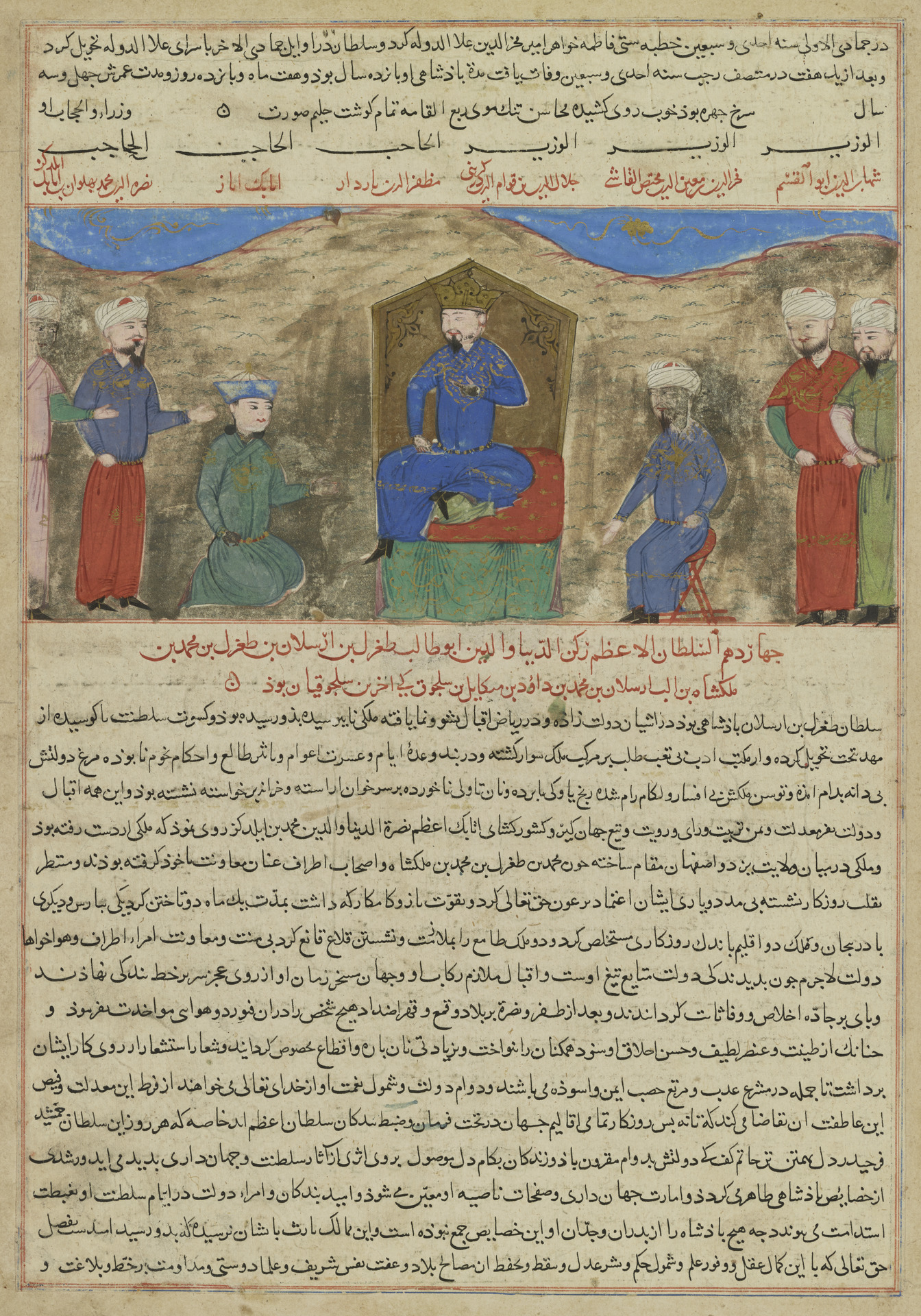
Tughril III in the Majma' al-tawarikh

Tughril III was seven years old when he began his reign, he was well treated by Jahan Pahlvan, who remained the effective ruler of the empire, with his brother Muzzafar Al-Din Qizil Arslan Uthman as his chief subordinate in Tabriz, who was also Atabeg of Nusrat al-Din Abu Bakr, one of the sons of Jahan Pahlvan. Jahan Pahlvan managed to stop the invasion of Saladin, who had advanced as far as Lake Van, but turned back when news arrived that Seyfettin Beytemür (c. 1185–1193), ruler of Akhlat had accepted the suzerainty of Muhammad Jahan Pahlavan. Problems cropped up after Jahan Pahlavan died in 1186, as he had appointed his four sons as governors, Abu Bakr ruled Azerbaijan and Arran, Ozbeg was appointed to rule Hamadan, sons of the daughter of Ïnanch Sonqur, Qutlugh Inanch Muhammad and Amir Amiran Umar ruled Rey, Isphahan and parts of Western Persia under the supervision of their uncle Qizil Arslan. They had sworn to obey Qizil Arslan and never to rebel against Tughril III. When Jahan Pahlvan died, Qizil Arslan assumed his position, which was contested by his brother's widow, Innach Khatun, who wanted her son Qutlugh Inanch Muhammad to succeed his father, as she was afraid the childless Qizil Arslan would nominate his favorite Abu Bakr as his heir, Tughril III, who resented the harsh treatment he received from Qizil Arslan, joined the rebels. This conflict possibly prevented Tughril III and Qizil Arslan from aiding Muhammad b. Bahram Shah, the last Seljuk Sultan of Kirman, who had been driven from Kirman by Oghuz rebels driven out from Khurasan in 1186.

== Events between 1187 – 1190 ==
The rebel army consisted of the forces of the Amirs of Zenjan and Maragha, the retainers of both Kamal Ai-Aba, head of the Mamluks, and of Saif al-Din Rus, husband of Innach Khatun, while Tughril himself received significant support from Turkmens, and their combined army forced Qizil Arslan to leave Hamadan after some clashes. Tughril undertook two diplomatic ventures in 1187, he journeyed to Mazandaran to request aid from Bavandid Husam al-Daula Ardashir, and received troops from him, and Tughril also sent messages to Caliph Al-Nasir, asking him to restore the palace of the Seljuk Sultan in Baghdad for him, but the Caliph razed the palace and then sent aid to Qizil Arslan, who agreed to become the Caliph's vassal. The Caliph sent an army numbering 15,000 under his vizier Jalal al-Din 'Ubaidallah b. Yunus, which attacked Hamadan in 1188 without waiting for Qizil Arslan's army to arrive, he was defeated and captured, Tughril secured victory by charging the enemy center after his right wing was battered, but this was a Pyrrhic victory, as Tughril's army suffered grievous losses in the battle. The Sultan next tried to reform his administration and coordinate strategy with available resources, but his rash behavior regarding a dispute over the command of the army, led to the execution of Kamal Ai-Aba, Saifuddin Rus and several of the Sultan's opponents, and the desertion of his allies.

Qizil Arslan had declared Sanjar b. Suleiman-Shah as the Seljuk Sultan of Iraq, and reinforced by troops sent by the Caliph now invaded Hamadan, Tughril, unable to resist the invasion, first retreated to Isphahan, then to Urmia. He was joined by an army led by his brother in law Hasan Kipchiq, and Tughril also tried to get help from the Ayyubids and the Caliph, even sent his infant son as hostage to Baghdad in a futile gesture. Tughril invaded Azerbaijan and sacked the towns of Ushnu, Khoy, Urmiya and Salmas. Qizil Arslan reconciled with his nephews and defeated and captured Tughril when he again invaded Azerbaijan in 1190. Qizli Arslan imprisoned Tughril and his son Malik Shah in Kuhran fortress near Tabriz. Qizil Arslan, encouraged by the Caliph, soon declared himself Sultan, married Innach Khatun, his brother's widow, and was poisoned by her in September, 1191. His nephews began to rule independently, and one of the Mamluks of Jahan Pahalvan, Mahmud Anas Oglu, freed Tughril III from his prison in May 1192.

== Events of 1192–1194 ==
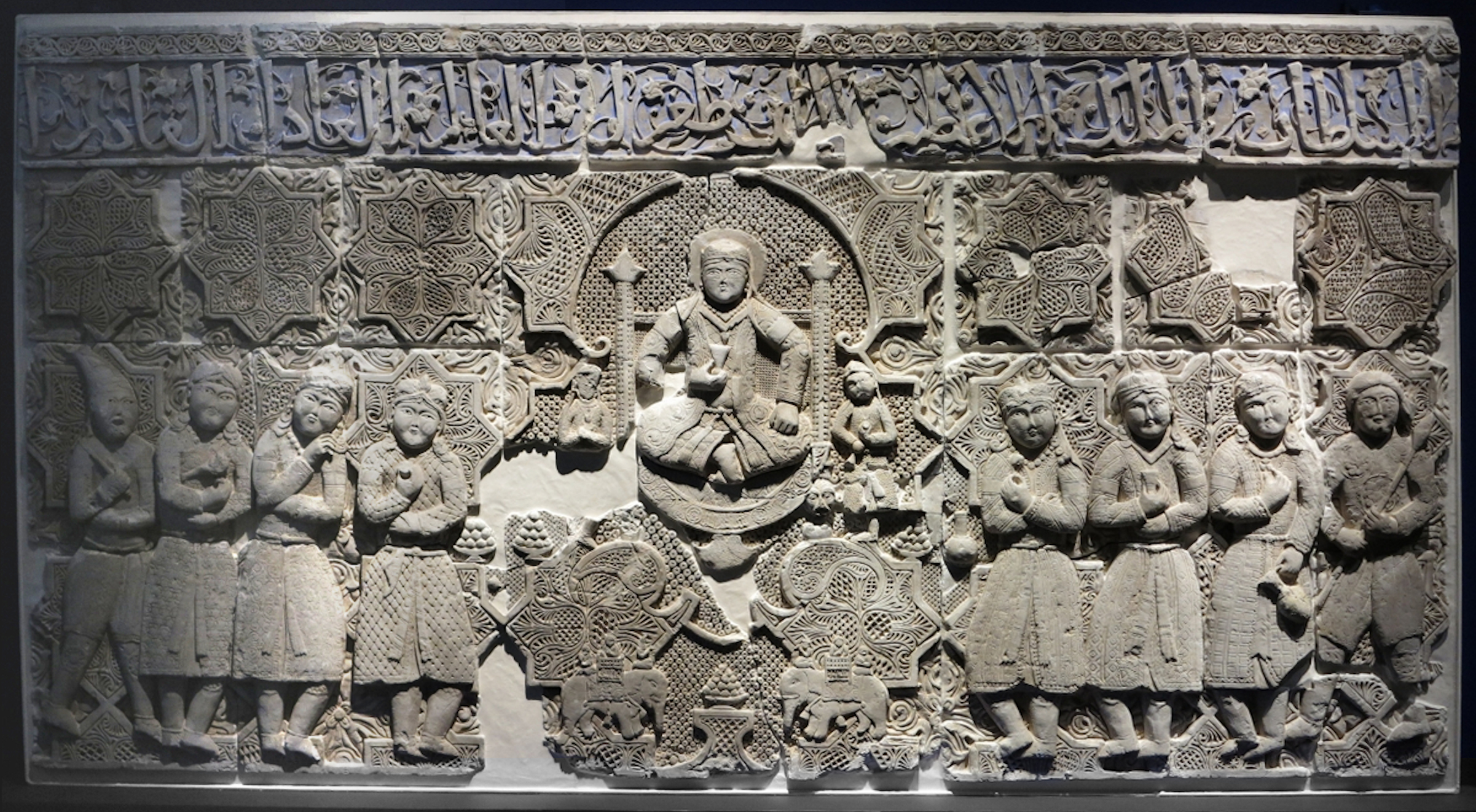
Probable depiction of Tughril III and his court.

Tughril eluded the pursuers sent by Abu Bakr and quickly assembled an army from his supporters and Turkmens, then marched east and defeated the army of Qutlugh Inanch Muhammad and Amir Amiran Umar near Qazvin on June 22, 1192, and won over a large part of the enemy soldiers after his victory. Qutlug-Inach and Amiran Omar then attacked Abu Bakr in Azerbaijan and was beaten, Aimiran Umar sought refuge with his father in law Shirvanshah Akhsitan I (c. 1160–1196), while Qutlug-Inach moved to Rey. Tughril occupied Hamadan, secured the treasury and came to rule over Isphahan and Jibal, but did not attempt to negotiate an agreement with Abu Bakr, against Qutlug Innach. Qutlugh Innach now appealed to Khwarazmshah Ala ad-Din Tekish for aid, and Tekish invaded and captured Rey in 1192, forcing Qutlug Innach to flee the city.

=== Truce with Shah Tekish ===
Sultan Tughril opened negotiations with Shah Tekish, and eventually agreed to become a vassal of Khwarizm, marriage of his daughter The Shah's son Yunus Khan, and in return Shah Tekish kept Rey, garrisoned his newly acquired territory, collected taxes, then installed Tamghach as the governor, and returned home to quell the rebellion of his brother Sultan Shah. Tughril now had the chance to negotiate with the Atabeg of Yazd, Langar ibn Wardanruz, or the Salghurid ruler of Fars, Degle ibn Zangi, both were nominally loyal to the Seljuks but no initiatives were taken to unite against their common enemy.

== Breaking the Truce ==
Tughril felt threatened with the presence of a hostile force in Rey, which was a strategic town commanding communication with Jibal and Azerbaijan was unacceptable to the Sultan. The Sultan marched towards Rey with his available forces in March 1193, defeated and killed Tamghach, captured Rey and drove out the Khrarizmian forces from the province. Tughril III next married Innach Khatun, mother of Qutlug Innach and Amirin Umar, as part of the peace agreement on her request, however, she was executed after the discovery of a plot to poison the Sultan. The Sultan returned to Hamadan, Qutlug Innach fled to Zanjan, from where he sent messages to Shah Tekish, and Caliph Al-Nasir also asked the Shah to move against Tughril. Tughril again moved east in 1194 and defeated Qutlug Innach in battle despite the presence of 7,000 Khwarazmian troops aiding Qutlug Innach. Qutlug Innach and other survivors moved east and joined up with the main Khwarizmian army led by Shah Tekish at Semnan.

== Battle of Rey ==
Sultan Tughril marched towards Rey, and on his way he received a letter from the Senior Hajib to the Khwarizm Shah Tekish, Shihab ad-Din Mas‘ud, advising the Sultan to march south to Sawa, return Rey to Khwarizm and allow Rey to be governed by the Shah's son, who would be under the suzerainty of Tughril. The Sultan discussed the proposal with his commanders, who wished to make peace, or at least wait for the reinforcements coming from Zanjan and Isfahan to bolster the army before engaging the enemy. Tughril may have also received messages from Qutlug hinting that he may defect with his following when Tughril arrived, which may have influenced the Sultan's decision. The Sultan disregarded his followers’ advice and marched to Rey. When the Khwarazmian army reached Rey on March 19, 1194, the Sultan marched past the city walls and engaged the enemy, and charged the center of the enemy vanguard. Only sixty of his personal guard followed him, the rest of his army stood off as their commanders did not believe they could win and did not wish to die for a lost cause. The Sultan was wounded in the eye by an arrow and fell from his horse, Qutlug Innach personally beheaded the 25 year old Sultan despite his plea to spare his life. Shah Ala ad-Din Tekish sent Tughril's head to the Caliph Al-Nasir who displayed it at the Nubi Gate in front of his palace, while his body was hanged at Rey. The Empire that had been founded by his namesake and ancestor Tughril ended with his death, the titles and domains of Seljuk Sultan of Iraq and Great Seljuk Sultan went extinct, and his domain became part of the Khwarazmian Empire.

== Legacy ==
Tughril was seven years old when he came to the throne, and being disgruntled with the harsh treatment of Qizil Arslan, availed the first opportunity at the age of 19 to break the Eldiguzid shackles and become the first Seljuk ruler after Sultan Muhammad II ibn Mahmud who tried to assert direct rule over his domain. His resources were limited to the Amirs who rallied to him, the domain Jibal was comparatively poor, and the Atabegs of Fars and Yazd, nominally loyal to the throne, never came to his aid. The Sultan faced tough odds as he literally was surrounded by enemies and the Atabegs were not willing to support a strong Sultan, having installed and deposed figurehead Sultans at will since the death of Ghiyath ad-Din Mas'ud. The young Sultan needed exceptional military and diplomatic skills to meet this impossible challenge, but opinion on him is divided. While some hold him as a noble, virtuous warrior, possessing the spirit of his great ancestors, struggling against impossible odds, others had painted him as "rash, wilful, proud and bloodthirsty". His arbitrary behavior led the desertion of his allies and imprisonment in 1190, and his disregard of subordinate Amir Nur ad-Din Qara and his fellow Amirs, who wanted the Sultan to either make peace or wait for reinforcement, led to his death.

Tughril's contemporaries characterized him as a devout Muslim, Nīshāpūrī, praised him for his "perfect judgment," "personal chastity," and "love of the 'ulama". This positive assessment is considered credible because a later author, Abū Hamid Muhammad b. Ibrāhīm, wrote an addendum eight years after the end of Tughril's reign and the Seljuq dynasty, and offered a similar evaluation.

Abū Hamid describes Tughril as a king who ruled with "justice and good policy," and was a "friend of the 'alim and protector of the darvish without limit". This is notable because Tughril's reign was very brief, and his opportunities to demonstrate his personal piety were limited. The sources mention his devotion was also noted by others. Al-Husaynī's chronicle also corroborates the description of Tughril's justice. His piety and love for the religious clerics stand in contrast to some of his predecessors in the later generations of Seljuq rulers, who were often described as being interested in hunting, drinking, or promiscuity.

== Family ==
One of his wives was the sister of Izz al-Din Hasan Qipchaq, one of the powerful amirs of the time. They married in 1188–9. Another wife was Inanj Khatun. She was the daughter of Amir Ïnanch Sonqur, the governor of Ray. She was the widow of Qizil Arslan and before that of Muhammad Jahan Pahlavan. She died in September–October 1192. Tughril and at least two sons and two daughters. Malik Berqyaruq and his brother Alp Arslan were taken as hostages to Gurganj, and they were executed on the order of Terken Khatun, mother of Shah Ala ad-Din Muhammad II in 1220 to prevent their falling in the hands of the Mongols. One of his daughters married Yunus Khan, son of Ala al-Din Tekish, Shah of Khwarazmian Empire. Another daughter, Shams Malika Khatun, was first married to Ozbeg, youngest son of Muhammad Jahan Pahlavan and future Atabeg of Azerbaijan. After she had been divorced from him, she married Jalal al-Din Mangburni in 1225, and her former husband died of grief.

== Sources ==
- Boyle, J. A., ed. (1968). The Cambridge History of Iran, Volume 5. Cambridge University Press. ISBN 978-0-521-06936-6.
- Bregel, Yuri (2003). A Historical Atlas of Central Asia. Brill, Boston. ISBN 90-04-12321-0.
- Buniyatov, Z.M. (2015). A History of The Khorezmian State under the Anushteginids 1097 – 1231. IICAS Samarkand. ISBN 978-9943-357-21-1.
- Grousset, Rene (2005). The Empire of The Steppes: A History of Central Asia. Rutgers University Press. ISBN 0-8135-0627-1.
- Hitti, Philip K. (1970). History of The Arabs (10th ed.). The Mcmillan Press Ltd., London. ISBN 0-333-09871-4.
- Minorsky, Vladimir (1953). Studies in Caucasian History. Taylor’s Foreign Press.
- Peacock, A.C.S.; Yıldız, Sara Nur, eds. (2013). The Seljuks of Anatolia: Court and Society in the Medieval Middle East. I.B.Tauris. ISBN 978-1848858879.
- Zaporozhets, V. M (2012). The Seljuks. Döring, Hanover. ISBN 978-3925268441.
- Zardabli, Ismail B. (2014). The History of Azerbaijan. Rossendale Books, London. ISBN 978-1-291-97131-6.
