= Muzaffar al-Din Uzbek =

Eldiguzid ruler (1210 to 1225)

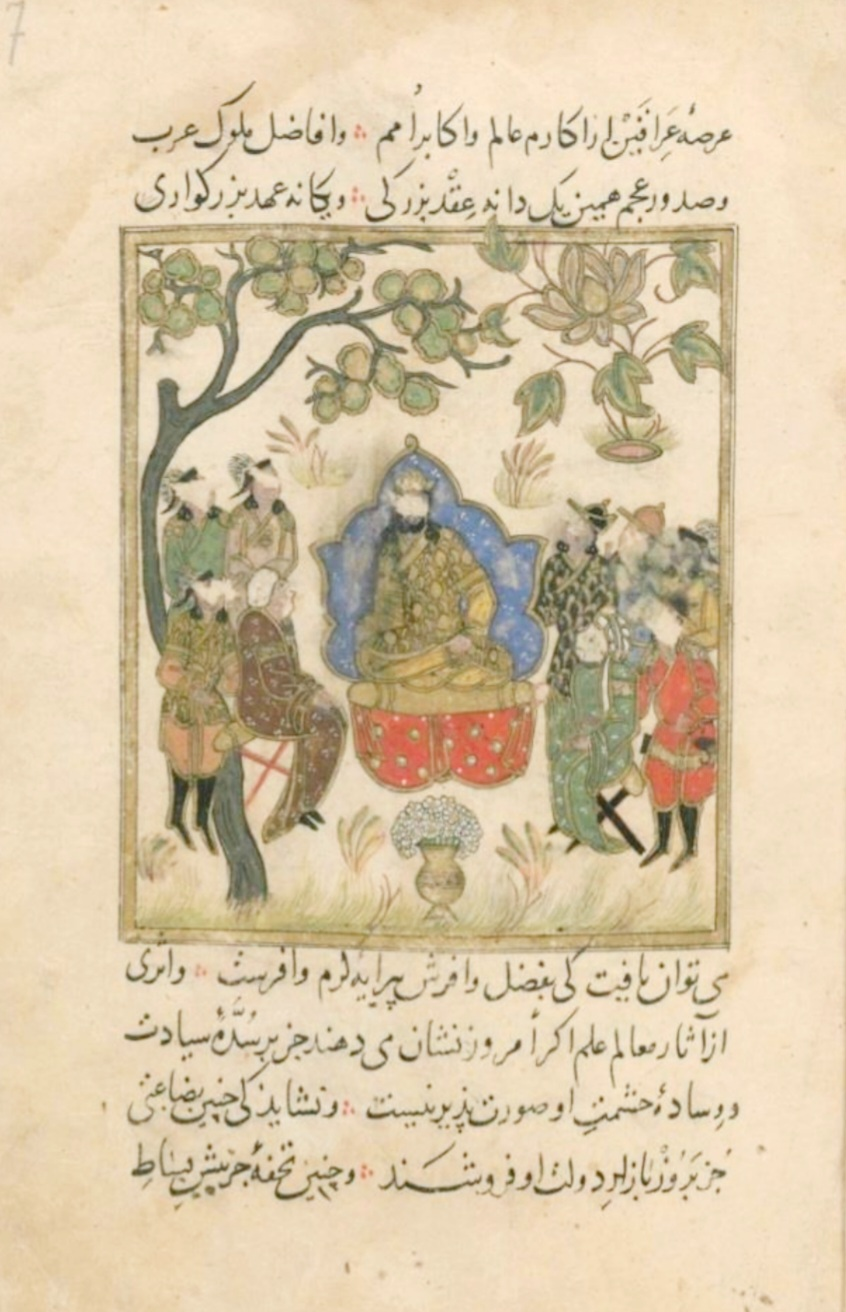
- Court Scene, Possibly Representing Muzaffar al-Din Uzbek, from a Manuscript of Marzban-nama, Baghdad, Ilkhanid Persia (1299 AD).

Last Atabeg of the Eldiguzids
- Reign: 1210 – 1225
- Predecessor: Nusrat al-Din Abu Bakr
- Successor: None (position abolished)
- Died: 1225; Alinja Tower
- Spouse: Malika Khatun
Names
- Ozbeg ibn Muhammad Pahlawan Muzaffar al-Din Uzbek
- Father: Muhammad Jahan Pahlavan
- Religion: Sunni Islam

Muzaffar al-Din Uzbek, also known as Ozbeg ibn Muhammad Pahlawan (died 1225) was the fifth and last ruler (atabeg) of the Eldiguzids from 1210 to 1225, during the later Seljuk and Khwarazmian periods. He was married to Malika Khatun, daughter of Toghrul III, the last sultan of the Seljuk Empire.

== Early career ==
He was born to Muhammad Jahan Pahlavan and Zahida Khatun. In his youth, he ruled Hamadan as his half-brother Nusrat al-Din Abu Bakr's subordinate and a vassal of Khwarazmshah Tekish in 1195. His powers were largely curbed by powerful emirs such as Mu'ayyid al-Din Ai-Aba, who became is trustee.

== Reign ==
Uzbek succeeded his half-brother in 1210 and met a rebellion from one of his mamelukes - Nasir al-Din Mengli. He defeated another one of Uzbeg's mamelukes Aytoghmish in January 1212 and seized Isfahan, Hamadan, Ray and neighboring regions (i.e. Persian Iraq). Forging a coalition against this new powerful rebel, Uzbek brought Caliph Al-Nasir and Hassan III of Alamut together and defeated Mengli in September 1215. Uzbek's new subordinate emir Aghlamish in Persian Iraq expressed his submission to Muhammad II of Khwarazm but was assassinated in 1217. Using opportunity, Uzbek captured Isfahan, while Salghurid Sa'd I ibn Zangi (1198–1226) captured rest.

Having heard of emir's death while in Samarqand, Khwarazmshah took his army to attack Salghurids and achieved its submission. Uzbek's vizier Rabib ad-Din Dandan advised him to bolster his position at the castle Farrazin, but Uzbek refused. He ordered his subordinate and ruler of Ahar, Nusrat ad-Din Pishkin, to escort him to Tabriz with his army and supplies, and he concealed himself in the inaccessible mountains of Azerbaijan with 200 faithful ghulams. However, the Khwarazmshah's army seized Nusrat ad-Din at Miyaneh, beat him utterly, confiscated all of Uzbek's valuables, and captured his vizier Dandan. Later he had to come to terms with Muhammad II and accepted Khwarazmshah as his overlord.

Uzbek later requested aid from Muhammad because of growing power of Tamar of Georgia. Under Tamar, Georgians attacked Nakhchivan, unable to capture the city, headed towards Julfa, crossed the Dareduz valley and went south to raid Marand, Tabriz, Miyana, Zanjan, Qazvin, Ardabil and other cities.

He fled to Nakhchivan in 1220 during campaign of Jebe and Subutai. Özbeg returned in 1222 but had to switch allegiance to Mongols. His deaf-mute son Khamush, the governor of Nakhchivan also submitted to Mongols. As the result, his former nominal overlord Muhammad's son Qiyath ad-Din Pir-Shah invaded Azerbaijan in 1224. Atabeg submitted again and wed his sister Jalaliyya to Pirshah as part of peace agreement, as well as taking Nakhchivan.

After receiving a request from Maragha, who complained about Malika Khatun's usurpation of power in the country, Jalal al-Din Mangburni occupied Maragha in May 1225 and took it from Uzbek's daughter-in-law Sulafa Khatun. However, people of Tabriz resisted and killed Khwarazmshah soldiers, which enraged the sultan. Siege started on 18 July and ended on 25 July, Uzbek already retreated to Ganja when Jalal al-Din captured Maragha. His wife Malika Khatun was recognized as ruler of Khoy by the sultan. Jalal al-Din later forcibly married Malika, meanwhile her marriage to Atabek was annulled due to falsified evidence. Malika further received Salmas and Urmia as her personal appanage from her new husband.

When Jalal al-Din moved against Ganja in 1225, his governor Jalal ad-Din al-Qumi turned the city over to Khwarazmshah's commander Orkhan, which caused Uzbek to flee to fortress of Alinja in Nakhchivan. Uzbek died several days later, after hearing the news of his wife's marriage to the sultan.

== Succession ==
He was succeeded by his sister Jalaliyya in Nakhchivan who was allied to Uzbek's former emirs Beklik as-Sadidi, Sayf al-Din Sunqurja and Nasir al-Din Akkush, as well as her former sister-in-law Malika Khatun, who according to Jalal al-Din's biographer Shihab al-Din Muhammad al-Nasawi, tried to "restore the dynasty of Atabeks", trying to free Uzbek's deaf-mute son Khamush from imprisonment in Khoy. He was declared atabeg with the title Qizil Arslan Khamush. Jalaliyya defeated Jalal al-Din's vizier Sharaf al-Mulk's army in 1227 and forced him to retreat to Shamiran. Another emir of Uzbek Izz ad-Din Balban al-Khalkhali rebelled against Khwarazmshahs and captured Khalkhal in 1228. However, Jalal al-Din eventually prevailed over rebels, crushing their opposition. Khamush later joined Jalal al-Din in Ganja and after his defeat in 1230 joined Muhammad III of Alamut. Khamush was married to Ahmadili princess Sulafa Khatun.

According to Tarikh-i Jahangushay, Uzbek's grandson through Khamush, Nusrat al-Din fled to Sultanate of Rum but returned to Nakhchivan and was appointed as tümen commander of Azerbaijan by Möngke Khaqan.

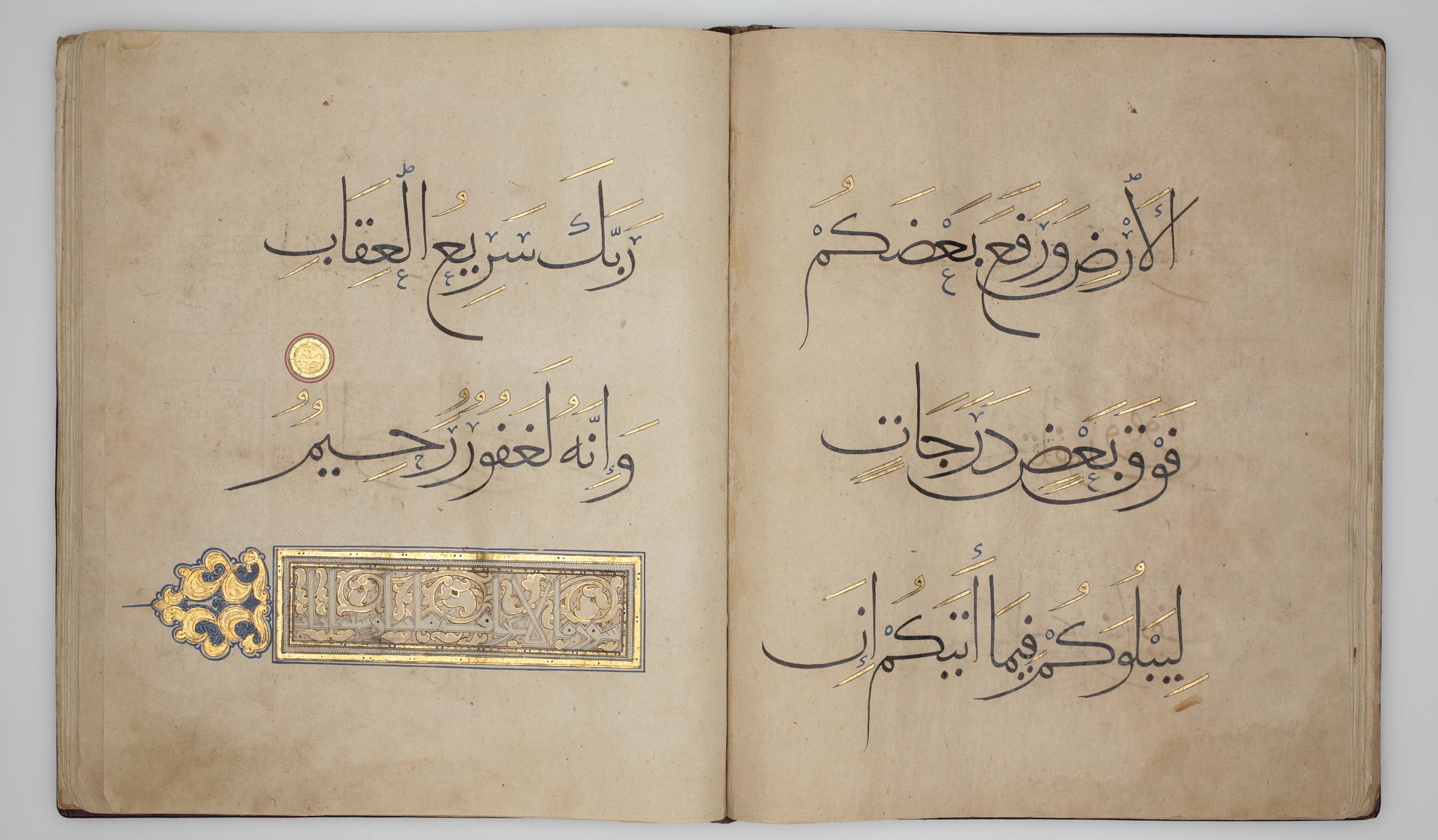
Double-page from the Qur'an dedicated to Abu’l-Qasim Harun ibn ‘Ali ibn Zafar, the vizier of Muzaffar al-Din Uzbek. Khalili Collection of Islamic Art

== Legacy ==
According to C. E. Bosworth, Ozbeg is harshly criticised by chroniclers for his laziness and fondness of opulent life, although he fought formidable opponents in the Georgians, Khwarazmians, and Mongols. His court was known as a center for art and letters, and his vizier Rabib al-Dawla was a well-known patron of poets.

== Sources ==
- Bosworth, C.E. (1995). "Özbeg b. Muḥammad Pahlawān". In Bosworth, C. E.; van Donzel, E.; Heinrichs, W. P. & Lecomte, G. (eds.). The Encyclopaedia of Islam, Second Edition. Volume VIII: Ned–Sam. Leiden: E. J. Brill. ISBN 978-90-04-09834-3.
- Luther, K. A. (1987). "Atābakān-e Adharbayjān". In Yarshater, Ehsan (ed.). Encyclopædia Iranica. Vol. II/8: Aśoka IV–Āṯār al-Wozarāʾ. London and New York: Routledge & Kegan Paul. pp. 890–894. ISBN 978-0-71009-108-6.
- Buniyatov, Z.M. (2015). Mustafayev, Shahin; Welsford, Thomas (eds.). A History of the Khorezmian State under the Anushteginids, 1097-1231. Samarkand: The International Institute for Central Asian Studies (IICAS). ISBN 978-9943-357-21-1.

Regnal titles
| Preceded by Nusrat al-Din Abu Bakr | Eldiguzid ruler 1210–1225 | Succeeded by Office abolished |
