= Ibn Khosrov al-Ustad =

Abu Bakr Ibn Khosrov al-Ustad was an author living in Ganja in the middle of the 12th century. It is known that he was a private tutor for Muhammed Jahan Pehlevan, one of the Atabegs of Azerbaijan.

His only surviving work is Munis Name (A Book of Bead stories), which is reminiscent by its style to The Book of One Thousand and One Nights. The manuscript is contained in the British Library, which acquired it in 1920. Certain Meredith-Owens translated the manuscript into English and published it in 1974.
