= Battle of Shamkor =

1195 battle

- Part of Georgian–Seljuk wars
Date	June 1, 1195
Location	Near Shamkor (present-day Shamkir, Azerbaijan) 40°49′47″N 46°01′08″E
Result	Georgian victory

Belligerents
Kingdom of Georgia; Shirvanshahs	Eldiguzids

Commanders and leaders
David Soslan	Abu Bakr

Strength
60,000	80,000

Casualties and losses
Unknown	Unknown

Battle of Shamkor (Georgian: შამქორის ბრძოლა) was fought on June 1, 1195, near the city of Shamkor, Arran. The battle was a major victory won by the Georgian army, commanded by David Soslan, over the army of the Eldiguzid ruler of Nusrat al-Din Abu Bakr.

The battle was fought as part of several conflicts between the "Atabegs of Azerbaijan", also known as the Eldiguzids after its ruling dynasty, and Kingdom of Georgia. The consolidation of Eldiguzid power, in the 1130s, coincided with a resurgence of military expansionism by the Georgian kings, whose territories intersected with Muslim Shirvan and Arran.

== Background ==
The battle was preceded by a dynastic war (1191–1195) in the Eldiguzid possessions. Victorious in power struggle, Abu Bakr "Jahan-pahlavan" (c.1195-1210) had his elder brother Qutluq Inandj assassinated and forced the younger brother, Amir Mihran, to take refuge at the court of the latter's brother-in-law, Shirvanshah Akhsitan I (c.1160-1196). The Shirvanshah together with Amir Mihran headed for Tbilisi, the capital of Kingdom of Georgia, and appealed for help to Queen Tamar of Georgia, an official protector of Shirvan. Received with great honors at the Georgian court, they were given desired support, and the Georgian army led by Consort David Soslan marched to Shirvan.

== Battle ==
Abu-Bakr, reinforced by his client Muslim emirs, met the enemy at the well-fortified city of Shamkor on June 1, 1195. David Soslan sent a relatively small force to break through the gates of the city, while he led the main Georgian troops to raid deep in the enemy's rear. However, poor roads and difficult landscape were setback for the Georgians, and the Atabeg defended the city for a while. Nevertheless, David Soslan's maneuver proved to be decisive and Abu Bakr's army was severely defeated. Shamkor was eventually captured by the Georgians who then chased the enemy's soldiers up to the city of Ganja which in its turn fell to the victors.

== Aftermath ==
The Georgians seized numerous prisoners and huge amount of booty, including the Caliph's standard, which Queen Tamar donated to the Khakhuli Monastery. After taking over the Shamkor fortress, David Soslan headed towards Ganja. When he approached the city, the noblemen, merchants, the qadi (Muslim judge) and the scientists met him. They opened the gate, spread the gold-brocaded carpets up to the door of Sultan's palace. David entered the palace, set on the sultan's throne, summoned the assembly, arranged the feast “proper for the time and day”. Shamkor and the surroundings were turned over to the Shirvanshah Amir Mihran on terms of vassalage. Abu Bakr was able to return to his capital, from where he had his brother Amir Mihran poisoned.

== See also ==
- List of Georgian battles
- History of Georgia
- History of Azerbaijan
