= Khal Khal, Kermanshah =

Khal Khal خلخال
- Village
- Location within Iran
- Coordinates: 34°16′49″N 47°20′46″E
- Country: Iran
- Province: Kermanshah
- County: Kermanshah
- Bakhsh: Central
- Rural District: Dorudfaraman

Population (2006)
  - Total: 120
- Time zone: UTC+3:30 (IRST)
  - Summer (DST): UTC+4:30 (IRDT)

Khal Khal (Persian: خلخال, also Romanized as Khāl Khāl) is a village in Dorudfaraman Rural District, in the Central District of Kermanshah County, Kermanshah Province, Iran. At the 2006 census, its population was 120, in 23 families.

According to Vladimir Minorsky, the name of this village may indicate a connection with the ancient Kharkhar kingdom, which existed somewhere in the eastern Zagros Mountains in Neo-Assyrian times.
