= Khass Beg ibn Palang-Eri =

Khass Beg ibn Palang-Eri (also spelled Khassbeg; died April/May 1153) was a Turkmen amir (commander) of the Seljuk sultanate of Iraq, who dominated the sultanate in the 1140s.

According to an expanded version of the Saljuq-nama, Khass Beg grew up with a group of Turkmens who had their summer pastures on Mount Sabalan, in the eastern part of Azerbaijan, and their winter pastures most likely in Mughan or Arran, in the South Caucasus.

Following the death of the Seljuk sultan Ghiyath ad-Din Mas'ud (r. 1134–1152) in 1152, Khass conducted the succession in Hamadan, successfully making Malik-Shah III (r. 1152–1153) acknowledged as the new sultan. After three months, however, Khass Beg had Malik-Shah III replaced with his brother Muhammad II ibn Mahmud (r. 1153–1159). When Muhammad II reached Hamadan, he had Khass Beg killed by amirs who envied his ascendancy.

== Sources ==
- Durand-Guédy, David (2020). "Khāṣṣ Beg b. Palang-Eri". In Fleet, Kate; Krämer, Gudrun; Matringe, Denis; Nawas, John; Rowson, Everett (eds.). Encyclopaedia of Islam (3rd ed.). Brill Online. ISSN 1873-9830.
- Peacock, A. C. S. (2015). The Great Seljuk Empire. Edinburgh University Press. ISBN 978-0-7486-3826-0.
