= Muhammad Jahan Pahlavan =

Atabeg of the Eldiguzids

Muhammad Jahan-Pahlavan

Atabeg
- Reign: 1175– 1186
- Predecessor: Eldiguz
- Successor: Qizil Arslan
- Father: Eldiguz
- Religion: Sunni Islam

Nusrat al-Din Muhammad ibn Ildeniz (Persian: نصرت الدین محمد بن ایل دنیز), better known as Muhammad Jahan-Pahlavan (محمد جهان پهلوان, "Muhammad, the champion of the world"), was the ruler (atabeg) of the Eldiguzids from 1175 to 1186. He was the son and successor of Eldiguz, and was later succeeded by his brother Qizil Arslan.

== Life ==
After the death of Shams al-Din Eldiguz, in 1175, the Seljuq Sultan Arslan Shah tried to escape from the yoke of the Grand Atabeg of Azerbaijan but failed, and was poisoned to death by Shams ad-Din's son, the new Grand Atabeg Muhammad Jahan Pahlavan (c. 1174–1186). Pahlavan transferred his capital from Nakhchivan to Hamadan in western Iran, and made his younger brother, Qizil Arslan Uthman, the ruler of Azerbaijan. In 1174, Qizil Arslan captured Tabriz, which subsequently became his capital.

Arslanshah marched to Azerbaijan together with the emirs against the Eldeniz government, but Muhammad Jahan Pahlavan eliminated his rival and replaced him with his son Togrul III and proclaimed himself as Toghrul’s atabeg.

Jahan Pahlavan suppressed all rebellious emirs and appointed faithful mamluks to key positions. He apportioned each of them any region or town as Iqta. According to Ravandi, the twelve years of his rule are considered the most peaceful period of the state's existence. “During his rule, Georgians made peace with him and accepted his demands”. After a while, Atabeg established friendly relations with Khwarazm Shah Tekish (1172-1200). During his reign, Caliph al-Mustadi and Caliph al-Nasir were unable to interfere in the internal affairs of the state. Under his reign the central power was strengthened and no

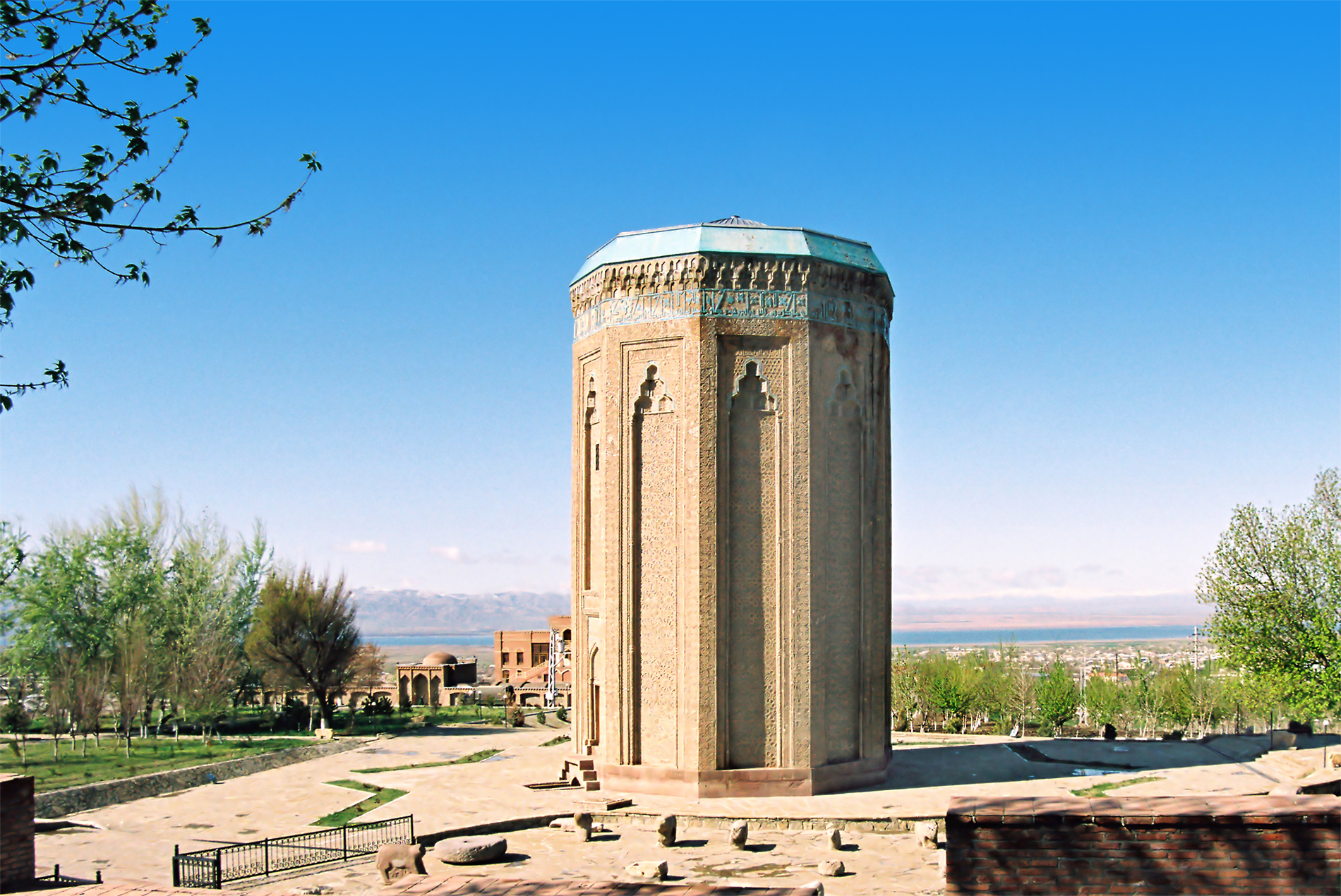
Momine Khatun Mausoleum was commissioned by Eldiguzid Atabeg Jahan Pahlawan in honor of his mother, Mu'mine Khatun

foreign enemy invaded the territory belonging to the Atabegs. He repeatedly defeated the Georgians who attacked Azerbaijan. Friendly relations with Khwarazm Shahs, the rulers of Central Asia, were founded. All those facts had positive influence on the development of science, handicraft, trade and arts.

Muhammad Jahan Pahlavan entrusted the management of Azerbaijan and Arran to his son Nusrat al-Din Abu Bakr and made Qizil Arslan his governor. Besides, he gave Rey, Isfahan and the rest of Iraq to his sons, Kutluq Inanj Mahmud and Amir Amiran Omar, and Hamadan to Uzbek.

After the death of her father, he continued the construction of the Momine Khatun Mausoleum. It is believed that Muhammad Jahan Pahlavan, who built the Nakhchivan madrasa, also built the Atabeylar Mosque or Juma Mosque.

== Sources ==
- Luther, K. A. (1987). "Atābakān-e Adharbayjān". Encyclopaedia Iranica, Vol. II, Fasc. 8. pp. 890–894.

Regnal titles
Preceded by Eldiguz	Eldiguzid ruler 1175–1186	Succeeded by Qizil Arslan
