= Mujir al-Din Baylaqani =

Mujir al-Din Baylaqani (also spelled Bailaqani; Persian: مجیرالدین بیلقانی; died 1197/98) was a Persian poet of the 12th-century.

As implied by his nisba, Baylaqani was from Baylaqan, a town in Arran. During the 12th-century, Baylaqan served as a frontier between the sphere of influence of the Shirvanshahs, Georgians, Seljuks and Eldiguzids. During this period, the Caucasus region was inhabited by different ethnic groups, as demonstrated by Baylaqani's maternal side, which was Armenian.

== Sources ==
- Beelaert, Anna Livia (2014). "Mojir-al-Din Baylaqāni". Encyclopaedia Iranica.
- Blois, Francois de (2004). Persian Literature - A Bio-Bibliographical Survey: Poetry of the Pre-Mongol Period (Volume V). Routledge. ISBN 978-0947593476.
- Lornejad, Siavash; Doostzadeh, Ali (2012). Arakelova, Victoria; Asatrian, Garnik (eds.). On the modern politicization of the Persian poet Nezami Ganjavi (PDF). Caucasian Centre for Iranian Studies.
- Meneghini, Daniela (2016). "Athīr al-Dīn Ākhsīkatī". In Fleet, Kate; Krämer, Gudrun; Matringe, Denis; Nawas, John; Rowson, Everett (eds.). Encyclopaedia of Islam (3rd ed.). Brill Online. ISSN 1873-9830.
- Rypka, Jan (1968). History of Iranian Literature. Springer Netherlands. ISBN 978-9401034814.
- Safa, Z. (1987). "Aṯīr Aḵsīkatī". In Yarshater, Ehsan (ed.). Encyclopædia Iranica. Vol. III/1: Ātaš–Awāʾel al-Maqālāt. London and New York: Routledge & Kegan Paul. p. 12. ISBN 978-0-71009-113-0.
