= Xalxal, Oghuz =

Xalxal
- Municipality
- Location within Azerbaijan Location within Shaki-Zagatala Economic Region
- Coordinates: 41°05′01″N 47°32′15″E
- Country: Azerbaijan
- Rayon: Oghuz

Population
  - Total: 767
- Time zone: UTC+4 (AZT)
  - Summer (DST): UTC+5 (AZT)

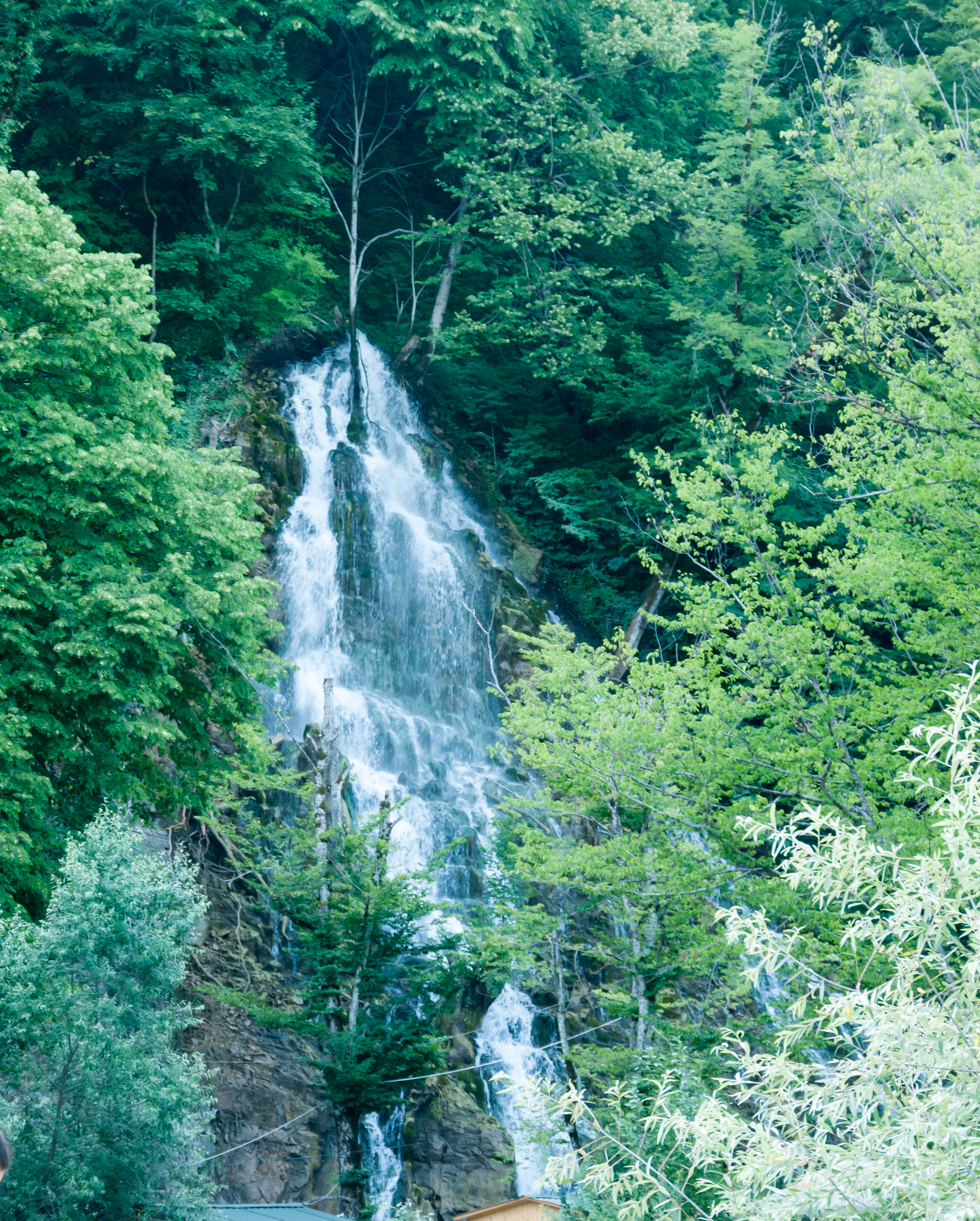
Waterfall in Xalxal

Xalxal' (also spelled as Khalkhal) is the Lezgin village and municipality in the Oghuz Rayon of Azerbaijan. It has a population of 767.
