= Xalxal, Nakhchivan =

Xalxal
- Municipality
- Location within Azerbaijan
- Coordinates: 39°19′54″N 45°27′25″E
- Country: Azerbaijan
- Autonomous republic: Nakhchivan
- District: Babek

Population (2005)
  - Total: 568
- Time zone: UTC+4 (AZT)

Xalxal (also spelled as Xal-xal and Khalkhal) is a village and municipality in the Babek District of Nakhchivan, Azerbaijan. It is located 19 km in the north from the district center, on the left bank of the Nakhchivanchay River, on the foothill area. Its population is busy with gardening, grain-growing, poultry and animal husbandry. There are secondary school, library, club, mosque and a medical center in the village. It has a population of 568.

== Etymology ==
In the ancient sources, the name of the Xalxal (Khalkhal) city (the ruins of the city is located in the territory of the Yuxarı Əskipara (Upper Askipara) village of the Qazakh District), the winter residence of ruler of the Albania (Caucasian) is mentioned about the events of the fifth century. In the Iran are exist the Khalkhal city, the neighborhood of Khalkhal and the Khalkhal Kuchek settlement. In the nineteenth century, in the Erivan Province have been registered the two mountains called Xalxallı (Khalkhally), and the mountain Xalxal (Khalkhal) in the Georgia. According to researchers, the toponym is related with the word of Xalxal which use in dialects of the Azerbaijan as the meaning of the "a place which surrounded with the fence to keep the cattle in the open air". Vladimir Minorsky also suggested that the name may indicate a connection with the ancient Kharkhar kingdom, which existed somewhere in the eastern Zagros Mountains in Neo-Assyrian times.
