= Nusrat al-Din Abu Bakr =

Eldiguzid ruler (1191 to 1210)

- Jahan-pahlavan; Malik al-Mu'azzam; Shahanshah al-A'zam
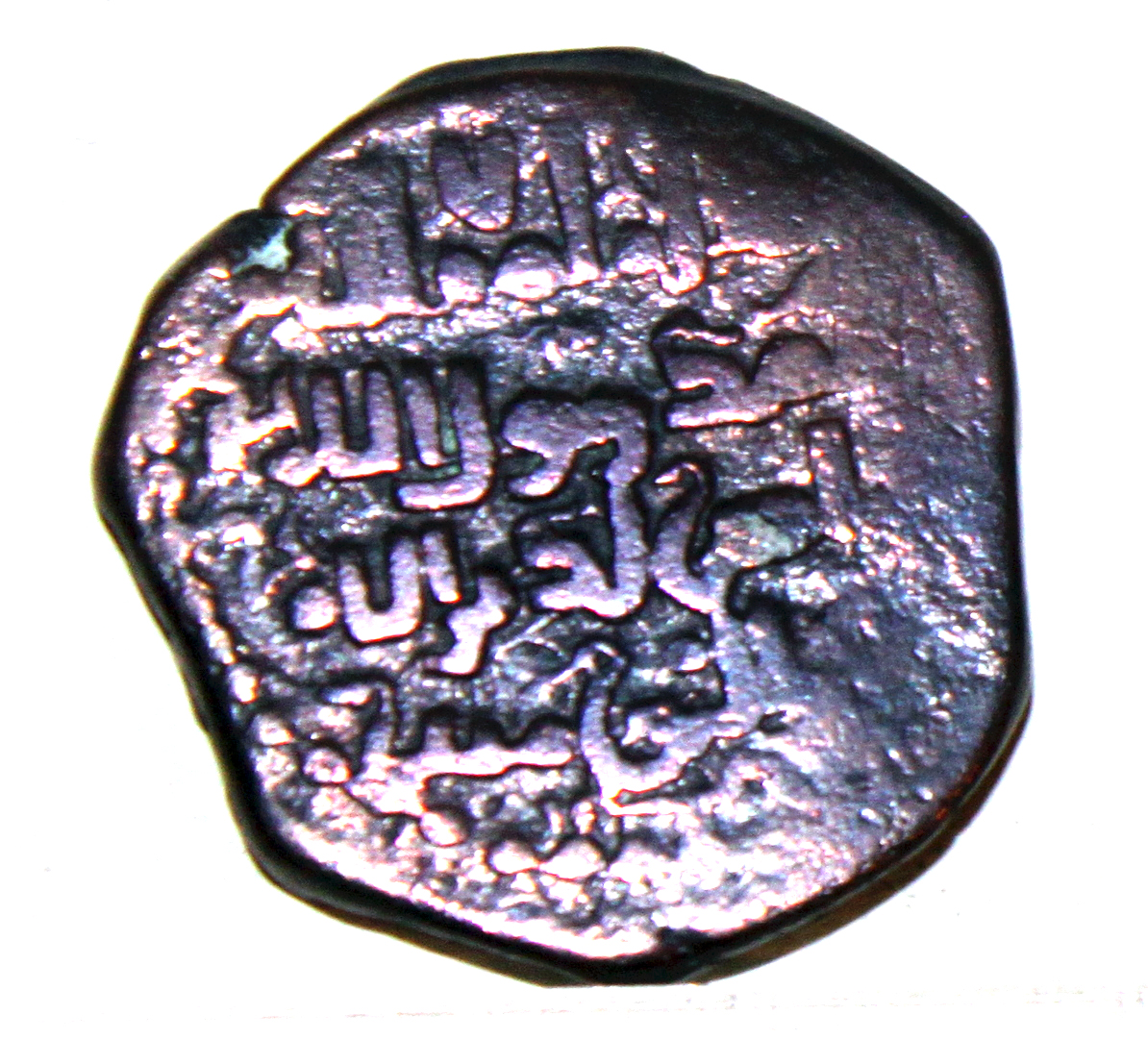
- Coin minted under Nusrat al-Din's rule

Atabeg of the Eldiguzids
- Reign: 1191 – 1210
- Predecessor: Qizil Arslan
- Successor: Muzaffar al-Din Uzbek
- Died: 1210
Names
- Nusrat al-Din Abu Bakr
- Religion: Sunni Islam

Nusrat al-Din Abu Bakr (Azerbaijani: Nüsrət əl-Din Əbu Bəkr), (Persian: نصرت الدین ابوبکر), was the ruler (atabeg) of the Eldiguzids from 1191 to 1210. He used the titles of Jahan-pahlavan ("champion of the world"), al-Malik al-Mu'azzam ("the respected king"), and Shahanshah al-A'zam ("the great king of kings").

== Sources ==
- Luther, K. A. (1987). "Atābakān-e Adharbayjān". Encyclopaedia Iranica, Vol. II, Fasc. 8. pp. 890–894.

Regnal titles
Preceded by Qizil Arslan	Eldiguzid ruler 1191–1210	Succeeded by Muzaffar al-Din Uzbek
