= Eldiguzids =

Turkic dynasty in Persia (1136–1225)

Eldiguzids Atabegs of Azerbaijan اتابکان آذربایجان
- 1136–1225
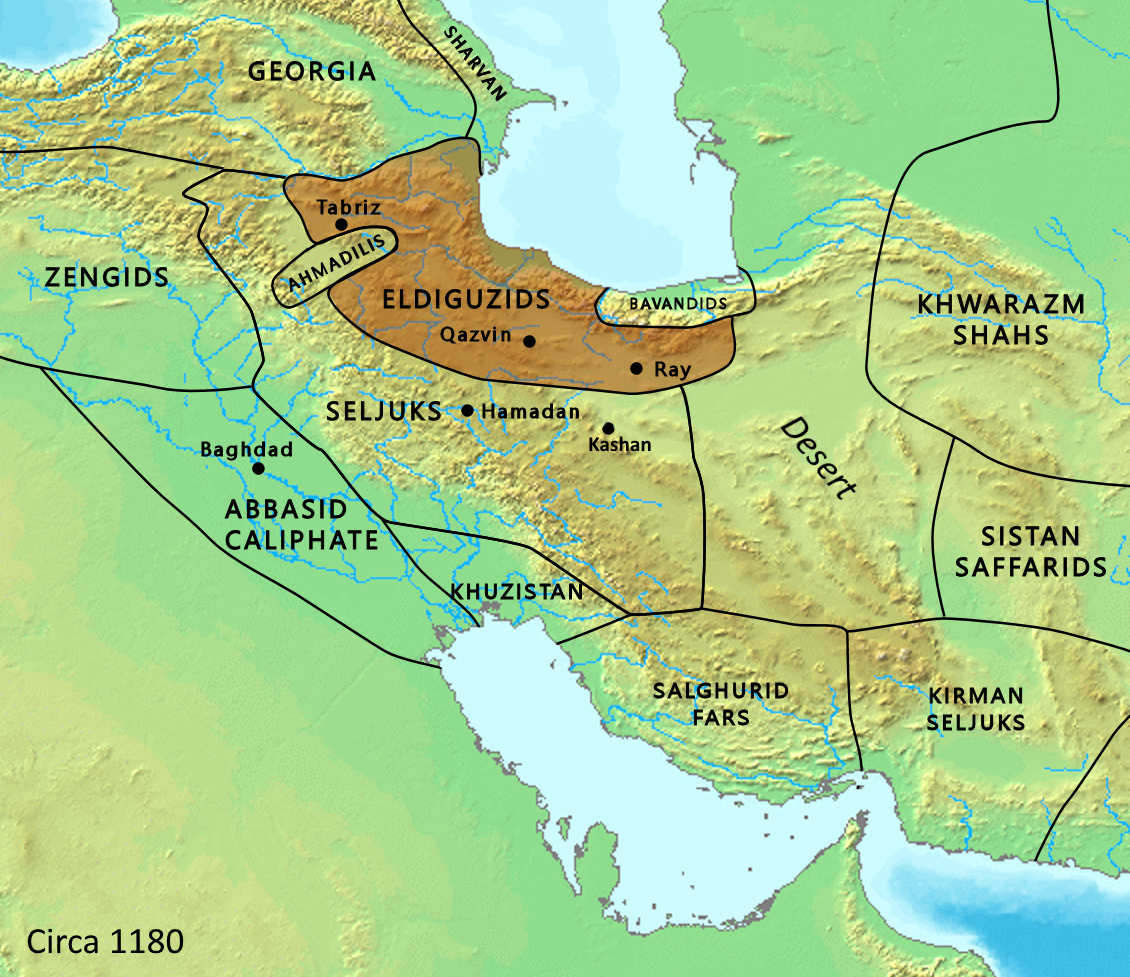
- Territory of the Eldiguzids in 1180 CE.
- Status: Atabegate
- Capital: Nakhchivan; Hamadan; Tabriz
- Common languages: Persian (official, court literature)
- Atabeg
  - 1136–1175: Eldiguz
  - 1175–1186: Muhammad
  - 1186–1191: Qizil Arslan
  - 1191–1210: Nusrat al-Din Abu Bakr
  - 1210–1225: Muzaffar al-Din Uzbek
- History
  - Established: 1136
  - Disestablished: 1225
Preceded by	Succeeded by
Seljuk Empire	Khwarazmian Empire

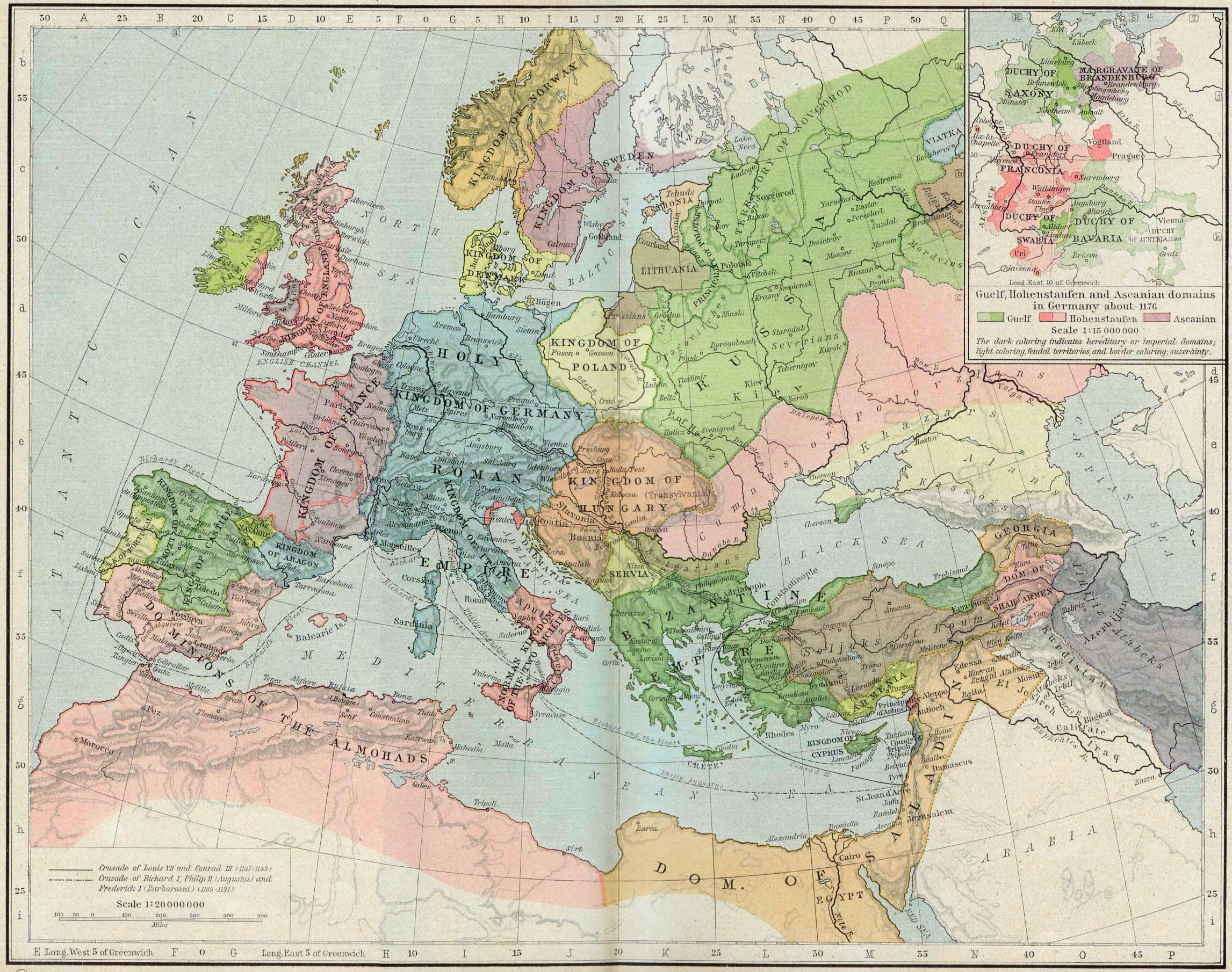
Map of medieval Europe in 1190 showing the territory of Eldiguzids in the lower right corner

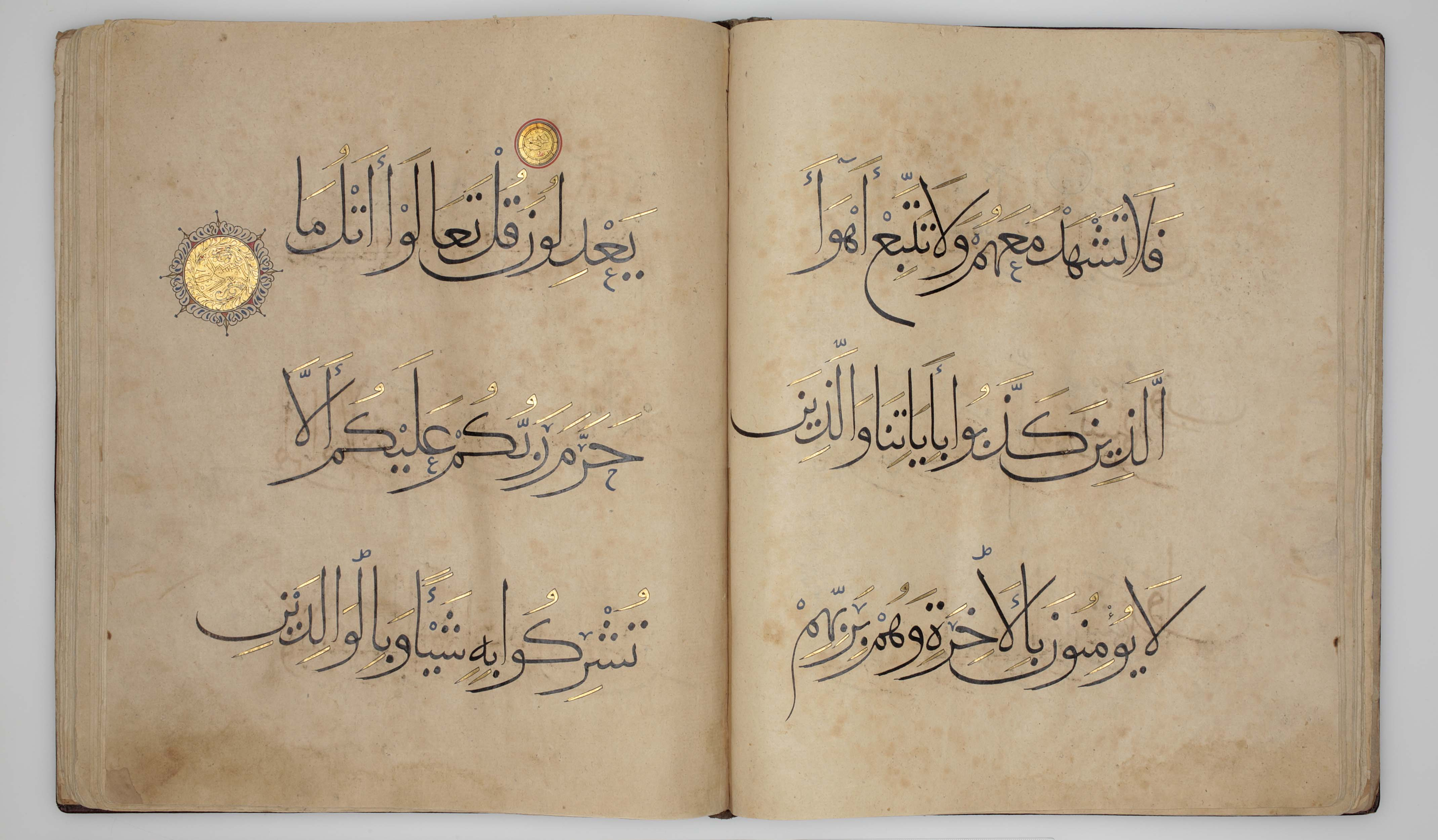
Double-page from the Qur'an dedicated to Abu’l-Qasim Harun ibn 'Ali ibn Zafar, the vizier of Özbeg (r 1210–1225), last ruler of Eldiguzids. Khalili Collection of Islamic Art

The Ildegizids, Eldiguzids or Ildenizids, also known as Atabegs of Azerbaijan (اتابکان آذربایجان Atabakan-e Āzarbayjan), were an Atabegate that broke off from the Seljuk Empire, and a Sunni Muslim Turkic dynasty (started by Eldiguz of Kipchak origin), which controlled most of northwestern Persia, eastern Transcaucasia, including Arran, most of Iranian Azerbaijan, and Jibal. At their maximum extent, the territory under their control, roughly corresponds to most of north-western Iran, most of the regions of modern Azerbaijan and smaller portions in modern Armenia (southern part), Turkey (northeastern part) and Iraq (eastern part). Down to the death in war 1194 of Toghril b. Arslan, last of the Great Seljuq rulers of Iraq and Persia, the Ildenizids ruled as theoretical subordinates of the Sultans, acknowledging this dependence on their coins almost down to the end of the Seljuqs. Thereafter, they were in effect an independent dynasty, until the westward expansion of the Mongols and the Khwarazm-Shahs weakened and then brought the line to its close.

Atabeg (literally "father-lord" in Turkic) was the title conferred upon the Turkic officers who served as guardians of minor Seljuq rulers. In the political circumstances of the time, Atabegs were not only tutors and vice-regents of their princes, but also de facto rulers. At the height of Eldiguzid power, their territory stretched from Isfahan in the south to the borders of Kingdom of Georgia and Shirvan in the north. However, closer to the end of their reign amidst continuous conflicts with the Kingdom of Georgia, the Eldiguzid territory shrank to include only Azerbaijan and eastern Transcaucasia.

The historical significance of the Atabeg of Azerbaijan lies in their firm control over north-western Persia during the later Seljuq period and also their role in Transcaucasia as champions of Islam against the Bagratids of Georgia.

== Shams ad-Din Eldiguz ==
In 1136, Sultan Ghiyath ad-Din Mas'ud (c. 1134–1152) appointed Shams ad-Din Eldiguz (c. 1135/36–1175) to be an atabeg of Arslan-Shah, the juvenile successor of the throne and transferred Azerbaijan to his possession as iqta. Eldegiz chose Barda as his residence, and attracted the local emirs to his camp.

He made himself virtually independent ruler of Azerbaijan by 1146. His marriage with the widow of Sultan Toghrul II (1132–1133; Masud's brother and predecessor) afforded him to intervene in the dynastic strife which erupted upon Mas'ud's death in 1152. He succeeded, in 1160, in deposing Suleiman-Shah and installing his stepson Arslan-Shah (c.1160–1175) as a Sultan. Conferred with the rank of Atabeg, Eldiguz now became a chief protector of the Sultan's authority.

The word azam (meaning "great" in Arabic) was added to his title and he was also known as Atabek-e Azam. All of the state's subsequent rulers used to hold this title. During his reign, Eldiguz could subdue a spacious territory between the Caucasus and Persian Gulf. The territory belonging to him stretched from the gate of Tbilisi up to Makran. He had possessed Iranian Azerbaijan, Arran, Shirvan, Jibal, Hamadan, Gilan, Mazandaran, Isfahan and Rey. The Atabegs of Mosul, Kerman and Fars as well as the feudals of Shirvan, Khuzestan, Ahlat, Arzan-ar-Rum and Maragha became his liegemen.

=== Campaigns against Georgia ===
Kingdom of Georgia, whose army was additionally strengthened by the Kipchak mercenaries, became the strongest rival of the Shams al-Din Eldiguz. In 1138, Georgian king Demetrius I, attacked the earthquake-ridden city of Ganja. While leaving the city, his troops carried off the well-known gate of Ganja as their trophy, which up to this date remains on display at the Gelati monastery. From 1161 onwards Georgians began to make plundering raids and outright conquests on Ani, Dvin, Ganja, Nakhchivan and other regions controlled by Atabegs.

Eldiguz formed a coalition with other Seljuqids in the beginning of the 1160s to fight against the Georgians, and in 1163 the allies inflicted a defeat on king George III of Georgia. The Seljuqid rulers were jubilant, and they prepared for a new campaign. However, this time they were forestalled by George III, who marched into Arran at the beginning of 1166, occupied a region extending to faraway cities as Nakhchivan and Beylagan, devastated the land and returned with prisoners and booty. There seemed to be no end to the war between George III and atabeg Eldiguz. But the belligerents were exhausted to such an extent that Eldiguz proposed an armistice. George had no alternative but to make concessions. Eldiguz restored Ani to its former rulers, the Shaddadids, who became his vassals.

In 1173, Atabeg Eldiguz began another campaign against Georgia but he was defeated. Atabeg's troops retreated and Eldiguz died in 1174 in Nakhchivan.

== Muhammad Jahan Pahlavan ==
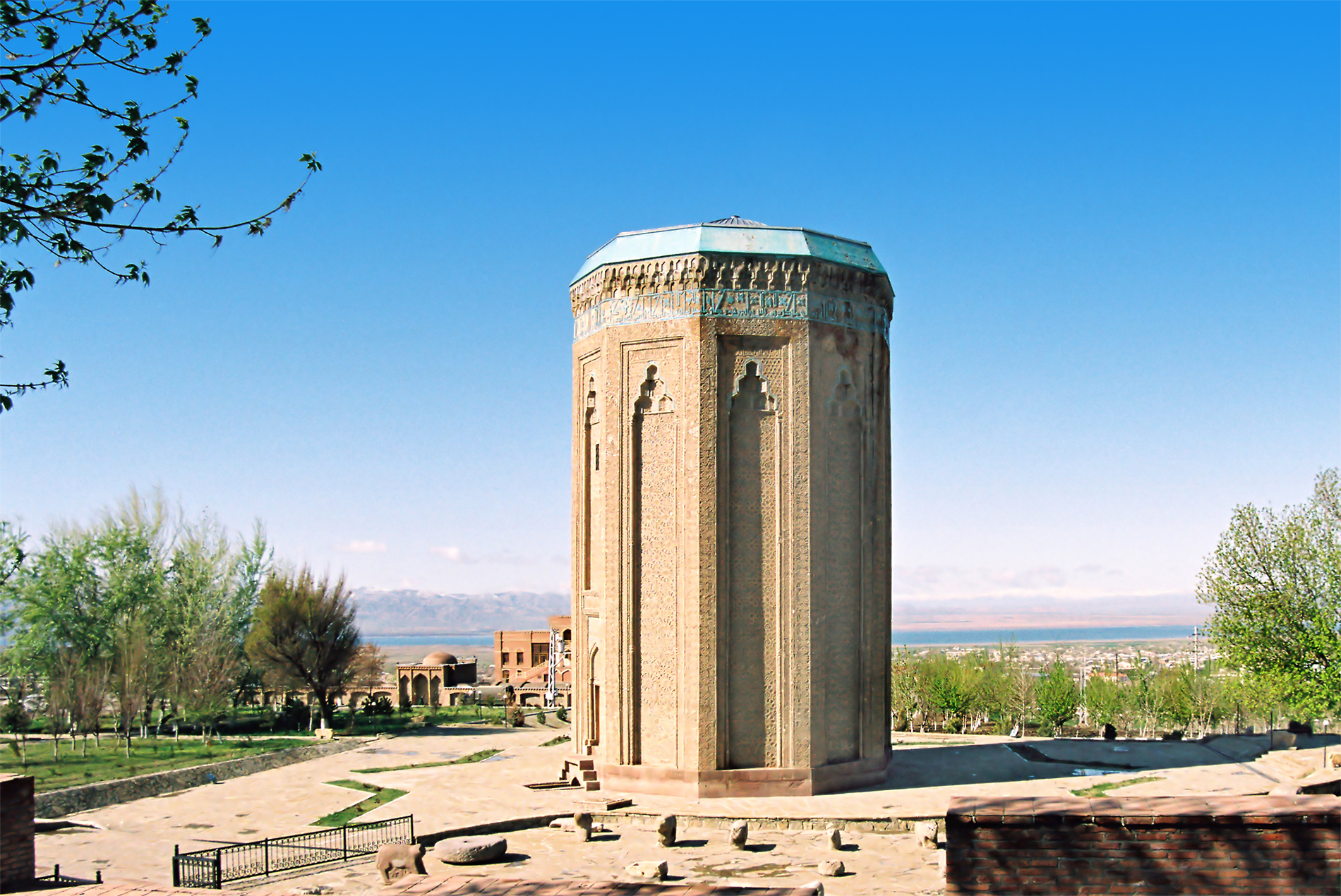
Momine Khatun Mausoleum was commissioned by Eldiguzid Atabeg Jahan Pahlawan in honor of his mother, Mu'mine Khatun

After the death of Shams al-Din Eldiguz, in 1175, the Seljuq Sultan Arslan Shah tried to escape from the yoke of the Grand Atabeg of Azerbaijan but failed, and was poisoned to death by Shams ad-Din's son, the new Grand Atabeg Muhammad Jahan Pahlavan (c.1174–1186). Pahlavan transferred his capital from Nakhchivan to Hamadan in western Iran, and made his younger brother, Qizil Arslan Uthman, the ruler of Azerbaijan. In 1174, Qizil Arslan captured Tabriz, which subsequently became his capital.

Jahan Pahlavan suppressed all rebellious emirs and appointed faithful mamluks to key positions. He apportioned each of them any region or town as Iqta. The twelve years of his rule are considered the most peaceful period of the state's existence. Under his reign the central power was strengthened and no foreign enemy invaded the territory belonging to the Atabegs. Friendly relations with Khwarazm Shahs, the rulers of Central Asia, were founded. All those facts had positive influence on the development of science, handicraft, trade and arts.

== Qizil Arslan ==
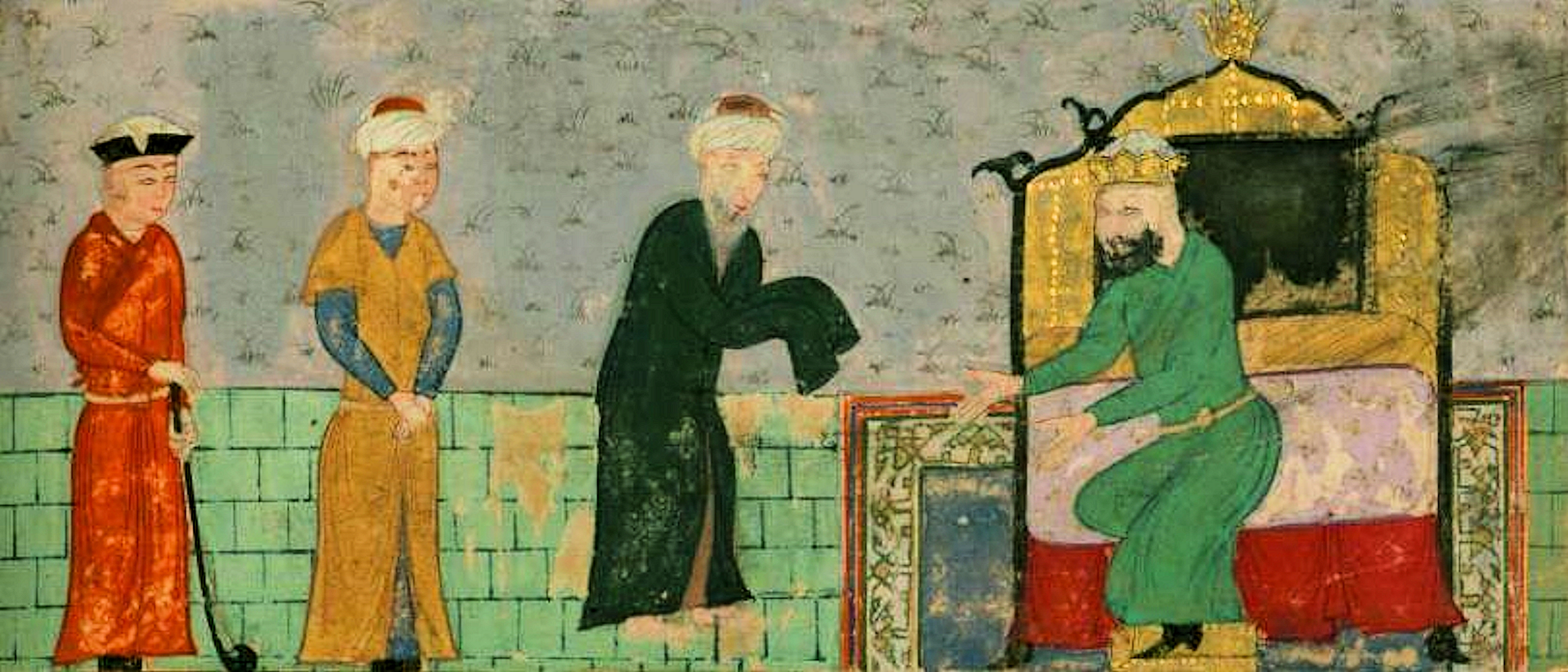
King Qizil Arslan welcomes the poet Nizami.

After Muhammad Jahan Pahlavan's death his brother Qizil Arslan (c.1186–1191) ascended the throne. He continued his successful struggle against the Seljuq rulers. At the same time the central power began to get weaker as mamluks who had strengthened their power in their allotments did not want to obey the Sultan. Even Shirvanshah Akhsitan I who used to be Atabegs' liegeman attempted to intervene the interior affairs of the Eldiguzids and opposed Qizil Arslans aspiration to the throne. In the response to this, Qizil Arslan invaded Shirvan in 1191, reached to Derbent and subordinated the whole Shirvan to his authority. In 1191 Toghrul III, the last Seljuq ruler was overthrown by Qizil Arslan. Then, by Khalif's leave, he proclaimed himself a Sultan.

The same year Qizil Arslan, who had become the sole ruler of the Great Seljuq Empire, was assassinated. The power was divided among his three sons: Abu Bakr, Qutluq Inandj and Amir Mihran. Abu Bakr governed Azerbaijan and Arran, and his brothers were the rulers of Khorasan and several neighboring regions. Soon, these three successors began to fight for the throne. Victorious in power struggle, Abu Bakr "Jahan-pahlavan" (c. 1195–1210) had his elder brother Qutluq Inandj assassinated and forced the younger brother, Amir Mihran, to take refuge at the court of the latter's brother-in-law, Shirvanshah Akhsitan I (c.1160-1196). The Shirvanshah together with Amir Mihran headed for Tbilisi, the capital of Kingdom of Georgia, and appealed for help to Queen Tamar of Georgia, an official protector of Shirvan. Received with great honors at the Georgian court, they were given desired support, and the Georgian army led by Consort David Soslan marched to Shirvan.

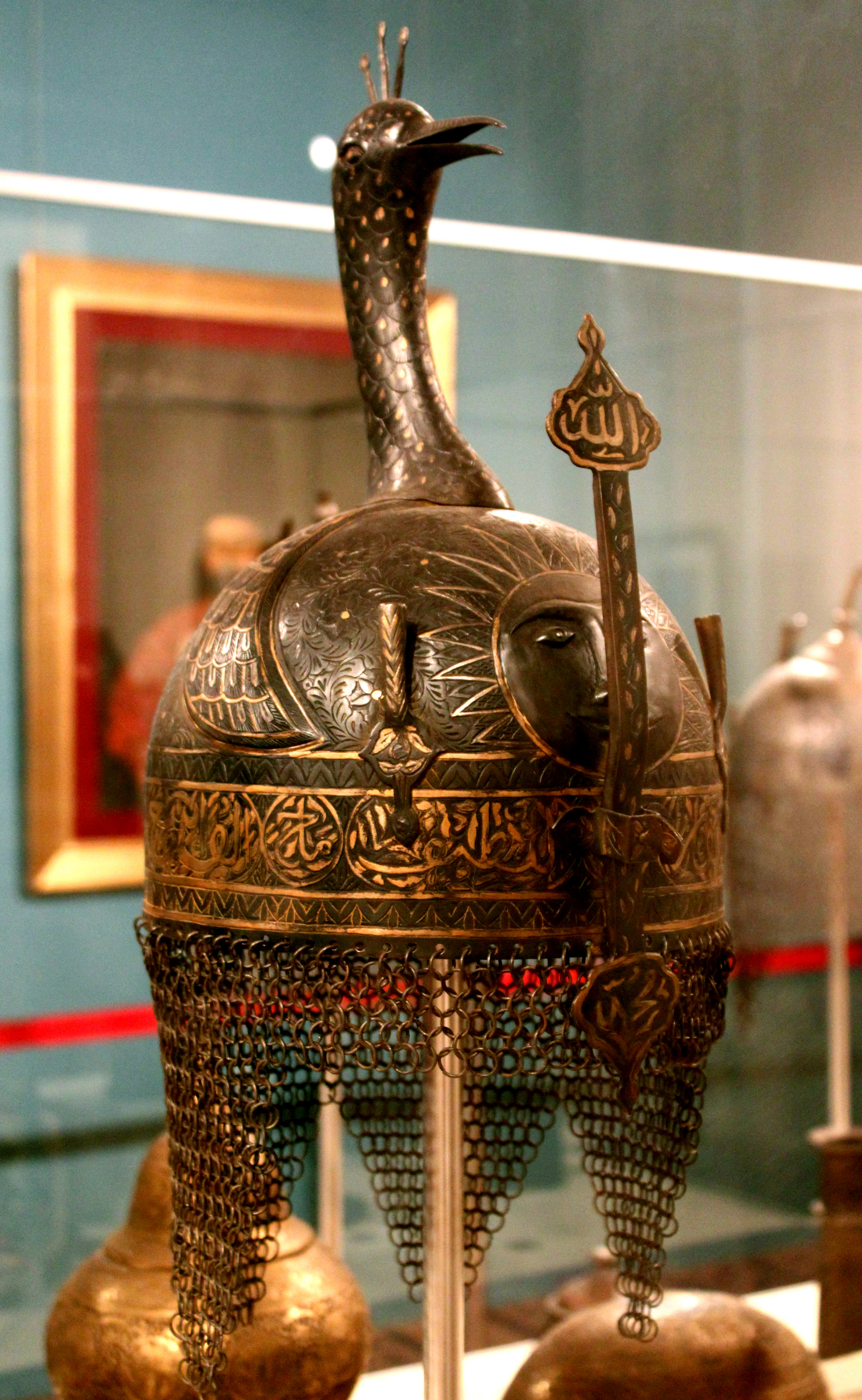
Helmet related to the period of Eldiguzids. National Art Museum of Azerbaijan, Baku

The Eldiguzid atabeg Abu Bakr attempted to stem the Georgian advance, but suffered a defeat at the hands of David Soslan at the Battle of Shamkor and lost his capital to a Georgian protégé in 1195. Although Abu Bakr was able to resume his reign a year later, the Eldiguzids were only barely able to contain further Georgian forays. The State's defense capability was stricken. Khorezmshahs' and Georgians' non-stopping forays aggravated the situation in the country and speeded up its decay.

In 1209, the Georgian army laid waste to Ardabil – according to the Georgian and Armenian annals – as a revenge for the local Muslim ruler's attack on Ani and his massacre of the city's Christian population. In a great final burst, the Georgian army led an army through Nakhchivan and Julfa, to Marand, Tabriz, and Qazvin in northwest Iran, pillaging several settlements on their way.

== Uzbek ==
After the death of Qizil Arslan, the power was divided among Jahan Pahlavan's sons, however, soon they started to fight for the throne. Abu Bakr came to the fortress of Alinja. The fortress, along with all the treasures, was at the disposal of Jahan Pahlavan's other widow, Zahida Khatun. Abu Bakr captures the fortress and the treasury. Qizil Arslan's nephews began to rule independently, and one of the Mamluks of Jahan Pahlavan, Mahmud Anas Oglu, freed Toghrul III from his prison and regains the sultanate throne in May 1192. However, soon after, in 1194, after a long war with the Khwarazm Shahs, Sultan Togrul III was defeated and the existence of the Iraqi Seljuk Sultanate came to an end.

After defeated by Abu Bakr, Amir Amiran Omar went to gain a support from Shirvanshah Akhsitan I and Georgian queen Tamar. In 1194, the united Georgian-Shirvan and Amir Amiran Omar's troops defeated Abu Bakr in the battles of Shamkir and Beylagan. Later, the Georgians trying to capture Ganja, temporarily occupied it, but soon Abu Bakr's troops drove the Georgians out of Ganja. This process was speeded up during the reign of Atabeg Uzbek (c.1210–1225), who was enthroned after Abu Bakr's death. During his reign, the country was attacked by Mongols and Georgians. In that period, Armenian prince Hasan-Jalal Dawla (founder of House of Hasan-Jalalyan cadet branch of Siunia dynasty) (c.1215–1262) began his separatist activities, a fact which shook the fundamentals of the weakened State. In 1225, Khwarazm Shah Jalal-ad-din dethroned the Ildegizid Uzbek Muzaffar al-Din and set himself up in the capital of Tabriz on the 25 of July in 1225.

== List of Eldiguzid atabegs ==
1. Eldigüz (ca. 1135 or 1136–1174 or 1175)
2. Muhammad Jahan Pahlawan, son of Eldigüz (1174 or 1175–1186)
3. Qizil Arslan, son of Eldigüz (1186–1191)
4. Qutluq Inandj, stepson of Muhammad Jahan Pahlawan (1191)
5. Nusrat al-Din Abu Bakr, son of Muhammad Jahan Pahlawan (1191–1210)
6. Muzaffar al-Din Uzbek, son of Muhammad Jahan Pahlawan (1210–1225)

== Genealogy of House of Ildiguz ==
House of Ildiguz

Atabegs of Azerbaijan

Ildiguz r. 1136–1175
Muhammad r. 1175–1186	Qizil-Arslan I r. 1186–1191
Qutluq-Inanch r. 1191–1191	Abu Bakr r. 1191–1210	Öz-Beg r. 1210–1225
Qizil-Arslan II r. 1225–1225

== See also ==
- Ibn Khosrov al-Ustad
- Turkic peoples
- Timeline of Turks (500-1300)

== Sources ==
- de Bruijn, J. T. P. (2019). "The qaside after the fall of the Ghaznavids 1100–1500 CE". In Yarshater, Ehsan (ed.). Persian Lyric Poetry in the Classical Era, 800-1500: Ghazals, Panegyrics and Quatrains: A History of Persian Literature Vol. II. I.B. Tauris. pp. 102–161. ISBN 978-1788318242.
- Katouzian, Homa (2007). Iranian History and Politics: The Dialectic of State and Society. Routledge. ISBN 978-0415297547.
- Lordkipanidze, Mariam Davydovna; Hewitt, George B. (1987). Georgia in the XI–XII Centuries. Tbilisi: Ganatleba Publishers.
- Suny, Ronald Grigor (1994). The Making of the Georgian Nation (2nd ed.). Indiana University Press. ISBN 0-253-20915-3.
